= 2025 Taguig local elections =

7th city election in Taguig

- May 12, 2025
- Turnout: 78.92% ▼3.64 pp
- Mayoral election
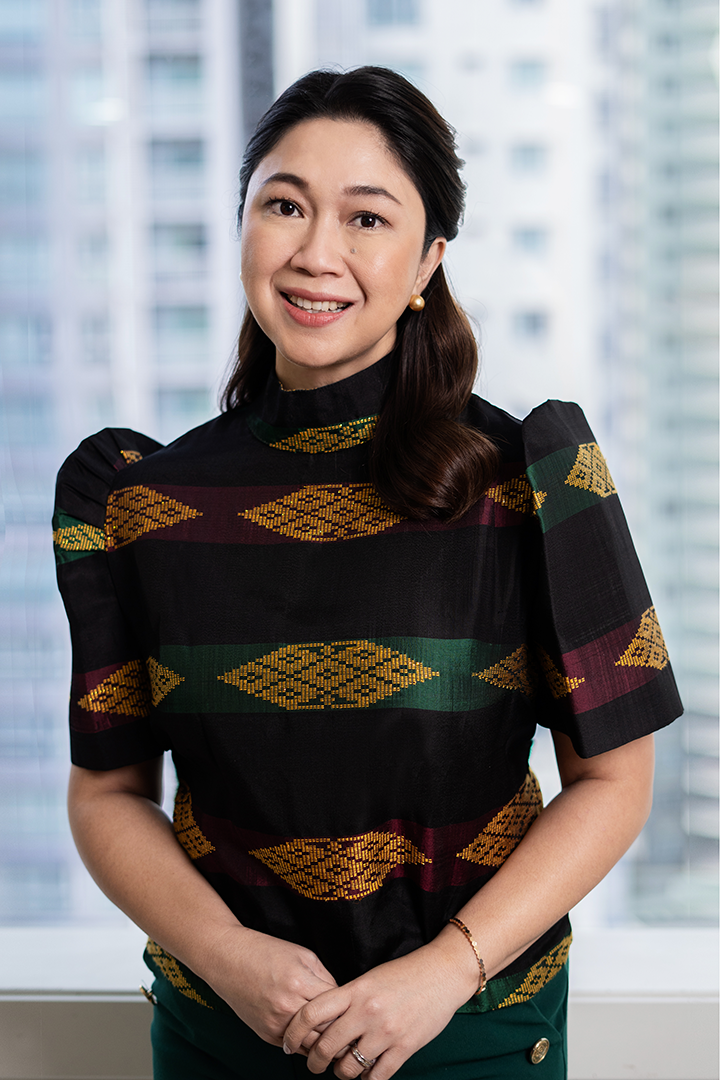
| Candidate | Lani Cayetano | Arnel Cerafica |
| Party | Nacionalista | PFP |
| Alliance | TLC | Team AMC |
| Running mate | Arvin Ian Alit | Janelle Cerafica |
| Popular vote | 410,706 | 103,334 |
| Percentage | 78.96% | 19.86% |
Mayor before election
Lani Cayetano
Nacionalista
Elected mayor
Lani Cayetano
Nacionalista
- Vice mayoral election
| Candidate | Arvin Alit | Janelle Cerafica |
| Party | Nacionalista | PFP |
| Alliance | TLC | Team AMC |
| Popular vote | 337,360 | 133,855 |
| Percentage | 69.29% | 27.49% |
Vice Mayor before election
Arvin Alit
Nacionalista
Elected Vice Mayor
Arvin Alit
Nacionalista
- City Council election

24 of 26 seats in the Taguig City Council 13 seats needed for a majority
| | First party | Second party |
|---|---|---|
| Party | Nacionalista | PFP |
| Alliance | TLC | Team AMC |
| Last election | 16 seats, 69.03% | Did Not Contest |
| Seats won | 24 | 0 |
| Seat change | ▲8 | Steady |
| Popular vote | 3,178,925 | 932,820 |
| Percentage | 68.73% | 20.22% |

Local elections were held in Taguig on May 12, 2025, as part of the 2025 Philippine general election. The electorate will elect a mayor, a vice mayor, twenty-four members of the Taguig City Council, and two district representatives to the House of Representatives of the Philippines. The officials elected in the election will assume their respective offices on June 30, 2025, for a three-year-long term.

This will be the first general election in which the Embo barangays are part of the Taguig city electorate.

== Background ==
On April 3, 2023, the Supreme Court of the Philippines denied the motion of reconsideration filed by Makati to override its earlier ruling that upheld the 2011 Pasig Regional Trial Court ruling that recognized Taguig's jurisdiction over the ten Embo barangays, resulting in Makati formally ceding control of the barangays to Taguig. The Commission on Elections (COMELEC) began the administrative transfer of the 212,613 Embo voters and electoral precincts from Makati to Taguig in August 2023, ahead of the 2023 Philippine barangay and Sangguniang Kabataan (BSKE) elections, where Embo residents voted as residents of Taguig for the first time.

In the Embo barangays, the 2023 BSKE elections resulted in widespread defeat for candidates affiliated with the ruling Cayetano family. Following the election, 140 barangay officials from the Embo area took their oath at the Makati City Hall, affirming their loyalty to Makati. Joey Salgado of Rappler opined that the aftermath of the barangay elections indicated a competitive local race in Taguig in 2025, owing to the popularity of the Binay family in the populous Embo barangays.

=== Representation of the Embo barangays ===
For the 2025 general election, the Embo residents will elect local officials for Taguig for the first time. While Embo voters will be represented in the city council, the COMELEC ruled that they will be effectively left without representation in the House of Representatives until the barangays are drawn in a legislative district of Taguig through law. Makati Mayor Abigail Binay panned the ruling as an injustice, deeming it a "denial of democracy".

The Taguig City Council planned to pass an ordinance to divide the ten Embo barangays between the two existing councilor districts for the council and increase the elected members per district. Committee hearings on the ordinance began on September 14, 2024; the drafted ordinance formally drew the barangays into the two councilor districts and sought an increase of four elected members per district, creating a total of 12 elected councilors per district and 24 overall. Subsequently, Senator Alan Peter Cayetano introduced Senate Concurrent Resolution No. 23 which the chamber adopted on September 23, followed by the House of Representatives adopting House Concurrent Resolution No. 37 on September 25. These proposals, based on Taguig City Council's Ordinance No. 144, would add barangays Comembo, Pembo, and Rizal to the 1st district and barangays Cembo, East Rembo, Pitogo, Post Proper Northside, Post Proper Southside, South Cembo, and West Rembo to the 2nd district.

Ultimately, COMELEC issued Resolution No. 11069, adopting Taguig City's Ordinance No. 144 and the joint resolution of the houses of Congress. Dante Tiñga, former House representative from Taguig–Pateros and Supreme Court Associate Justice, then questioned the Taguig City's Ordinance No. 144 to the Supreme Court, arguing that the city council had no authority to increase the number of seats, but rather that power belonged to Congress by passing a statute, and not a resolution.

== Candidates ==
Candidates in italics indicate incumbents seeking reelection.

=== Administration coalition ===
TLC (Team Lani Cayetano)
| Position | # | Name | Party |
|---|---|---|---|
| Mayor | 1. | Lani Cayetano | Nacionalista |
| Vice mayor | 1. | Arvin Ian Alit | Nacionalista |
| House representative (1st district) | 3. | Ricardo "Ading" Cruz Jr. | Nacionalista |
| House representative (2nd district) | 1. | Jorge Daniel Bocobo | Nacionalista |
| Councilor (1st district) | 2. | Kim Abbang | Nacionalista |
| Councilor (1st district) | 4. | Raul Aquino | Nacionalista |
| Councilor (1st district) | 9. | Allan Paul Cruz | Nacionalista |
| Councilor (1st district) | 11. | Sammy Cruz | Nacionalista |
| Councilor (1st district) | 16. | Darwin Icay | Nacionalista |
| Councilor (1st district) | 18. | Jimmy Labampa | Nacionalista |
| Councilor (1st district) | 21. | Totong Mañosca | Nacionalista |
| Councilor (1st district) | 22. | Rodil Marcelino | Nacionalista |
| Councilor (1st district) | 23. | Carlito Ogalinola | Nacionalista |
| Councilor (1st district) | 25. | Fanella Joy Panga-Cruz | Nacionalista |
| Councilor (1st district) | 26. | Gamaliel San Pedro | Nacionalista |
| Councilor (1st district) | 28. | Ferdinand Santos | Nacionalista |
| Councilor (2nd district) | 6. | Marisse Balina-Eron | Nacionalista |
| Councilor (2nd district) | 8. | Edgar Baptista | Nacionalista |
| Councilor (2nd district) | 9. | Gigi Bermas-Villasis | Nacionalista |
| Councilor (2nd district) | 14. | Danilo Castro | Nacionalista |
| Councilor (2nd district) | 18. | Iony De Lara-Bes | Nacionalista |
| Councilor (2nd district) | 20. | Ivie Dizon | Nacionalista |
| Councilor (2nd district) | 24. | Gen Pautin | Nacionalista |
| Councilor (2nd district) | 25. | Alex Penolio | Nacionalista |
| Councilor (2nd district) | 27. | Ed Prado | Nacionalista |
| Councilor (2nd district) | 31. | Jomil Bryan Serna | Nacionalista |
| Councilor (2nd district) | 32. | Nicky Supan | Nacionalista |
| Councilor (2nd district) | 36. | Bing Villamor | Nacionalista |

=== Primary opposition coalition ===
Team AMC
| Position | # | Name | Party |
|---|---|---|---|
| Mayor | 2. | Arnel Cerafica | PFP |
| Vice mayor | 2. | Janelle Cerafica | PFP |
| House representative (1st district) | 2. | Allan Cerafica | PFP |
| House representative (2nd district) | 3. | Pammy Zamora | Lakas |
| Councilor (1st district) | 5. | Mark Emerson Bacsain | PFP |
| Councilor (1st district) | 6. | John John Bautista | PFP |
| Councilor (1st district) | 8. | RJ Bernal | PFP |
| Councilor (1st district) | 10. | Norjannah Cruz | PFP |
| Councilor (1st district) | 14. | Warren Delos Santos | PFP |
| Councilor (1st district) | 15. | Rolando Gonzales | PFP |
| Councilor (1st district) | 17. | Tristan Inan | PFP |
| Councilor (1st district) | 19. | Paul Lontoc | Independent |
| Councilor (1st district) | 20. | Elvira Madrid | PFP |
| Councilor (1st district) | 27. | Joshua Narc Sanga | PFP |
| Councilor (1st district) | 29. | Maria Ana Santos | PFP |
| Councilor (1st district) | 30. | Gerard Sumagpao | PFP |
| Councilor (2nd district) | 1. | Benedicto Abatay | PFP |
| Councilor (2nd district) | 2. | Jude Acepcion | PFP |
| Councilor (2nd district) | 3. | Joel Advincula | PFP |
| Councilor (2nd district) | 7. | Marilou Bandejas | PFP |
| Councilor (2nd district) | 10. | Angielyn Bombase | PFP |
| Councilor (2nd district) | 12. | Lylani Calvadores | PFP |
| Councilor (2nd district) | 21. | Armando Ercillo | PFP |
| Councilor (2nd district) | 22. | Arthur Flores | PFP |
| Councilor (2nd district) | 26. | Basilio Pooten | PFP |
| Councilor (2nd district) | 28. | Ignacio Rivera Jr. | PFP |
| Councilor (2nd district) | 29. | Glenn Sacay | PFP |
| Councilor (2nd district) | 35. | Gary Lester Valdez | PFP |

=== Other candidates ===
BIDA TAYO
| Position | # | Name | Party |
|---|---|---|---|
| House representative (1st district) | 1. | Lino Cayetano | NPC |
| Councilor (1st district) | 1. | Romeo Edgar Abaigar | Independent |
| Councilor (1st district) | 7. | Mark Bryan Beran | Independent |
| Councilor (1st district) | 24. | Rico Palma | Independent |
| Councilor (1st district) | 31. | Henry Vera | Independent |

| Position | # | Name | Party |
|---|---|---|---|
| Mayor | 3. | Brigido Licudine | Independent |
| Vice mayor | 3. | Nelly Tanglao | Independent |
| House representative (1st district) | 4. | Pedro dela Cruz | Independent |
| House representative (1st district) | 5. | Ricardo Opoc | Independent |
| House representative (2nd district) | 2. | Noe Manila | Independent |
| Councilor (1st district) | 3. | Johnny Alvarida | Independent |
| Councilor (1st district) | 12. | Reinante Dela Paz | Independent |
| Councilor (1st district) | 13. | Girlie Delos Santos | Makabayan |
| Councilor (2nd district) | 4. | Juanito Aggalut | Independent |
| Councilor (2nd district) | 5. | Abraham Anuncacion | Independent |
| Councilor (2nd district) | 11. | Rosaldo Paolo Cabrera VIII | Independent |
| Councilor (2nd district) | 13. | Isidro Capurcos | Independent |
| Councilor (2nd district) | 15. | Arthur Clavo | Independent |
| Councilor (2nd district) | 16. | Edgardo Daria | Independent |
| Councilor (2nd district) | 17. | Cosmiano De Asis | Independent |
| Councilor (2nd district) | 19. | Cupid Demafiles | Independent |
| Councilor (2nd district) | 23. | Persilita Magallano | Independent |
| Councilor (2nd district) | 30. | Rodolfo San Pedro Jr. | Independent |
| Councilor (2nd district) | 33. | Jerry Tan | PLM |
| Councilor (2nd district) | 34. | Caleb Tibio | Independent |
| Councilor (2nd district) | 37. | Salvador Zamora III | Independent |

== Mayoral election ==
The incumbent mayor is Lani Cayetano, who has served since 2022 and previously held the post from 2010 to 2019, after being elected with 75.77% of the vote. She is eligible for reelection to a second consecutive term.

Abigail Binay, the term-limited mayor of Makati, has expressed interest in running for mayor of Taguig. To seek the office, Binay would need to resign as mayor of Makati to establish at least one year of residency in Taguig to be eligible for the post. On January 9, 2024, Binay remarked that she is "waiting for a sign" for her to push through with her campaign in Taguig; she indicated that she would finalize her decision by March 2024. Manuel L. Quezon III of the Philippine Daily Inquirer described Binay's potential campaign for mayor of Taguig as a "dynastic invasion" motivated by Makati's loss of the Embo barangays. Since her announcement, Binay has not resigned her post, making a mayoral bid less likely as she is instead being considered as a senatorial bet by the administration coalition. It was later confirmed that she will instead run for senator in 2025 when she was named to the Alyansa para sa Bagong Pilipinas coalition.

Meanwhile, political strategist Lito Banayo revealed that former mayor Lino Cayetano, brother-in-law of the incumbent, may challenge for the mayor's seat after reportedly getting the backing of two important factions in local politics: the Zamora family (including second district representative Pammy Zamora, daughter of former San Juan representative Ronaldo Zamora) and the Tiñga family (including former mayor Sigfrido Tiñga), potentially forming an alliance between a Cayetano and several of their political enemies. However, the former mayor announced that he is not running for mayor in his Facebook post, but is still undecided if he would run for another local position. He instead chose to run for first district representative, against his sister-in-law's preferred candidate.

Instead, former first district representative Arnel Cerafica, now backed by the Partido Federal ng Pilipinas, challenged to represent the local opposition, including from the Embo barangays, in the mayoral election. This is his third bid to be elected mayor, having lost to the incumbent in 2022 and to Lino Cayetano in 2019.

=== Candidates ===
- Lani Cayetano (Nacionalista), incumbent mayor of Taguig
- Arnel Cerafica (PFP), candidate for mayor in 2019 and 2022, former representative from Taguig–Pateros's 1st district
- Brigido Licudine (Independent)

Declined

- Abigail Binay, incumbent mayor of Makati (running for Senator)
- Lino Cayetano, former mayor of Taguig and former representative for Taguig–Pateros's 2nd district (running for representative)
- Sigfrido Tiñga, founder and President of Global Electric Transport, former mayor of Taguig and former representative for Taguig–Pateros's 2nd district (did not run)

=== Polling ===
Hypothetical polling

Abby Binay vs. Lani Cayetano

| Fieldwork Date(s) | Pollster | Sample Size | MoE | Cayetano Nacionalista | Binay NPC | Und./ None |
|---|---|---|---|---|---|---|
| Feb 15–22 | RPMDinc | 1,200 | ±3% | 57 | 38 | 5 |

Lani Cayetano vs. Arnel Cerafica

| Fieldwork Date(s) | Pollster | Sample Size | MoE | Cayetano Nacionalista | Cerafica PFP | Und./ None |
|---|---|---|---|---|---|---|
| Nov 15–20 | RPMDinc | 1,200 | ±3% | 63 | 17 | 20 |

=== Results ===
2025 Taguig mayoral elections
| Candidate | Party | Votes | % |
|---|---|---|---|
| Lani Cayetano (incumbent) | Nacionalista Party | 410,706 | 78.92 |
| Arnel Cerafica | Partido Federal ng Pilipinas | 103,334 | 19.86 |
| Brigido Licudine | Independent | 6,394 | 1.23 |
| Total | | 520,434 | 100.00 |

==== Per Barangay ====
| Barangay | Cayetano | | Cerafica | | Licudine | | Total votes |
| Barangay | Votes | % | Votes | % | Votes | % | Total votes |
|---|---|---|---|---|---|---|---|
| Bagumbayan | 19,899 | 86.42 | 3,059 | 13.28 | 68 | 0.30 | 23,026 |
| Bambang | 4,972 | 82.02 | 991 | 16.35 | 99 | 1.63 | 6,062 |
| Calzada-Tipas | 10,259 | 80.67 | 2,419 | 19.02 | 40 | 0.31 | 12,718 |
| Cembo | 7,497 | 57.76 | 4,898 | 37.73 | 585 | 4.51 | 12,980 |
| Central Bicutan | 13,208 | 86.42 | 1,696 | 11.33 | 59 | 0.39 | 14,963 |
| Central Signal Village | 17,595 | 86.38 | 2,689 | 13.20 | 85 | 0.42 | 20,369 |
| Comembo | 4,952 | 55.02 | 3,814 | 42.38 | 234 | 2.60 | 9,000 |
| East Rembo | 7,171 | 52.83 | 5,973 | 44.00 | 431 | 3.17 | 13,575 |
| Fort Bonifacio | 7,481 | 83.48 | 1,080 | 12.05 | 400 | 4.46 | 8,961 |
| Hagonoy | 10,238 | 83.97 | 1,904 | 15.62 | 50 | 0.41 | 12,192 |
| Ibayo-Tipas | 7,935 | 80.02 | 1,928 | 19.44 | 53 | 0.53 | 9,916 |
| Katuparan | 8,864 | 86.90 | 1,296 | 12.71 | 40 | 0.39 | 10,200 |
| Ligid-Tipas | 4,688 | 80.62 | 1,101 | 18.93 | 26 | 0.45 | 5,815 |
| Lower Bicutan | 22,375 | 83.52 | 4,324 | 16.14 | 90 | 0.34 | 26,789 |
| Maharlika | 7,784 | 91.37 | 708 | 8.31 | 27 | 0.32 | 8,519 |
| Napindan | 9,823 | 81.47 | 2,174 | 18.03 | 60 | 0.50 | 12,057 |
| New Lower Bicutan | 20,131 | 84.29 | 3,667 | 15.35 | 85 | 0.36 | 23,883 |
| North Daang Hari | 6,121 | 87.48 | 852 | 12.18 | 24 | 0.34 | 6,997 |
| North Signal Village | 13,692 | 88.42 | 1,707 | 11.02 | 86 | 0.56 | 15,485 |
| Palingon-Tipas | 5,721 | 71.57 | 2,243 | 28.06 | 30 | 0.38 | 7,994 |
| Pembo | 12,407 | 59.68 | 7,810 | 37.57 | 573 | 2.76 | 20,790 |
| Pinagsama | 21,595 | 85.01 | 3,537 | 13.92 | 272 | 1.07 | 25,404 |
| Pitogo | 4,066 | 65.06 | 1,879 | 30.06 | 305 | 4.88 | 6,250 |
| Post Proper Northside | 2,198 | 76.35 | 627 | 21.78 | 54 | 1.88 | 2,879 |
| Post Proper Southside | 8,590 | 73.45 | 2,886 | 24.68 | 219 | 1.87 | 11,695 |
| Rizal | 14,341 | 63.77 | 7,593 | 33.76 | 556 | 2.47 | 22,490 |
| San Miguel | 4,505 | 84.98 | 743 | 14.02 | 53 | 1.00 | 5,301 |
| Santa Ana | 8,668 | 77.17 | 2,536 | 22.58 | 29 | 0.26 | 11,233 |
| South Cembo | 3,940 | 60.49 | 2,298 | 35.28 | 276 | 4.24 | 6,514 |
| South Daang Hari | 9,635 | 85.20 | 1,645 | 14.55 | 29 | 0.26 | 11,309 |
| South Signal Village | 15,931 | 85.53 | 2,596 | 13.94 | 99 | 0.53 | 18,626 |
| Tanyag | 11,375 | 90.27 | 1,170 | 9.28 | 56 | 0.44 | 12,601 |
| Tuktukan | 5,597 | 83.46 | 1,076 | 16.05 | 33 | 0.49 | 6,706 |
| Upper Bicutan | 17,470 | 83.92 | 3,264 | 15.68 | 83 | 0.40 | 20,734 |
| Ususan | 14,524 | 85.05 | 2,284 | 13.37 | 270 | 1.58 | 17,078 |
| Wawa | 6,028 | 88.39 | 774 | 11.35 | 18 | 0.26 | 6,820 |
| West Rembo | 7,717 | 51.57 | 6,718 | 44.90 | 528 | 3.53 | 14,963 |
| Western Bicutan | 31,713 | 84.67 | 5,375 | 14.35 | 369 | 0.99 | 37,457 |
| Total | 410,706 | 78.92 | 103,334 | 19.86 | 6,394 | 1.23 | 520,434 |

== Vice mayoral election ==
The incumbent vice mayor is Arvin Alit, who has served since 2022 after being elected with 68.81% of the vote. He is eligible to run for his second consecutive term.

=== Candidates ===
- Arvin Ian Alit (Nacionalista), incumbent vice mayor of Taguig and former city councilor from the 2nd District
- Janelle Cerafica (PFP), candidate for vice mayor in 2022, wife of Arnel Cerafica
- Nelly Tanglao (Independent)

=== Results ===
2025 Taguig vice mayoral election
| Candidate | Party | Votes | % |
|---|---|---|---|
| Arvin Ian Alit (incumbent) | Nacionalista | 337,360 | 69.29 |
| Janelle Cerafica | Partido Federal ng Pilipinas | 133,855 | 27.49 |
| Nelly Tanglao | Independent | 15,657 | 3.22 |
| Total | | 486,872 | 100.00 |

==== Per Barangay ====
| Barangay | Alit | | Cerafica | | Tanglao | |
| Barangay | Votes | % | Votes | % | Votes | % |
|---|---|---|---|---|---|---|
| Bagumbayan | 16,521 | 77.00 | 4,600 | 21.44 | 334 | 1.56 |
| Bambang | 4,117 | 72.96 | 1,334 | 23.82 | 182 | 3.23 |
| Calzada-Tipas | 8,361 | 70.41 | 3,342 | 28.15 | 171 | 1.44 |
| Cembo | 5,283 | 44.31 | 5,488 | 46.03 | 1,151 | 9.65 |
| Central Bicutan | 11,001 | 77.53 | 2,879 | 20.29 | 310 | 2.18 |
| Central Signal Village | 15,326 | 78.78 | 3,819 | 19.63 | 308 | 1.58 |
| Comembo | 3,556 | 42.70 | 4,277 | 51.36 | 495 | 5.94 |
| East Rembo | 5,306 | 42.00 | 6,499 | 51.44 | 829 | 6.56 |
| Fort Bonifacio | 5,992 | 72.82 | 1,568 | 19.05 | 669 | 8.13 |
| Hagonoy | 8,757 | 75.88 | 2,597 | 22.50 | 187 | 1.62 |
| Ibayo-Tipas | 6,480 | 70.10 | 2,588 | 28.00 | 176 | 1.90 |
| Katuparan | 7,728 | 80.09 | 1,770 | 18.34 | 151 | 1.56 |
| Ligid-Tipas | 3,885 | 72.79 | 1,372 | 25.71 | 80 | 1.50 |
| Lower Bicutan | 18,394 | 73.01 | 6,396 | 25.39 | 404 | 1.60 |
| Maharlika | 6,617 | 83.80 | 1,155 | 14.63 | 124 | 1.57 |
| Napindan | 7,678 | 70.07 | 3,084 | 28.15 | 195 | 1.78 |
| New Lower Bicutan | 16,865 | 75.16 | 5,244 | 23.37 | 330 | 1.47 |
| North Daang Hari | 5,314 | 79.98 | 1,247 | 18.77 | 83 | 1.25 |
| North Signal Village | 12,048 | 81.45 | 2,471 | 16.70 | 273 | 1.85 |
| Palingon-Tipas | 4,640 | 62.10 | 2,720 | 36.40 | 112 | 1.50 |
| Pembo | 8,742 | 45.94 | 8,993 | 47.26 | 1,294 | 6.80 |
| Pinagsama | 18,127 | 75.52 | 5,168 | 21.53 | 709 | 2.95 |
| Pitogo | 3,010 | 52.67 | 2,170 | 37.97 | 535 | 9.36 |
| Post Proper Northside | 1,726 | 64.72 | 822 | 30.82 | 119 | 4.46 |
| Post Proper Southside | 6,327 | 59.27 | 3,768 | 35.30 | 580 | 5.43 |
| Rizal | 10,387 | 50.74 | 8,855 | 43.26 | 1,229 | 6.00 |
| San Miguel | 3,792 | 76.25 | 1,054 | 21.19 | 127 | 2.55 |
| Santa Ana | 7,087 | 67.07 | 3,343 | 31.64 | 136 | 1.29 |
| South Cembo | 2,945 | 49.03 | 2,550 | 42.45 | 512 | 8.52 |
| South Daang Hari | 8,450 | 79.01 | 2,092 | 19.56 | 153 | 1.43 |
| South Signal Village | 13,873 | 78.10 | 3,574 | 20.12 | 317 | 1.78 |
| Tanyag | 9,920 | 83.16 | 1,816 | 15.22 | 193 | 1.62 |
| Tuktukan | 4,688 | 74.26 | 1,528 | 24.20 | 97 | 1.54 |
| Upper Bicutan | 15,293 | 76.50 | 4,393 | 21.97 | 305 | 1.53 |
| Ususan | 11,757 | 74.78 | 3,367 | 21.42 | 598 | 3.80 |
| Wawa | 5,186 | 80.77 | 1,148 | 17.88 | 87 | 1.35 |
| West Rembo | 5,551 | 40.00 | 7,259 | 52.31 | 1,068 | 7.00 |
| Western Bicutan | 26,630 | 75.74 | 7,495 | 21.32 | 1,034 | 2.94 |
| Total | 337,360 | 69.29 | 133,855 | 27.49 | 15,657 | 3.22 |

== House of Representatives elections ==
Coinciding with the local elections, two representatives from the districts the city shares with Pateros will be elected to represent the city and the municipality in the House of Representatives in the 20th Congress.

=== First district ===
The first district encompasses the entirety of Pateros and Taguig's eastern barangays of Bagumbayan, Bambang, Calzada, Hagonoy, Ibayo-Tipas, Ligid-Tipas, Lower Bicutan, New Lower Bicutan, Napindan, Palingon, San Miguel, Santa Ana, Tuktukan, Ususan and Wawa. City Ordinance No. 144 passed by the city council, as adopted by COMELEC Resolution No. 11069, added the Embo barangays Comembo, Pembo, and Rizal to the district.

On October 30, 2024, the Comelec rejected the transfer of residency to the district by Lino Cayetano after the filing of certificates of candidacy have ended, but the poll body noted that the former mayor can still avail of legal remedies, and speculation about his disqualification is "premature".

The incumbent representative is Ricardo Cruz Jr., an ally of the incumbent city administration, who was elected in 2022 with 58.25% of the vote.

==== Candidates ====
- Lino Cayetano (NPC), former mayor of Taguig (2019–2022), representative from Taguig–Pateros's 2nd district (2013–2016)
- Allan Cerafica (PFP), candidate in 2019 and 2022 for representative of 1st District of Taguig-Pateros, former barangay captain of Palingon-Tipas, brother of Arnel Cerafica
- Ricardo Cruz Jr. (Nacionalista), incumbent representative from Taguig–Pateros's 1st district (2022–present)
- Pedro dela Cruz (Independent), retired soldier
- Ricardo Opoc (Independent)

==== Results ====
2025 First District Congressional Election
| Candidate | Party | Votes | % |
|---|---|---|---|
| Ricardo "Ading" Cruz Jr. (incumbent) | Nacionalista Party | 106,124 | 46.52 |
| Lino Cayetano | Nationalist People's Coalition | 72,007 | 31.57 |
| Allan Cerafica | Partido Federal ng Pilipinas | 46,184 | 20.25 |
| Pedro "Peter" dela Cruz | Independent | 2,287 | 1.00 |
| Ricardo Opoc | Independent | 1,517 | 0.67 |
| Total | | 228,119 | 100.00 |

==== Per Barangay ====
| Barangay | Cruz Jr. | | Cayetano | | Cerafica | | Dela Cruz | | Opoc | |
| Barangay | Votes | % | Votes | % | Votes | % | Votes | % | Votes | % |
|---|---|---|---|---|---|---|---|---|---|---|
| Bagumbayan | 10,745 | 49.06 | 8,036 | 36.69 | 2,970 | 13.56 | 93 | 0.42 | 58 | 0.26 |
| Bambang | 3,078 | 53.08 | 1,689 | 29.13 | 941 | 16.23 | 58 | 1.00 | 33 | 0.57 |
| Calzada-Tipas | 5,865 | 48.67 | 3,729 | 30.94 | 2,387 | 19.81 | 49 | 0.41 | 21 | 0.17 |
| Comembo | 2,705 | 31.48 | 2,442 | 28.42 | 3,112 | 36.21 | 207 | 2.41 | 128 | 1.89 |
| Hagonoy | 6,019 | 51.86 | 3,672 | 31.64 | 1,822 | 15.70 | 65 | 0.56 | 29 | 0.25 |
| Ibayo-Tipas | 4,838 | 51.10 | 2,658 | 28.07 | 1,890 | 19.96 | 55 | 0.58 | 27 | 0.29 |
| Ligid-Tipas | 2,968 | 53.23 | 1,492 | 26.76 | 1,082 | 19.40 | 23 | 0.41 | 11 | 0.20 |
| Lower Bicutan | 12,521 | 49.20 | 8,148 | 32.02 | 4,563 | 17.93 | 139 | 0.55 | 76 | 0.30 |
| Napindan | 5,410 | 47.90 | 3,692 | 32.69 | 2,078 | 18.40 | 73 | 0.65 | 42 | 0.37 |
| New Lower Bicutan | 11,858 | 52.66 | 6,682 | 29.67 | 3,798 | 16.87 | 103 | 0.46 | 77 | 0.34 |
| Palingon-Tipas | 3,381 | 44.10 | 1,943 | 25.35 | 2,306 | 30.08 | 19 | 0.25 | 17 | 0.22 |
| Pembo | 5,958 | 29.97 | 6,750 | 33.95 | 6,157 | 30.97 | 497 | 2.50 | 521 | 2.62 |
| Rizal | 7,559 | 35.44 | 7,116 | 33.36 | 5,900 | 27.66 | 470 | 2.20 | 287 | 1.35 |
| San Miguel | 2,607 | 51.46 | 1,672 | 33.00 | 727 | 14.35 | 33 | 0.65 | 27 | 0.53 |
| Santa Ana | 5,343 | 49.83 | 2,750 | 25.65 | 2,559 | 23.87 | 50 | 0.47 | 20 | 0.19 |
| Tuktukan | 3,537 | 55.07 | 1,791 | 27.88 | 1,056 | 16.44 | 23 | 0.36 | 16 | 0.25 |
| Ususan | 7,882 | 48.52 | 5,833 | 35.90 | 2,108 | 12.98 | 308 | 1.90 | 115 | 0.71 |
| Wawa | 3,850 | 59.01 | 1,912 | 29.31 | 728 | 11.16 | 22 | 0.34 | 12 | 0.18 |
| Total | 106,124 | 46.52 | 72,057 | 31.57 | 46,184 | 20.25 | 2,287 | 1.00 | 1,517 | 0.67 |

=== Second district ===
The second district encompasses Taguig's western barangays of Central Bicutan, Central Signal Village, Fort Bonifacio, Katuparan, Maharlika Village, North Daang Hari, North Signal Village, Pinagsama, South Daang Hari, South Signal Village, Tanyag, Upper Bicutan and Western Bicutan. City Ordinance No. 144 passed by the city council, as adopted by COMELEC Resolution No. 11069, added the Embo barangays Cembo, East Rembo, Pitogo, Post Proper Northside, Post Proper Southside, South Cembo, and West Rembo to the district.

The incumbent representative is Pammy Zamora, who was elected in 2022 with 68.75% of the vote. She was previously allied with the incumbent city administration until 2024, when she switched from the Nacionalista Party to Lakas–CMD.

==== Candidates ====
- Jorge Daniel Bocobo, barangay captain of Fort Bonifacio, ex-officio councilor/Liga ng mga Barangay President
- Noe Manila (Independent)
- Pammy Zamora, incumbent representative for the second district of Taguig

==== Results ====
2025 Second District Congressional Election
| Candidate | Party | Votes | % |
|---|---|---|---|
| Jorge Daniel Bocobo | Nacionalista Party | 144,014 | 53.62 |
| Pammy Zamora (incumbent) | Lakas–CMD | 116,489 | 43.37 |
| Noe Manila | Independent | 8,095 | 3.01 |
| Total | | 268,598 | 100.00 |
| Nacionalista Party gain from Lakas–CMD | | | |

==== Per Barangay ====
| Barangay | Bocobo | | Zamora | | Manila | |
| Barangay | Votes | % | Votes | % | Votes | % |
|---|---|---|---|---|---|---|
| Cembo | 4,445 | 35.86 | 7,148 | 57.67 | 802 | 6.47 |
| Central Bicutan | 9,114 | 63.38 | 5,030 | 34.98 | 235 | 1.63 |
| Central Signal Village | 11,461 | 58.38 | 7,840 | 39.93 | 331 | 1.69 |
| East Rembo | 4,329 | 33.62 | 7,806 | 60.63 | 740 | 5.75 |
| Fort Bonifacio | 5,252 | 62.44 | 2,520 | 29.96 | 639 | 7.60 |
| Katuparan | 5,853 | 59.61 | 3,812 | 38.83 | 153 | 1.56 |
| Maharlika | 5,109 | 64.39 | 2,659 | 33.51 | 166 | 2.09 |
| North Daang Hari | 4,173 | 61.49 | 2,535 | 37.35 | 79 | 1.16 |
| North Signal Village | 9,172 | 61.55 | 5,426 | 36.41 | 303 | 2.03 |
| Pinagsama | 13,804 | 56.86 | 9,790 | 40.33 | 682 | 2.81 |
| Pitogo | 2,182 | 35.45 | 3,672 | 59.65 | 302 | 4.91 |
| Post Proper Northside | 1,467 | 53.87 | 1,146 | 42.09 | 110 | 4.04 |
| Post Proper Southside | 5,697 | 52.53 | 4,659 | 42.96 | 490 | 4.52 |
| South Cembo | 2,233 | 34.96 | 3,845 | 60.20 | 309 | 4.84 |
| South Daang Hari | 6,289| | 57.52 | 4,520 | 41.34 | 124 | 1.13 |
| South Signal Village | 9,964 | 55.42 | 7,711 | 42.89 | 304 | 1.69 |
| Tanyag | 7,159 | 58.43 | 4,938 | 40.30 | 156 | 1.27 |
| Upper Bicutan | 11,463 | 56.76 | 8,453 | 41.85 | 280 | 1.39 |
| West Rembo | 4,573 | 31.71 | 8,972 | 62.21 | 878 | 6.09 |
| Western Bicutan | 20,275 | 57.45 | 14,007 | 39.69 | 1,012 | 2.87 |
| Total | 144,014 | 53.62 | 116,489 | 43.37 | 8,095 | 3.01 |

== City Council election ==
The Taguig City Council is currently composed of 18 members, 16 of which are elected through plurality block voting to serve three-year terms. The councilors represent the city's two councilor districts, which consist of Taguig barangays coextensive with the congressional districts, with eight members being elected per district.

After COMELEC's en banc resolution, which added the Embo barangays to the city council districts, the council will now have 26 members, 24 of which are to be elected between the two districts of the city, adding four new seats to each district.

=== Results ===
| Party | Votes | % | Seats |
|---|---|---|---|
| Nacionalista Party | 3,178,925 | 68.92 | 24 |
| Partido Federal ng Pilipinas | 884,749 | 19.18 | 0 |
| Makabayan | 25,436 | 0.55 | 0 |
| Partido Lakas ng Masa | 16,482 | 0.36 | 0 |
| Independent | 506,809 | 10.99 | 0 |
| Ex officio seats | | | 2 |
| Total | 4,612,401 | 100.00 | 26 |

=== First district ===
The first city council district is composed of the city's eastern barangays, namely Bagumbayan, Bambang, Calzada, Hagonoy, Ibayo-Tipas, Ligid-Tipas, Lower Bicutan, New Lower Bicutan, Napindan, Palingon, San Miguel, Santa Ana, Tuktukan, Ususan and Wawa. City Ordinance No. 144 passed by the city council, as adopted by COMELEC Resolution No. 11069, added the Embo barangays Comembo, Pembo, and Rizal to the district. The last election saw the administration coalition sweep the district, getting all eight seats.

==== Term-limited councilors ====
- Gloria Valenzuela-De Mesa

==== Results ====
2025 Taguig City Council election in the 1st district
| Candidate | Party or alliance | | Votes | % |
|---|---|---|---|---|
| Darwin Icay | Nacionalista Party (TLC) | | 146,059 | 59.10 |
| Allan Paul Cruz | Nacionalista Party (TLC) | | 140,415 | 56.82 |
| Jaime "Jimmy" Labampa (incumbent) | Nacionalista Party (TLC) | | 136,361 | 55.18 |
| Arnold "Sammy" Cruz | Nacionalista Party (TLC) | | 135,293 | 54.75 |
| Fanella Joy Panga-Cruz (incumbent) | Nacionalista Party (TLC) | | 130,231 | 52.70 |
| Rodil "Tikboy" Marcelino (incumbent) | Nacionalista Party (TLC) | | 122,699 | 49.65 |
| Gamaliel San Pedro (incumbent) | Nacionalista Party (TLC) | | 121,457 | 49.15 |
| Kim Abbang | Nacionalista Party (TLC) | | 121,298 | 49.08 |
| Carlito Ogalinola (incumbent) | Nacionalista Party (TLC) | | 116,729 | 47.23 |
| Raul "Commissioner" Aquino (incumbent) | Nacionalista Party (TLC) | | 115,067 | 46.56 |
| Ferdinand "Bro" Santos | Nacionalista Party (TLC) | | 114,261 | 46.24 |
| Lamberto "Totong" Mañosca (incumbent) | Nacionalista Party (TLC) | | 103,358 | 41.82 |
| Norjannah "Jannah" Cruz | Partido Federal ng Pilipinas (Team AMC) | | 59,540 | 24.09 |
| Paul Lontoc | Independent (Team AMC) | | 48,771 | 19.74 |
| Mark Bryan Beran | Bida Tayo | Independent | 44,822 | 18.14 |
| John John Bautista | Partido Federal ng Pilipinas (Team AMC) | | 41,533 | 16.81 |
| Mark Bacsain | Partido Federal ng Pilipinas (Team AMC) | | 40,017 | 16.19 |
| Warren Delos Santos | Partido Federal ng Pilipinas (Team AMC) | | 37,866 | 15.32 |
| Rico Palma | Bida Tayo | Independent | 37,063 | 15.00 |
| Maria Ana Santos | Partido Federal ng Pilipinas (Team AMC) | | 36,087 | 14.60 |
| Elvira Madrid | Partido Federal ng Pilipinas (Team AMC) | | 34,017 | 13.77 |
| RJ Bernal | Partido Federal ng Pilipinas (Team AMC) | | 32,946 | 13.33 |
| Rolando "Mogs" Gonzales | Partido Federal ng Pilipinas (Team AMC) | | 30,999 | 12.54 |
| Joshua Sanga | Partido Federal ng Pilipinas (Team AMC) | | 30,913 | 12.51 |
| Tristan Inan | Partido Federal ng Pilipinas (Team AMC) | | 28,801 | 11.65 |
| Henry Vera | Bida Tayo | Independent | 28,471 | 11.52 |
| Romeo Edgar Abaigar | Bida Tayo | Independent | 26,691 | 10.80 |
| Girlie Delos Santos | Makabayan | | 25,436 | 10.29 |
| Gerard Sumagpao | Partido Federal ng Pilipinas (Team AMC) | | 24,139 | 9.77 |
| Reinante Dela Paz | Independent | | 16,834 | 6.81 |
| Johnny Alvarida | Independent | | 15,771 | 6.38 |
| Total | | | 2,143,945 | 100.00 |

=== Second district ===
The second city council district is composed of the city's western barangays, namely Central Bicutan, Central Signal Village, Fort Bonifacio, Katuparan, Maharlika Village, North Daang Hari, North Signal Village, Pinagsama, South Daang Hari, South Signal Village, Tanyag, Upper Bicutan and Western Bicutan. City Ordinance No. 144 passed by the city council, as adopted by COMELEC Resolution No. 11069, added the Embo barangays Cembo, East Rembo, Pitogo, Post Proper Northside, Post Proper Southside, South Cembo, and West Rembo to the district. The last election saw the administration coalition sweep the district, getting all eight seats.

==== Term-limited councilors ====
- Jaime Garcia
- Yasser Pangandaman

==== Results ====
2025 Taguig City Council election in the 2nd district
| Candidate | Party | Votes | % |
|---|---|---|---|
| Gigi Bermas | Nacionalista Party (TLC) | 153,345 | 52.88 |
| Nicky Supan (incumbent) | Nacionalista Party (TLC) | 152,644 | 52.64 |
| Ivie Dizon | Nacionalista Party (TLC) | 147,600 | 50.90 |
| Danilo "Danny" Castro | Nacionalista Party (TLC) | 144,531 | 49.84 |
| Jomil Bryan Serna (incumbent) | Nacionalista Party (TLC) | 138,933 | 47.91 |
| Alex Penolio (incumbent) | Nacionalista Party (TLC) | 137,447 | 47.40 |
| Evelyn "Bing" Villamor | Nacionalista Party (TLC) | 136,530 | 47.08 |
| Gen Pau-Tin | Nacionalista Party (TLC) | 135,542 | 46.74 |
| Eduardo "Bro. Ed" Prado (incumbent) | Nacionalista Party (TLC) | 135,149 | 46.61 |
| Edgar Baptista (incumbent) | Nacionalista Party (TLC) | 129,420 | 44.63 |
| Iony De Lara-Bes | Nacionalista Party (TLC) | 128,061 | 44.16 |
| Marisse Balina-Eron (incumbent) | Nacionalista Party (TLC) | 127,855 | 44.09 |
| Gary Lester Valdez | Partido Federal ng Pilipinas (Team AMC) | 48,308 | 16.66 |
| Salvador Zamora III | Independent | 47,846 | 16.50 |
| Joel "KuyaSec" Advincula | Partido Federal ng Pilipinas (Team AMC) | 46,821 | 16.15 |
| Benedicto "Benny" Abatay | Partido Federal ng Pilipinas (Team AMC) | 44,854 | 15.47 |
| Basilio Pooten | Partido Federal ng Pilipinas (Team AMC) | 44,467 | 15.34 |
| Rodolfo "Dudong" San Pedro | Independent | 41,305 | 14.24 |
| Arthur Flores | Partido Federal ng Pilipinas (Team AMC) | 40,860 | 14.09 |
| Marilou "Lot" Bandejas | Partido Federal ng Pilipinas (Team AMC) | 40,802 | 14.07 |
| Angielyn "Angie" Bombase | Partido Federal ng Pilipinas (Team AMC) | 40,083 | 13.82 |
| Ignacio "Jun" Rivera | Partido Federal ng Pilipinas (Team AMC) | 39,863 | 13.75 |
| Glenn Sacay | Partido Federal ng Pilipinas (Team AMC) | 38,838 | 13.39 |
| Jude "Nognog" Acepcion | Partido Federal ng Pilipinas (Team AMC) | 35,180 | 12.13 |
| Armando "Arman" Ercillo | Partido Federal ng Pilipinas (Team AMC) | 34,135 | 11.77 |
| Paolo Cabrera | Independent | 33,435 | 11.53 |
| Lylani "Lani" Calvadores | Partido Federal ng Pilipinas (Team AMC) | 32,880 | 11.34 |
| Cosme De Asis | Independent | 28,946 | 9.98 |
| Edgardo "Sonny" Daria | Independent | 23,396 | 8.07 |
| Juanito "Ram" Aggalut | Independent | 21,392 | 7.38 |
| Arthur Clavo | Independent | 21,319 | 7.35 |
| Abraham Anunciacion | Independent | 17,990 | 6.20 |
| Isidro "Sid" Capurcos | Independent | 17,068 | 5.89 |
| Perlisita Magallano | Independent | 16,447 | 5.67 |
| Jerry Tan | Partido Lakas ng Masa | 16,482 | 5.68 |
| Caleb Tibio | Independent | 14,841 | 5.12 |
| Cupid Demafiles | Independent | 13,931 | 4.80 |
| Total | | 2,468,546 | 100.00 |
