= 2022 Taguig local elections =

6th city election in Taguig

2022 Taguig mayoral elections
- May 9, 2022
- Turnout: 82.56% ▲15.36 pp
Nominee	Lani Cayetano	Arnel Cerafica
Party	Nacionalista	PPP
Running mate	Arvin Alit	Janelle Cerafica
Popular vote	272,876	87,266
Percentage	75.77%	24.23%
Mayor before election
Lino Cayetano
Nacionalista
Elected mayor
Lani Cayetano
Nacionalista
- Vice mayoral election
Candidate	Arvin Alit	Janelle Cerafica
Party	Nacionalista	PPP
Alliance	TLC	Team AMC
Popular vote	232,034	105,157
Percentage	68.81%	31.19%
Vice Mayor before election
Ricardo "Ading" Cruz Jr.
Nacionalista
Elected Vice Mayor
Arvin Alit
Nacionalista
- City Council election

16 of 18 seats in the Taguig City Council 9 seats needed for a majority
	First party	Second party
Party	Nacionalista	PPP
Alliance	TLC	Team AMC
Last election	16 seats, 62.97%	Did Not Contest
Seats won	16	0
Seat change	Steady	Steady
Popular vote	1,617,292	608,912
Percentage	69.03%	25.99%

Local elections in Taguig took place on May 9, 2022 within the Philippine general election. The voters will vote for the elective local posts in the city: the mayor, vice mayor, two district representatives, and councilors, eight in each of the city's two legislative districts.

== Background ==
Mayor Lino Edgardo Cayetano was eligible for re-election for second term as mayor. However, he decided not to seek reelection. His sister-in-law, former Mayor and Second District Rep. Ma. Laarni "Lani" Cayetano sought mayorship again, having previously held the position from 2010 to 2019. He was challenged by defeated 2019 mayoral candidate and former First District Rep. Arnel Cerafica.

Vice Mayor Ricardo "Ading" Cruz was term-limited.He ran as representative instead. His party chosen Second District Councilor Arvin Ian Alit to run in his place. Alit was challenged by Janelle Cerafica, running-mate and wife of mayoral candidate Arnel Cerafica.

First District Rep. Alan Peter Cayetano who was on his first term as representative, chose to ran as senator instead. His party fielded Vice Mayor Ricardo "Ading" Cruz who was term-limited. Cruz faced defeated 2019 congressional candidate Allan Cerafica, brother of mayoral candidate and former First District Rep. Arnel Cerafica.

Second District Rep. Ma. Laarni "Lani" Cayetano who was on her first term as representative, decided to ran as mayor instead. Her party chosen three-termer Councilor Maria Amparo "Pammy" Zamora, daughter of term-limited San Juan Rep. Ronaldo "Ronny" Zamora. Zamora faced former Councilor and defeated 2019 congressional candidate Michelle Anne "Cheche" Gonzales, who ran in the same position thrice.

== Candidates ==
=== Administration coalition ===
TLC (Team Lani Cayetano)
#	Name	Party
For Mayor
1.	Maria Laarni "Lani" Cayetano	Nacionalista
For Vice Mayor
1.	Arvin Ian Alit	Nacionalista
For House Of Representatives (1st District/Taguig-Pateros)
2.	Ricardo "Ading" Cruz Jr.	Nacionalista
For House Of Representatives (2nd District/Taguig–Lone)
2.	Maria Amparo "Pammy" Zamora	Nacionalista
For Councilor (1st District)
2.	Raul Aquino	Nacionalista
6.	Gigi Valenzuela-De Mesa	Nacionalista
11.	Jimmy Labampa	Nacionalista
14.	Lamberto "Totong" Mañosca	Nacionalista
15.	Rodil Marcelino	Nacionalista
16.	Carlito Ogalinola	Nacionalista
18.	Fanella Joy Panga-Cruz	Nacionalista
19.	Gamaliel San Pedro	Nacionalista
For Councilor (2nd District)
1.	Marisse Balina-Eron	Nacionalista
3.	Edgar Baptista	Nacionalista
7.	Jaime Garcia	Nacionalista
11.	Yasser Pangandaman	Nacionalista
12.	Alex Penolio	Nacionalista
14.	Ed Prado	Nacionalista
17.	Jomil Bryan Serna	Nacionalista
19.	Nicky Supan	Nacionalista

=== Primary opposition coalition ===
Team AMC
#	Name	Party
For Mayor
2.	Arnel Cerafica	PPP
For Vice Mayor
2.	Janelle Cerafica	PPP
For House Of Representatives (1st District/Taguig-Pateros)
1.	Allan Cerafica	PPP
For House Of Representatives (2nd District/Taguig–Lone)
1.	Michelle Anne "Che-Che" Gonzales	PPP
For Councilor (1st District)
3.	Jhon Jhon Bautista	PPP
4.	RJ Bernal	PPP
5.	Norjannah Cruz	PPP
7.	Warren Delos Santos	PPP
8.	Warren Dionisio	PPP
9.	Ronette Osorio Franco	PPP
10.	Anggus Icay	PPP
13.	Elvira Madrid	PPP
For Councilor (2nd District)
4.	Oscar Dio	PPP
5.	Arthur Flores	PPP
8.	Larry German	PPP
10.	Jay Morales	PPP
13.	Basilio Pooten	PPP
15.	Ignacio Rivera Jr.	PPP
16.	Glenn Sacay	PPP
21.	Myla Valencia	PPP

=== Other candidates ===
#	Name	Party
For Councilor (1st District)
1.	Inocentes Amoroso	Independent
12.	Paul Lontoc	Independent
17.	Mar Norbert Osorio	Independent
For Councilor (2nd District)
2.	Felomino Balmes	PLM
6.	Toroy Francisco	Independent
9.	Darius Lim	Independent
18.	Milly Somera	PPM
20.	Caleb Tibio	Independent

== Results ==
=== For Mayor ===
Second District Rep. Ma. Laarni "Lani" Cayetano defeated former First District Rep. Arnel Cerafica. Cerafica lost to outgoing Mayor Lino Edgardo Cayetano in the last election.

Taguig Mayoralty Election
Party	Candidate	Votes	%
Nacionalista	Lani Cayetano	272,876	75.77
PPP	Arnel Cerafica	87,266	24.23
Total votes		360,142	100.00
Nacionalista hold			

==== Per Barangay ====
Barangay	Cayetano		Cerafica	
Barangay	Votes	%	Votes	%
Bagumbayan	16,322	80.48	3,959	19.52
Bambang	3,860	70.68	1,601	29.32
Calzada	7,579	71.07	3,085	28.93
Central Bicutan	10,620	79.31	2,770	20.69
Central Signal Village	14,790	75.64	4,764	24.36
Fort Bonifacio	7,775	78.85	2,086	21.15
Hagonoy	8,245	76.89	2,478	23.11
Ibayo-Tipas	6,141	68.28	2,853	31.72
Katuparan	7,124	75.84	2,269	24.16
Ligid-Tipas	3,998	72.96	1,482	27.04
Lower Bicutan	18,549	75.71	5,950	24.29
Maharlika	6,500	83.90	1,247	16.10
Napindan	6,601	68.94	2,974	31.06
New Lower Bicutan	15,151	76.39	4,683	23.61
North Daang Hari	5,109	81.38	1,169	18.62
North Signal Village	11,649	79.89	2,933	20.11
Palingon	4,198	60.87	2,699	39.13
Pinagsama	16,303	74.79	5,494	25.21
San Miguel	3,132	77.14	928	22.86
Santa Ana	6,584	67.03	3,238	32.97
South Daang Hari	7,775	78.50	2,130	21.50
South Signal Village	13,061	75.62	4,211	24.38
Tanyag	9,639	84.74	1,736	15.26
Tuktukan	4,885	74.89	1,638	25.11
Upper Bicutan	14,055	74.72	4,754	25.28
Ususan	12,455	78.96	3,319	21.04
Wawa	4,840	79.20	1,271	20.80
Western Bicutan	25,482	72.96	9,443	27.04
Total	272,876	75.77	87,266	24.23

=== For Vice Mayor ===
Second District Councilor Arvin Ian Alit won over Janelle Cerafica, wife of Arnel Cerafica.

Taguig Vice Mayoralty Election
Party	Candidate	Votes	%
Nacionalista	Arvin Ian Alit	232,034	68.81
PPP	Janelle Cerafica	105,157	31.19
Total votes		337,191	100.00
Nacionalista hold			

==== Per Barangay ====
Barangay	Alit		Cerafica	
Barangay	Votes	%	Votes	%
Bagumbayan	13,419	71.40	5,374	28.60
Bambang	3,208	62.67	1,911	37.33
Calzada	6,297	62.83	3,725	37.17
Central Bicutan	8,967	70.24	3,800	29.76
Central Signal Village	13,131	70.74	5,431	29.26
Fort Bonifacio	6,279	70.77	2,594	29.23
Hagonoy	7,028	69.17	3,132	30.83
Ibayo-Tipas	5,082	60.26	3,352	39.74
Katuparan	6,250	70.72	2,588	29.28
Ligid-Tipas	3,250	63.73	1,850	36.27
Lower Bicutan	15,374	66.73	7,666	33.27
Maharlika	5,335	76.25	1,662	23.75
Napindan	5,338	60.34	3,509	39.66
New Lower Bicutan	12,829	68.72	5,840	31.28
North Daang Hari	4,417	75.31	1,448	24.69
North Signal Village	10,314	74.89	3,458	25.11
Palingon	3,415	52.87	3,044	47.13
Pinagsama	13,596	67.33	6,596	32.67
San Miguel	2,642	69.54	1,157	30.46
Santa Ana	5,383	58.19	3,868	41.81
South Daang Hari	6,960	74.88	2,335	25.12
South Signal Village	11,439	70.02	4,898	29.98
Tanyag	8,494	79.93	2,133	20.07
Tuktukan	4,104	67.44	1,981	32.56
Upper Bicutan	12,663	70.63	5,266	29.37
Ususan	10,210	70.32	4,309	29.68
Wawa	4,091	71.55	1,627	28.45
Western Bicutan	22,131	67.85	10,486	32.15
Total	232,034	68.81	105,157	31.19

=== For Representatives ===
==== First District (Taguig-Pateros) ====
Vice Mayor Ricardo "Ading" Cruz Jr. defeated Allan Cerafica, who ran in the same position last elections.

Congressional Elections in Taguig's First District
Party	Candidate	Votes	%
Nacionalista	Ricardo "Ading" Cruz Jr.	87,954	58.25
PPP	Allan Cerafica	63,033	41.75
Total votes		150,987	100.00
Nacionalista gain from Independent			

==== Per Barangay ====
Barangay	Cruz Jr.		Cerafica	
Barangay	Votes	%	Votes	%
Bagumbayan	11,906	65.01	6,408	34.99
Bambang	2,749	54.51	2,294	45.49
Calzada	5,339	54.16	4,518	45.84
Hagonoy	6,119	62.17	3,723	37.83
Ibayo-Tipas	3,902	47.35	4,338	52.65
Ligid-Tipas	2,820	55.09	2,299	44.91
Lower Bicutan	13,601	59.68	9,188	40.32
Napindan	4,359	50.81	4,220	49.19
New Lower Bicutan	11,149	61.09	7,102	38.91
Palingon	2,659	41.00	3,827	59.00
San Miguel	2,280	61.81	1,409	38.19
Santa Ana	4,673	51.42	4,415	48.58
Tuktukan	3,697	61.47	2,317	38.53
Ususan	8,973	63.51	5,155	36.49
Wawa	3,728	67.20	1,820	32.80
Total	87,954	58.25	63,033	41.75

==== Second District (Taguig Lone) ====
Councilor Maria Amparo "Pammy" Zamora defeated former Councilor Michelle Anne "Cheche" Gonzales.

Congressional Elections in Taguig's Second District
Party	Candidate	Votes	%
Nacionalista	Maria Amparo "Pammy" Zamora	121,179	68.75
PPP	Michelle Anne "Cheche" Gonzales	55,089	31.25
Total votes		176,268	100.00
Nacionalista hold			

==== Per Barangay ====
Barangay	Zamora		Gonzales	
Barangay	Votes	%	Votes	%
Central Bicutan	8,406	68.27	3,907	31.73
Central Signal Village	12,215	68.00	5,749	32.00
Fort Bonifacio	5,844	68.85	2,644	31.15
Katuparan	5,906	69.12	2,639	30.88
Maharlika	5,072	76.66	1,544	23.34
North Daang Hari	4,116	71.91	1,608	28.09
North Signal Village	9,780	73.56	3,515	26.44
Pinagsama	13,431	70.26	5,686	29.74
South Daang Hari	6,329	70.53	2,645	29.47
South Signal Village	10,735	68.20	5,006	31.80
Tanyag	7,762	76.05	2,445	23.95
Upper Bicutan	11,347	64.92	6,132	35.08
Western Bicutan	19,890	63.49	11,439	36.51
Total	121,179	68.75	55,089	31.25

Party	Votes	%	Seats
Nacionalista Party	209,133	63.91	2
Partido Pilipino sa Pagbabago	118,122	36.09	0
Total	327,255	100.00	2

=== For Councilors ===
Party	Votes	%	Seats
Nacionalista Party	1,617,292	69.03	16
Partido Pilipino sa Pagbabago	608,912	25.99	0
Partido Lakas ng Masa	14,368	0.61	0
Partido Pederal ng Maharlika	13,502	0.58	0
Independent	88,929	3.80	0
Ex officio seats			2
Total	2,343,003	100.00	18

==== First District ====
City Council Elections in Taguig's First District
Party	Candidate	Votes	%
Nacionalista	Jaime "Jimmy" Labampa	105,771	28.51
Nacionalista	Baby Gloria "Gigi" De Mesa	105,617	28.47
Nacionalista	Rodil Carlos "Tikboy" Marcelino	96,695	26.06
Nacionalista	Fanella Joy Panga-Cruz	94,514	25.48
Nacionalista	Gamaliel "Gamie" San Pedro	94,111	25.37
Nacionalista	Carlito "Oga" Ogalinola	93,044	25.08
Nacionalista	Raul Aquino	85,159	22.95
Nacionalista	Lamberto "Totong" Mañosca	83,719	22.57
PPP	Anggus Rowe Icay	50,475	13.61
PPP	Warren Dionisio	41,554	11.20
PPP	Norjannah Cruz	38,925	10.49
PPP	Warren Delos Santos	35,586	9.59
PPP	Ronette Osorio Franco	35,560	9.59
PPP	Jhon Jhon Bautista	33,826	9.12
PPP	RJ Bernal	27,270	7.35
Independent	Paul Lontoc	24,923	6.72
PPP	Elvira Madrid	24,620	6.64
Independent	Mar Norbert Osorio	12,696	3.42
Independent	Inocentes Amoroso	10,681	2.88
Total votes		1,094,746	100.00

Party	Votes	%	Seats
Nacionalista Party	758,630	69.30	8
Partido Pilipino sa Pagbabago	287,816	26.29	0
Independent	48,300	4.41	0
Total	1,094,746	100.00	8

==== Second District ====
City Council Elections in Taguig's Second District
Party	Candidate	Votes	%
Nacionalista	Nicky Supan	124,188	33.40
Nacionalista	Jaime Garcia	115,437	31.05
Nacionalista	Marisse Balina- Eron	113,376	30.49
Nacionalista	Yasser Pangandaman	110,370	29.64
Nacionalista	Jomil Bryan Serna	100,883	27.14
Nacionalista	Eduardo "Ed" Prado	99,564	26.78
Nacionalista	Edgar Baptista	98,315	26.44
Nacionalista	Alexander "Alex" Penolio	96,529	25.94
PPP	Milagros "Myla" Valencia	55,633	14.97
PPP	Lauro "Larry" German	41,735	11.23
PPP	Jay Morales	41,468	11.16
PPP	Oscar Dio	38,467	10.35
PPP	Ignacio Rivera Jr.	37,078	9.98
PPP	Glenn Sacay	36,651	9.86
PPP	Basilio Pooten	36,433	9.81
PPP	Arthur Flores	33,631	9.05
Independent	Toroy Francisco	15,142	4.07
Independent	Darius Lim	14,522	3.90
PLM	Felomino Balmes	14,368	3.86
PPM	Milly Somera	13,502	3.63
Independent	Caleb Tibio	10,965	2.95
Total votes		1,248,257	100.00

Party	Votes	%	Seats
Nacionalista Party	858,662	68.79	8
Partido Pilipino sa Pagbabago	321,096	25.72	0
Independent	40,629	3.25	0
Partido Lakas ng Masa	14,368	1.15	0
Partido Pederal ng Maharlika	13,502	1.08	0
Total	1,248,257	100.00	8
