= Taguig City Hall =

Government building in Taguig, Philippines

- Bulwagang Panlungsod ng Taguig
- Facade of the Taguig City Hall as of August 2026
- Interactive map of the Taguig City Hall area

General information
- Status: Under construction
- Location: Cayetano Boulevard, Ususan, Taguig, Philippines
- Coordinates: 14°31′44″N 121°04′12″E
- Groundbreaking: June 29, 2019
- Owner: City of Taguig

Technical details
- Floor count: 17

The Taguig City Hall is the seat of the Taguig city government, located along Pedro Cayetano Boulevard, Ususan, Taguig. Construction of the current building started in 2019, and the building was opened by phases: first the convention center, then the city council session hall, gallery and offices. The building houses the office of the Mayor of Taguig and the chambers of the Taguig City Council.

Despite construction starting in 2019, the fourth city hall remains unfinished as of 2026. However, some parts of the building are currently in use by the city government.

== History ==
=== Old Municipal and City Halls ===
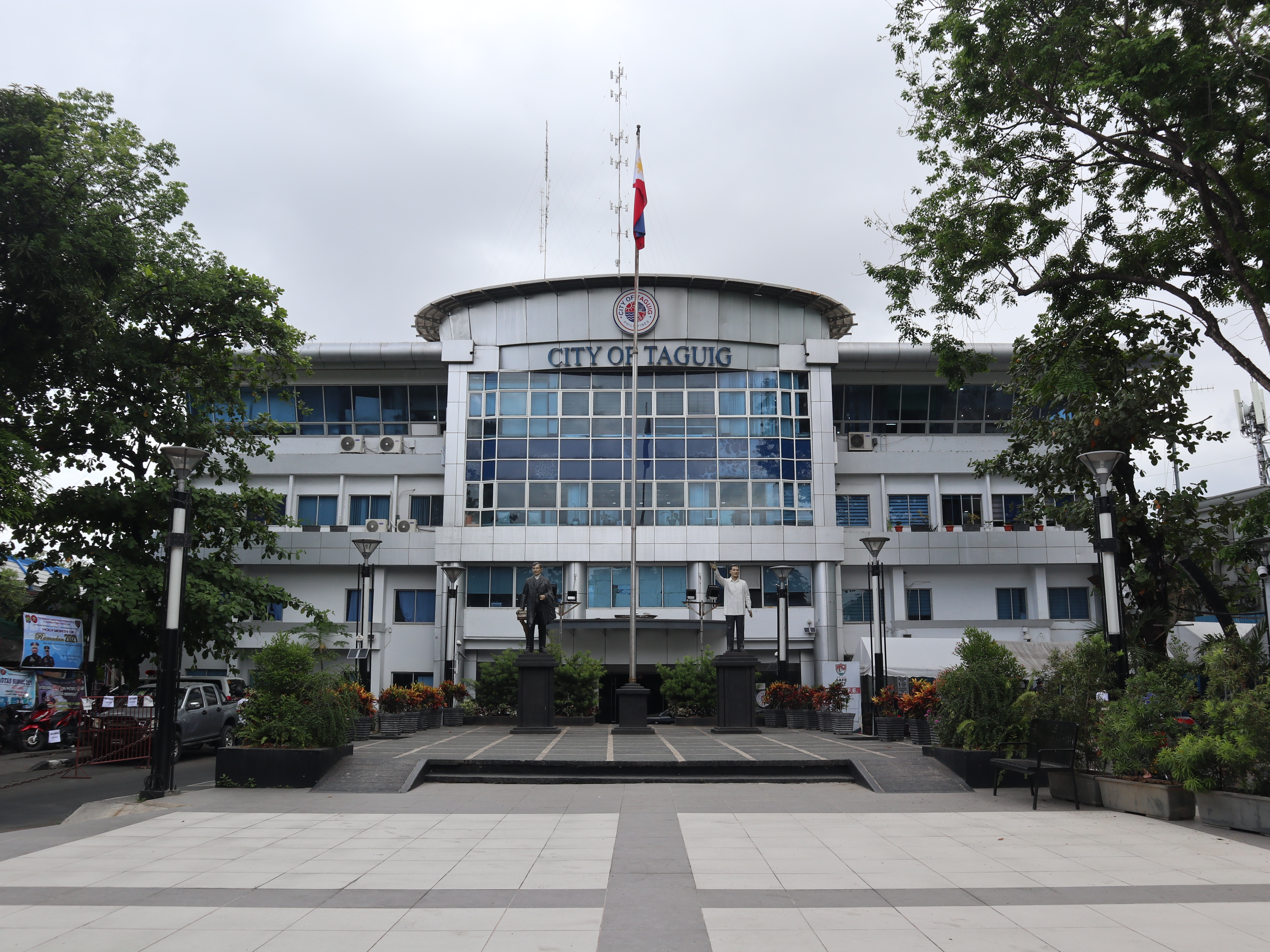
The third Taguig City Hall in Tuktukan served as the seat of government of Taguig from 1959 to 2026.

The first municipal hall of Taguig was built in barrio Santa Ana, one of the nine original barrios of the city. It was erected on 1892 at the site of what is now Plaza Quezon. The second municipal hall, constructed in 1928, was erected in front of the Santa Ana Church.

Later on, the local government of Taguig moved to its third municipal (and now city) hall located at Gen. Luna Street in Tuktukan. The third edifice was constructed in 1959 and has been renovated three times.

=== New City Hall ===
The fourth Taguig City Hall seen under-construction as of October 2025.

Groundbreaking for the construction of the fourth Taguig City Hall was held on June 25, 2019. Located along Pedro Cayetano Boulevard in Ususan, it was targeted for completion on 2021 but it did not meet its target completion date due to the COVID-19 pandemic. The building is being constructed by phases. On March 27, 2025, the new Council Session Hall, City Council Session Hall Gallery, and Function Rooms were opened.

On June 26, 2025, Taguig City Mayor Lani Cayetano, together with her sister-in-law, Senator Pia Cayetano, took their oath before Chief Justice Alexander Gesmundo at the Council Session Hall, following their re-election. It is a historic first for the city and was attended by Senate President Francis Escudero and Senators Alan Peter Cayetano and Joel Villanueva.

== Architecture ==
Taguig City Hall is a modern edifice. The mayor's office and the mayor's staff workplace from 12th and 15th floors are inspired by the "bahay na bato" architecture. Its interiors were replete with details paying homage to the city being a "Probinsyudad". The 12th to 15th floors will be a rectangular glass box punctuated with stainless ventanillas.

The city hall has a convention center with a seating capacity of 600, a food court, a gymnasium and a garden on the 4th and 17th floors. It also has a garden-pond, and meeting pavilions. The parking podium can accommodate more than 300 cars and 200 motorcycles. The building is PWD-friendly and women-friendly, with women's toilets being larger than men's to avoid long queues. The building has small and big meeting rooms on every floors that can accommodate 8 and 20 persons, respectively.
