= Legislative districts of Pateros–Taguig =

Legislative districts in the Philippines

The legislative district of Pateros–Taguig is the combined representation of the independent municipality of Pateros and eastern part of the highly urbanized city of Taguig in the Congress of the Philippines. The city and municipality are currently represented in the lower house of the Congress through their lone congressional district.

== History ==
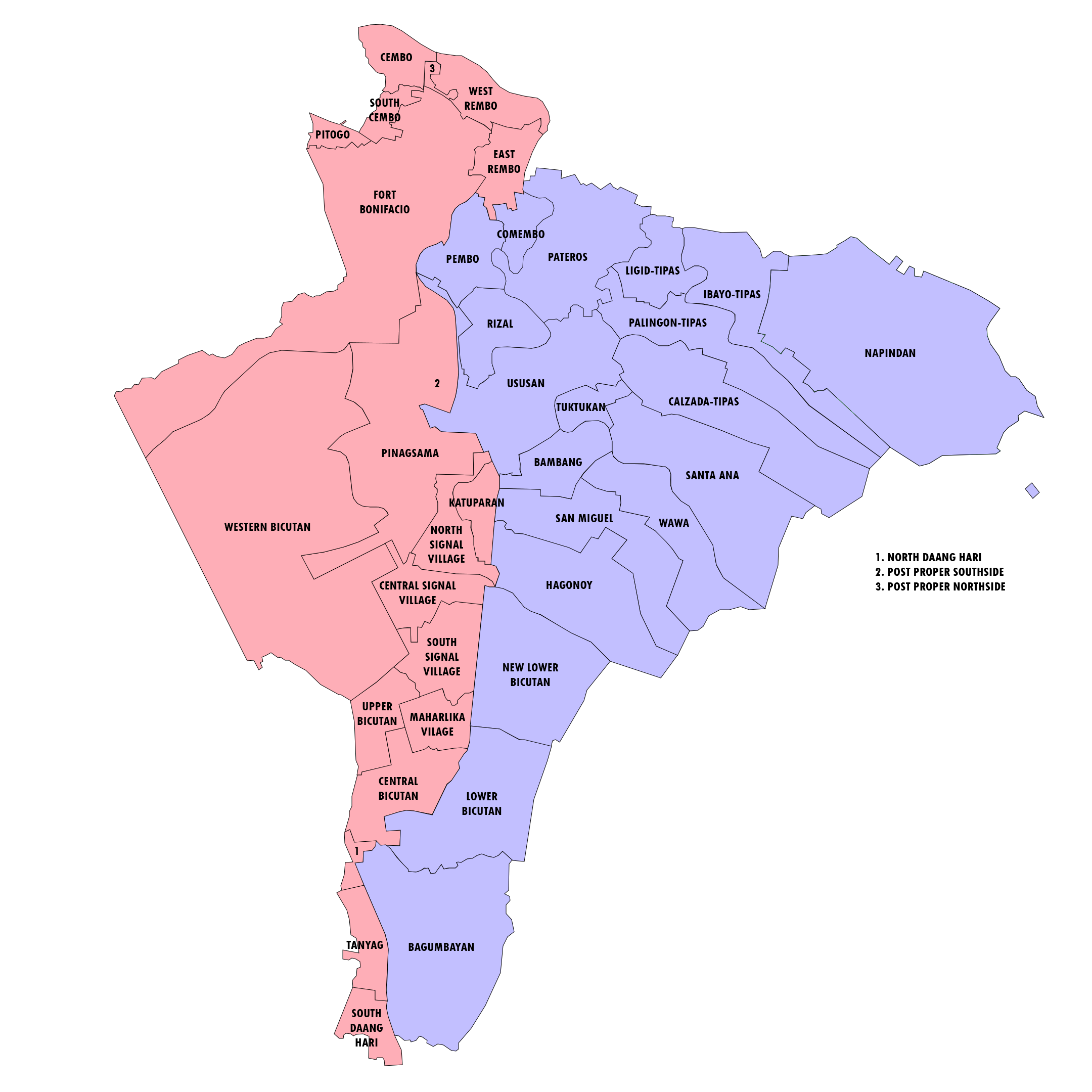
Legislative districts of the combined representation of Taguig–Pateros First District Second District

Areas now under the jurisdiction of Taguig and Pateros were initially represented as part of the at-large district of the province of Manila in the Malolos Congress from 1898 to 1899. Both towns were later incorporated to the province of Rizal, established in 1901, and were represented as part of the first district of Rizal from 1907 to 1941 and from 1945 to 1972. During World War II, both towns were represented as part of the at-large district of Rizal in the National Assembly of the Second Philippine Republic from 1943 to 1944. Taguig and Pateros were separated from Rizal on November 7, 1975, by virtue of Presidential Decree No. 824, and was represented in the Interim Batasang Pambansa along with other Metropolitan Manila municipalities and cities as part of Region IV from 1978 to 1984.

Taguig and Pateros were grouped with Muntinlupa to form a single parliamentary district which returned one representative to the Regular Batasang Pambansa in 1984. Taguig and Pateros formed one congressional district under the new Constitution proclaimed on February 11, 1987; it elected its member to the restored House of Representatives starting that same year.

The western area of Taguig, coterminous with the Second Councilor District of Taguig (for the purpose of electing municipal, now city, council members), was separated to form a separate congressional district by virtue of Republic Act No. 8487, the law which converted Taguig into a highly urbanized city. Despite being enacted by Congress on February 11, 1998, the said law only took effect on December 8, 2004, after the Commission on Elections issued a resolution confirming that the affirmative votes for cityhood prevailed in the ballot recount. This new district first elected its separate representative in the 2007 general elections.

There was a boundary dispute over which city has jurisdiction over lands encompassed within the former Fort McKinley U.S. Military Reservation (now Fort Bonifacio and its surrounding areas). Portions of four of Taguig's barangays (Fort Bonifacio, Pinagsama, Western Bicutan, and Ususan) were claimed by the neighboring city of Makati as part of its own two barangays (Post Proper Northside and Post Proper Southside). Residents of areas where Taguig exercise de facto control vote as part of its second congressional district except for areas under barangay Ususan, which is part of Taguig's 1st district, while residents of areas where Makati exercises de facto control vote as part of its second congressional district.

== Current districts ==
Nacionalista (1)

Legislative Districts and Congressional Representatives of Taguig City-Pateros
District	Current Representative	Barangays	Population (2020)	Map
Taguig–Pateros (1st District)	Ricardo Cruz Jr. (since 2022); Lower Bicutan	List: Aguho (Pateros); Bagumbayan; Bambang; Calzada; Comembo; Hagonoy; Ibayo-Tipas; Ligid-Tipas; Lower Bicutan; Magtanggol; Martires del 96; New Lower Bicutan; Napindan; Palingon; Pateros (Pob.); Pembo; Rizal; San Miguel; San Pedro; San Roque (Pateros); Santa Ana (Pateros); Santa Ana (Taguig); Santo Rosario–Kanluran (Pateros); Santo Rosario–Silangan (Pateros); Tabacalera; Tuktukan; Ususan; Wawa	484,906	

== Historical districts ==
Period	Representative	Constituents
8th Congress; 1987–1992	Dante O. Tinga	Pateros, Taguig (became city in 2004)
9th Congress; 1992–1995	Dante O. Tinga	Pateros, Taguig (became city in 2004)
10th Congress; 1995–1998	Dante O. Tinga	Pateros, Taguig (became city in 2004)
11th Congress; 1998–2001	Alan Peter S. Cayetano	Pateros, Taguig (became city in 2004)
12th Congress; 2001–2004	Alan Peter S. Cayetano	Pateros, Taguig (became city in 2004)
13th Congress; 2004–2007	Alan Peter S. Cayetano	Pateros, Taguig (became city in 2004)

== See also ==
- Legislative districts of Taguig
