= Taguig City Council =

Legislative body of Taguig City, Philippines

Taguig City Council Sangguniang Panlungsod ng Tagig
- 8th Sangguniang Panlungsod ng Taguig
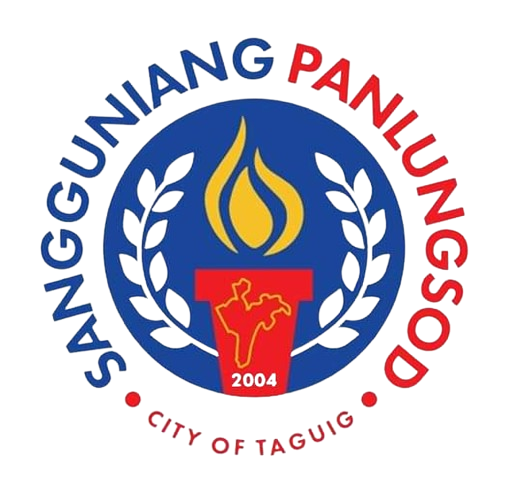

Type
- Type: Unicameral
- Term limits: 3 terms (9 years)

Leadership
- Presiding Officer: Arvin Ian Alit, Nacionalista since June 30, 2022
- Presiding Officer pro tempore: Marisse Balina-Eron, Nacionalista since June 30, 2022
- Majority Leader: Fanella Joy Panga-Cruz, Nacionalista since June 30, 2025
- Minority Leader: vacant since June 30, 2016

Structure
- Seats: 26 councilors (including 2 ex officio members); 1 ex officio presiding officer
- Political groups: Majority bloc (26): Nacionalista (24); Nonpartisan (2)
- Length of term: 3 years
- Authority: Taguig City Charter; Local Government Code of the Philippines

Elections
- Voting system: Plurality-at-large voting (24 seats); Indirect elections (2 seats)
- Last election: May 12, 2025
- Next election: May 15, 2028

Meeting place
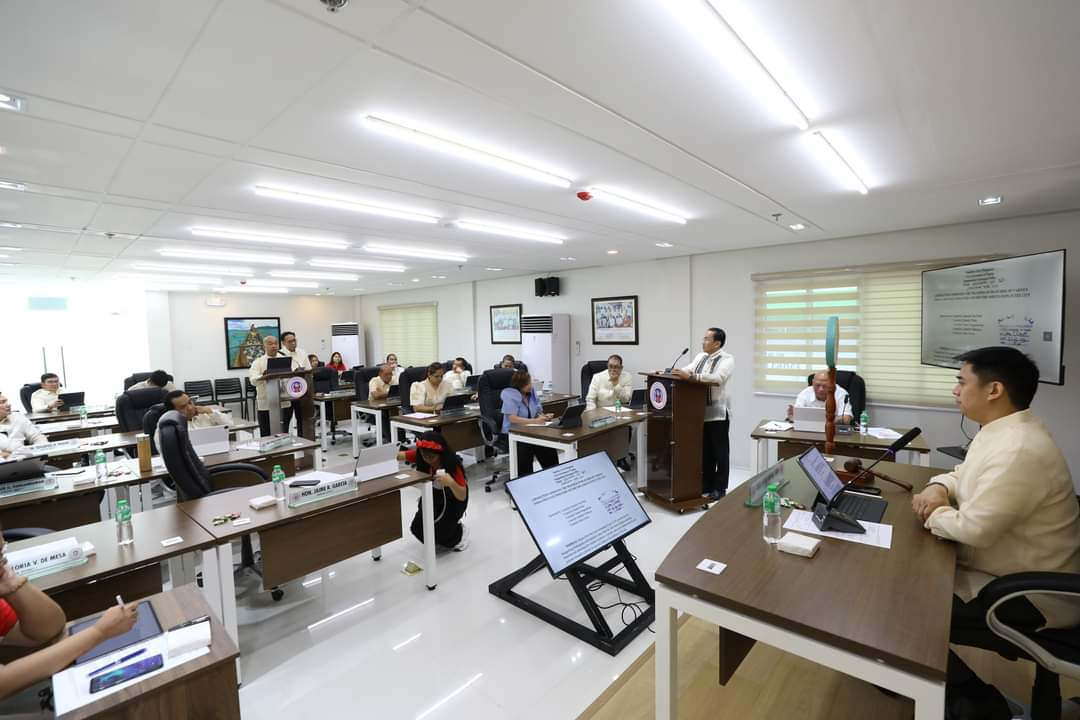
- Taguig City Council Building (Tuktukan); SP Session Hall, New Taguig City Hall (Ususan) Alternative meeting places: Taguig Lakeshore Hall (Lower Bicutan); SM Aura Satellite Office (Fort Bonifacio); Taguig City Convention Center (Ususan)

Website
- https://sp.taguig.gov.ph

The Taguig City Council (Filipino: Sangguniang Panlungsod ng Tagig) is the legislature of Taguig, Philippines. The legislative body is composed of 26 councilors, with 24 councilors elected from Taguig's two councilor districts (coextensive with the Legislative districts of Taguig and Taguig–Pateros, excluding the municipality of Pateros) and two elected from the ranks of barangay (neighborhood) chairmen and the Sangguniang Kabataan (youth councils). The council's presiding officer is the vice-mayor (elected by the city). The council is responsible for creating laws and ordinances under the jurisdiction of Taguig. Although the mayor can veto proposed bills, the council can override the veto with a two-thirds supermajority.

== Seat ==
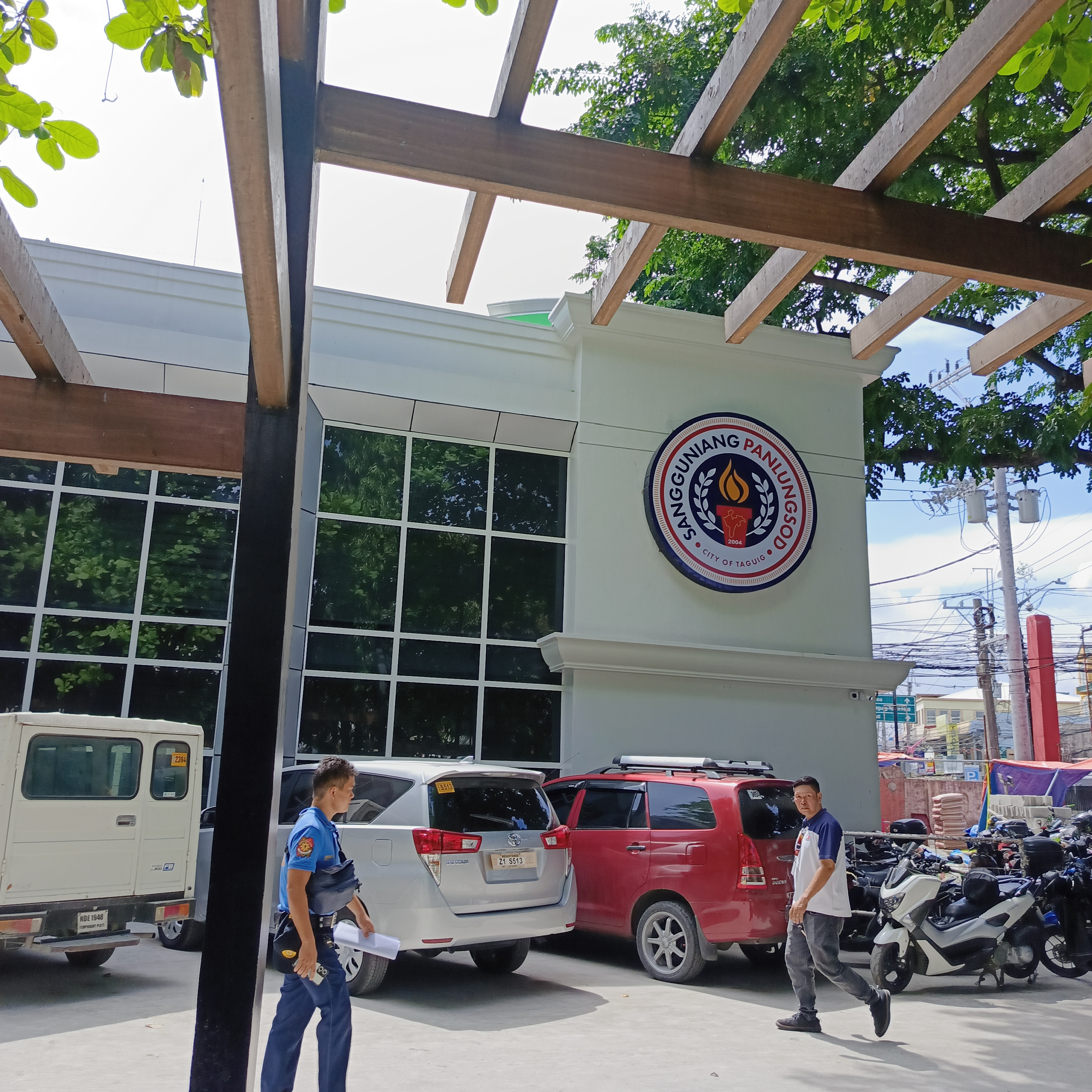
Façade of Taguig Sangguniang Panlungsod Building

The Taguig City Council meets at the Taguig City Council Building, a separate building inside the City Hall compound in Barangay Tuktukan. Their new session hall, located at the 5th to 7th floor of the new city hall in Barangay Ususan, was inaugurated on March 27, 2025.

Additionally, it also holds its sessions and other committee hearings and meetings at the Taguig Lakeshore Hall in Barangay Lower Bicutan, the Taguig City Satellite Office at SM Aura Tower in Bonifacio Global City, and the Taguig City Convention Center in Barangay Ususan, mostly during the construction period of its new session hall.

== Membership ==
The city elects sixteen members of the council, with eight members for each of the two local districts. In plurality-at-large voting, a voter in a particular district may vote for up to 8 candidates and the top 8 candidates with the highest numbers of votes are elected. Barangay and SK chairs throughout the city each elect a representative to the council, for a total of 18 councilors. City-council elections are synchronized with other elections in the country, which have been held on the second Monday of May every third year since 1992.

For the 2025 Taguig local elections, the Taguig City Council had informed the Commission on Elections (COMELEC) that it is in the process of passing a city ordinance to reallocate the Embo barangays, which are previously part of Makati, between the two city council districts. This ordinance would add two councilors per district, bringing the total number of elected city councilors to 20. The City Council started committee hearings on September 14, 2024 regarding the passing of an Ordinance incorporating the Embo barangays into the two existing districts of the city, attended by all barangay captains, District 1 Rep. Ading Cruz and Senator Alan Peter Cayetano. The proposed ordinance increases the number of councilors in each district from 8 to 12, for a total of 24 elected city councilors.

City Council Districts
1st District	2nd District
Bagumbayan	Cembo
Bambang	Central Bicutan
Calzada	Central Signal Village
Comembo	East Rembo
Hagonoy	Fort Bonifacio
Ibayo-Tipas	Katuparan
Ligid-Tipas	Maharlika
Lower Bicutan	North Daang Hari
New Lower Bicutan	North Signal Village
Napindan	Pinagsama
Palingon	Pitogo
Pembo	Post Proper Northside
Rizal	Post Proper Southside
San Miguel	South Cembo
Santa Ana	South Daang Hari
Tuktukan	South Signal Village
Ususan	Tanyag
Wawa	Upper Bicutan
	West Rembo
	Western Bicutan

=== Current members (2025–2028) ===
Position	Name	Party
Presiding Officer (Vice Mayor)	Arvin Ian Alit	Nacionalista
First District Councilors	Kim Abbang	Nacionalista
First District Councilors	Raul Aquino	Nacionalista
First District Councilors	Allan Paul Cruz	Nacionalista
First District Councilors	Arnold Cruz	Nacionalista
First District Councilors	Darwin Icay	Nacionalista
First District Councilors	Jaime Labampa	Nacionalista
First District Councilors	Lamberto Mañosca	Nacionalista
First District Councilors	Rodil Marcelino	Nacionalista
First District Councilors	Carlito Ogalinola	Nacionalista
First District Councilors	Fanella Joy Panga-Cruz	Nacionalista
First District Councilors	Gamaliel San Pedro	Nacionalista
First District Councilors	Ferdinand Santos	Nacionalista
Second District Councilors	Marisse Balina-Eron	Nacionalista
Second District Councilors	Edgar Baptista	Nacionalista
Second District Councilors	Gigi Bermas	Nacionalista
Second District Councilors	Danilo Castro	Nacionalista
Second District Councilors	Iony De Lara-Bes	Nacionalista
Second District Councilors	Ivie Dizon	Nacionalista
Second District Councilors	Gen Pau-Tin	Nacionalista
Second District Councilors	Alexander Penolio	Nacionalista
Second District Councilors	Eduardo Prado	Nacionalista
Second District Councilors	Jomil Bryan Serna	Nacionalista
Second District Councilors	Nicky Supan	Nacionalista
Second District Councilors	Evelyn Villamor	Nacionalista
ABC President	Marie Marcelino (Ususan)	Nonpartisan
SK President	Joanna Mae Pagkalinawan (Sta. Ana)	Nonpartisan
