= Partido Pilipino sa Pagbabago =

Political party in the Philippines based in Mindanao

- Abbreviation: PPP
- Chairperson: Leonardo Fernandez
- Secretary-General: Edgar B. Diares
- Founder: Leonardo Fernandez
- Founded: September 28, 2021; 5 years ago
- Headquarters: Mindanao
- Ideology: Philippine federalism; Filipino nationalism
- Colors: Blue, Green, and Red; Black (customary)
- Slogan: Una sa lahat ang Pilipino (The Filipino people is first of all)

Partido Pilipino sa Pagbabago (lit. 'Filipino Party for Change', PPP) is a political party in the Philippines. It was founded by Leonardo Fernandez to urge Sara Duterte, then mayor of Davao City, to run in the 2022 presidential election.

== History ==
Leonardo Fernandez, a businessman and political strategist, established Partido Pilipino sa Pagbabago in September 2021 for the potential presidential run of Sara Duterte, then mayor of Davao City, in the 2022 elections. He co-founded the party with Edgar B. Diares, a social development worker, as secretary general; Emmanuel C. Roldan, a journalist, as director of party institute; Romeo L. Lagahit, former commissioner of the Presidential Commission on the Urban Poor, as head of the national committee on education; and Nestor Abellanida, former councillor and administrator in Laak, Davao de Oro, as national treasurer. It aimed to be a national party accredited by COMELEC by February 2022. It also set Sara Duterte as its standard bearer.

On October 1, 2021, former Cebu 5th district Congressman Ace Durano joined the party. He was intended to match incumbent Cebu Governor Gwen Garcia. Durano selected Hilario Davide III as his running mate. Durano also became the PPP's regional president for Central Visayas.

Also, former Taguig–Pateros's 1st district Congressman Arnel Cerafica ran for Mayor of Taguig under PPP in 2022 elections to challenge the Cayetanos, with some of his slate members joined PPP.

But after Sara Duterte declined, PPP did not endorse any candidate for president. But later, with the help of Durano, some PPP members endorsed Duterte's running mate Bongbong Marcos, who went on to win the presidency with Duterte as the vice president.

== Ideology ==
PPP aims to push a Filipino-style federalism, adopting a more-inclusive government, with grassroots oriented initiative, aims to push a “Pro-Filipino block in Congress that will enact pro-Pilipino legislative measures and programs and will bring the spirit of the slogan alive.” PPP also aims to challenge the party system structure, as it was considered weak and as “exemplified by turncoatism”. The party also pushing national industrialization policy, a political party development policy that will end turncoatism.

PPP also aims to have key projects by establishment of a first integrated steel mill and smelting plant, and implementation of free-range chicken dispersal and marketing project with the Subanen tribe, both in Zamboanga Sibugay. They are also want to initiate a forest product and marketing project. pushing for the amendment to the Philippine Mining Act of 1995.

== Electoral performance ==
=== Presidential and vice presidential elections ===
Year	Presidential election				Vice presidential election			
Year	Candidate	Votes	Vote share	Result	Candidate	Votes	Vote share	Result
2022	None (Note: Party endorsed candidacy of Bongbong Marcos from PFP)			Bongbong Marcos (PFP)	None (Note: Party endorsed candidacy of Sara Duterte from Lakas)			Sara Duterte (Lakas)

=== Legislative elections ===
Congress of the Philippines
House of Representatives			Senate			
Year	Seats won	Result	Year	Seats won	Ticket	Result
2022	0 / 316	PDP Laban plurality	2022	0 / 12	Single party ticket	UniTeam win 6/12 seats
2025	Did not contest	Lakas plurality	2025	0 / 12	Single party ticket	Bagong Pilipinas win 6/12 seats
