= Bambang, Taguig =

Barangay in Taguig, Metro Manila, Philippines

Bambang
- Barangay
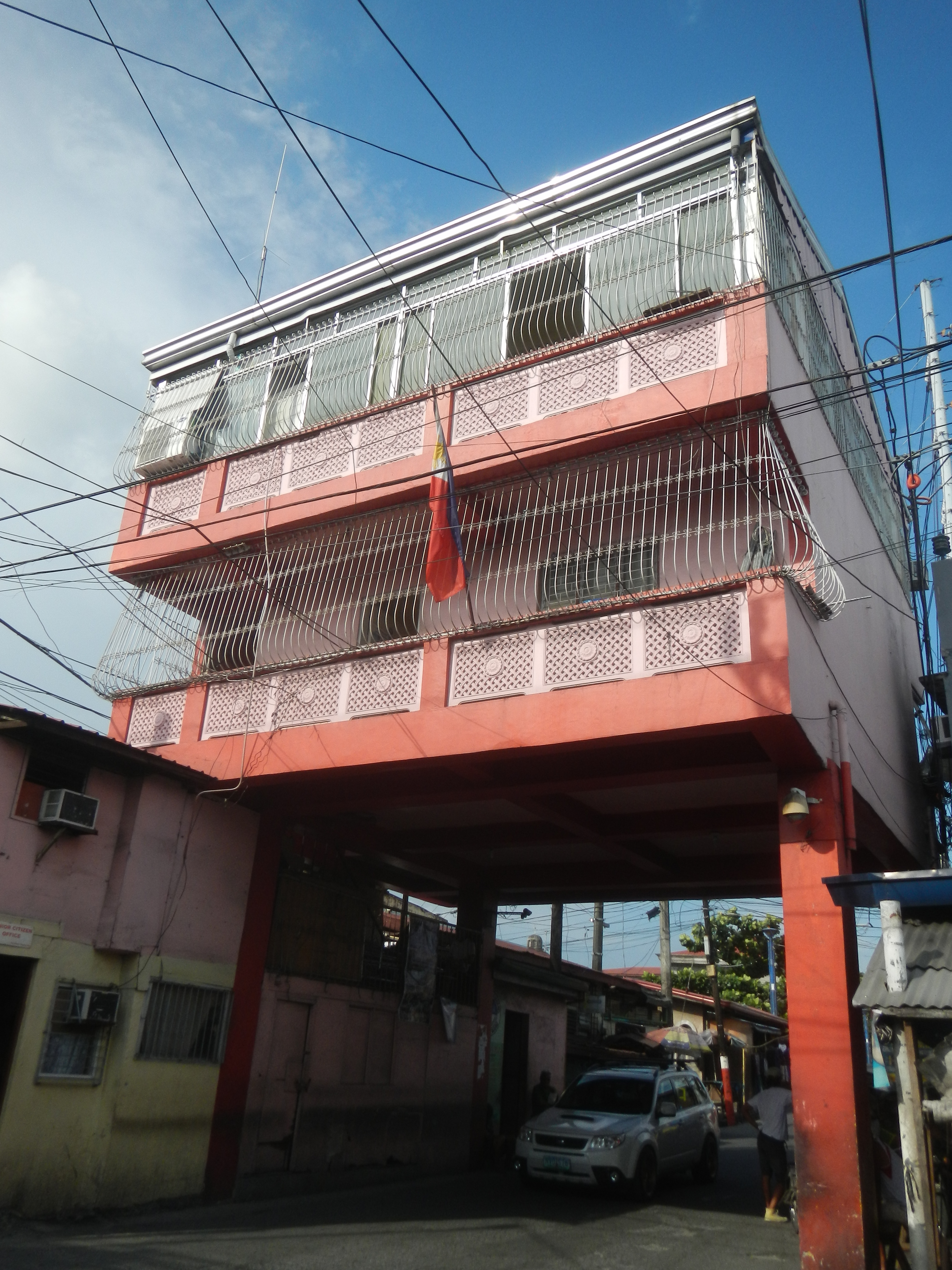
- Barangay hall

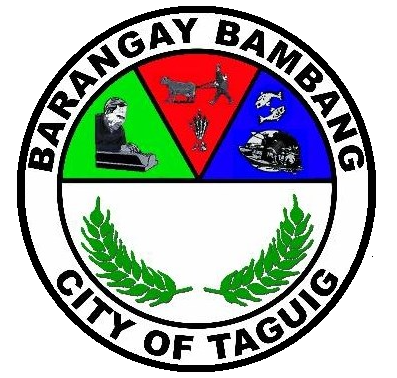
- Seal
- Interactive map of Bambang
- Location of Bambang within Metro Manila Location of Bambang within Luzon Location of Bambang within the Philippines
- Coordinates: 14°31′32.69″N 121°4′22.49″E
- Country: Philippines
- Region: Metro Manila
- City: Taguig
- District: District 1

Government
  - Type: Sangguniang Barangay
  - Barangay Captain: Ryan Esteban
  - Barangay Councilor: Danilo Manalo; Katherine Sta. Ana; Nenita Sinues; Ricardo Manalo, Jr.; Robin Bernardino; Francisco Esteban, Jr.; Jezzer Ignacio
  - Sangguniang Kabataan Chairperson: Adrian Sinues

Area
  - Total: 0.92 km^{2} (0.36 sq mi)

Population (2024)
  - Total: 15,749
- Time zone: UTC+08:00
- Area code: 02

Bambang, officially Barangay Bambang, is one of the 38 barangays of Taguig, Philippines. As of the 2020 census, the population was 13,949. Located near the Taguig River, it is one of the nine original barrios of the city when the latter was first established on April 25, 1587.

== Etymology ==
The name "Bambang" is derived from the word bambang (Tagalog pronunciation: [bɐmˈbaŋ]), meaning the banks of a river, due to the barangay's location near the shores of Taguig River where it was established by early Tagalogs. According to a legend, based on the barangay's profile posted on the official website of Taguig, the name is also derived from the word bamban (Tagalog pronunciation: [bɐmˈban̪]), meaning an egg with soft shell.

== History ==
During the Spanish rule of the Philippines, Bambang became one of the nine original barrios of Taguig, a pueblo (town) that was established as part of the province of Manila on April 25, 1587. When the country gained its independence from Spain on June 12, 1898, Isabelo Bautista was appointed as the village president (Filipino: pangulo ng nayon) of the barrio. In February 1945, during the Japanese occupation of the Philippines, soldiers of the Imperial Japanese Army destroyed the concrete bridge connecting the barrio to Tuktukan and the wooden bridge connecting to Santa Ana to stall the impending arrival of American troops as they began to retreat to Kay-Patag Hills (present-day location of Camp Bagong Diwa). That month, American soldiers who had recaptured Fort William McKinley traversed Pateros and arrived at Bambang. Bambang was later converted into a barangay by the virtue of Presidential Decree No. 557 signed by then-President Ferdinand Marcos on September 21, 1974.

== Geography ==
Bambang has a total land area of 0.92 square kilometers (92 hectares). It has six adjacent barangays: Tuktukan and Ususan on the north, San Miguel (previously part of Hagonoy) on the south, Santa Ana and Wawa on the east, and Pinagsama (previously part of Western Bicutan) on the west.

== Demographics ==
Historical population
Year	Population	±%
1903	380	—
1918	505	+32.9%
1960	1,427	+182.6%
1970^{a}	2,497	+75.0%
1975	2,722	+9.0%
1980	3,188	+17.1%
1985^{b}	—	—
1990	4,478	—
1995	4,623	+3.2%
2000	5,304	+14.7%
2007^{c}	6,199	+16.9%
2010	7,168	+15.6%
2015	10,010	+39.6%
2020	13,949	+39.4%
2024	15,749	+12.9%
^{a} The Philippines began to conduct census every five years starting 1970^{b} No census was held in 1985 due to a political and economic crisis^{c} Census was delayed from the original 2005 due to the reenacted budget that lasted until 2006; Source: United States Bureau of the Census (1903 census), Census Office of the Philippine Islands (1918 census), Bureau of the Census and Statistics (1960 census), National Census and Statistics Office (1970, 1975, 1980, and 1990 census), National Statistics Office (1995, 2000, 2007, and 2010 census), and Philippine Statistics Authority (2015 and 2020 census)

As of the 2020 Philippine census, there were 13,949 residents of Bambang.

== Government ==
Floro Hernandez was the barangay captain (Filipino: kapitan ng barangay) of Bambang in 2002, followed by Fernando Espiritu in 2007, Danilo Manalo in 2010, and Jaime Cruz in 2013. Cruz was reelected in 2018 and served until 2023. As of 2023, the incumbent barangay captain is Ryan Esteban, along with Manalo, Katherine Sta. Ana, Nenita Sinues, Ricardo Manalo Jr., Robin Bernardino, Francisco Esteban Jr., and Jezzer Ignacio as barangay councilors (Filipino: mga kagawad ng barangay), and Adrian Sinues as Sangguniang Kabataan chairperson.

== Landmarks ==
The churches that can be found in Bambang are San Juan de Sahagun Chapel of the Roman Catholic Church and a chapel of Iglesia ni Cristo.
