= Taguig–Pateros's 1st congressional district =

Legislative district of the Philippines

- Constituency for the House of Representatives of the Philippines
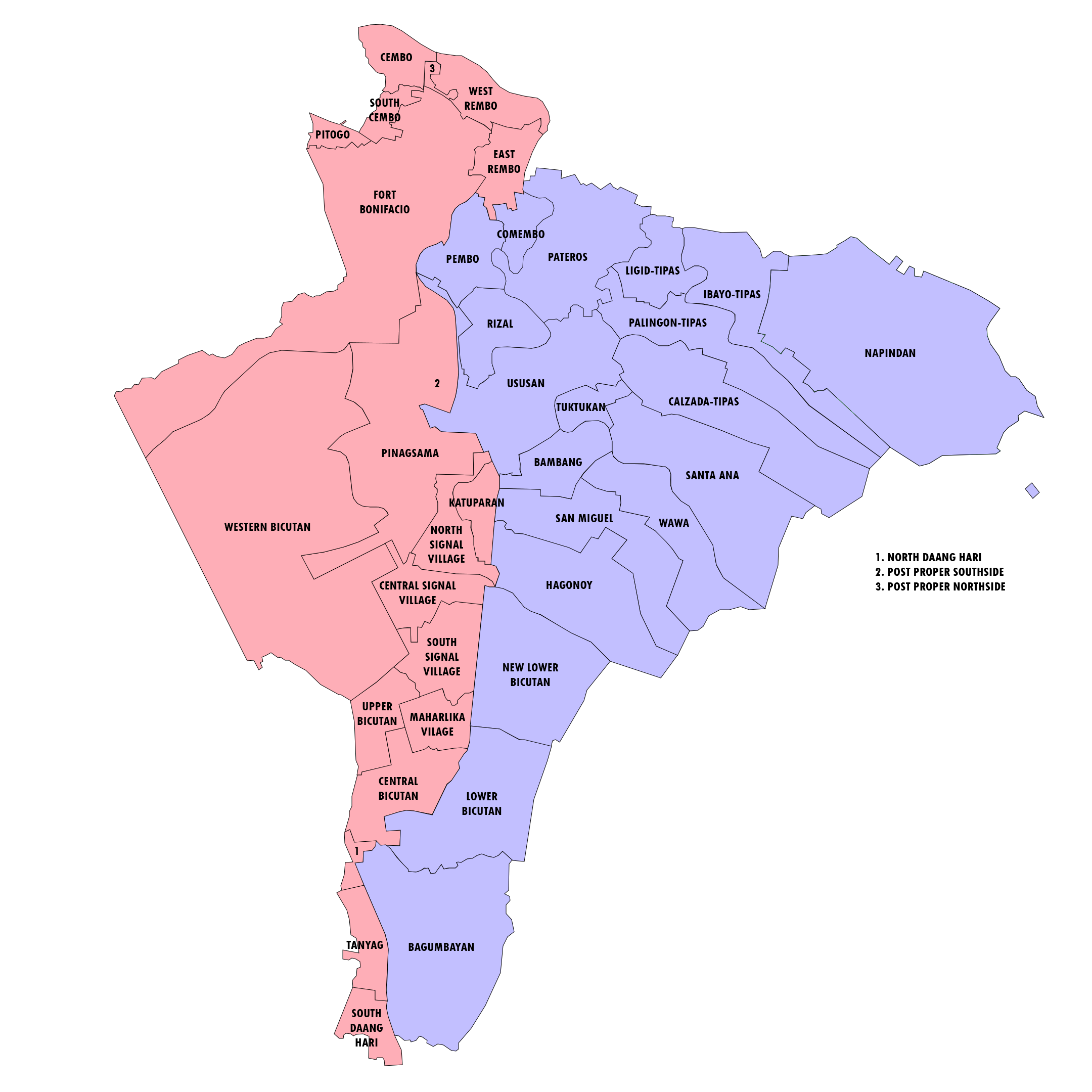
- Territory of the combined representation of Taguig–Pateros's 1st congressional district in Taguig and Pateros (in blue)
- City/Municipality: Pateros and Taguig
- Region: Metro Manila
- Population: 635,902 (2024)
- Electorate: 345,062 (2025)
- Major settlements: 28 barangays: Aguho; Bagumbayan; Bambang; Calzada; Comembo; Hagonoy; Ibayo-Tipas; Ligid-Tipas; Lower Bicutan; Magtanggol; Martires del 96; New Lower Bicutan; Napindan; Palingon; Pembo; Poblacion (Pateros); Rizal; San Miguel; San Pedro; San Roque; Santa Ana (Pateros); Santa Ana (Taguig); Santo Rosario–Kanluran; Santo Rosario–Silangan; Tabacalera; Tuktukan; Ususan; Wawa
- Area: 22.11 km^{2} (8.54 sq mi)

Current constituency
- Created: 2004
- Representative: Ading Cruz
- Political party: Nacionalista
- Congressional bloc: Majority

Taguig–Pateros's 1st congressional district is one of the two congressional districts of the Philippines in the combined independent local government units of Pateros and Taguig. It has been represented in the House of Representatives of the Philippines since 2007. The district was created in 2004 following a plebiscite to ratify Republic Act No. 8487 or the 1998 Taguig City Charter. It consists of the entire municipality of Pateros and the eastern Taguig barangays of Bagumbayan, Bambang, Calzada, Comembo, Hagonoy, Ibayo-Tipas, Ligid-Tipas, Lower Bicutan, New Lower Bicutan, Napindan, Palingon, Pembo, Rizal, San Miguel, Santa Ana, Tuktukan, Ususan and Wawa. The district is currently represented in the 20th Congress by Ading Cruz of the Nacionalista Party (NP).

== List of members representing the district ==
=== House of Representatives (1987–present) ===
Portrait	Member (Lifespan)	Term of office	Party	Legislature	Electoral history	Constituencies
District created December 8, 2004 from Taguig–Pateros's at-large district.
	Lani Cayetano (born 1981)	June 30, 2007 – June 30, 2010	Nacionalista	14th Congress	Elected in 2007.	2007–2008; Aguho, Bagumbayan, Bambang, Calzada, Hagonoy, Ibayo-Tipas, Ligid-Tipas, Lower Bicutan, Magtanggol, Martires del 96, Napindan, Palingon, Poblacion (Pateros), San Pedro, San Roque, Santa Ana (Pateros), Santa Ana (Taguig), Santo Rosario–Kanluran, Santo Rosario–Silangan, Tabacalera, Tuktukan, Ususan, Wawa
	Lani Cayetano (born 1981)	June 30, 2007 – June 30, 2010	Nacionalista	14th Congress	Elected in 2007.	2008–2024; Aguho, Bagumbayan, Bambang, Calzada, Hagonoy, Ibayo-Tipas, Ligid-Tipas, Lower Bicutan, Magtanggol, Martires del 96, New Lower Bicutan, Napindan, Palingon, Poblacion (Pateros), San Miguel, San Pedro, San Roque, Santa Ana (Pateros), Santa Ana (Taguig), Santo Rosario–Kanluran, Santo Rosario–Silangan, Tabacalera, Tuktukan, Ususan, Wawa
	Arnel Cerafica (born 1965)	June 30, 2010 – June 30, 2019	Liberal (KDT) (until 2018)	15th Congress	Elected in 2010.	2008–2024; Aguho, Bagumbayan, Bambang, Calzada, Hagonoy, Ibayo-Tipas, Ligid-Tipas, Lower Bicutan, Magtanggol, Martires del 96, New Lower Bicutan, Napindan, Palingon, Poblacion (Pateros), San Miguel, San Pedro, San Roque, Santa Ana (Pateros), Santa Ana (Taguig), Santo Rosario–Kanluran, Santo Rosario–Silangan, Tabacalera, Tuktukan, Ususan, Wawa
	Arnel Cerafica (born 1965)	June 30, 2010 – June 30, 2019	Liberal (KDT) (until 2018)	16th Congress	Re-elected in 2013.	2008–2024; Aguho, Bagumbayan, Bambang, Calzada, Hagonoy, Ibayo-Tipas, Ligid-Tipas, Lower Bicutan, Magtanggol, Martires del 96, New Lower Bicutan, Napindan, Palingon, Poblacion (Pateros), San Miguel, San Pedro, San Roque, Santa Ana (Pateros), Santa Ana (Taguig), Santo Rosario–Kanluran, Santo Rosario–Silangan, Tabacalera, Tuktukan, Ususan, Wawa
	Arnel Cerafica (born 1965)	June 30, 2010 – June 30, 2019	Liberal (KDT) (until 2018)	17th Congress	Re-elected in 2016.	2008–2024; Aguho, Bagumbayan, Bambang, Calzada, Hagonoy, Ibayo-Tipas, Ligid-Tipas, Lower Bicutan, Magtanggol, Martires del 96, New Lower Bicutan, Napindan, Palingon, Poblacion (Pateros), San Miguel, San Pedro, San Roque, Santa Ana (Pateros), Santa Ana (Taguig), Santo Rosario–Kanluran, Santo Rosario–Silangan, Tabacalera, Tuktukan, Ususan, Wawa
	Arnel Cerafica (born 1965)	June 30, 2010 – June 30, 2019	PDP–Laban (from 2018)	17th Congress	Re-elected in 2016.	2008–2024; Aguho, Bagumbayan, Bambang, Calzada, Hagonoy, Ibayo-Tipas, Ligid-Tipas, Lower Bicutan, Magtanggol, Martires del 96, New Lower Bicutan, Napindan, Palingon, Poblacion (Pateros), San Miguel, San Pedro, San Roque, Santa Ana (Pateros), Santa Ana (Taguig), Santo Rosario–Kanluran, Santo Rosario–Silangan, Tabacalera, Tuktukan, Ususan, Wawa
	Alan Peter Cayetano (born 1970)	June 30, 2019 – June 30, 2022	Nacionalista (until 2021)	18th Congress	Elected in 2019.	2008–2024; Aguho, Bagumbayan, Bambang, Calzada, Hagonoy, Ibayo-Tipas, Ligid-Tipas, Lower Bicutan, Magtanggol, Martires del 96, New Lower Bicutan, Napindan, Palingon, Poblacion (Pateros), San Miguel, San Pedro, San Roque, Santa Ana (Pateros), Santa Ana (Taguig), Santo Rosario–Kanluran, Santo Rosario–Silangan, Tabacalera, Tuktukan, Ususan, Wawa
	Alan Peter Cayetano (born 1970)	June 30, 2019 – June 30, 2022	Independent (from 2021)	18th Congress	Elected in 2019.	2008–2024; Aguho, Bagumbayan, Bambang, Calzada, Hagonoy, Ibayo-Tipas, Ligid-Tipas, Lower Bicutan, Magtanggol, Martires del 96, New Lower Bicutan, Napindan, Palingon, Poblacion (Pateros), San Miguel, San Pedro, San Roque, Santa Ana (Pateros), Santa Ana (Taguig), Santo Rosario–Kanluran, Santo Rosario–Silangan, Tabacalera, Tuktukan, Ususan, Wawa
	Ading Cruz (born 1959)	June 30, 2022 – present	Nacionalista	19th Congress	Elected in 2022.	2008–2024; Aguho, Bagumbayan, Bambang, Calzada, Hagonoy, Ibayo-Tipas, Ligid-Tipas, Lower Bicutan, Magtanggol, Martires del 96, New Lower Bicutan, Napindan, Palingon, Poblacion (Pateros), San Miguel, San Pedro, San Roque, Santa Ana (Pateros), Santa Ana (Taguig), Santo Rosario–Kanluran, Santo Rosario–Silangan, Tabacalera, Tuktukan, Ususan, Wawa
	Ading Cruz (born 1959)	June 30, 2022 – present	Nacionalista	19th Congress	Elected in 2022.	2024–present Aguho, Bagumbayan, Bambang, Calzada, Comembo, Hagonoy, Ibayo-Tipas, Ligid-Tipas, Lower Bicutan, Magtanggol, Martires del 96, Napindan, Palingon, Pembo, Poblacion (Pateros), Rizal, San Pedro, San Roque, Santa Ana (Pateros), Santa Ana (Taguig), Santo Rosario–Kanluran, Santo Rosario–Silangan, Tabacalera, Tuktukan, Ususan, Wawa
	Ading Cruz (born 1959)	June 30, 2022 – present	Nacionalista	20th Congress	Re-elected in 2025.	2024–present Aguho, Bagumbayan, Bambang, Calzada, Comembo, Hagonoy, Ibayo-Tipas, Ligid-Tipas, Lower Bicutan, Magtanggol, Martires del 96, Napindan, Palingon, Pembo, Poblacion (Pateros), Rizal, San Pedro, San Roque, Santa Ana (Pateros), Santa Ana (Taguig), Santo Rosario–Kanluran, Santo Rosario–Silangan, Tabacalera, Tuktukan, Ususan, Wawa

== Election results ==
=== 2010 ===
2010 Philippine House of Representatives election in Taguig and Pateros
Party	Candidate	Votes	%
Liberal	Arnel Cerafica	65,264	60.19
Nacionalista	Rene Carl Cayetano	42,558	39.25
Independent	Luis Cruz Jr.	349	0.32
Independent	Joselito Gabriel	256	0.24
Total votes		108,427	100.00
Liberal gain from Nacionalista			

=== 2013 ===
2013 Philippine House of Representatives election in Taguig and Pateros
Party	Candidate	Votes	%
Liberal	Arnel Cerafica (incumbent)	37,556	67.98
Nacionalista	Gigi Valenzuela de Mesa	17,686	32.02
Valid ballots		55,242	93.86
Invalid or blank votes		3,614	6.14
Total votes		58,856	100.00
Liberal hold			

=== 2016 ===
2016 Philippine House of Representatives election in Taguig and Pateros
Party	Candidate	Votes	%
Liberal	Arnel Cerafica (incumbent)	102,954	90.31
PBM	Gloria Cabrera	11,051	9.69
Total votes		114,005	100.00
Liberal hold			

=== 2019 ===
2019 Philippine House of Representatives election in Taguig and Pateros
Party	Candidate	Votes	%
Nacionalista	Alan Peter Cayetano	91,993	58.75
PDP–Laban	Allan Cerafica	63,641	40.64
Independent	Gloria Cabrera	829	0.53
PFP	Zaman Rajahmuda	132	0.08
Total votes		156,595	100.00
Nacionalista gain from PDP–Laban			

=== 2022 ===
2022 Philippine House of Representatives election in Taguig and Pateros
Party	Candidate	Votes	%
Nacionalista	Ading Cruz	99,059	54.51
PPP	Allan Cerafica	82,673	45.49
Total votes		181,732	100.00
Nacionalista gain from Independent			

=== 2025 ===
2025 Philippine House of Representatives election in Taguig and Pateros
Party	Candidate	Votes	%
Nacionalista	Ading Cruz (incumbent)	118,205	46.07
NPC	Lino Cayetano	79,064	30.82
PFP	Allan Cerafica	54,971	21.43
Independent	Peter dela Cruz	2,692	1.05
Independent	Ricardo Opoc	1,637	0.64
Total votes		256,569	100.00
Nacionalista hold			

== See also ==
- Legislative districts of Taguig
- Legislative districts of Pateros–Taguig

House of Representatives of the Philippines
Preceded by Pampanga's 2nd congressional district	Home district of the speaker of the House of Representatives; July 22, 2019 – October 12, 2020	Succeeded by Marinduque's at-large congressional district
