= Ususan =

Barangay in Taguig, Metro Manila, Philippines

- Barangay
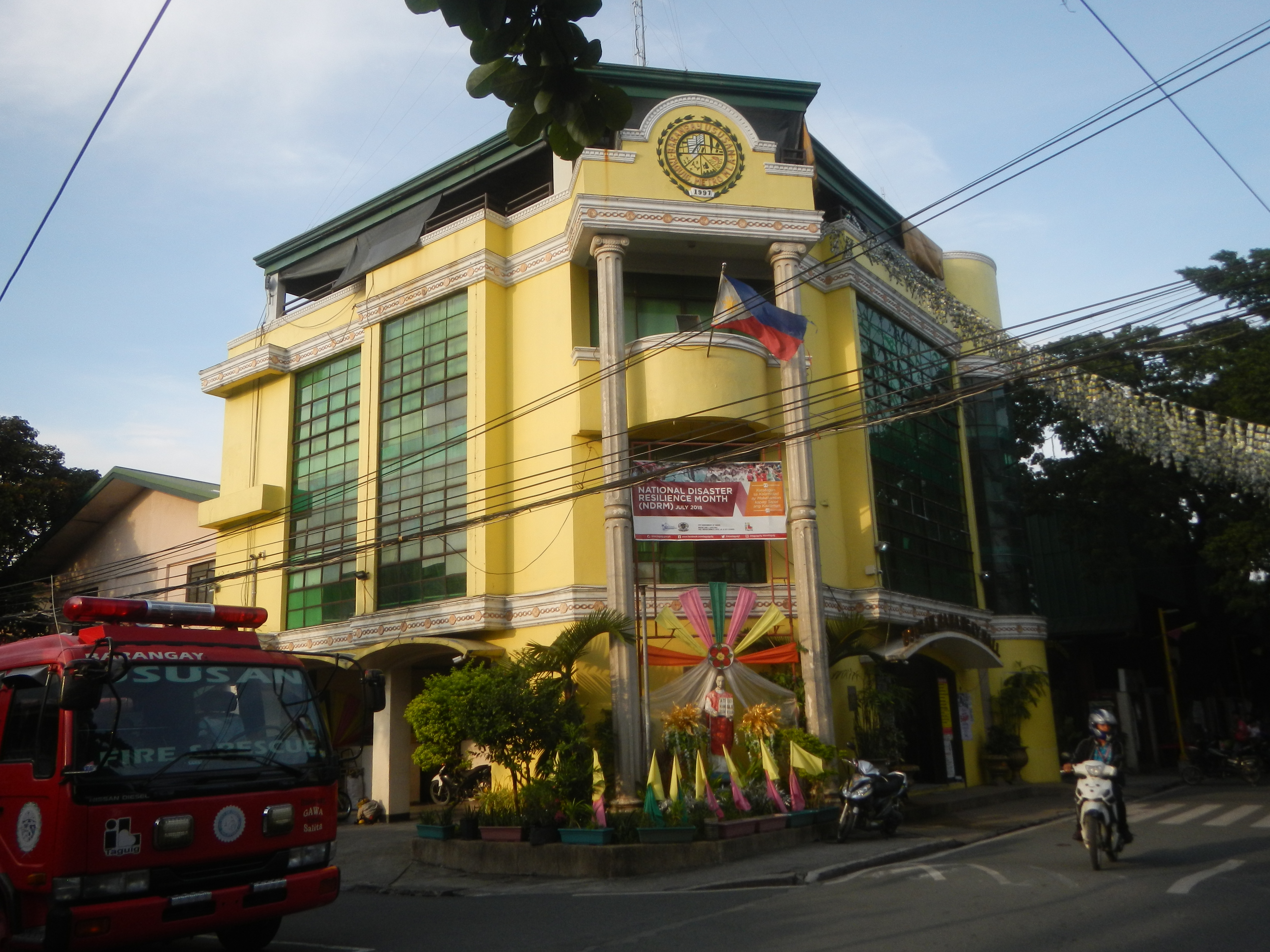
- Barangay hall

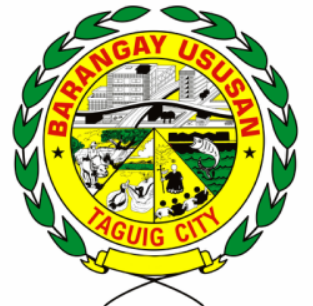
- Seal

- Location within Metro Manila
- Coordinates: 14°32′3.588″N 121°4′3.4284″E
- Country: Philippines
- Region: National Capital Region
- City: Taguig
- District: Part of the 1st district of Taguig

Government
  - Type: Barangay
  - Punong Barangay: Marilyn Marcelino
  - Barangay Councilor: Jim Albert Flores; Rachelle Santos; Gabrielle Ann Marcelino; Joselito Costes; Romell Marcelino; Manuel Carlos; Raul Teodones
  - Sangguniang Kabataan Chairperson: Mary Avigail Felipe

Population (2024)
  - Total: 54,814
- Time zone: UTC+8 (PST)
- Postal Code: 1639
- Area code: 02
- Patron saint: Ignatius of Loyola
- Website: barangay-ususan.weebly.com

Ususan is one of the 38 barangays of Taguig, Philippines. As of 2024, it has a population of 54,814 people.

== Etymology ==
Ususan is Tagalog as the barangay is shaped like the letter “U” formed by the Taguig River. Historically, wood from the forest of Ususan and areas now part of Fort Bonifacio were transported along the riverbanks, earning it the moniker "Us-usan ng Kahoy" or "slide."

The old name of Ususan was Maysapang.

== History ==
Ususan is one of the original villages or barrios of Taguig when it was established as a pueblo (town) under the Provincia de Tondo in 1587. During the Spanish government reign in Taguig, men from this barrio were forced to be part of the Polo y Servico.

Also under the jurisdiction of Barangay Ususan were the National Battle Monuments Cemetery, also known as the Manila American Cemetery. Half of the Garden of Memories Memorial Park is also within the territory of the barangay.

Ususan is made up of four areas, namely: Subaan, Ibaba or Lungos, Kabilang Banda (Ibayo) and Pampangin.

As a barangay of Taguig, Ususan also claimed the northern part of Fort Andres Bonifacio, which particularly consists of the Bonifacio Global City and Manila American Cemetery, until these were ceded to Barangay Fort Bonifacio, which was created in 2008.

== Geography ==
Ususan is bounded on the north by Pembo and Rizal mostly through the Pateros River and Pinagsama Creek, northeast by Martires Del '96 and San Roque in Pateros and Palingon Tipas in Taguig, on the east by Calzada, to the southeast by Tuktukan through the Taguig River, to the south by Bambang through the Sapang Ususan Creek, and on the west by Pinagsama through the Circumferential Road 5.

The exclaves of LogCom is bounded by Pembo on the northeast and Circumferential Road 5 on the southwest. These exclaves once overlapped barangays Post Proper Southside, Pembo, and Rizal, all formerly under Makati.
