= Tuktukan =

Barangay in Taguig, Metro Manila, Philippines

- Barangay
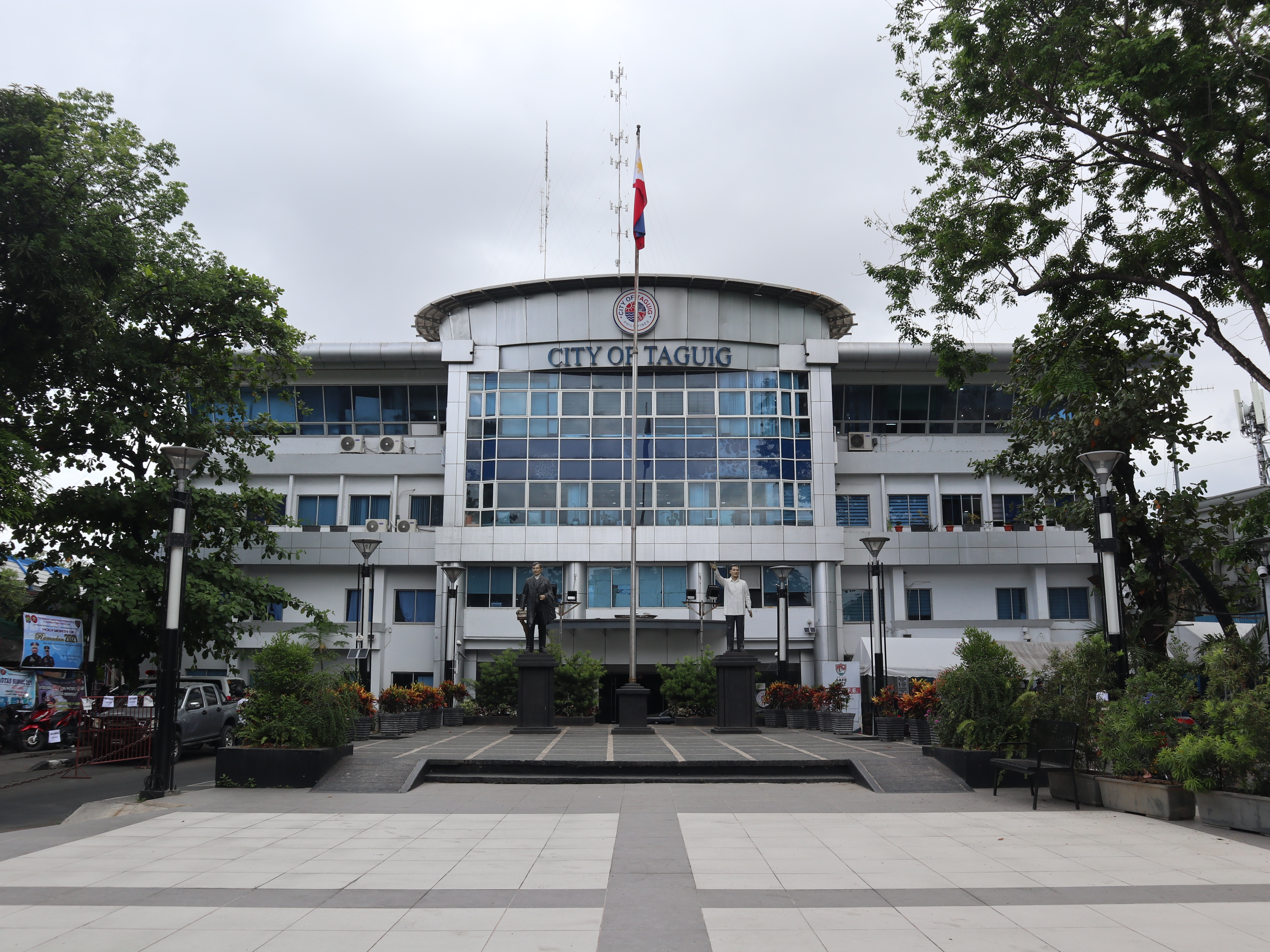
- Taguig City Hall, located in the barangay

- Location within Metro Manila
- Coordinates: 14°31′40.95″N 121°4′18.40″E
- Country: Philippines
- Region: National Capital Region
- City: Taguig
- District: 1st Legislative district of Taguig

Government
  - Type: Barangay
  - Punong Barangay: Suranie Ulanday
  - Barangay Councilor: Nenita U. Aquino; John Carlo C. De Guzman; Manuela E. Frisnedy; Kim Edrianne S. Cruz; Romeo B. Flores; Ladylove Idjao; Juan Carlo L. Espiritu
  - Sangguniang Kabataan Chairperson: Marc Joseph Dela Cruz

Area
  - Total: 0.31 km^{2} (0.12 sq mi)

Population (2024)
  - Total: 12,414
  - Density: 40,000/km^{2} (100,000/sq mi)
- Time zone: UTC+8 (PST)
- ZIP code: 1637
- Area code: 02
- Website: https://www.facebook.com/barangay.tuktukan.50

Tuktukan is one of the 38 barangays of Taguig, Philippines. Since 1958, it is the center of the city (poblacion) as it is the location of the third Taguig City Hall.

== Etymology ==
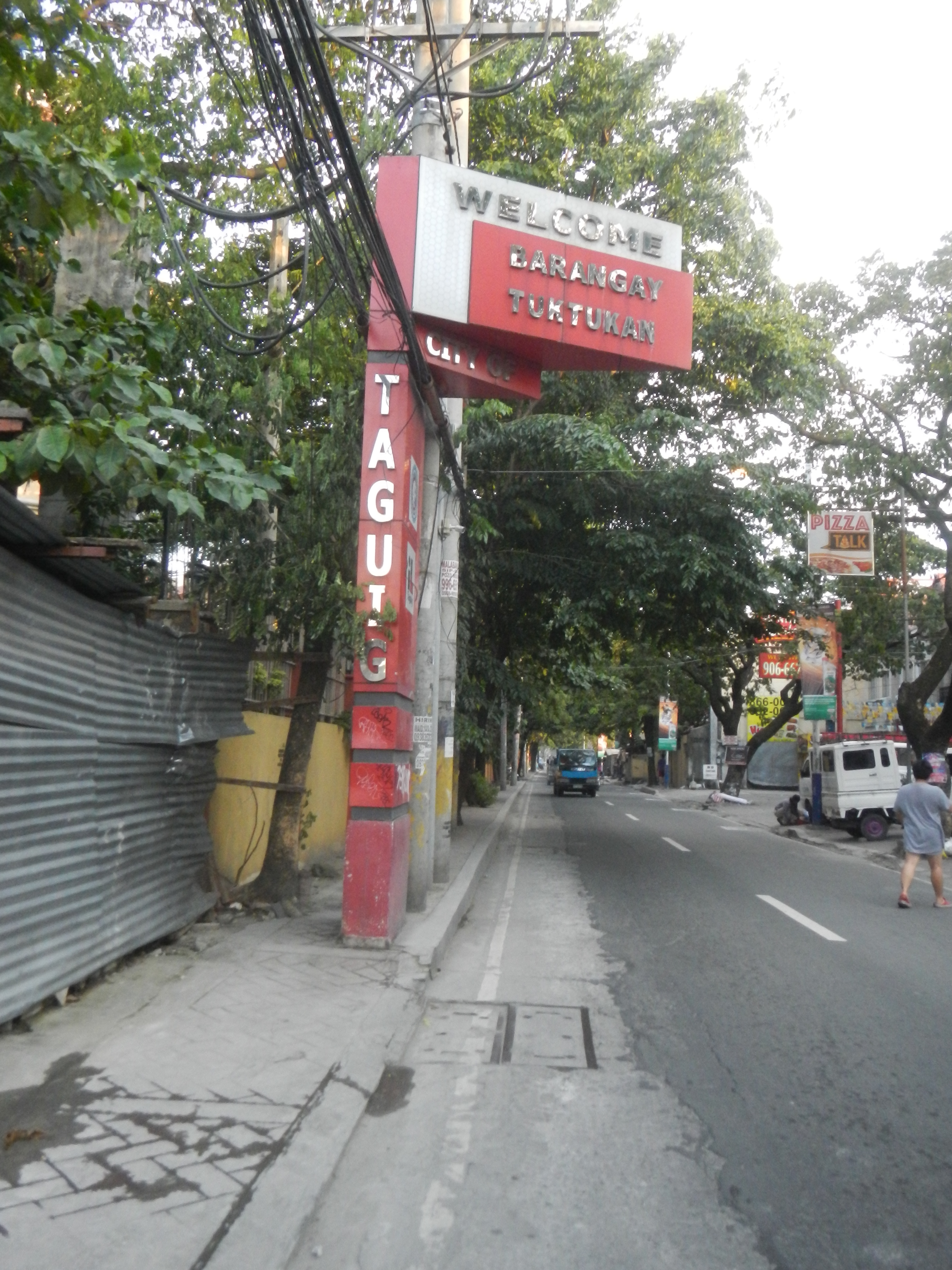
Tuktukan boundary marker sign on Bagong Calzada

The word Tuktukan was coined by the Spanish as "Toctocan", which in Tagalog means an object to tap or to hit, referring to an instrument typically a plank of wood or rock utilized by women for laundry purposes. This practice was observed by the friars upon their arrival at the placet.

ḢḢ== History == On August 1, 1958, the seat of government of Taguig was transferred from Santa Ana to Tuktukan, when President Carlos P. Garcia signed Executive Order No. 311, s. 1958. A new municipal hall of Taguig was constructed in 1959 and has been the seat of the Taguig government until 2025.

Based on the 1980 census, Tuktukan had a population of 5,777. The total land area of the barangay is 31 hectares (77 acres).

== Geography ==
Tuktukan is bounded on the north by Ususan, to the east by Calzada Tipas, to the south by Santa Ana, and on the west by the Taguig River.

== Landmarks ==
Tuktukan is the location of the Taguig City Hall, constructed in 1959 and the seat of city government. Shopping centers such as Puregold Taguig and Vista Mall Taguig, partially situated there, serve the community.
