= Taguig River =

Taguig River Taguig-Pateros River
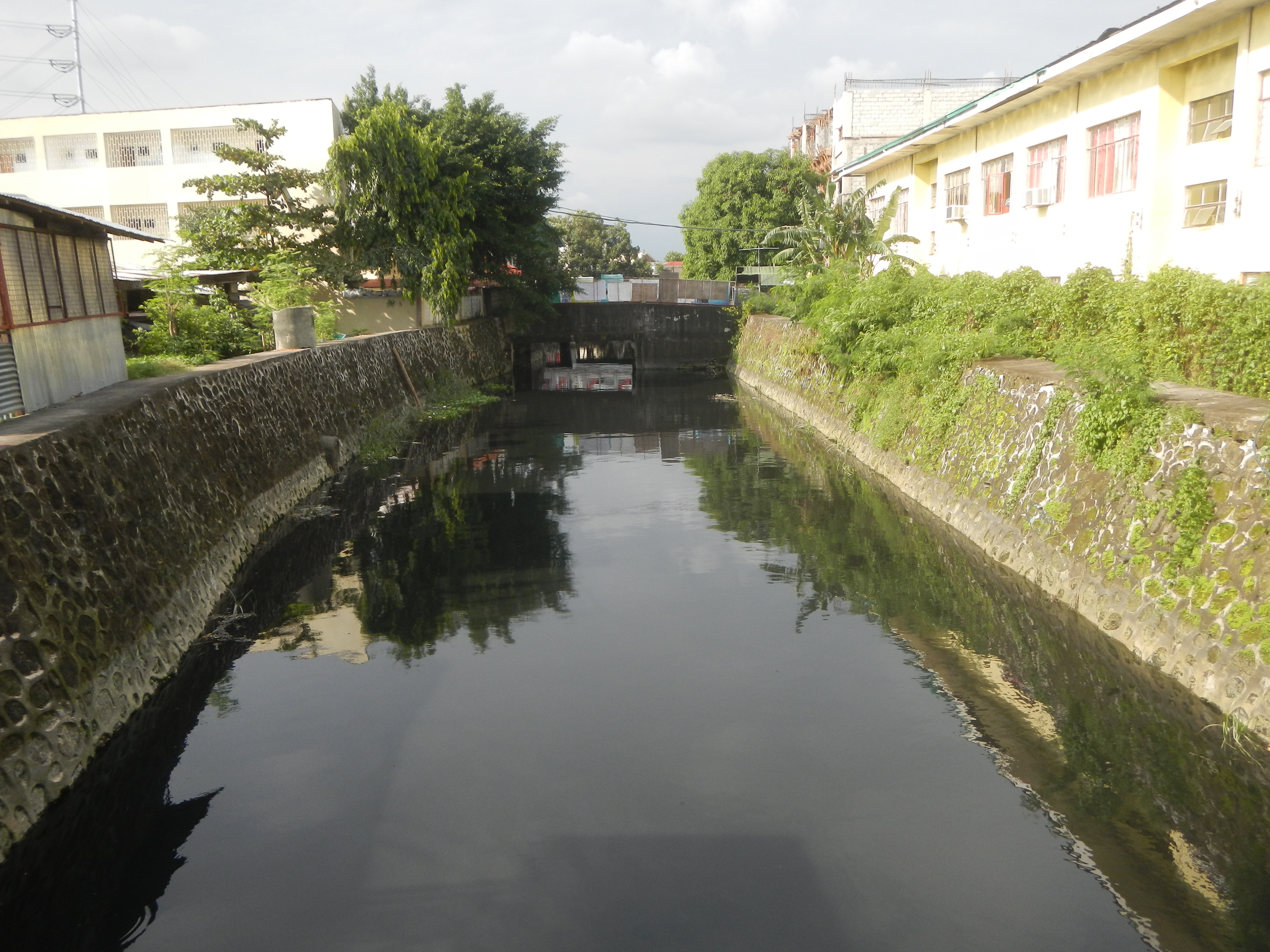
- The river in 2018

- Taguig River mouth Taguig River (Philippines)

Location
- Country: Philippines
- Region: National Capital Region

Physical characteristics
- Mouth
  - coordinates: 14°33′26″N 121°03′59″E

Basin features
- Progression: Taguig–Pateros–Pasig

The Taguig River (Tagalog: Ilog ng Taguig), also known as the Taguig-Pateros River, is a river that serves as the easternmost border of the City of Taguig, with Pateros and Pasig. It is a tributary of the Pasig River.

== See also ==
- List of rivers and esteros in Manila
- Taguig
