= Santa Ana, Taguig =

Barangay in Taguig, Metro Manila, Philippines

Santa Ana
- Barangay
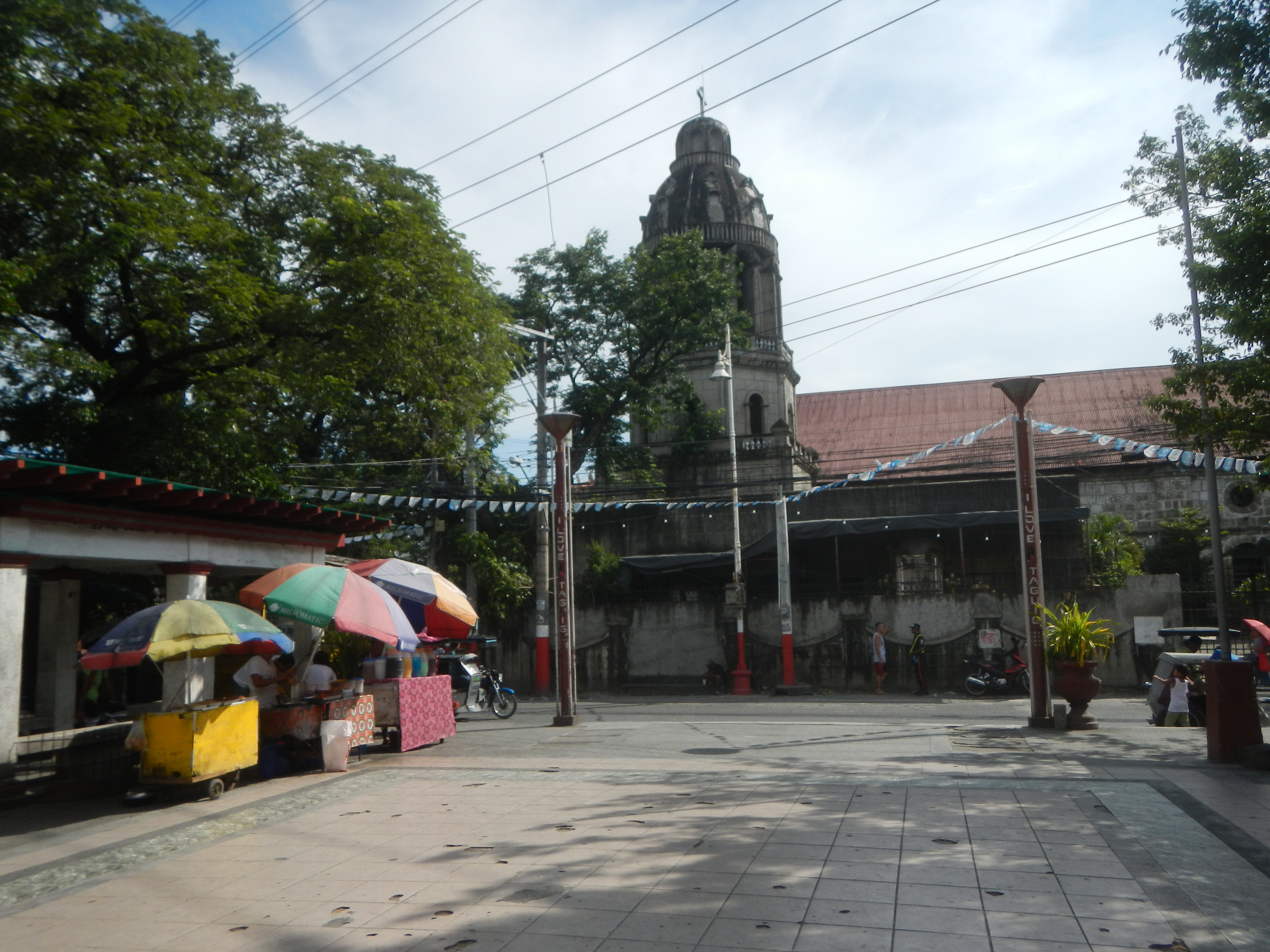
- Santa Ana Church as seen from Plaza Quezon

- Seal

- Location within Metro Manila
- Coordinates: 14°31′39.76″N 121°4′35.85″E
- Country: Philippines
- Region: National Capital Region
- City: Taguig
- District: 1st Legislative district of Taguig
- Established: April 04, 1587
- Named for: Saint Anne

Government
  - Type: Barangay
  - Punong Barangay: Roberto M. Flogen
  - Barangay Councilor: Ronnie D. Paloma; Pepito M. Rodriguez; Conrado A. Aquino Jr.; Elsa P. Macalinao; Mark Vincent F. Abella; Hardy E. Lorenzo; Agapito S. Herrera
  - Sangguniang Kabataan Chairperson: Joanna Mae M. Pagkalinawan

Area
  - Total: 0.22 km^{2} (0.085 sq mi)

Population (2024)
  - Total: 24,174
  - Density: 110,000/km^{2} (280,000/sq mi)
- Time zone: UTC+8 (PST)
- Postal Code: 1637
- Area code: 02
- Website: https://www.facebook.com/brgystaanataguig

Santa Ana is one of the 38 barangays of Taguig, Philippines. It is one of the nine original barrios of Taguig. It is named after Saint Anne, who is the patroness of the barangay.

== History ==
Santa Ana is the original municipal center or Poblacion of Taguig from its establishment in 1587, during the Spanish colonization of the Philippines. It had a total land area of 142 hectares (350 acres).

== Landmarks ==
The Minor Basilica and Archdiocesan Shrine of St. Anne is a Roman Catholic church located in the barangay. Built in 1587, it is situated next to the Taguig River and across Plaza Quezon, where the statue of Manuel L. Quezon was erected when he was still serving as the nation's President. The Taguig Integrated School is also located in the barangay. Its Gabaldon Building, which has remained standing since it was constructed from 1917 to 1928 and currently serves as the school's museum.

== Geography ==
Santa Ana is bounded to the north by Tuktukan, to the east by Calzada Tipas, to the south by Laguna de Bay, and to the west by the Taguig River.
