= Calzada, Taguig =

Barangay in Taguig, Metro Manila, Philippines

Calzada Calzada-Tipas
- Barangay
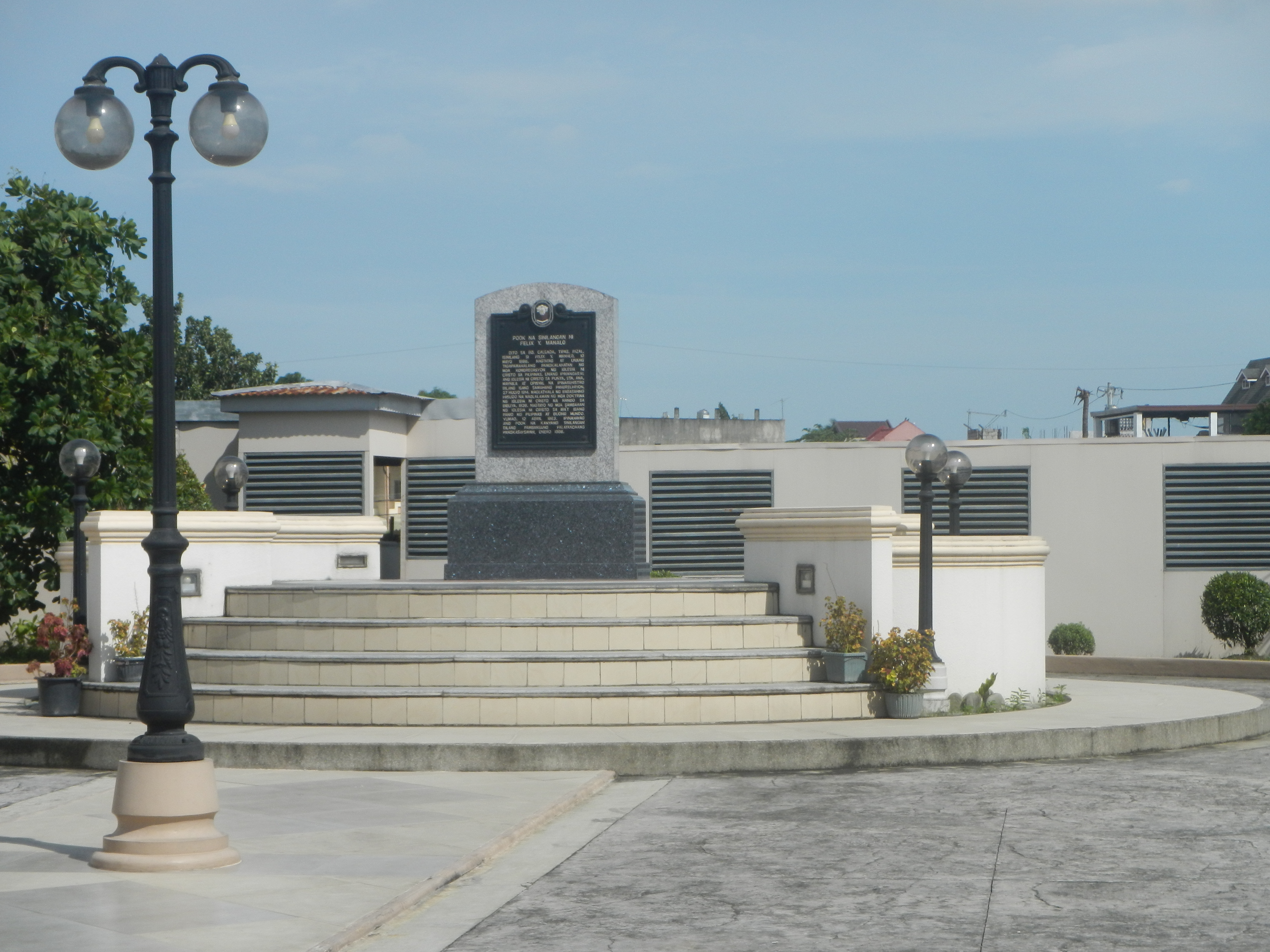
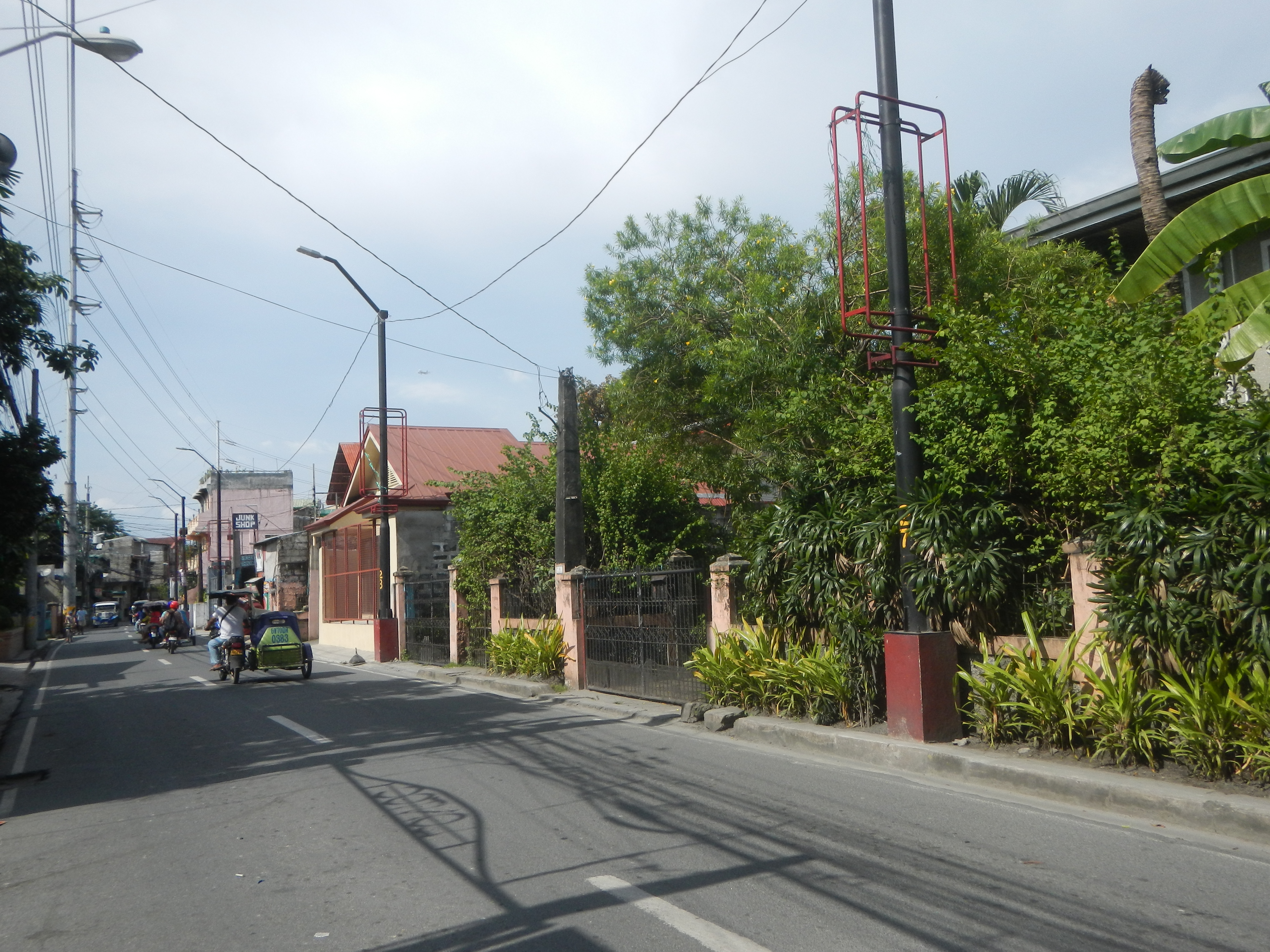

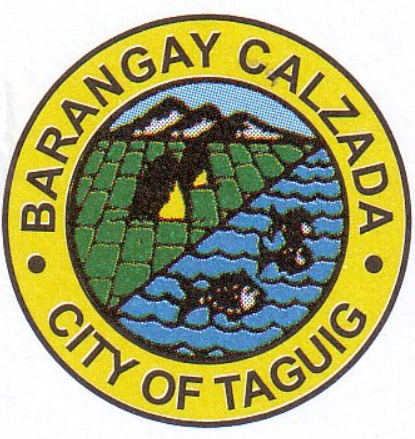
- Seal Wordmark

- Location within Metro Manila
- Coordinates: 14°31′39.76″N 121°4′35.85″E
- Country: Philippines
- Region: National Capital Region
- City: Taguig
- District: 1st Legislative district of Taguig
- Calzada Tipas: July 15, 1971

Government
  - Type: Barangay
  - Punong Barangay: Rommel "Ome" Tanyag
  - Barangay Councilor: Ralph Allan Geronimo; Davis Landrito; Virgilio Maglipon; Vicente Magdaraog; Bernardo Geromo; Luisa Encanto; Joseph Anthony Carlos
  - Sangguniang Kabataan Chairperson: Jazzel Louise Sanga

Population (2024)
  - Total: 32,160
- Time zone: UTC+8 (PST)
- Postal Code: 1637
- Area code: 02
- Website: https://www.facebook.com/BarangayCalzadaTipas/

Calzada, also known as Calzada-Tipas, is one of the 38 barangays of Taguig, Philippines.

== Etymology ==
The barangay's original name is Calzada Tipas. The first part of the barangay's name, Calzada, comes from Spanish word for "road", symbolizing the thoroughfare that connects Santa Ana, the old town center of Taguig with the neighboring towns of Pateros and Pasig. On the other hand, the second part, Tipas, comes from Tagalog words tinagpas or tiga-gapas, which means "to cut" or "to break", representing the traditional practice of farmers cutting through rice crops during harvest.

== History ==
Through Municipal Resolution No. 51 of the Taguig Municipal Council on July 15, 1971, the old Nayon of Tipas was divided into 4 Barrios, namely: Calzada Tipas, Palingon Tipas, Ligid Tipas, and Ibayo Tipas. It was converted into barangay in 1974, by virtue of Presidential Decree No. 557.

== Geography ==
Calzada is bounded on the north by Palingon Tipas, on the east by Laguna de Bay, on the south by Santa Ana, and on the west by Tuktukan.

== Notable people ==
- Felix Manalo (1886 – 1963), founder and first executive minister of Iglesia ni Cristo
