= Central Signal Village =

Barangay in Taguig, Metro Manila, Philippines

Central Signal Village Central Signal
- Barangay
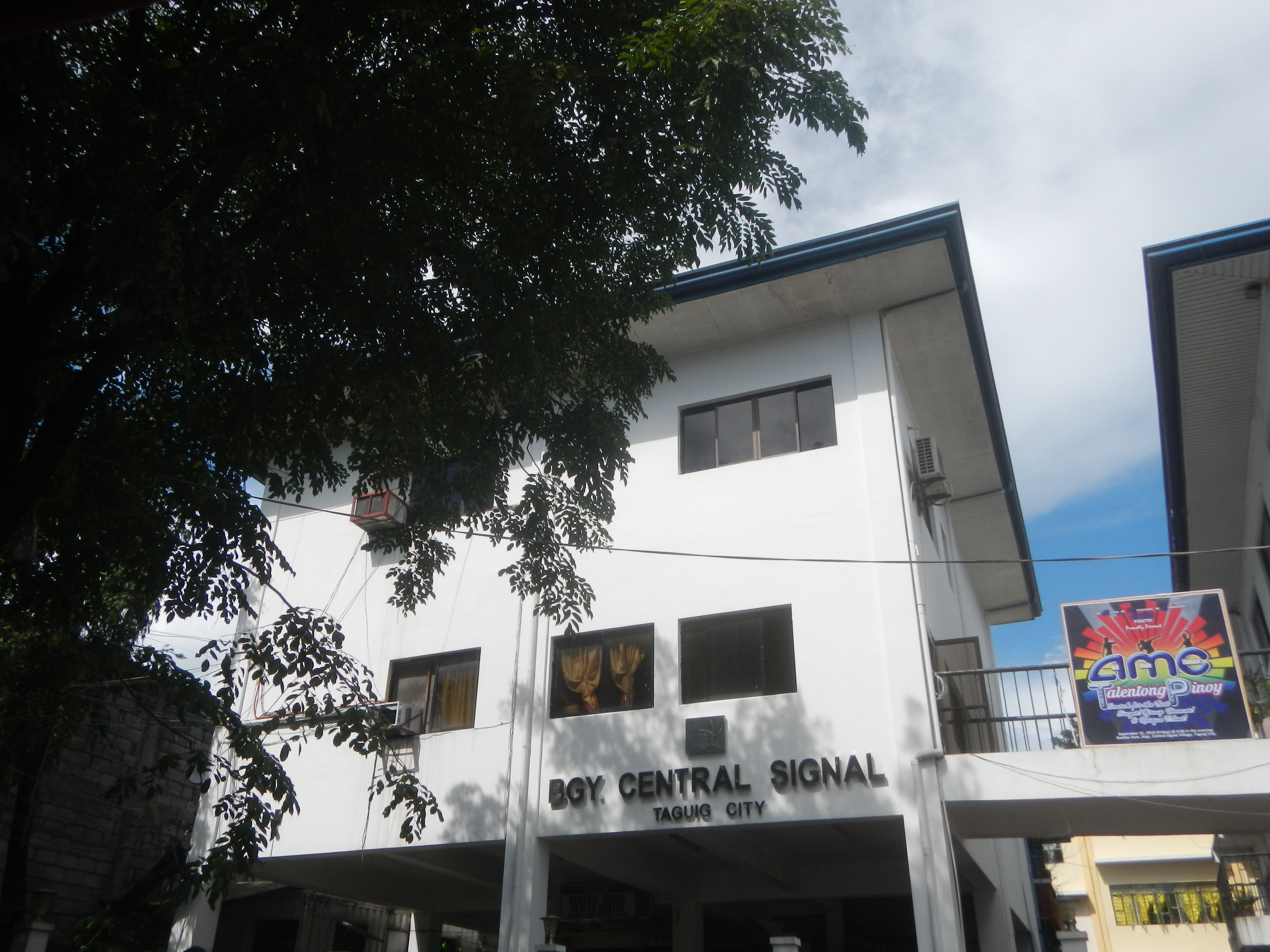
- Barangay hall
- Interactive map of Central Signal Village
- Location of Central Signal Village within Metro Manila Location of Central Signal Village within Luzon Location of Central Signal Village within the Philippines
- Coordinates: 14°30′41.27″N 121°3′22.59″E
- Country: Philippines
- Region: Metro Manila
- City: Taguig
- District: District 2
- Established (as EM's Signal Barrio): January 25, 1965
- Created (as Signal Village): 1972
- Renamed (as Central Signal Village): December 28, 2008

Government
  - Type: Sangguniang Barangay
  - Barangay Captain: Henry Dueñas III
  - Barangay Councilor: Manuel Binag, Jr.; Dado Dogwe; Rosejean Zabala; Paul Nicole Llanto; Arthur Tan; Principe De Vilier; Andre Polo
  - Sangguniang Kabataan Chairperson: Ma. Yvone German

Area
  - Total: 77 ha (190 acres)

Population (2024)
  - Total: 47,664
- Time zone: UTC+08:00
- Area code: 02
- Website: brgycentralsignal.ph

Central Signal Village, officially Barangay Central Signal Village and simply known as Central Signal, is one of the 38 barangays of Taguig, Philippines. As of the 2020 census, the population was 44,126. The barangay was previously known as EM's Signal Barrio on January 25, 1965, and was created as Signal Village in 1972, before it was renamed on December 28, 2008.

== History ==
On June 8, 1964, around 18 families of the members of Signal Corps of the Armed Forces of the Philippines (AFP) were relocated from Diliman, Quezon City to an area in Fort Bonifacio, with the assistance of the Signal Service Battalion of the Philippine Army. That area later became known as Enlisted Men's (EM's) Signal Barrio, incorporating the name of the corps. It was formally established on January 25, 1965, when it was reinforced by then-AFP Chief of Staff General Alfredo Santos. An association composed mostly of the wives of the corps personnel, led by Clarita Manalili, petitioned to then-President Diosdado Macapagal to separate EM's Signal Barrio from Fort Bonifacio and award it to the residents. Macapagal then signed Proclamation No. 462 on September 29, 1965, which excluded the area from the military camp and called it as AFP EM's Village; the proclamation took effect but was not implemented.

Bicutan, a barrio where Fort Bonifacio was located, was divided into four barrios in 1972, in which one of them became known as Signal Village. It was converted into a barangay by the virtue of Presidential Decree No. 557 signed by then-President Ferdinand Marcos on September 21, 1974. Its parcels of land were not yet distributed to the residents because they were still being reserved for the military camp. On January 7, 1986, Marcos signed Proclamation No. 2476 to exclude the barangay from military reservation. The Bureau of Lands began to distribute the parcels of land among the residents but was interrupted in February 1986 due to the EDSA revolution. On October 16, 1987, then-President Corazon Aquino signed Proclamation No. 172 reaffirming the exclusion of the barangay from reservation.

In 2008, the Sangguniang Panlungsod of Taguig passed City Ordinance No. 61 to create a new barangay that would be known as Central Signal Village, which was also the new name of Signal Village. A plebiscite to ratify the ordinance was conducted by the Commission on Elections on December 18, 2008. The city's board of canvassers proclaimed it as valid on December 28, 2008. Signal Village was also divided to create new barangays, namely Katuparan, North Signal Village, and South Signal Village.

== Geography ==
Central Signal Village has a total land area of 77 hectares (770,000 square meters). Before 2008, when it was still known as Signal Village, the barangay had a total land area of 1,642,869 square meters (164 hectares). It is currently bordered to the north by Sampaloc Street and M.R.T. Avenue (formerly Cuasay Street), to the south by Governor Rodriguez Avenue, Luzon Avenue, Espino Street, Callejon Balleser Street, and Calle Cabasaan, to the east by NAPOCOR High Tension Power Line, to the northwest by Veterans Compound, and to the southwest by F.T.I. Compound. It has seven adjacent barangays: North Signal Village and Pinagsama on the north, Hagonoy and New Lower Bicutan on the east, South Signal Village and Lower Bicutan on the south, and Western Bicutan on the west.

The barangay is composed of 60% hilly areas and 40% flat lands. It is traversed by the West Valley Fault of the Marikina Valley Fault System, making the barangay prone to an earthquake that could generate of up to 7.2 magnitude on the Richter scale.

== Demographics ==
Historical population
Year	Population	±%
1975^{a}	3,050	—
1980	13,543	+344.0%
1985^{b}	—	—
1990	45,213	—
1995	70,296	+55.5%
2000	82,765	+17.7%
2007^{c}	107,906	+30.4%
2010^{d}	35,752	−66.9%
2015	39,674	+11.0%
2020	44,126	+11.2%
2024	47,664	+8.0%
^{a} As Barangay Signal Village^{b} No census was held in 1985 due to a political and economic crisis^{c} Census was delayed from the original 2005 due to the reenacted budget that lasted until 2006^{d} As Barangay Central Signal Village; Source: National Census and Statistics Office (1975, 1980, and 1990 census), National Statistics Office (1995, 2000, 2007, and 2010 census) and Philippine Statistics Authority (2015 and 2020 census)

As of the 2020 Philippine census, there were 44,126 residents of Central Signal Village.

== Education ==
Central Signal Village has two public schools: EM's Signal Village Elementary School and Signal Village National High School.
