= South Signal Village =

Barangay in Taguig, Metro Manila, Philippines

South Signal Village South Signal
- Barangay
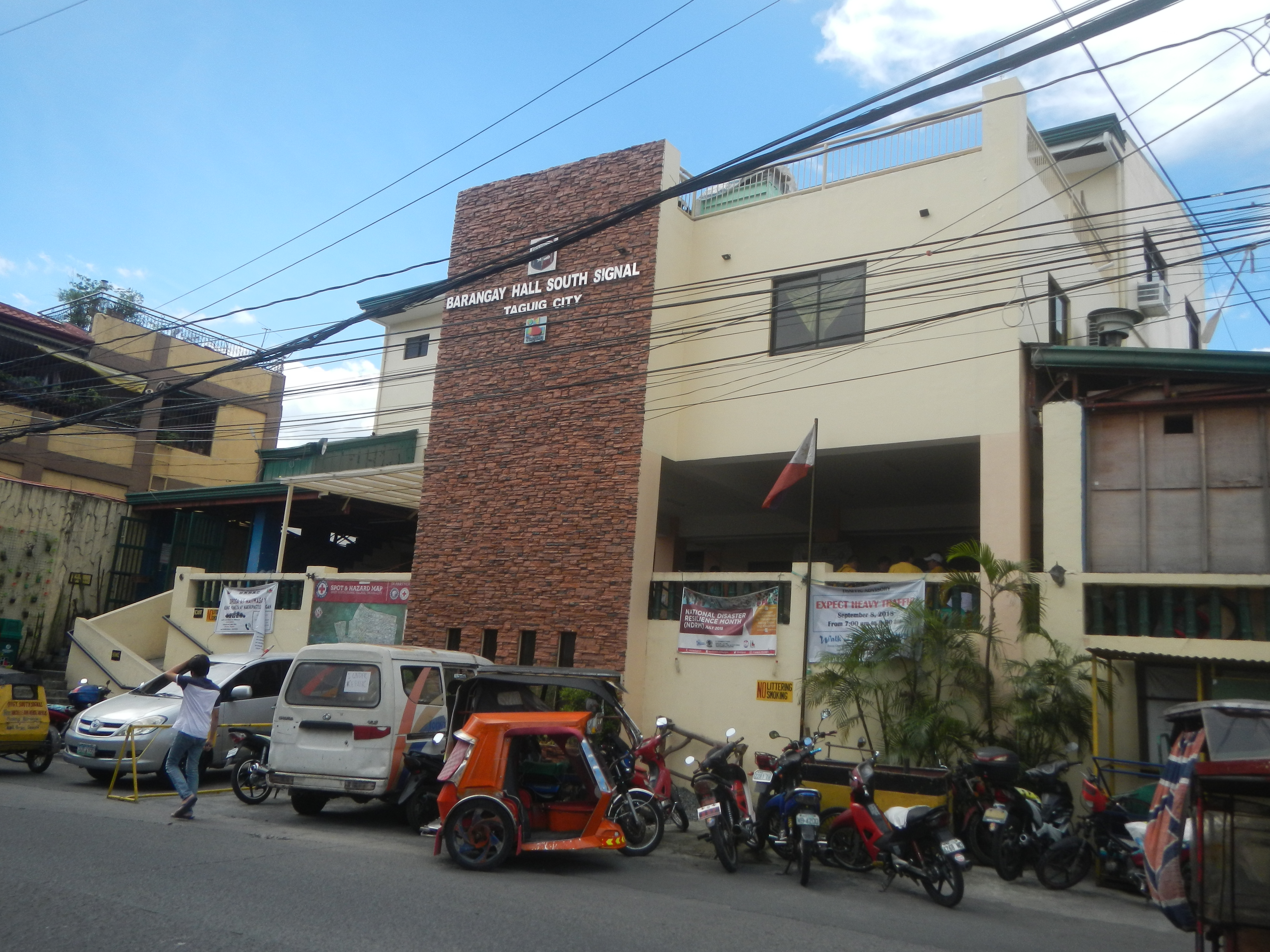
- Barangay hall
- Map of South Signal Village
- South Signal Village's location within Metro Manila South Signal Village's location within Luzon South Signal Village's location within the Philippines
- Coordinates: 14°30′9.97″N 121°3′18.47″E
- Country: Philippines
- Region: Metro Manila
- City: Taguig
- District: District 2
- Created (via plebiscite): December 28, 2008

Government
  - Type: Sangguniang Barangay
  - Barangay Captain: Jesus Laurel
  - Barangay Councilor: Glenn Daiz; Kenneth Caneda; Norman Hortilano; Ariel Viray; Cerilo Pasicolan; Francisco Galudo; Glenn Robert Roa
  - Sangguniang Kabataan Chairperson: John Mark Gabiran

Area
  - Land: 63.8 ha (158 acres)

Population (2024)
  - Total: 43,946
- Time zone: UTC+08:00
- Area code: 02

South Signal Village, officially Barangay South Signal Village and simply known as South Signal, is one of the 38 barangays of Taguig, Philippines. As of the 2024 census, the population was 43,946. The barangay was created through a plebiscite on December 28, 2008.

== History ==
The Sangguniang Panlungsod of Taguig passed City Ordinance No. 60 in 2008, which would detach a portion of Barangay Signal Village (now Central Signal Village) to form an independent barangay named as South Signal Village. A plebiscite to ratify the ordinance was conducted by the Commission on Elections on December 18, 2008, which was then proclaimed by the city's board of canvassers on December 28.

== Geography ==
South Signal Village has a total land area of 638,121 square meters (63.8 hectares). It has five adjacent barangays: Central Signal Village on the northeast and northwest, New Lower Bicutan on the southeast, Maharlika Village on the southeast and southwest, Upper Bicutan on the southwest, and Western Bicutan on the northwest and southwest. The barangay is traversed by the West Valley Fault of the Marikina Valley Fault System.

== Demographics ==
Historical population
Year	Population	±%
2010	34,118	—
2015	39,214	+14.9%
2020	43,047	+9.8%
2024	43,946	+2.1%
Source: National Statistics Office (2010 census) and Philippine Statistics Authority (2015 and 2020 census)

As of the 2024 Philippine census, there were 43,946 residents of South Signal Village.

== Government ==
In May 2009, the government of Taguig appointed Pedro Sedan as the first barangay captain (Filipino: kapitan ng barangay) of South Signal Village. Since 2023, the incumbent barangay captain is Jesus Laurel. Laurel is assisted by barangay councilors (Filipino: barangay kagawad) Glenn Daiz, Kenneth Caneda, Norman Hortilano, Ariel Viray, Cerilo Pasicolan, Francisco Galudo, and Glenn Robert Roa, and Sangguniang Kabataan chairperson John Mark Gabiran.

== Education ==
Kapt. Jose Cardones Memorial Elementary School (now Kapt. Jose Cardones Integrated School) is located in South Signal Village. The school was previously an annex of EM's Signal Village Elementary School, until it became an independent elementary school by the virtue of Republic Act No. 9152 signed by then-President Gloria Macapagal Arroyo on August 10, 2001.
