= Maharlika Village =

Barangay in Taguig, Metro Manila, Philippines

Maharlika Village Maharlika
- Barangay
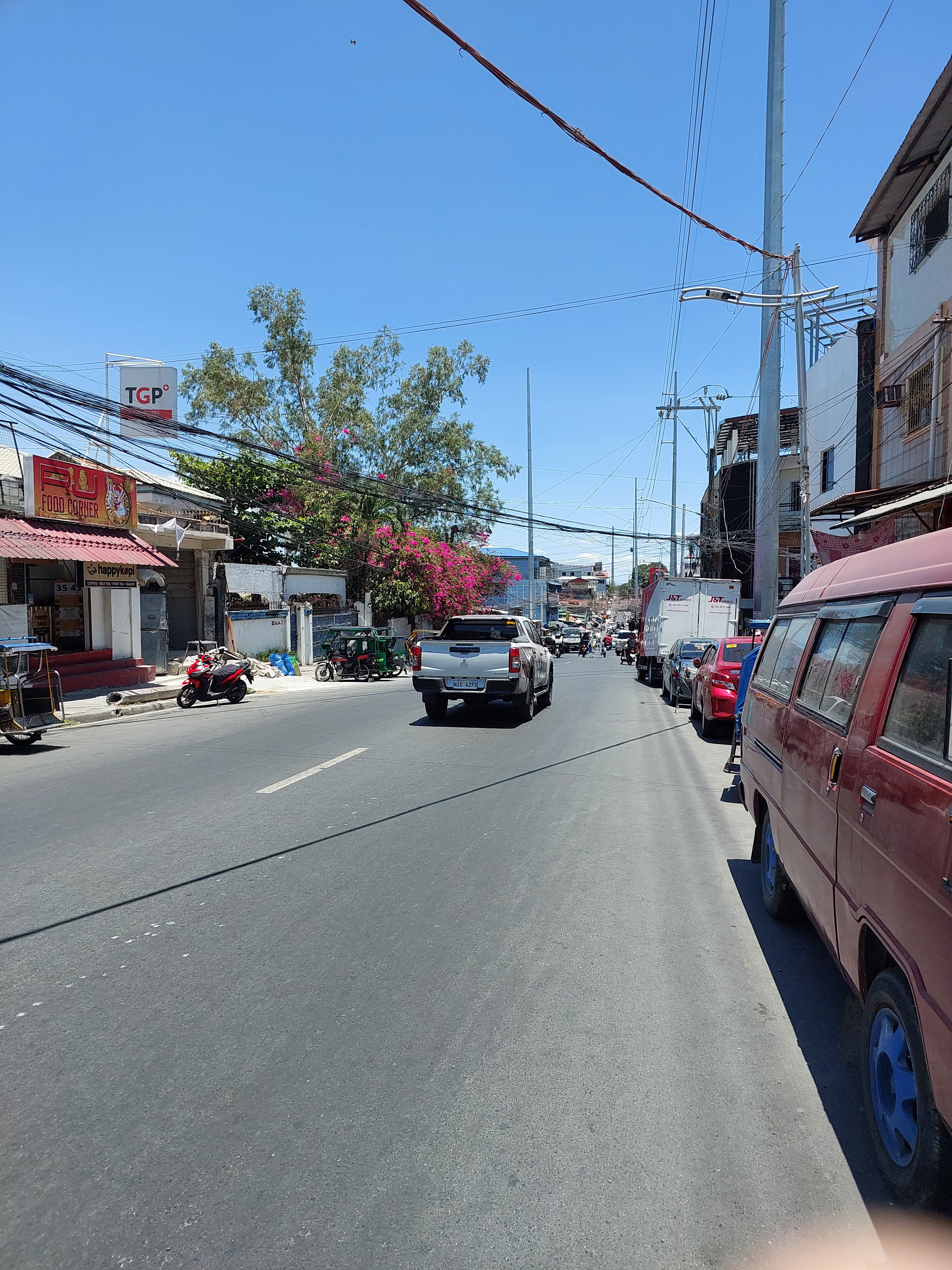
- Mindanao Avenue
- Interactive map of Maharlika Village
- Location of Maharlika Village within Metro Manila Location of Maharlika Village within Luzon Location of Maharlika Village within the Philippines
- Coordinates: 14°29′50.48″N 121°3′19.95″E
- Country: Philippines
- Region: Metro Manila
- City: Taguig
- District: District 2
- Created: January 3, 1974

Government
  - Type: Sangguniang Barangay
  - Barangay Captain: Hareem P. Pautin
  - Barangay Councilor: Hadji Akmad D. Wahab; Jamal P. Macaalin; Khalid A. Hasim; Camal M. Usman; Abdulfahad M. Musa; Hadji Esmael A. Sarip; Hayme M. Ditano
  - Sangguniang Kabataan Chairperson: Amir C. Masbud

Area
  - Total: 54 ha (130 acres)

Population (2024)
  - Total: 26,241
- Time zone: UTC+08:00
- Area code: 02

Maharlika Village, officially Barangay Maharlika and simply known as Maharlika, is one of the 38 barangays of Taguig, Philippines. As of the 2020 census, the population was 23,470. The barangay, which was created from the land that was excluded out of AFP Enlisted Men's Village on January 3, 1974, has the largest Muslim community in Metro Manila.

== History ==
Since the 1950s, a Muslim community consisting of few Moro families led by an imam named Muhammad Kusin had existed in a military reservation area for the Armed Forces of the Philippines in Taguig. They later petitioned to then-President Diosdado Macapagal to allocate five hectares of land in that area where they could establish a settlement, but Macapagal rejected their request. Since 1964, around 20 families had illegally build huts made of lawanit in the area.

Then-President Ferdinand Marcos signed Proclamation No. 1217 on January 3, 1974, which would detach a portion of AFP Enlisted Men's (EM's) Village, totaling 305,000 square meters (30.5 hectares), to become a subdivision for the Muslim settlers known as Maharlika Village. Its name was based on maharlika, which means "royalty or of noble origin". Two new sitios were created for the increasing number of settlers, namely Imelda Romualdez Marcos (named after then-First Lady Imelda Marcos) and Bandara-Ingued. Eventually, the three areas were grouped under one barangay, which was also named Maharlika Village.

== Geography ==
Maharlika Village has a total land area of 54 hectares (540,000 square meters). The barangay is traversed by the West Valley Fault of the Marikina Valley Fault System.

== Demographics ==
Historical population
Year	Population	±%
1975	121	—
1980	811	+570.2%
1985^{*}	—	—
1990	2,974	—
1995	11,268	+278.9%
2000	12,857	+14.1%
2007^{**}	16,474	+28.1%
2010	17,781	+7.9%
2015	22,944	+29.0%
2020	23,470	+2.3%
2024	26,241	+11.8%
^{*} No census was held in 1985 due to a political and economic crisis^{**} Census was delayed from the original 2005 due to the reenacted budget that lasted until 2006; Source: National Census and Statistics Office (1975, 1980, and 1990 census), National Statistics Office (1995, 2000, 2007, and 2010 census), and Philippine Statistics Authority (2015 and 2020 census)

As of the 2024 Philippine census, there were 26,241 residents of Maharlika Village.

== Government ==
Erlinda Pangandaman served as a barangay captain (Filipino: kapitan ng barangay) of Maharlika Village from 1994 to 2007. Erlinda was succeeded by Yasser Pangandaman, who served from 2007 to 2013. Yasser ran again in the 2013 barangay elections unopposed, resulting in him securing another term. Baisittee Pangandaman replaced him as the barangay captain when he ran in the 2016 local elections and won as the city councilor for the second district. Baisittee served until 2018 and sought reelection in the barangay elections that year, but she was defeated by her nephew Hareem Pangandaman Pautin. Hareem eventually got reelected in the next barangay elections in 2023. That year, Hadji Akmad Dianalan Wahab, Jamal Pangandaman Macaalin, Khalid Abo Hasim, Camal Manan Usman, Abdulfahad Mangondato Musa, Hadji Esmael Ampatua Sarip, and Hayme Menor Ditano were also elected as barangay councilors (Filipino: mga kagawad ng barangay), as well as Amir Canoy Masbud as the chairperson of Sangguniang Kabataan.

== Education ==
Maharlika Village encompasses Maharlika Village Islamic Madrasah and Maharlika Integrated School. Maharlika Village Islamic Madrasah is a madrasah that is accredited by the Department of Education to offer preschool, elementary, and secondary education. It was founded by the Maharlika Village Islamic Foundation on December 15, 1983. Maharlika Integrated School, which began operations in 2000, was previously an annex school of Silangan Elementary School in Upper Bicutan, until it was renamed as Maharlika Elementary School on September 17, 2009, before changing again to its latest name.

Informatica Technology Center was a vocational school that was accredited by the Technical Education and Skills Development Authority to offer computer-related courses. It began its construction in February 2002 and was inaugurated in February 2003.

== Landmarks ==
Maharlika Village is known for its blue-themed mosque called the Blue Mosque. The barangay also has a cemetery for Muslims called the Imam Moh Kusin Memorial Park.
