= List of schools in Taguig =

This is a list of schools in the two districts of Taguig, Metro Manila, Philippines.

== Public Tertiary ==
- Polytechnic University of the Philippines Taguig
- Technological University of the Philippines Taguig Campus
- Taguig City University
- Technical Education and Skills Development Authority
- University of the Philippines BGC
- University of Makati (inside the city's territory but de facto run by LGU of Makati)

== Private Tertiary ==
- De La Salle University Rufino (BGC) Campus
- STI College
- Lyceum International College
- St. Chamuel College & Institute of Technology
- AMA Computer Learning Center
- Enderun Colleges
- MINT College
- Open Source College
- Philippine School of Interior Design
- St. Therese School of Technology of Taguig, Inc.
- The Fisher Valley College

== International schools ==
- British School Manila
- Global Leaders International School
- International School Manila
- Leaders International Christian School of Manila
- Lyceum International College
- Treston International School
- Korean International School Philippines
- Manila Japanese School

== Elementary and high schools ==
All schools offering K-12 are supervised by the Department of Education - Schools Division of Taguig City and Pateros, located beside Upper Bicutan Elementary School, General Santos Ave., Central Bicutan, Taguig City.

=== Public Elementary Schools ===
- Bagong Tanyag Elementary School Annex A (South Daang Hari)
- Cembo Elementary School (Cembo)
- Cipriano P. Santa Teresa Elementary School (Bagumbayan)
- Ciriaco P. Tiñga Elementary School (Hagonoy)
- Comembo Elementary School (Comembo)
- Daanghari Elementary School (North Daang Hari)
- Dr. Artemio E. Natividad Elementary School (Ususan)
- East Rembo Elementary School (East Rembo)
- EM's Signal Village Elementary School (Central Signal Village)
- Eusebio C. Santos Elementary School (San Miguel)
- Fort Bonifacio Elementary School (West Rembo)
- Gat Andres Bonifacio Elementary School (Fort Bonifacio)
- Pembo Elementary School (Pembo)
- Pitogo Elementary School (Pitogo)
- Ricardo P. Cruz, Sr. Elementary School (New Lower Bicutan)
- Rizal Elementary School (Rizal)
- Silangan Elementary School (Upper Bicutan)
- South Cembo Elementary School (South Cembo)
- South Daang Hari Elementary School - Main (South Daang Hari)
- Tenement Elementary School (Western Bicutan)
- Tipas Elementary School (Palingon-Tipas)
  - Tipas Elementary School Annex (Calzada-Tipas)
- Upper Bicutan Elementary School (Central Bicutan)
- West Rembo Elementary School (West Rembo)

=== Public High Schools ===
- Bagumbayan National High School (Bagumbayan)
- Benigno "Ninoy" S. Aquino High School (Comembo)
- Fort Bonifacio High School (West Rembo)
- Gat Andres Bonifacio High School (Fort Bonifacio)
- General Ricardo Papa Memorial High School - Main (Tuktukan)
  - General Ricardo Papa Memorial High School - Annex (Ususan)
- Ma. Asuncion R. Tiñga High School (Central Bicutan)
- President Diosdado Macapagal High School (Katuparan)
- Pitogo High School (Pitogo)
- Signal Village National High School (Central Signal Village)
- Taguig National High School (New Lower Bicutan)
- Tibagan High School (East Rembo)
- Upper Bicutan National High School (Central Bicutan)
- Western Bicutan National High School (Pinagsama)

=== Public Integrated Schools ===
- Bagong Tanyag Integrated School (Bagong Tanyag)
- Kapitan Eddie T. Reyes Integrated School (Pinagsama)
- Kapt. Jose Cardones Integrated School (South Signal Village)
- Maharlika Integrated School (Maharlika)
- Napindan Integrated School (Napindan)
- Palar Integrated School (Pinagsama/PP Southside)
- Taguig Integrated School (Santa Ana)

=== Private ===
- AA Total Achievers Academy, Inc.
- Academia de San Bartolome de Taguig
- Angels of the Lord School of Taguig, Inc.
- Anne-Claire Montessori (Maria Jasee Montessori)
- Army's Angel's Integrated School (Main Campus)
  - Army's Angel's Integrated School (Annex)
- Armor Integrated Learning School of Taguig, Inc.
- Asian Christian Technological School and Colleges, Inc. (Main & Annex)
- Athens Academy, Inc.
- Balmor Christian School
- Battlefield Baptist Academy, Inc.
- Bicutan Parochial School
- Blessed Land Academy of Taguig
- Central Village Thinkers Academy
- Centerville Academy, Inc.
- Children's Integrated Learning School
- Christian Bible Baptist Academy
- Colegio de Santa Ana
- FTJCA Christian Academy
- G4 Learning Journey School, Inc.
- Gentle Lamb Academy
- God's Grace Christian Academy, Inc.
- Good Shepherd of Taguig Colleges
- Grace Christian College Foundation, Inc.
- Grant Cecilia Integrated School, Inc.
- Green Homes Integrated School, Inc.
- Hansarang Christian Academy
- Heaven's Door Christian Academy
- Holy Spirit Christian Learning Centre, Inc.
- HSL Braille College Inc.
- Huckleberry Montessori School, Inc.
  - Centerville Academy Inc. (Under Huckleberry Montessori School)
- Integrated Montessori Center (Main/Diego Branch)
  - Integrated Montessori Center (Bayani Branch)
- JF Holy One School
- Lakeview Montessori Learning Center
- Learn and Explore Montessori School, Inc.
- Little Friends of St. Mary Learning Center, Inc.
- Living Miracle Christian School
- Maria Jasse Montessori School
- Maria Montessori Holy Christian School (Taguig Branch)
- Mary Lourdes Academy, Inc.
- MCA Montessori School (Main Campus)
  - MCA Montessori School (Annex)
- MERE Academy, Inc.
- Merry Knowledge Academe, Inc.
- MGC New Life Christian Academy
- Monlimar Development Academy
- Moreh Academy
- Mount Moriah Christian Academy
- Noah's Academy
- Our Lady of Snow Excel School, Inc.
- Pateros Catholic School
- PHR-G-Gar Kinderland
- Philippine School of Scriptures
- Powell Integrated School
- SDLJ Montessori School
- Saint Francis of Assisi College – Taguig
- Saint Helena School
- Saint Ignatius
- Saint Ives School
- Saint Theodore School
- SBP Child Learning Advancement School
- Spring of Kerith Montessori School, Inc.
- Sto. Nino Catholic School
- TMB Madrasah-Montessori Learning Center
- The Abba's Orchad School, Inc.
- Thy Covenant Montessori School
- Tipas Catholic School
- Tridium Academy
- Vrice Montessori School
- Zinah Christian Academy

== Science High School ==
- Makati Science High School (Cembo)
- Taguig Science High School (San Miguel)
- Senator Renato "Compañero" Cayetano Memorial Science and Technology High School (Ususan)

== See also ==
- List of schools in Metro Manila (primary and secondary)
- List of international schools in Metro Manila
- List of universities and colleges in Metro Manila
