= Mobo =

Mobo or MOBO may refer to:

== Entertainment ==
- MOBO Awards, UK-based music awards
- Mobo, a band created by Kazumi Watanabe
- Modern Baseball (band), American rock band from Philadelphia

== People ==
- Gao Mobo (born 1952), Chinese-born Australian sinologist
- Lesley Mobo (born 1982), Filipino fashion designer
- Moritz Böhringer (born 1993), American football player for the Minnesota Vikings

== Places ==
- Mobo, Kalibo, a municipality in Aklan, Philippines
- Mobo, Masbate, a municipality in Masbate, Philippines

== Terms and slang ==
- Mobo, slang for motherboard in a computer
- Japanese modern boys, the masculine version of the Westernized modern girl
