= Hagonoy, Taguig =

Barangay in Taguig, Metro Manila, Philippines

Hagonoy
- Barangay
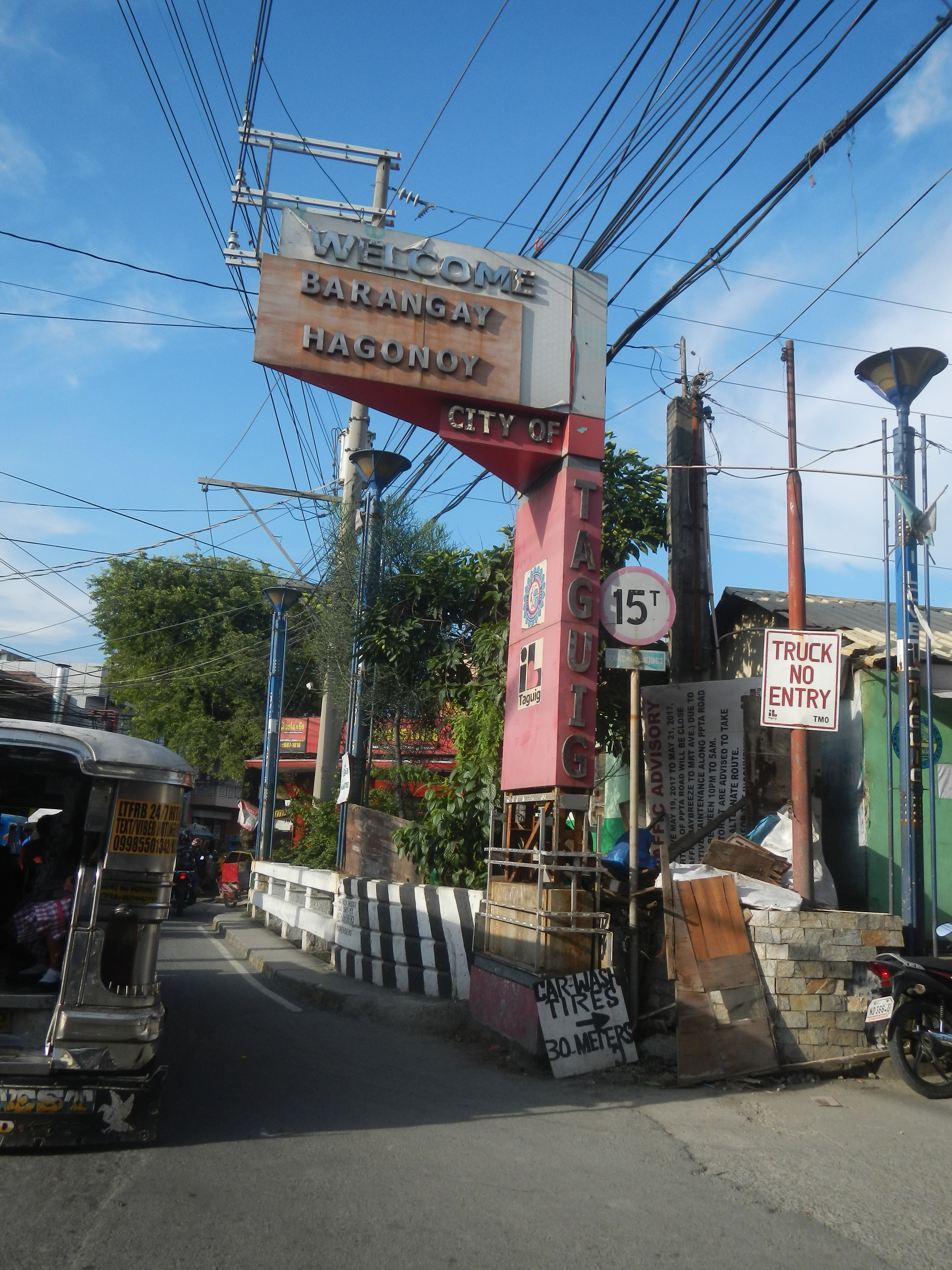
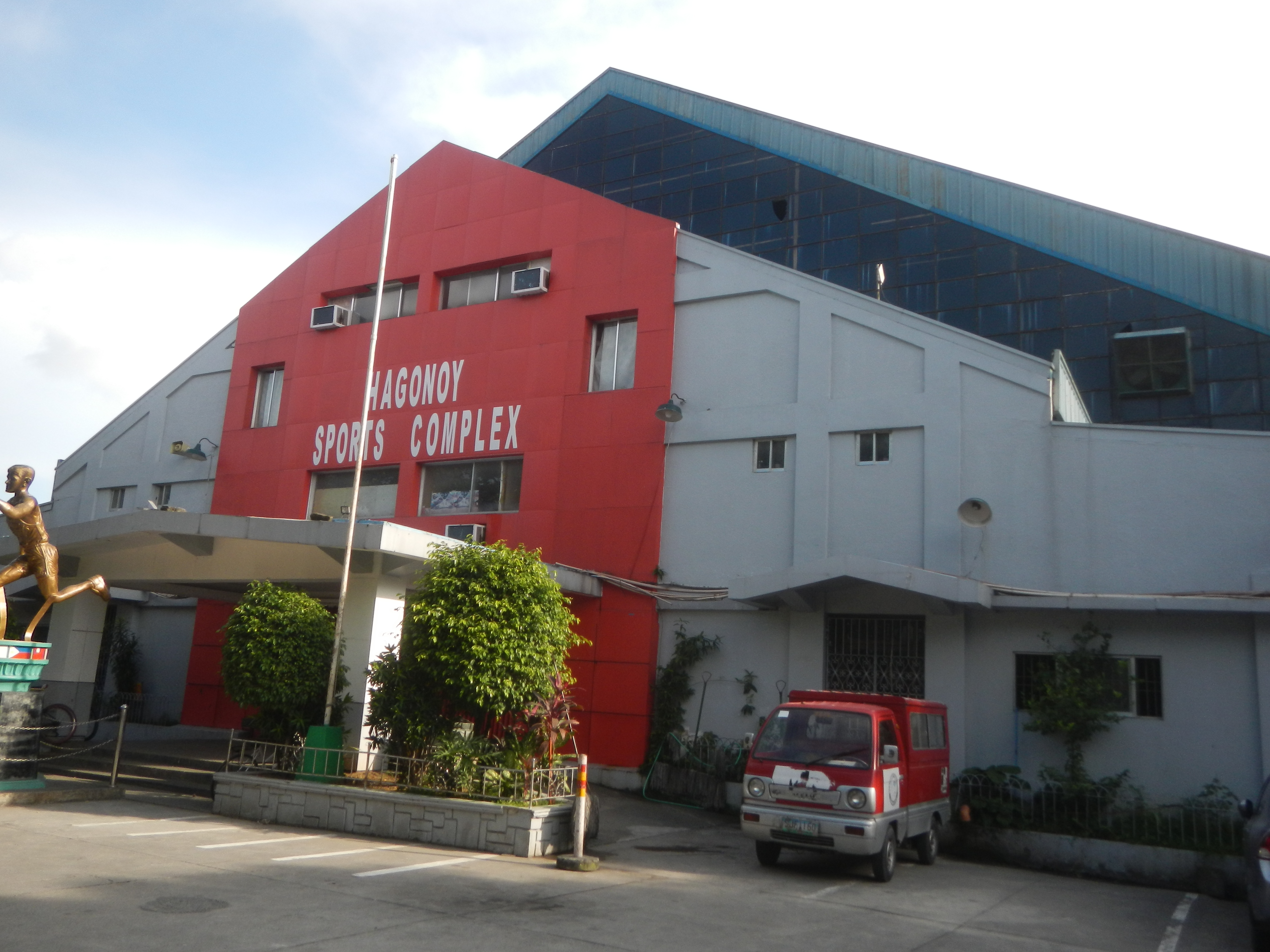
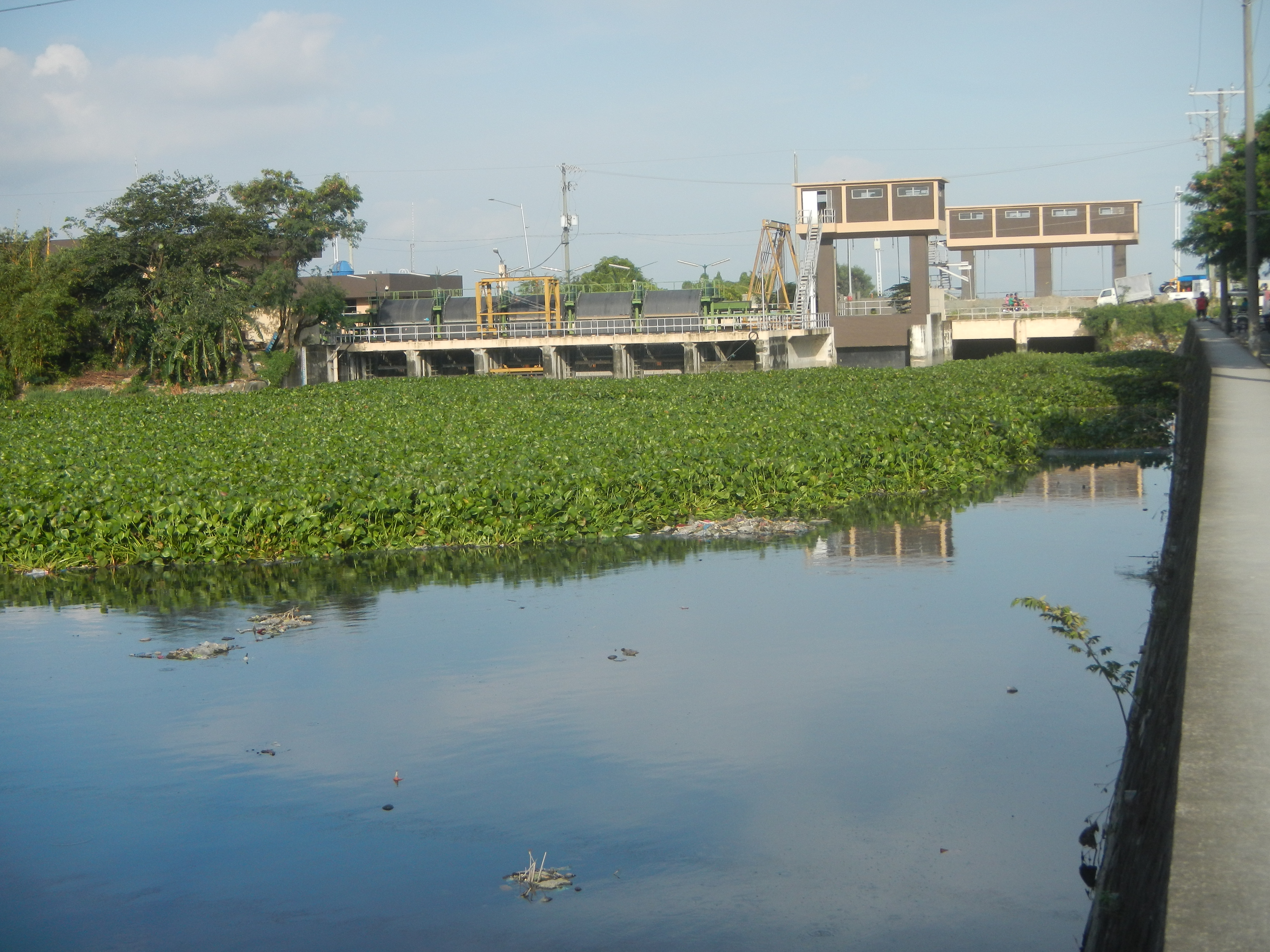
- Welcome sign Hagonoy Sports Complex Hagonoy Pumping Station

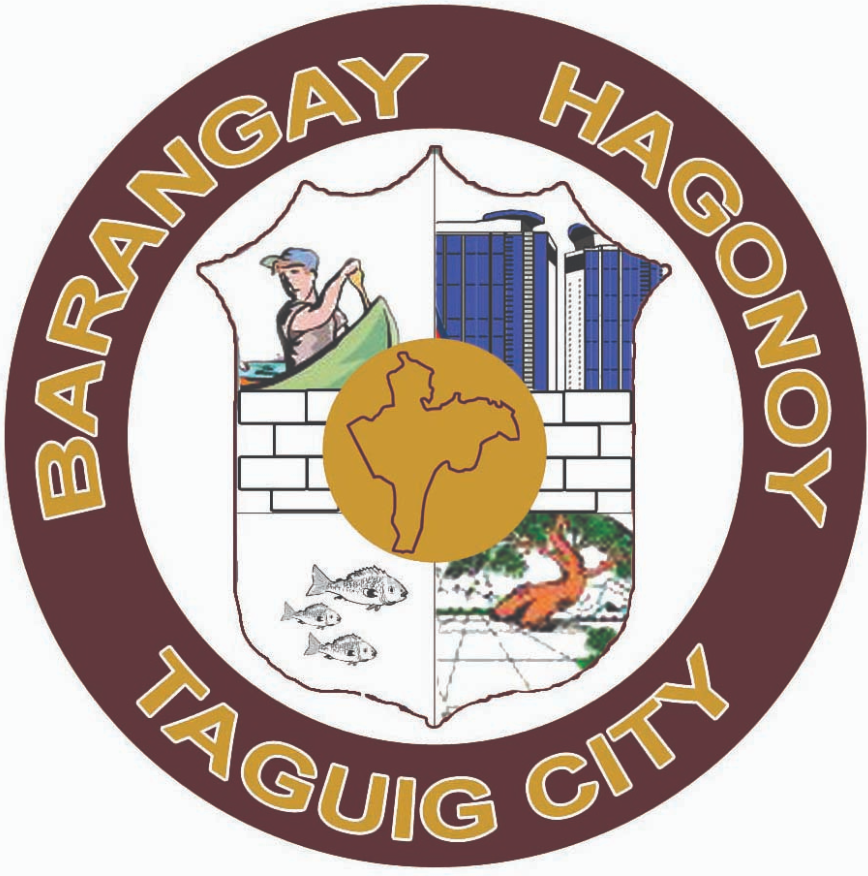
- Seal

- Location of Hagonoy within Metro Manila Location of Hagonoy within Luzon Location of Hagonoy within the Philippines
- Coordinates: 14°30′45.87″N 121°4′11.72″E
- Country: Philippines
- Region: Metro Manila
- City: Taguig
- District: District 1

Government
  - Type: Sangguniang Barangay
  - Barangay Captain: Rommel Olazo
  - Barangay Councilor: Edward Encarnacion; Donn Kenneth Joaquin; Gina Garduque; Isidro De Mesa; Marlon Bunyi; Lilibeth Bautista; Sonny Garcia
  - Sangguniang Kabataan Chairperson: Kevin Carl Julian

Area
  - Total: 1.62 km^{2} (0.63 sq mi)

Population (2024)
  - Total: 25,455
- Time zone: UTC+08:00
- Area code: 02

Hagonoy, officially Barangay Hagonoy, is one of the 38 barangays of Taguig, Philippines. As of the 2024 census, the population was 25,455. It had since existed before the arrival of Spaniards to the country and was originally one of the nine barrios that formed Taguig after the latter was established on April 25, 1587.

== History ==
The area south of Wawa settlement was flourished with a plant called "hagunoy". That area later became known as Hagonoy. It was visited by Chinese merchants during the Ming dynasty, who traded products such as bowls, plates, glasses, and cups. During the Spanish rule of the Philippines, Taguig became a pueblo (town) of the province of Manila on April 25, 1587, in which Hagonoy was one of its nine original barrios. It was then administered by Claro Cuevas as the village president (Filipino: pangulo ng nayon) after the country declared its independence from Spain on June 12, 1898. Hagonoy remained as a barrio until it was converted into a barangay by virtue of Presidential Decree No. 557 signed by then-President Ferdinand Marcos on September 21, 1974. The barangay was reduced in size after the Sangguniang Panlungsod of Taguig passed City Ordinance No. 24 to separate the San Miguel Proper from its jurisdiction to form an independent barangay to be known as San Miguel, which was ratified through a plebiscite on December 28, 2008.

== Geography ==
Hagonoy used to have a total land area of 1.62 square kilometers (162 hectares), but it lost more or less 992,800 square meters (99.28 hectares) of land when it was transferred to San Miguel. Before 2008, the barangay was bordered to the north by Barangays Bambang and Wawa, to the south by Barangays Lower Bicutan and Signal Village and Laguna de Bay, to the east by Wawa and the lake, and to the west by Signal Village and Fort Bonifacio.

The main soil type in the barangay is the Guadalupe clay loam, a coarse black soil that becomes granular to coddy when it's dry and very fine sticky when wet. The Hagonoy Creek traverses the barangay and drains to a retarding pool near Hagonoy Pumping Station operated by Metro Manila Development Authority.

== Demographics ==
Historical population
Year	Population	±%
1903	743	—
1918	852	+14.7%
1960	2,012	+136.2%
1970^{a}	5,952	+195.8%
1975	6,952	+16.8%
1980	9,005	+29.5%
1985^{b}	—	—
1990	12,372	—
1995	12,347	−0.2%
2000	16,837	+36.4%
2007^{c}	21,181	+25.8%
2010	17,975	−15.1%
2015	18,652	+3.8%
2020	21,693	+16.3%
2024	25,455	+17.3%
^{a} The Philippines began to conduct census every five years starting 1970^{b} No census was held in 1985 due to a political and economic crisis^{c} Census was delayed from the original 2005 due to the reenacted budget that lasted until 2006; Source: United States Bureau of the Census (1903 census), Census Office of the Philippine Islands (1918 census), Bureau of the Census and Statistics (1960 census), National Census and Statistics Office (1970, 1975, 1980, and 1990 census), National Statistics Office (1995, 2000, 2007, and 2010 census), and Philippine Statistics Authority (2015, 2020, and 2024 census)

As of the 2024 Philippine census, there were 25,455 people in Hagonoy.

== Government ==
Tomas Cuevas served as a barangay captain (Filipino: kapitan ng barangay) from 2010 to 2013. He was assisted by barangay councilors (Filipino: barangay kagawad) Eufrocinio Silvestre, Marlon Argame, Roberto Torres, Manolito Victoria, Ricardo Gutierrez, Vicente Espital, and Cezar Franco, and Sangguniang Kabataan (SK) chairperson Monina Cuenco. The incumbent barangay captain is Rommel Olazo, alongside barangay councilors Edward Encarnacion, Donn Kenneth Joaquin, Gina Garduque, Isidro De Mesa, Marlon Bunyi, Lilibeth Bautista, and Sonny Garcia, and SK chairperson Kevin Carl Julian, who all won the barangay and SK elections in October 2023.

== Education ==
Ciriaco P. Tiñga Elementary School, a public elementary school, and The Fisher Valley College, a private school, are located in Hagonoy.

== Landmarks ==
Several churches can be found in the barangay: the St. Michael Parish of the Roman Catholic Church, a chapel of Iglesia ni Cristo, and a meetinghouse belonging to the Church of Jesus Christ of Latter-day Saints. The Hagonoy Sports Complex can also be found in the barangay.
