= MINT College =

Private college in Taguig, Philippines

Meridian International Business, Arts and Technology College
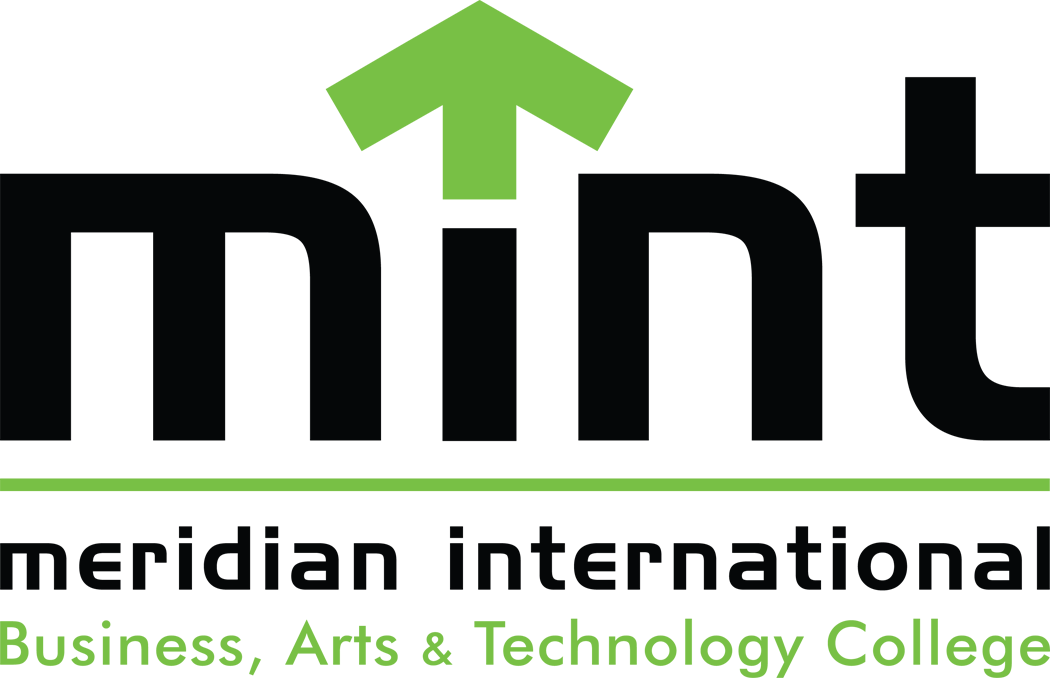
- Other name: MINT College
- Motto: Creativity, Community, Diversity
- Type: Private
- Established: 2010; 16 years ago
- Founder: Baltazar Endriga
- Religious affiliation: None (Nonsectarian)
- Location: 1030 Campus Avenue 2F CIP Bldg., McKinley Hill, Taguig, Philippines 1634; 14°32′04″N 121°03′08″E
- Website: mintcollege.com
- Location in Metro Manila Location in Luzon Location in the Philippines

Meridian International Business, Arts and Technology College (or MINT College) is a private educational institution in the Philippines that offers senior high school tracks and specialized college programs in the fields of business, arts and technology.

Its campus is located at the second floor of the Commerce and Industry Plaza, at McKinley Hill in Taguig, Philippines.

A new campus opened on August 8, 2019, at the third and fourth floor of the Silver City 1A building at Ortigas East, Pasig, Philippines.

== History ==
The school was established in December 2010 by the former president of the Cultural Center of the Philippines and University of the East, Baltazar Endriga. It offers senior high school tracks and college-degree programs centered on the disciplines of business, arts and technology. The Commission of Higher Education of the Philippines (CHED) accredited the degree programs in 2015.

In 2016, MINT College has offered academic tracks for senior high school. The school follows the Education 3.0 curriculum that prepares students to come up with their own startups and project ventures as part of learning. This nontraditional setup allows practical application of the theories learned from the selection of courses offered by the school. In 2018, the School of Fashion opened, in partnership with Lesley Mobo, a London-based Filipino fashion designer.

== Facilities ==
Its facilities include color-coded lecture rooms with interactive boards, LCD screens equipped with Apple TV, a recording booth and studio, a theater, and a café.

== Programs ==
The school offers specialized college-degree programs, a certificate program, and three senior high school tracks. There are courses that are offered with a flexible schedule for working students. Scholarships are funded by the school itself and are available for application.

=== College ===
MINT College has four main schools that offer a total of eight four-year degree programs. All of the programs are accredited by CHED.

The School of Design and Applied Arts offers degrees in Multimedia Arts and Film. The School of Performing Arts offers a degree in Theater Arts. The School of Business offers degrees in marketing, Entrepreneurial Management, and Music Business Management. The School of Technology offers degrees in Information Technology and Computer Science.

=== School of Fashion ===
On August 8, 2018, MINT, in partnership with Filipino designer Lesley Mobo, opened the School of Fashion. It is also offering scholarship grants hosted by the Red Charity Gala, an annual Philippine fashion event.

=== Senior High School ===
The school offers three academic tracks with subjects covering aspects of business, arts and technology in preparation for college. These tracks are the Accountancy, Business and Management, Arts and Design, and General Academics.

== See also ==
- List of universities and colleges in the Philippines
- List of schools in Taguig
