= NatureWorks =

Chemical manufacturer

Natureworks LLC
- Type: LLC
- Headquarters: Plymouth, Minnesota, United States
- Key people: Erik Ripple, President and CEO
- Products: Ingeo
- Parent: Cargill; PTT Global Chemical
- Website: www.natureworksllc.com

NatureWorks LLC is an international company that manufactures bioplastics—polymers derived entirely from plant resources—as an alternative to conventional plastic, which is made from petroleum. The commercial quality polymer is made from the carbon found in simple plant sugars such as corn starch to create a proprietary polylactic acid polymer (PLA) which is marketed under the brand name Ingeo. Headquartered in Plymouth, Minnesota, NatureWorks is jointly owned by Cargill and PTT Global Chemical, a Thai state-owned company.

== History ==
In 2001, a joint venture between Cargill and the Dow Chemical Company was formed under the name Cargill Dow LLC and in 2005, Cargill bought out Dow’s interest in the venture. In 2002, a manufacturing facility in Blair, Nebraska began operations. It is the world's first and largest PLA facility and it supplies NatureWorks' Ingeo biopolymer. The Blair facility slated to increase its Ingeo nameplate capacity to 150,000 metric tons in the first quarter of 2013.

In 2007 Cargill, the parent company, entered into a joint venture with Japan's Teijin, which acquired a 50% stake in NatureWorks. The partnership was dissolved in July 2009 when Teijin faced corporate restructuring in the wake of the Great Recession.

NatureWorks is headquartered in Plymouth, Minnesota, but its main manufacturing facility is in Blair, Nebraska, with additional offices Naarden, the Netherlands; Tokyo, Japan; and Bangkok, Thailand. It was considering building an additional manufacturing plant in Thailand but due to the 2014 Thai coup d'état and related turmoil it had not committed. Other countries under consideration include Malaysia and Singapore.

In 2013 NatureWorks sold 1 billion pounds of Ingeo. Its competitors in the bioplastics industry include DuPont, Braskem (BAK), Toray Industries, Lanxess AG, Bayer, BASF, and Eastman Chemical Company.

NatureWorks hosts a conference called "Innovation takes Root", which brings together Ingeo Polymer users.

== Recycling ==
Ingeo biopolymer bears the resin identification code 7 and can be chemically recycled, composted or landfilled. Ordinary home composts cannot break down the polymer, although high-temperature commercial composting systems can.

NatureWorks integrated NatureWorks PLA into the recycling system in the United States according to guidelines published by the Association of Plastic Recyclers. It commissioned an independent third party to study PLA's environmental impact, which indicated that PLA was a "neutral contributor in the existing recycling stream and can be effectively sorted using available detection technology".
