= Census in the Philippines =

National census

Philippine census
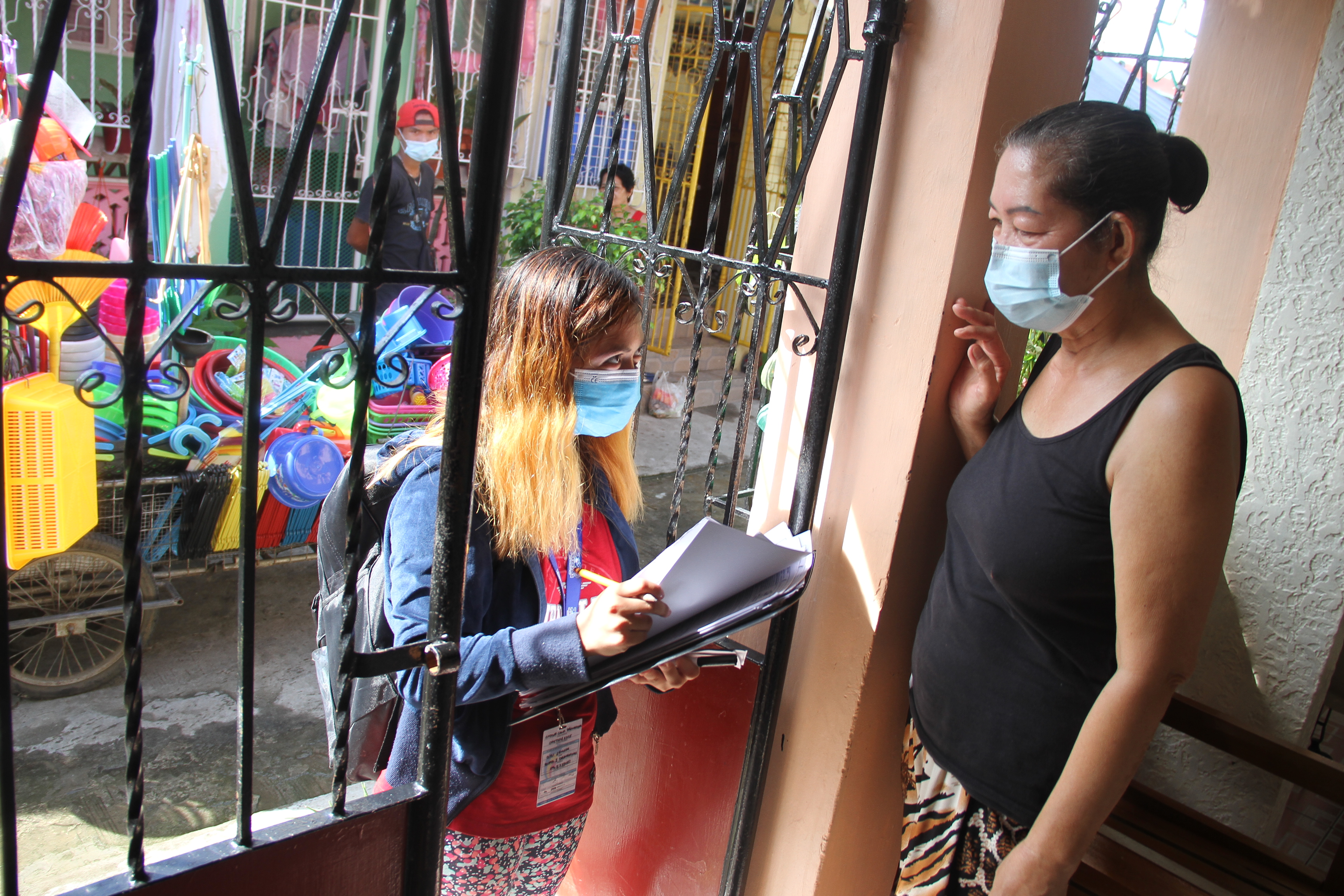
- A census enumerator interviewing a resident of Dasmariñas in October 2020
- Frequency: Every five years
- Country: Philippines
- Inaugurated: 1877; 149 years ago
- Most recent: 2024; 2 years ago
- Previous event: 2020; 6 years ago
- Next event: 2030; 4 years' time
- Organizer: Philippine Statistics Authority (since 2015)

The Philippine census (Filipino: senso/sensus) is a regularly occurring and official inventory of the human population and housing units in the Philippines. Since 1970, the population has been enumerated every five years. (Note: Except in 1985 (due to a crisis) and 2005 (due to a reenacted budget until 2006; census was later rescheduled to 2007).) Results from the censuses are used to allocate congressional seats and fund government programs.

The mid-year census is known as the Census of Population (POPCEN) (Note: Filipino: Senso ng Populasyon), while the decennial census is referred to as the Census of Population and Housing (CPH) (Note: Filipino: Senso ng Populasyon at Pabahay).

By virtue of Republic Act No. 10625, known as the Philippine Statistical Act of 2013, censuses in the Philippines have been administered by the Philippine Statistics Authority (PSA) since the 2015 census.

== History ==
The first census in the Philippines in 1591, was based on tributes collected and yielded about 666,712 people in the islands. In 1799, Friar Manuel Buzeta estimated the population count as 1,502,574. However, the first official census in the Philippines was carried out by the Spanish government pursuant to a royal decree calling for the counting of persons living as of the midnight of December 31, 1877. Based on this census, the Philippines had a population of 5,567,685 as of the reference date. This was followed by another censuses, the 1887 census that yielded a count of 5,984,727.

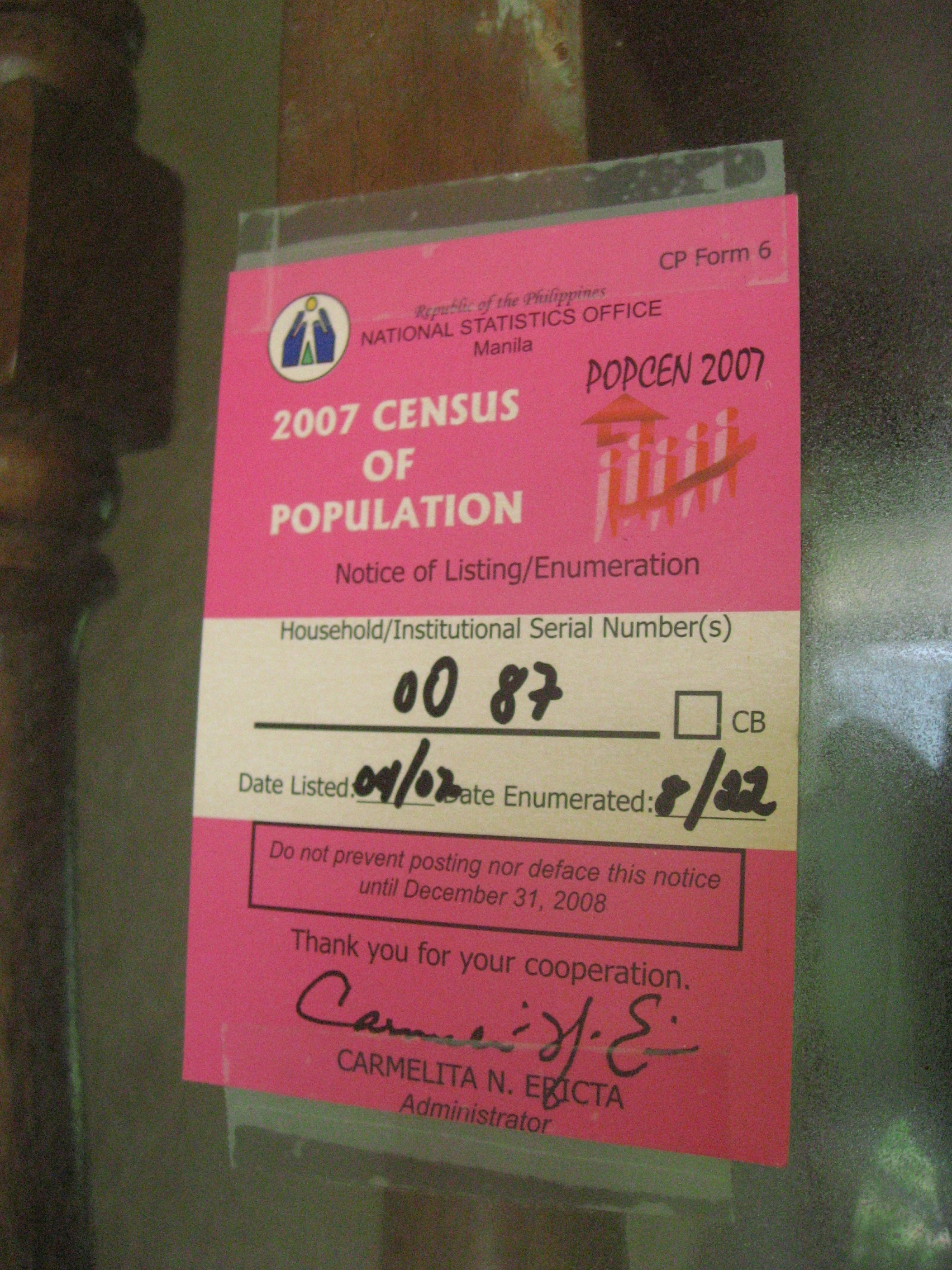
Sticker affixed to a residence after enumeration for the 2007 census

The first census conducted by the U.S. military forces took place in 1903 to fulfill Public Act 467 which was approved by the United States Philippine Commission on October 6, 1902.

A four-volume description of this census was on hand some years ago at the National Archives in San Bruno, California, but the volumes appear to have since been misplaced.

== Statistics ==
For years between the censuses, the PSA and its precursor agencies have been issuing estimates made using surveys and statistical systems.

Based on the 2024 Philippine census, the national population is 112,729,484 as of July 1, 2024. From 2020 to 2024, the population grew by 0.80% per year on the average.

Year (Note: Years in italics indicate estimates.)	Population	Change	Most populated region	Most populated city	Notes	Organized by
1799	1,502,574 (Note: Population figures until 1896 exclude non-Christians.)	—	—	—	According to Fr. Buzeta	—
1800	1,561,251	▲3.91%	—	—	According to Fr. Zuniga	—
1812	1,933,331	▲1.80 %	—	—	According to cedulas	—
1819	2,106,230	▲1.23%	—	—	According to cedulas	—
1829	2,593,287	▲2.10%	—	—	According to the Church	—
1840	3,096,031	▲1.62%	—	—	According to local officials	—
1850	3,857,424	▲2.22%	—	—	According to Fr. Buzeta	—
1858	4,290,381	▲1.34%	—	—	According to Bowring	—
1870	4,712,006	▲0.78%	—	—	According to Guia de Manila	—
1877	5,567,685	▲2.41%	—	—	First official census by the Spanish government	Spanish colonial government
1887	5,984,727	▲0.72%	—	—		Spanish colonial government
1896	6,261,339	▲0.50%	—	—	According to Plehn	—
1903	7,635,426	▲2.87%	—	Manila (219,928)	First official census by the US government	United States government
1918	10,314,310	▲2.03%	—	Manila (285,306)		United States government
1939	16,000,303	▲2.11%	—	Manila (623,492)	Only census of the Commonwealth of the Philippines	United States government
1948	19,234,182	▲2.07%	—	Manila (983,906)	First census of the independent Republic of the Philippines	Bureau of the Census and Statistics
1960	27,087,685	▲2.89%	—	Manila (1,138,611)		Bureau of the Census and Statistics
1970	36,684,486	▲3.08%	—	Manila (1,330,788)		Bureau of the Census and Statistics
1975	42,070,660	▲2.79%	—	Manila (1,479,116)		National Census and Statistics Office
1980	48,098,460	▲2.71%	Metro Manila (5,925,884)	Manila (1,630,485)		National Census and Statistics Office
1985	No census was held due to a political and economic crisis					National Census and Statistics Office
1990	60,703,206	▲2.36%	Metro Manila (7,948,392)	Quezon City (1,669,776)		National Census and Statistics Office
1995	68,616,536	▲2.32%	Metro Manila (9,454,040)	Quezon City (1,989,419)		National Statistics Office
2000	76,506,928	▲2.36%	Metro Manila (9,932,560)	Quezon City (2,173,831)		National Statistics Office
2007	88,566,732	▲2.04%	Metro Manila (11,553,427)	Quezon City (2,679,450)	Originally planned for 2005 but postponed due to 2005-06 reenacted budget	National Statistics Office
2010	92,337,852	▲1.53%	Calabarzon (12,609,803)	Quezon City (2,761,720)		National Statistics Office
2015	100,981,437	▲1.72%	Calabarzon (14,414,774)	Quezon City (2,936,116)	First census to record a population exceeding 100 million	Philippine Statistics Authority
2020	109,035,343	▲1.63%	Calabarzon (16,195,042)	Quezon City (2,960,048)	Only census conducted during COVID-19 pandemic	Philippine Statistics Authority
2024	112,729,484	▲0.80%	Calabarzon (16,933,234)	Quezon City (3,084,270)		Philippine Statistics Authority
