= Upper Bicutan =

Barangay in Taguig, Metro Manila, Philippines

- Barangay
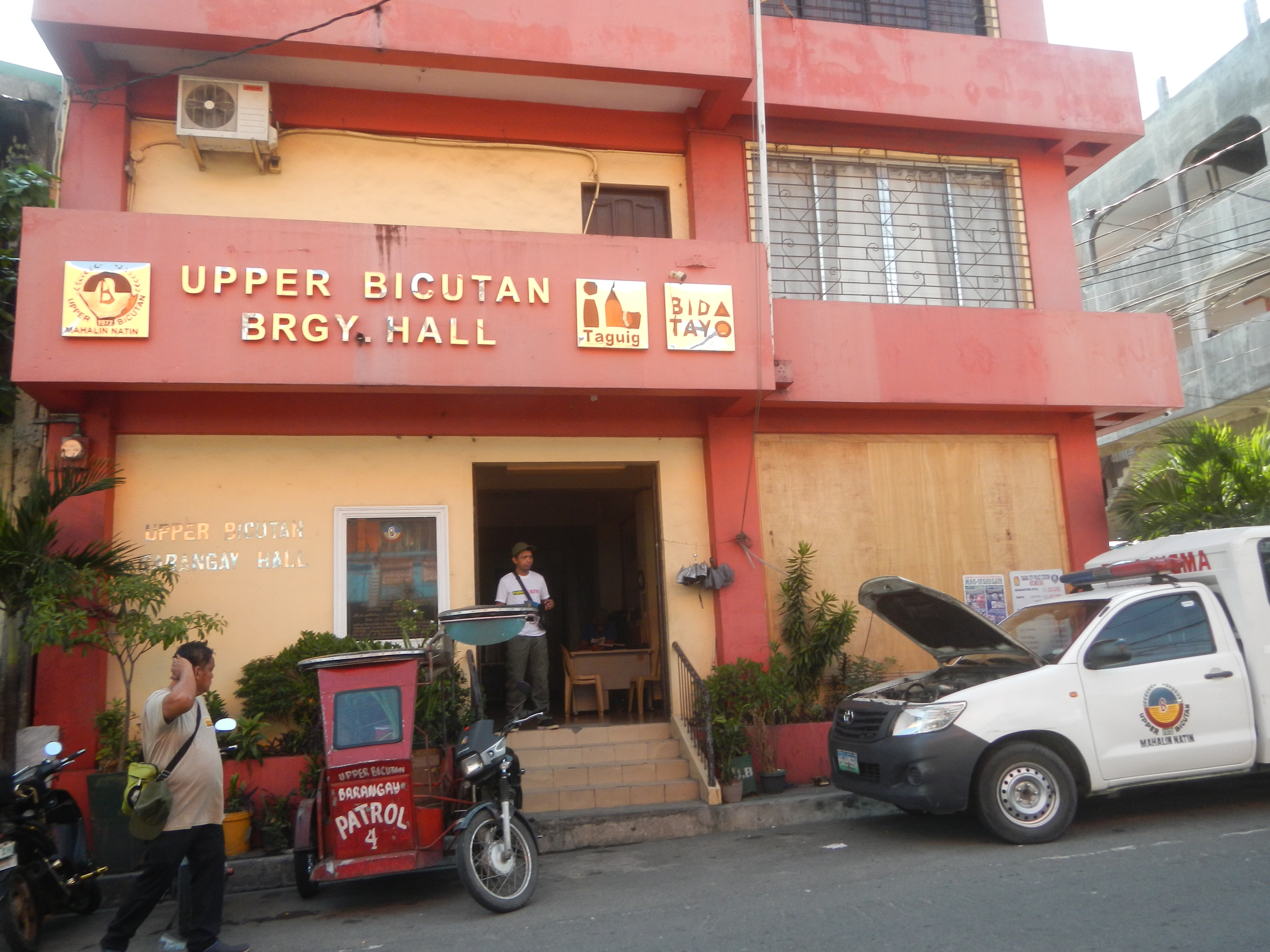
- Old Barangay Hall of Upper Bicutan

- Location within Metro Manila
- Coordinates: 14°29′14.29″N 121°3′0.98″E
- Country: Philippines
- Region: National Capital Region
- City: Taguig
- District: 2nd Legislative district of Taguig
- Established: 1972

Government
  - Type: Barangay
  - Barangay Captain: Francis Sunga
  - Barangay Councilor: Queen Carreon; Sheila Camangian; Gernand Espejon; Robert Teodosio; Maiko Guzman; Arvin Penolio; Elma Manalo
  - Sangguniang Kabataan Chairperson: Cris Ivan Guzman

Population (2024)
  - Total: 47,397
- Time zone: UTC+8 (PST)
- Postal Code: 1633

Upper Bicutan (PSGC: 137 607 015) is one of the 38 barangays of Taguig, Philippines.

It is bounded by Cucumber Road and Western Bicutan in the north, a small creek along Sitio Imelda and South Signal Village in the northeast, Maharlika Village and Lapu-Lapu Street in the southeast, A. Bonifacio Avenue and Central Bicutan in the south and San Martin de Porres, Parañaque in the west.

== History ==
In 1909, Bicutan is land surrounded by Pasig, Taguig, and Parañaque. A large part of it was covered by Fort William McKinley. Powered by Proclamation No. 423 signed by Carlos P. Garcia on July 12, 1957, the land was initially allocated only for soldiers.

Due to the requests of citizens as well as by Pasig, Parañaque and Taguig governments that Bicutan not be included in the areas stated in the Proclamation 423, then-President Diosdado Macapagal signed Proclamation No. 246 that directed Bicutan to not be included in the operation of Proclamation No. 423. In the years 1964 and early 1965, the occupiers had their status as owners of their own land confirmed.

The formerly vacant area was soon filled with houses. Before the end of the year, the population of Bicutan has not dropped below 3,600 families.

Gradually the population rose until a lack of schools was recognized for this area, which was still remote from other urban areas. Therefore, on July 16, 1966, a collaborative effort led to the erection of a school.

The Sangguniang Barangay Upper Bicutan was under the management of Barangay Captain Venancio Osano. Upper Bicutan's Osano Park was named after him.

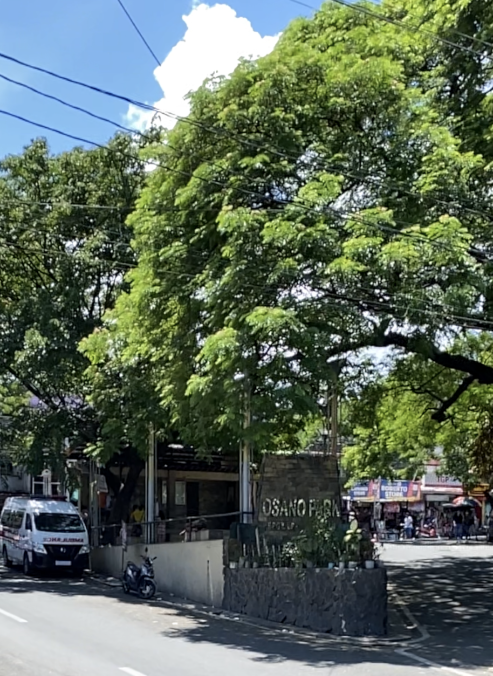
Osano Park in Bicutan, Taguig, Metro Manila, Philippines

Soon the community had a large water tank, an elementary school and a few paved roads, as well as the availability of electricity.

As a result, City Ordinances number 24-27, 57–61, 67–69, and 78, series of 2008 and the resulting plebiscite on December 28 of the same year, Purok 1, 2a, 3 and 4, as well as Sitio Central, were separated from the barangay and reconstituted as a new barangay, Central Bicutan. The barangay retained Purok 2b, 5 and 6, as well as Sitio Imelda. These were later reorganized into Phases 1-8.
