= 2015 Philippine census =

2015 Census of Population
- August 10, 2015 (start date)
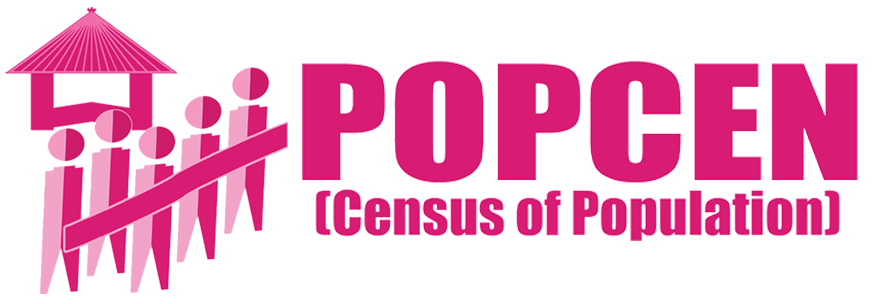
- Logo

General information
- Country: Philippines
- Topics: Census topics: People and population; Families and living arrangements; Employment; Housing
- Authority: Philippine Statistics Authority
- Website: psa.gov.ph

Results
- Total population: 100,981,437 (▲1.72%)
- Most populous province: Cavite (3.68 million)
- Least populous province: Batanes (17.2 thousand)

The 2015 Census of Population (POPCEN 2015) was the fourteenth census in the Philippines and the first census conducted by the Philippine Statistics Authority.

== Background ==
The Philippine Statistics Authority (PSA) was formed from the merger of the National Statistics Office and three other major statistical government agencies by virtue of Republic Act 10625, or the Philippine Statistical Act of 2013. The same law obliges the PSA to conduct the national censuses in the Philippines starting with the 2015 census.

90,000 enumerators and 23,000 supervisors were employed for the conduct of the census. Enumerators made house-to-house visits and institutional surveys for the census. The census began on August 10, 2015.

The census was criticized by the National Council on Disability Affairs for excluding questions regarding disability.

== Results ==
President Benigno Aquino III declared the results of the 2015 census as official through Proclamation No. 1269 dated May 13, 2016. The POPCEN 2015 recorded a population of 100,981,437 for the Philippines as of August 1, 2015. The 2010 census recorded a national population of 92,337,852; a 1.72% yearly increase.

Calabarzon has the largest population among the Philippines' regions with 14,414,774 people while the Cordillera Administrative Region is the smallest with 1,722,006 people. Cavite (3.68 million) has the largest population among the country's provinces, while Batanes (17.2 thousand) has the least. Quezon City has the biggest population among the country's highly urbanized cities with 2.94 million people.

== Application ==
The population count recorded by the 2015 census, was used as basis for the creation of new legislative districts:

- Caloocan (3rd district) – created from the 1st district
- Rizal (3rd and 4th districts) – created from the 2nd district
- Aklan (1st and 2nd districts)
- Santa Rosa, Laguna
- Calamba, Laguna

== See also ==
- Population and housing censuses by country
