= Ingeo =

Ingeo is a range of polylactic acid (PLA) biopolymers owned by NatureWorks. Resinex Group distributes Ingeo in Europe.

Ingeo is created using carbon stored in plants via photosynthesis and takes the form of dextrose sugar. These sugars are then converted into a biopolymer through the processes of fermentation and separation. The resulting resin can then be injection molded into plastic goods, extruded for film applications, thermoformed into packaging, or extruded for use in textiles. However, its use in textiles is limited because of its limited comfort properties. Due to its biodegradability, PLA is applied in geotextiles, where the objective is that the material over time disappears.

PLA is more resistant to ultraviolet light than some synthetic plastics and has relatively low flammability. Due to its relatively higher hydrophobic character compared to the common polyester fibers, Ingeo is often blended with cotton and wool. This blend of materials results in lighter garments that can repel more moisture. PLA can be disposed of in the biological waste stream. In addition, like most polyesters, it can be recycled.

Ingeo is also used in packaging and plastic bottles. Its appearance can range from clear to opaque, and it can be flexible or rigid. The biopolymer is similar to polystyrene in exhibiting tensile strength and modulus comparable to hydrocarbon-based thermoplastics. Much like polyester, it resists grease and oil. Similarly, it also offers a flavor and odor barrier. Ingeo provides heat seal-ability at temperatures equivalent to those of polyolefin sealant resins.

== See also ==
- Bioplastics
- Biodegradable plastic
