= New Lower Bicutan =

Barangay in Taguig, Metro Manila, Philippines

- Barangay
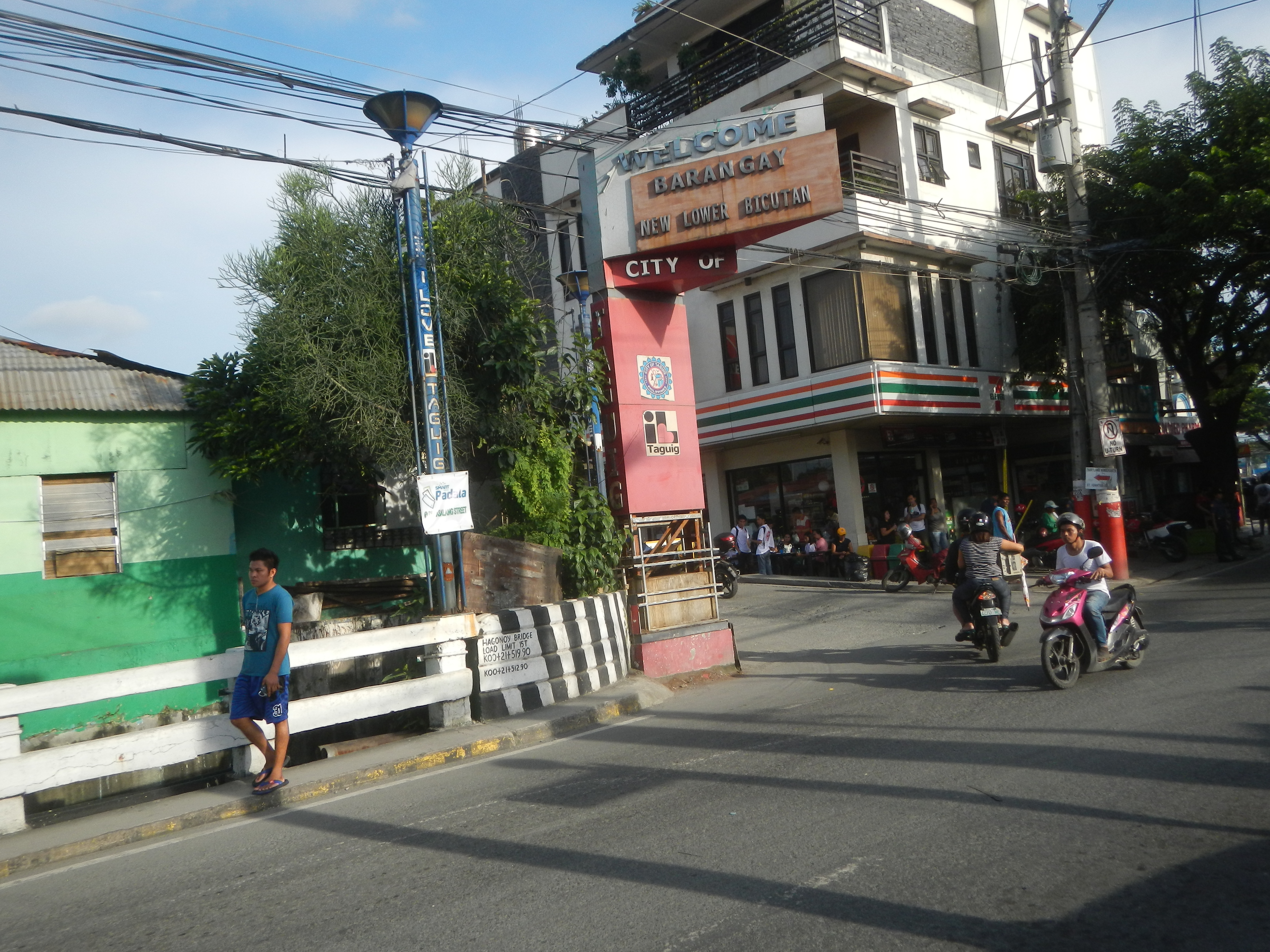
- Welcome sign

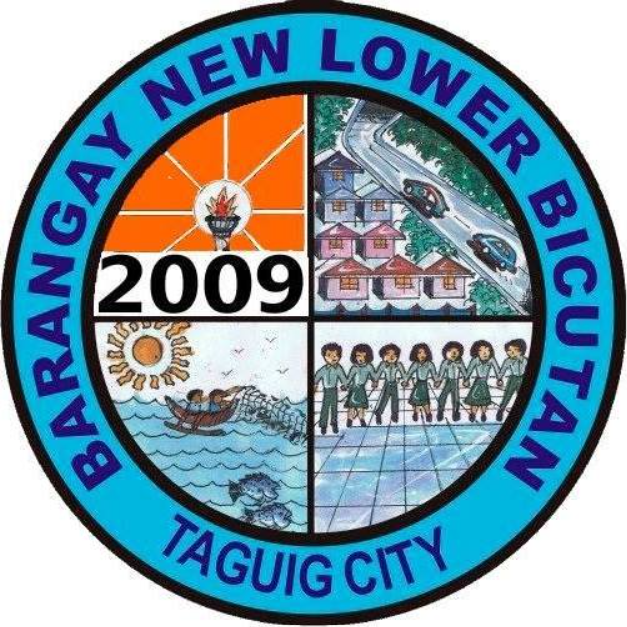
- Seal
- Map of New Lower Bicutan and the location of the barangay hall
- New Lower Bicutan's location within Metro Manila New Lower Bicutan's location within Luzon New Lower Bicutan's location within the Philippines
- Coordinates: 14°30′19.23″N 121°3′55.31″E
- Country: Philippines
- Region: Metro Manila
- City: Taguig
- District: District 1
- Created (via plebiscite): December 28, 2008

Government
  - Type: Sangguniang Barangay
  - Barangay Captain: Ernesto Rafael, Jr.
  - Barangay Councilor: John Aldrin Fermin; Conchita Faderog; Nickson Paguirigan; Ivie Mariano; Alfredo Enano; Princess Darwiza Bayan; Ruel Dela Cueva
  - Sangguniang Kabataan Chairperson: Kate Papa

Area
  - Land: 10.61 ha (26.2 acres)

Population (2024)
  - Total: 59,120
- Time zone: UTC+08:00
- ZIP Code: 1632
- Area code: 02

New Lower Bicutan, officially Barangay New Lower Bicutan, is one of the 38 barangays of Taguig, Philippines. As of 2024, it has a population of 59,120 people. New Lower Bicutan was created through a plebiscite on December 28, 2008, separating it from Barangay Lower Bicutan.

== History ==
The Sangguniang Panlungsod of Taguig passed City Ordinance No. 69 on September 15, 2008, which would detach a portion of Barangay Lower Bicutan to form an independent barangay to be called New Lower Bicutan. A plebiscite to ratify the creation of the barangay was conducted by the Commission on Elections in the city on December 18, 2008, which was then proclaimed by the city board of canvassers 10 days later.

== Geography ==
New Lower Bicutan has a total land area of 106,100 square meters (10.61 hectares). The barangay is bordered to the northeast by M.R.T. Avenue (formerly known as Pio Felipe Street), to the east and southeast by Laguna de Bay, to the south by Teodoro Santos Street, Taguig Bethel Temple, and Lots 350, 50, and 249 PLS 272, and to the west and northwest by Barrameda Street, Maguindanao Street, Alfredo Cruz Street, Transmission Line, and Barangay Signal Village.

== Demographics ==
Historical population
Year	Population	±%
2010	34,897	—
2015	49,829	+42.8%
2020	55,928	+12.2%
2024	59,120	+5.7%
Source: National Statistics Office (2010 census) and Philippine Statistics Authority (2015, 2020, and 2024 census)

As of the 2024 Philippine census, there were 59,120 people residing in New Lower Bicutan.

== Government ==
In May 2009, Nixon Faderog was appointed by Taguig as the barangay captain (Filipino: kapitan ng barangay) of New Lower Bicutan following its creation. Aurelio Padilla, who later served as a barangay captain, was killed in January 2015. Since the barangay and Sangguniang Kabataan (SK) elections in October 2023, the incumbent barangay captain is Ernesto Rafael, Jr. The current barangay councilors (Filipino: barangay kagawad) are John Aldrin Fermin, Conchita Faderog, Nickson Paguirigan, Ivie Mariano, Alfredo Enano, Princess Darwiza Bayan, and Ruel Dela Cueva. Kate Papa serves as the SK chairperson.

== Education ==
New Lower Bicutan encompasses Ricardo P. Cruz Sr. Elementary School, a public elementary school, and Taguig National High School, a public high school. The Philippine Coast Guard has a training school in the barangay located at M. L. Quezon Street.
