= Colegio de Santa Ana =

Roman Catholic school in Taguig, Philippines

Colegio De Santa Ana
- Dalubhasaan ng Santa Ana

Location
- 1 Liwayway Street, Santa Ana; NCR; Taguig; Philippines
- 14°31′34″N 121°04′26″E

Information
- Former name: Santa Ana Parochial School (1980-1999)
- Type: Private Roman Catholic Parochial Coeducational Basic and Higher education institution
- Motto: Timor Dei Est Initium Sapientiae (The Fear of the Lord is the Beginning of Wisdom)
- Religious affiliation: Roman Catholic
- Established: 1980
- Chairman: Most Rev. Mylo Hubert C. Vergara, D.D.
- Director: Rev. Fr. Edgardo B. Barrameda
- Principal: Lennie A. Montevirgen
- Enrollment: 1000+
- Campus: Urban
- Colors: Blue & Yellow
- Affiliations: CEAP; MAPSA; PaDSS; GPSOA
- Website: CDSA

The Colegio de Santa Ana (CDSA) is a private Parochial institution located in Santa Ana, Taguig, Philippines. Founded in 1980 by Rt. Rev. Msgr. Augurio I. Juta, CDSA offers a Catholic education.

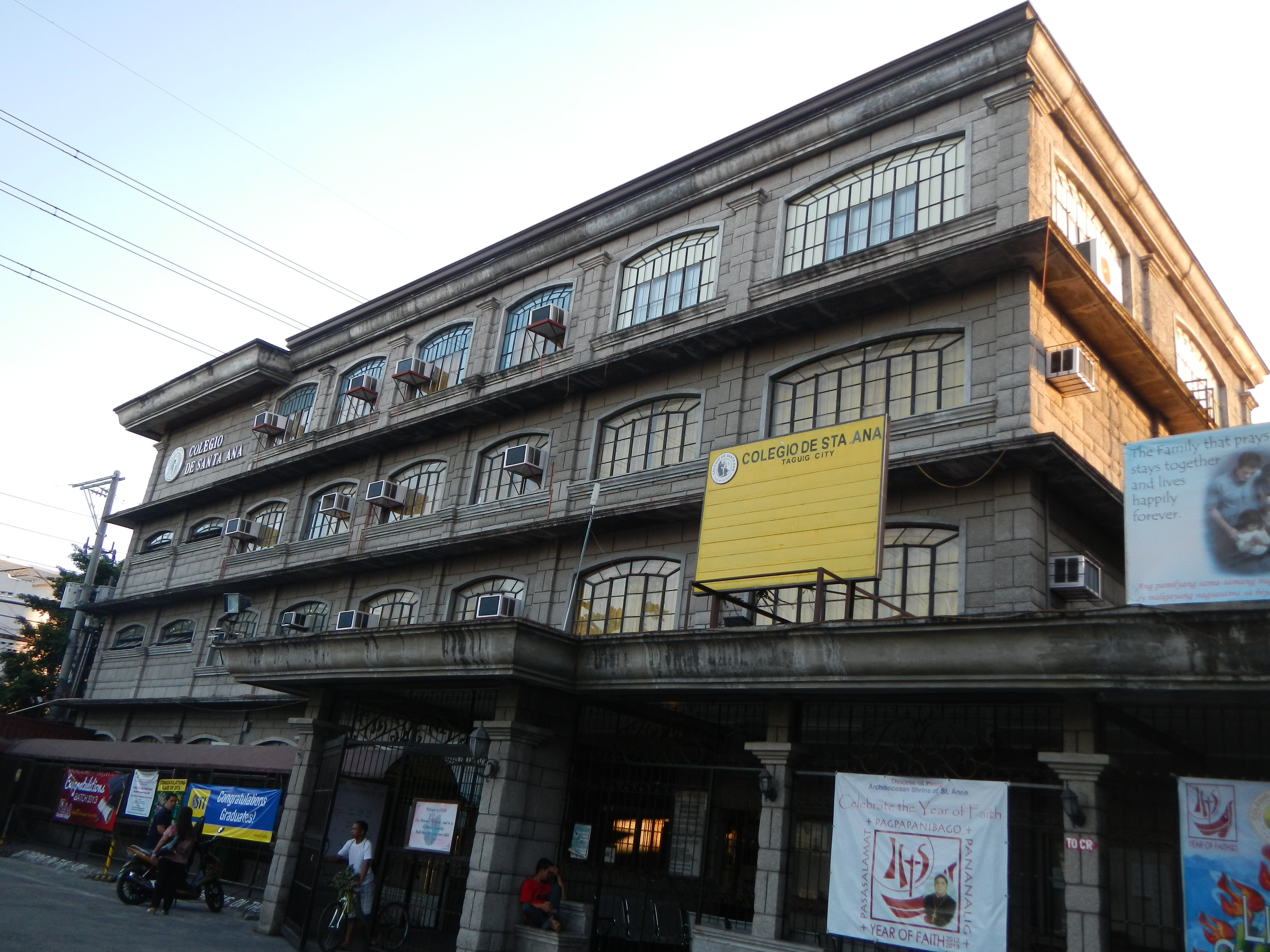
Colegio de Santa Ana

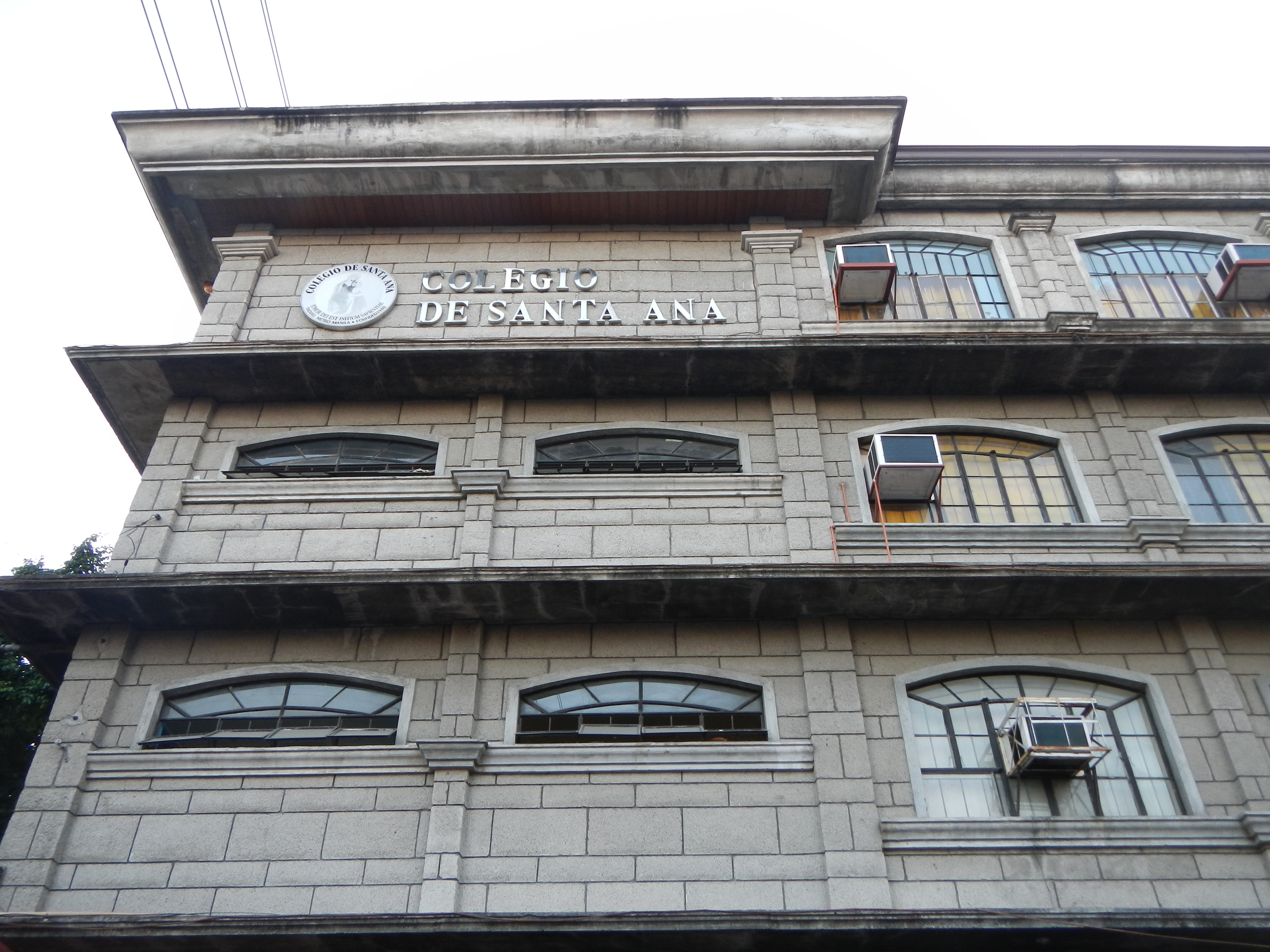
College facade

== History ==
Logo of then Santa Ana Parochial School

Logo of Santa Ana Parochial School during Msgr. Suñga's term

Logo of Colegio de Santa Ana

=== 2019–2020 ===
A new 5-storey building is being constructed for the Senior High School department and a new home for the Clinic, Guidance Office and Library. The new building is expected to be finished in time for the opening of SY 2020–2021.

== Course offerings ==
Colegio de Santa Ana offers the K-12 Curriculum, as per DepEd implementation.

Preschool:

- Nursery
- Kinder

Elementary:

- Grades 1 to 6

Junior High School:

- Grades 7 to 10

Senior High School

- Grades 11 to 12

Summer Enrichment Programs: Taekwondo, Basketball, Volleyball, Ballet, Reading

Previously, the school offered Collegiate-level courses but has since stopped offering the same.

== Current administrators ==
- Director: Rev. Fr. Edgardo B. Barrameda
- Principal: Mrs. Lennie Ansay Montevirgen
- Assistant Principal: Mrs. Criselda P. Cruz
- Finance Officer: Mrs. Mary Ann S. Okol
- CCF Head: Sr. Leonila B. Guerra, FMA
