= Lesley Mobo =

Filipino fashion designer (born 1983)

- Born: Lesley Mobo; 7 November 1982 (age 43); Philippines
- Education: Central Saint Martins
- Occupation: Fashion Designer
- Parent(s): Bonifacio Mobo Jr. Milagros Mobo

Lesley Mobo is a Filipino fashion designer based in London.

== Career ==
Mobo has worked in Paris and London. He spent his early years in Philippines before moving to London to study Fashion. After gaining a University degree in Biology and a scholarship offer from a Medical school, he instead turned his hands into fashion design. Graduating from Central St Martin's in 2002 with a First Class B.A. Honours Degree in Fashion, his final year collection titled "Maniac" was co-sponsored by Cerruti allowing him to use luxurious tailoring fabrics from Lanifico Fratelli Cerruti Italy. He also received the Colin Barnes Award for fashion illustration from Central St Martin's, a nomination in the Chartered Society of Designers Fashion Awards held in the British Natural History Museum, and participated in the ‘Fashion in Motion exhibition exhibition at the Victoria and Albert Museum from which his works were featured in the BBC News. In 2002 he was interviewed by John Galliano for the House of Christian Dior, and has also assisted for Clements Ribeiro and Cacharel. In 2002 he was scouted from college by Mohammed Al Fayed owner of Harrods Department store, he accepted a designer post and helped established a lifestyle brand in Harrods, London.

In 2003 he was promoted to Head Designer for the Jasmine Di Milo label working closely with its design team and Jasmine Al Fayed. As a pioneering member of the team he helped the brand to grow by showcasing its latest collection every season during Paris Fashion Week at the grand palatial Hôtel Ritz Paris and Villa Windsor , boasting more than 370 of the most sought-after stockists worldwide.

In 2004 he completed an M.A. in Fashion at Central Saint Martin's gaining a Distinction where he studied under the tutelage of the legendary professor Louise Wilson OBE . He showcased his M.A collection Obesity in the North Pole for Autumn/Winter 04-05 at London Fashion Week in February 2004, in Florence (winning the Emilio Pucci Award) and at the International Talent Support in Trieste where he caught the approving eyes of Renzo Rosso of Diesel, Ennio Capasa of Costume National and Raf Simons when he won the International Diesel Award In the same year he was invited by the world's most famous debating society, the Oxford Union, to present his Obesity in the North Pole collection to University of Oxford students. In 2005 he designed a sell-out capsule collection called Lesley Mobo by Diesel using Ingeo fibre which was manufactured by Staff International S.p.A., distributed and sold by Diesel in its major flagship stores in London, Milan, Paris, New York, Antwerp, Berlin and Tokyo.

In 2005 he designed men's underwear for Absolut Label 1879 Collection in collaboration with Absolut Vodka Sweden.

In 2008 he was invited by the University of the Arts London, to sit on their Industrial Advisory panel for the London College of Fashion, and in March he was honoured to be invited by the Ayala Corporation to participate in the Bravo festival , a tribute to Philippine Artists showcasing his Matavenero Collection. In the same year he created his underwear line for men and women in partnership with Bench, one of the country's fastest growing global brands in Asia and the Middle East.

In 2009 he started wholesaling his MOBO womenswear line in Paris during Paris Fashion Week with his clothes exhibited at Musée du Louvre, and was featured in Italian Vogue. The brand is sold in selected Independent boutiques and department stores in Hong Kong, Japan, Korea, Greece, Spain, Germany, Italy, France, Russia, Lebanon, Jordan, Egypt, Bahrain, Riyadh, Dubai and Qatar.

After leaving Harrods, in 2011 he has been approached by L'Wren Scott to head its global design team and to help improve the trading position of its fashion brand and drive sales.

On 25 March 2012 ETC Channel announced Lesley Mobo as the finale judge of Project Runway Philippines Season 3, It was the most watched episode from Solar Entertainment Corporation, which handles the production, stated that the three-year gap from the previous season was due to "internal concerns" it needed to address as ETC moves from cable to a "free-to-air" format.

On 29 October 2012 he staged the biggest fashion show in South East Asia at the Mall of Asia Arena with a 45 piece collection for Cignal Digital TV and TV5 a premier satellite TV provider in South East Asia, together with its living/Lifestyle magazine channel, Colors TV Channel.

From 2012-2015 he consulted for both luxury and high street brands in the UK and Asia. In 2013-2015 he designed his T-shirt line "MOBO Lesley Mobo" Feel The Sea concept for Women, Men, Girls, Kids and Babies for the Japanese giant brand Uniqlo selling in China, Hong Kong, Macau, Korea, Taiwan, Singapore, Malaysia, Indonesia, Philippines, Thailand, Australia and U.S.A. making it one of the best selling line of products in Uniqlo Stores for 4 years.

In 2014 he was listed in the 6th edition of Who's Who in Fashion published by Bloomsbury Publishing and Fairchild Books.

Early 2015 it was announced that the designer will be launching a new Underwear Collection and a perfume line for men and women with retail giant Suyen Corporation and Bench, the licensing deal is primarily marketed within Asia and the Middle East.

In 2015 he was hired by Touker Suleyman a British-Turkish Cypriot fashion retail entrepreneur and investor to head the design for Ghost. Suleyman purchased UK fashion label Ghost after its owner, KCAJ, an Icelandic investment fund, cut investment following the collapse of the Icelandic banking market.[15] The acquisition safeguarded 142 jobs across the company. In the same year Mobo designed the "Salma dress" for James Bond "Spectre" worn by Léa Seydoux. The dress ranked 7th of "The best Bond girl fashion moment" of All Time both by American Vogue and British Vogue.

== School of Fashion ==
On August 8, 2018, Lesley Mobo in partnership with Meridian International Business, Arts and Technology College (or MINT College), opened the School of Fashion. It is also offering scholarship grants hosted by the Red Charity Gala, an annual Philippine fashion event.

== Lesley Mobo Chocolates ==
In 2020, during the pandemic, the designer created a limited edition chocolates "Si Aida, Is Lorna, Is Fe". He collaborated with Filipino chocolate brand Auro and Chef Victor Magsaysay "an homage to the islands". Sold and distributed by Auro in the Philippines, Taiwan, Bahrain, Australia and Japan. Proceeds went to Auro's Agricultural programs in turning Filipino farmers into Agri-entrepreneurs.

His résumé includes work collaborations with Uniqlo , Diesel, Absolute Vodka Sweden, Zandra Rhodes, Bench Asia, Harrods, House of Fraser, Ghost London, Clements Ribeiro, Cacharel, Allegra Hicks, stylist Jane How, stylist Sarah Richardson and the presentation of design works for designers such as Donna Karan and Phoebe Philo for Chloe and Garrard & Co. formerly Asprey & Garrard whilst his works have been exhibited in the Asian Fashion Grand Prix in Osaka in 1998, the Future Map exhibition in The London Institute Mayfair Gallery, Fashion in Motion at the Victoria and Albert Museum London and Artistic Portfolio Congress, Lisbon in 2002, at the Stadt Museum for The Fashion Generation in Landeshauptstadt Düsseldorf in 2005 and Denim - Fabric of Our Lives , The Hub Museum, Lincolnshire, England, 2008.

Mobo's designs has been worn by the Queen of Morocco, the First Lady of the Philippines and celebrities such as Lea Seydoux, Rihanna, Florence Welch of "Florence and the Machine", Anne Hathaway, Lady Gaga, Madonna, The artist formerly known as Prince, Gwyneth Paltrow, Angelina Jolie, Sienna Miller, Kirsten Stewart, Christina Aguilera, Sharon Stone, Kristen Bell, Taylor Momsen, Nicole Richie, Meg Ryan, Isla Fisher, Amy Adams, Zoe Saldana, Natalie Imbruglia, Kristen Bell and The Kardashians.

Appearances of Mobo's works in books and publications include Fifty by Diesel, 1 Brief, 50 Designers, 50 Solutions in Fashion Design Spain, Generation Mode book by Stadt Museum Germany, ArtReview Magazine London, British Journal of Photography, Another Magazine, Exit Magazine, Dazed & Confused magazine, i-d magazine, Self-Service Magazine Paris, Jalouse Paris, Elle Germany, Vogue Italia, Vogue Australia, Vogue Portugal, Vogue Spain, Vogue Japan, Teen Vogue USA, Studio Voice Japan, Crash Paris, Zoo Germany, Neo 2 Spain, Vanity Fair (magazine)|Vanity Fair Italy, Zink New York, Pig Magazine Italy, Muse, Lips Thailand, Crash Magazine Paris, Flux, Maxi Germany, Elle Netherlands, Glamour Italy, La Repubblica, Il Sole 24 Ore, Citizen K, Le Vif Express, Purple magazine, and The Times, The Guardian, The Independent and The Sunday Telegraph newspapers in the UK.
