= Signal Village National High School =

Public high school in Taguig, Philippines

Location
- Taguig, Metro Manila; Philippines; 14°30′44″N 121°03′29″E

Information
- Established: 1976
- Budget: ▲ ₱232.5 million (2025)

Signal Village National High School (SVNHS) is a public high school which is situated in Taguig, Metro Manila, Philippines. It is a DepED Managed urban Secondary Public School located in Taguig, NCR Fourth District. It is one of the biggest school in the city.

== History ==
Signal Village National High School was established in June 1976 by Fort Bonifacio High School (FBHS) Signal ANNEX under Teacher-In-Charge, Clarita B. Manalili with only eight teachers and 175 students.

In 1977, Aida A. Contreras took over as Head Teacher (OIC). She herself together with the parents, teachers and the Signal Village community, improved and developed the needed school facilities like library, canteen and additional classrooms. She retired in June 1994.

Juanita De Vera became the Officer-In-Charge (OIC) when the previous HT/OIC vacated the position because of her retirement. With the help of the teachers, parents and the Philippine Marine residents surrounding the Signal Village area/community the FBHS Signal Annex was gradually improved and developed.

Years passed, Aquilina S. Rivas Division, Schools Division Superintendent of Muntinlupa, Taguig and Pateros (MUNTAPAT) urged and helped the OIC De Vera to separate FBHS Signal Annex since FBHS is located at Makati to Signal Village National High School because of its location which is under Taguig. It was approved by the Secretary of Education Ricardo Gloria with the support of Cong. Dante Tinga as the representative of Taguig – Pateros district then.

Republic Act 8039, an act converting Fort Bonifacio High School Signal Annex into an independent Signal Village National High School was finalized on June 15, 1995. Juanita S. De Vera in retired in 2003. Domingo G. Manimtim replaced the principal retired in 2003. The number of students served by the school rose from 175 students in 1976 to 5821 while the number of teachers became 95 with an increase of 87 teachers.

In August 2007, Diosdado Macapagal High School Signal Annex was established by Manimtim because of its increasing students population. His compulsory retirement at 65 in October 2009 that SVNHS needs a new school administrator/manager.

In January 2010, Eleanor F. Abisado succeeded Manimtim. The student population of 5821 was raised to 9250 students in general including the school Annex. At this time it is considered the biggest high school in the Division of Taguig – Pateros (TAPAT) Taguig City. The school management acquired additional school buildings from both local and national government. The Department of Education (DepEd) ICT project /program which was spearheaded by Signal Village National High School. It as accepted DepEd's primary donation of 150 computer units for its priority project, the iCT. In 2011, the school offers Technical/Vocational courses through Senator Rene Cayetano Companero (SRCC) technological skills based from (TESDA) which was initiated by Senator Alan Peter Cayetano. Catering all interested parents, drop-out students and Signal Village National High School (SVNHS) students.

Following the death of Eleanor Abisado in January 2014, Education Program Supervisor Arlie I Belaro was appointed as Officer-In-Charge.

Last June 2019, the public school boasted its new building with 21 fully air-conditioned classrooms, cyberlaboratory with 26 iMac computers and a “Hope Center” for 24/7 counseling.

== See also ==
- List of schools in Taguig
