= 2020 Philippine census =

Instance of national census

2020 Census of Population and Housing
- September 1, 2020 (start date)
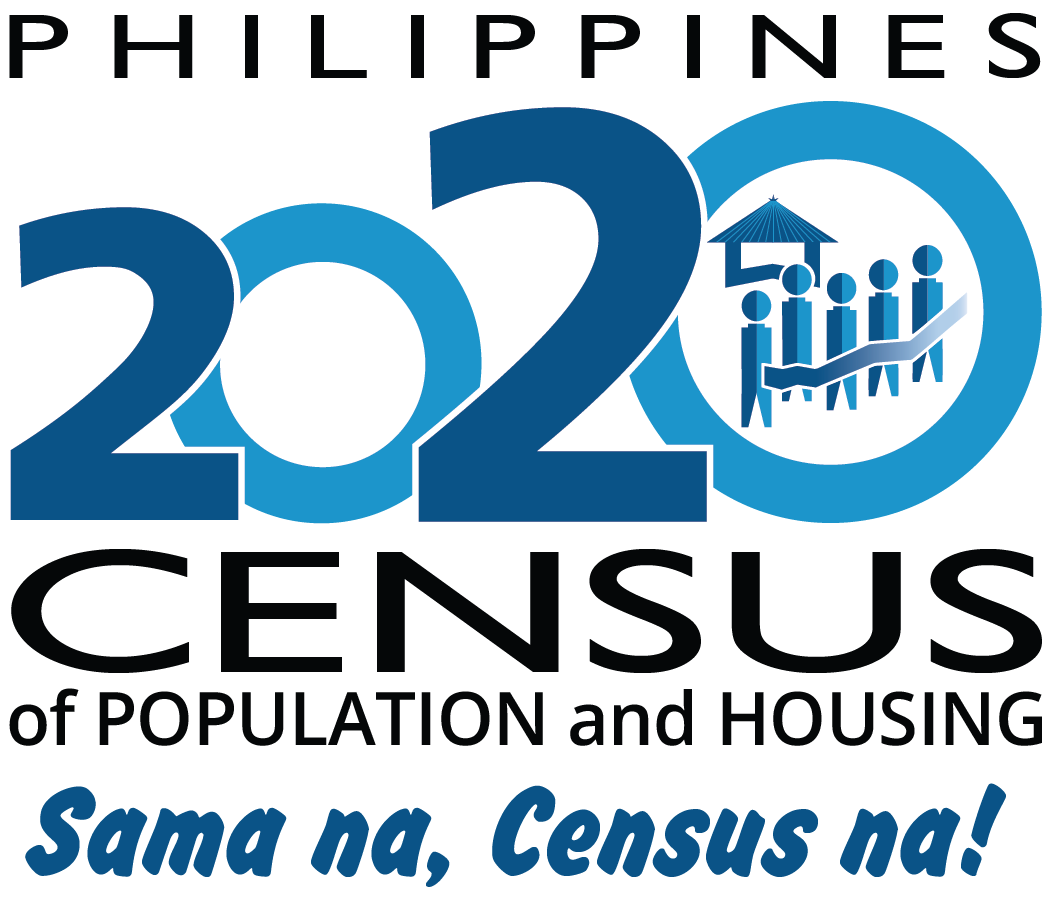
- Logo

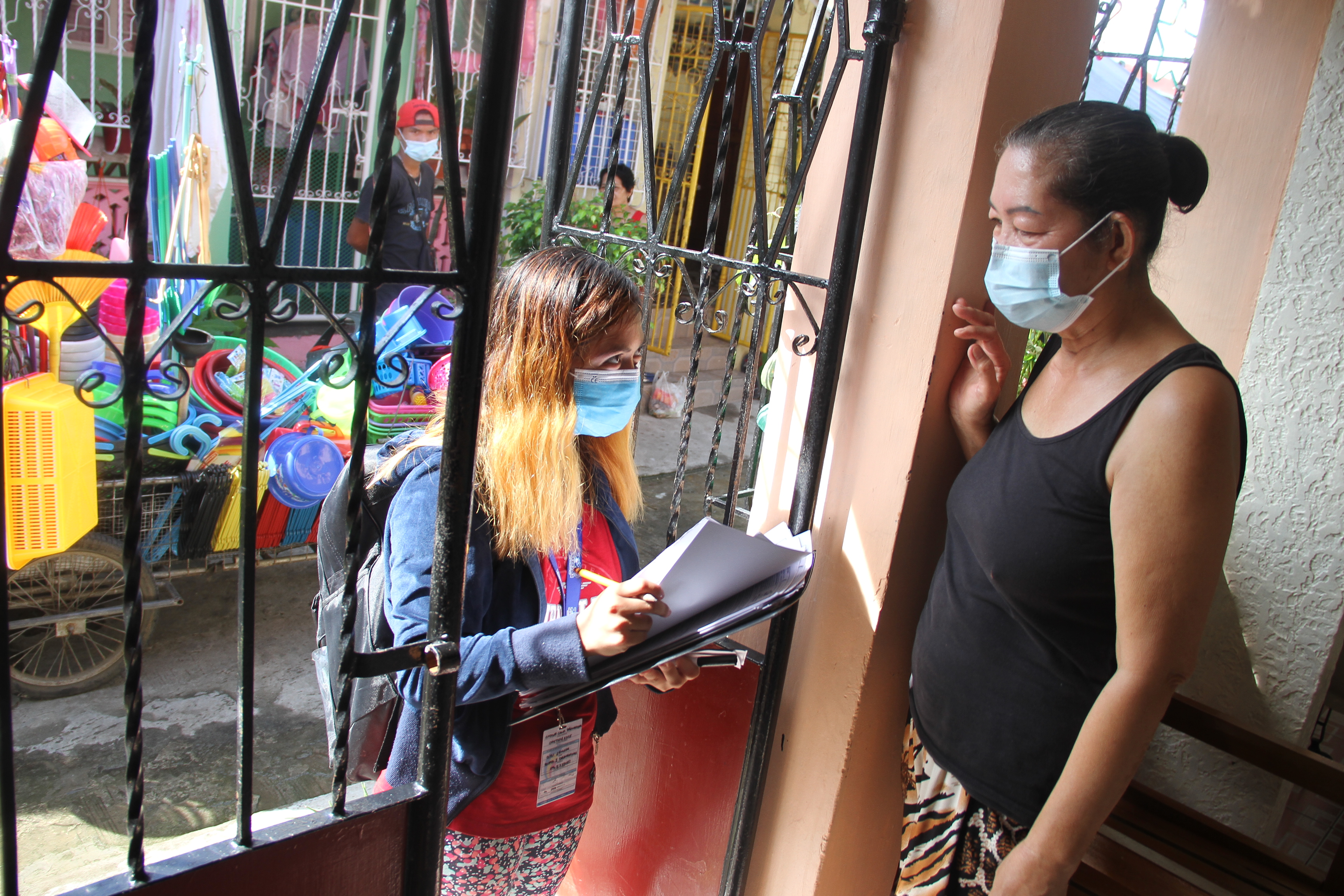
- A census enumerator interviewing a resident of Dasmariñas in October 2020 during the COVID-19 pandemic in the Philippines

General information
- Country: Philippines
- Topics: Census topics: People and population; Families and living arrangements; Employment; Housing
- Trial census: May 20 – June 17, 2019
- Authority: Philippine Statistics Authority
- Website: psa.gov.ph

Results
- Total population: 109,033,245 (▲1.63%)
- Most populous province: Cavite (4.34 million)
- Least populous province: Batanes (18,831)

The 2020 Census of Population and Housing (CPH) was the fifteenth census in the Philippines and the second census conducted by the Philippine Statistics Authority (PSA).

== Pilot run ==
The Philippine Statistics Authority (PSA) conducted a pilot run of the census from May 20 to June 17, 2019, covering eight areas. A new computer-aided system was tested, with PSA personnel to use an electronic questionnaire through digital tablets.

== Postponement ==
The census was originally scheduled to start on May 4, 2020. The conduct of the census was postponed due to the COVID-19 pandemic. The census was planned to be held sometime after the lifting of the enhanced community quarantine in Luzon which was imposed as a response to the health crisis. The start of census was then rescheduled for September 2020.

== Collection ==
=== Methods ===
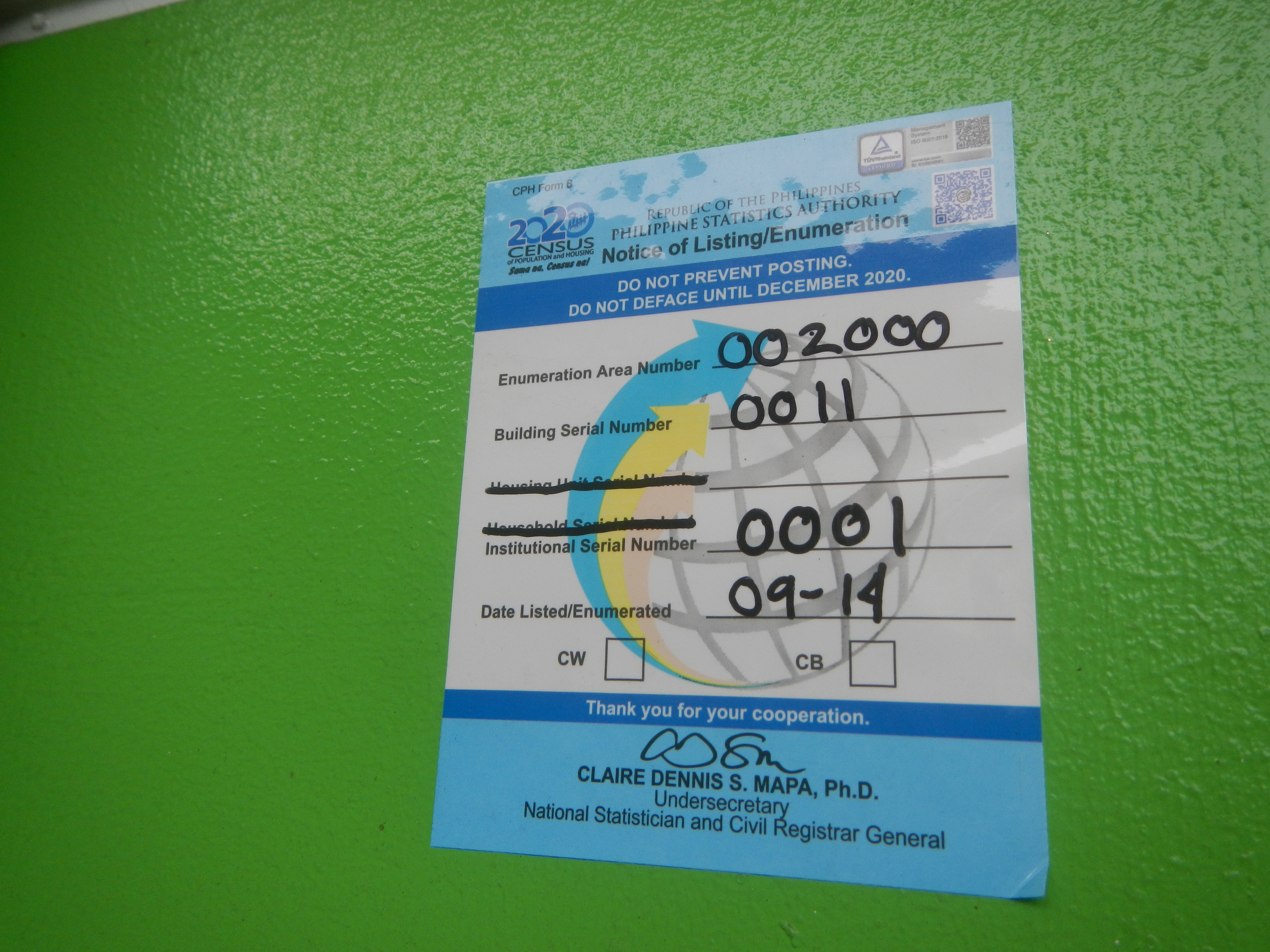
Sticker posted in a residence of a household which was already visited by an enumerator.

Census form

The PSA used various methods for the conduct of the 2020 census namely:

- Online census – with participants to be contacted through email and given access numbers
- Face-to-face interview by enumerators – with the dissemination of the survey either through pen and paper or computer tablets
- Scheduled phone interviews
- Self-filling of questionnaire to be collected by an enumerator

The conduct of the census through online means was limited due to many households in the country's rural areas has no access to internet infrastructure. The online census covered 2,000 households – mostly with members affiliated with the PSA and other government agencies.

All persons to be enumerated as members of a household or as residents of an institutional living quarter were those alive as of 12:01 a.m. of May 1, 2020

The 2020 census coincided with the rollout of the PhilSys national ID program but the PSA could not legally collect data from the national ID system for the census.

=== Enumerators and supervisors ===
The PSA hired 140,000 people to serve as data enumerators and census supervisors for the 2020 census. Due to the COVID-19 pandemic, they were required to wear face masks and shields and observe social distancing when conducting the census as precaution against COVID-19. Prior to the postponement of the census due to the COVID-19 pandemic, the PSA planned to employ public school teachers for the conduct of the census. Such plans were abandoned after the opening of classes in public schools was postponed to October due to the pandemic.

== Results ==
President Rodrigo Duterte through Proclamation No. 1179 stated that the population of the Philippines as of May 1, 2020 was 109,033,245. Pursuant to Batas Pambansa No. 72, the population count gathered from the 2020 census was made official upon proclamation of the results by the president. From 2015 to 2020, the Philippines' population increased by 1.63% which is lower than the 1.72% growth rate recorded in the 2010 to 2015 period.

Calabarzon was determined to be the most populated region as of 2020 with 16.20 million people. The most populated province was found to be Cavite (4.34 million) and the least populated being Batanes (18,831). Quezon City is the most populated local government unit.

The Commission on Population and Development (Popcom) maintained that the Philippines could achieve a stable replacement rate by 2025 following the confirmation of the census results.

=== City rankings ===
City	Region	2020 census	2010 census	Change
Quezon City	National Capital Region	2,960,048	2,761,720	+7.18%
Manila	National Capital Region	1,846,513	1,652,171	+11.76%
Davao City	Davao Region	1,776,949	1,449,296	+22.61%
Caloocan	National Capital Region	1,661,584	1,489,040	+11.59%
Zamboanga City	Zamboanga Peninsula	977,234	807,129	+21.08%
Cebu City	Central Visayas	964,169	866,171	+11.31%
Antipolo	Calabarzon	887,399	677,741	+30.93%
Taguig	National Capital Region	886,722	644,473	+37.59%
Pasig	National Capital Region	803,159	669,773	+19.92%
Cagayan de Oro	Northern Mindanao	728,402	602,088	+20.98%

== Application ==
The Bangsamoro regional government plans to use the result of the 2020 census as basis for the possible establishment new towns to be created from its Special Geographic Area, which consists of 63 barangays that are part of the region in Cotabato province.

== See also ==
- Population and housing censuses by country
