= Marikina Valley fault system =

Fault along Metro Manila and surrounding areas

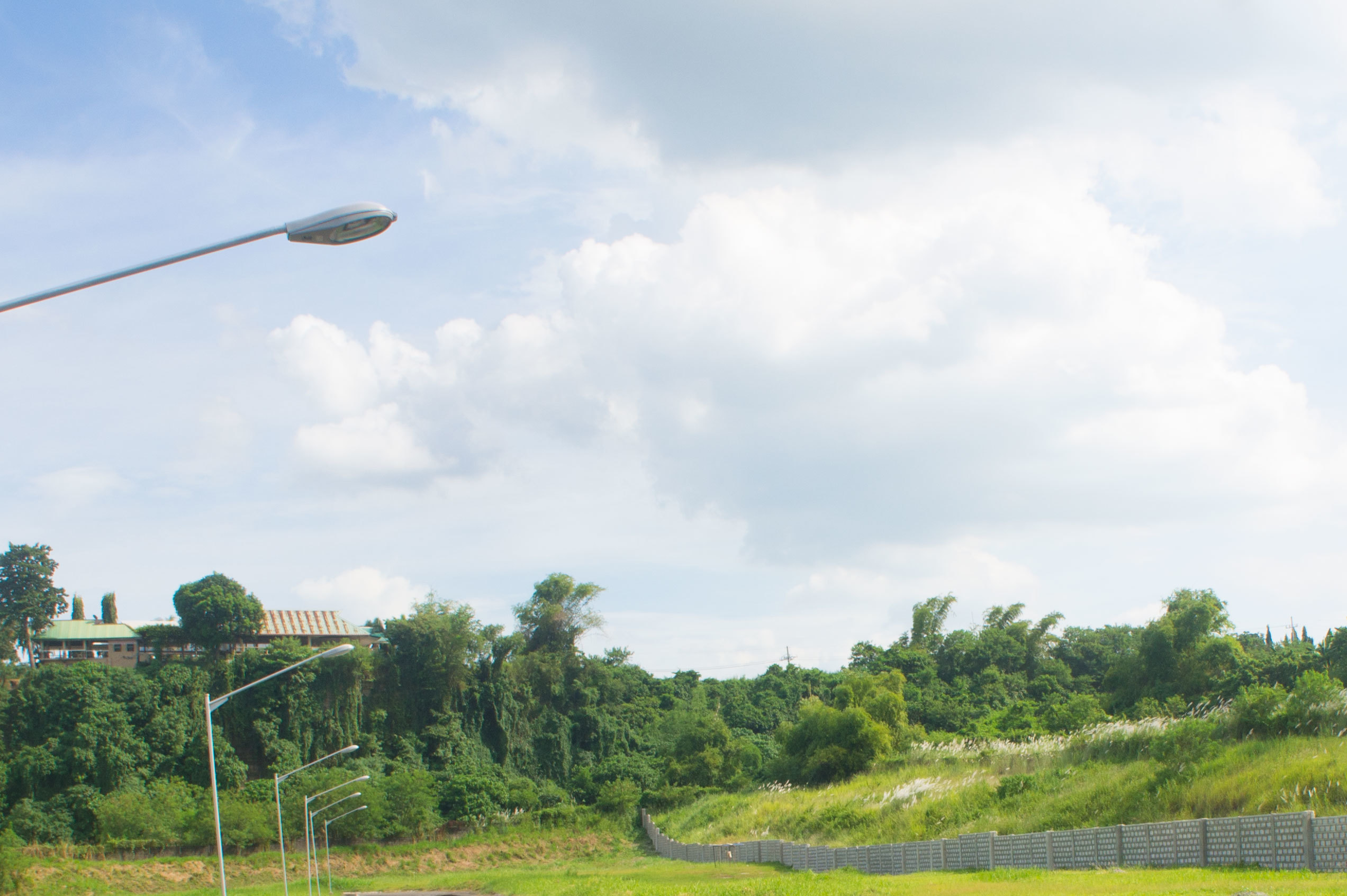
- Lower and upper fault plain along the West Valley Fault in Carmona, Cavite

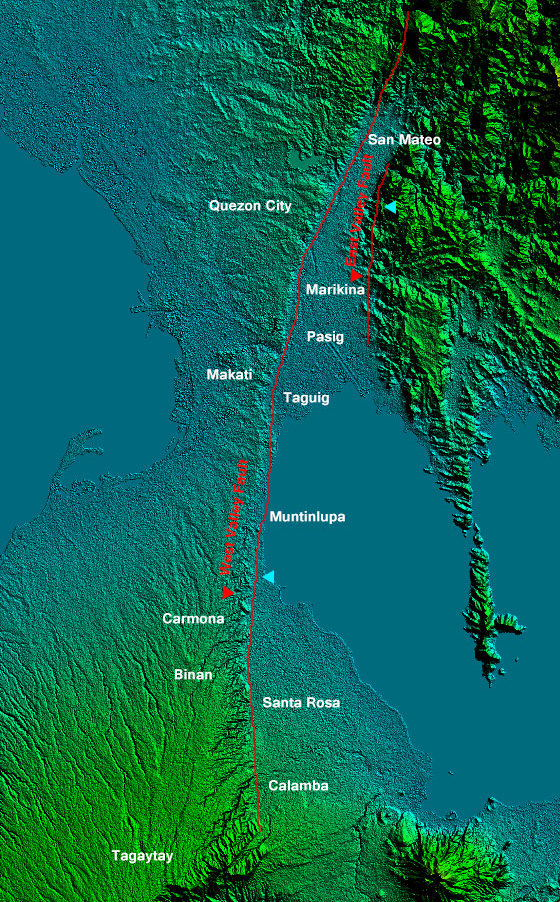
- Map of the Marikina Valley fault system, showing relative motion and deformation
- Etymology: Marikina
- Named by: Philippine Institute of Volcanology and Seismology
- Year defined: 2010
- Coordinates: 14°38′N 121°5′E
- Country: Philippines
- Region: Central Luzon, Metro Manila, Calabarzon
- Cities: West: Marikina, Quezon City, Pasig, Taguig, Muntinlupa, General Mariano Alvarez, Carmona, Silang, San Pedro, Biñan, Santa Rosa, Cabuyao, Calamba; East: Rodriguez, San Mateo

Characteristics
- Segments: West Valley Fault, East Valley Fault
- Length: 146 km (91 mi)
- Displacement: 10–12 mm (0.39–0.47 in)/yr

Tectonics
- Plate: Philippine Sea plate and Sunda plate
- Status: Active
- Earthquakes: 1658, 1771
- Type: Strike-slip fault
- Movement: Dextral
- Age: Gelasian
- Orogeny: Luzon-Mindoro-Palawan Orogeny
- Volcanic arc/belt: Macolod Corridor

The Marikina Valley fault system, also known as the Valley fault system (VFS), is a dominantly right-lateral strike-slip fault system in Luzon, Philippines. It extends from Doña Remedios Trinidad, Bulacan in the north, running through the provinces of Rizal, the Metro Manila cities of Quezon, Marikina, Pasig, Taguig and Muntinlupa, and the provinces of Cavite and Laguna, before ending in Canlubang in the south.

== Fault segments ==
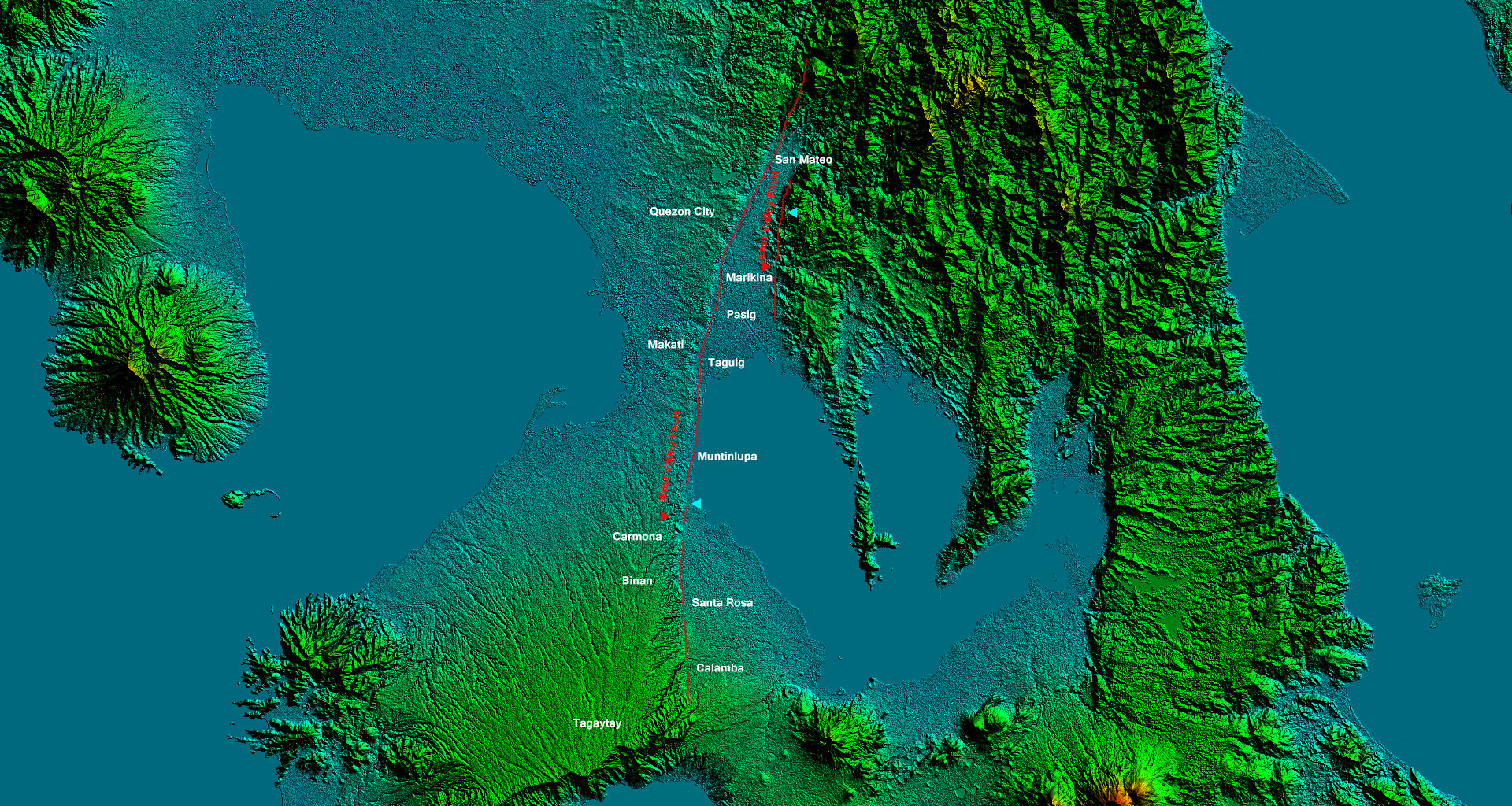
Relief map of Metro Manila and nearby provinces showing the surface traces of the West and East Valley Faults

The fault contains two major segments: the West Valley Fault (WVF) and the East Valley Fault (EVF).

West Valley Fault

The western segment, known as the West Valley Fault (WVF), is one of the two major fault segments of the Valley Fault System, which runs through the cities of Marikina, Quezon City, Pasig, Taguig and Muntinlupa in Metro Manila and moves in a dominantly dextral strike-slip motion. The West Valley Fault segment extends from Doña Remedios Trinidad to Calamba and is 129.47 kilometers (80.45 mi) long.

The West Valley Fault is capable of producing large-scale earthquakes during its active phases with a magnitude of 7 or higher.

East Valley Fault

The eastern segment, known as the East Valley Fault (EVF), moves in an oblique dextral motion. It extends about 17.24 kilometers (10.71 mi) from Rodriguez to San Mateo in the province of Rizal.

== Threat ==
Based on kinematic block models that utilize GPS, actual fault geometry, and earthquake focal mechanisms, the western segment of the Marikina Valley fault system was resolved to be almost fully locked, meaning it is currently accumulating and loading elastic strain at a rate of 10 to 12 mm/yr. The fault poses a threat of a large-scale earthquake with an estimated magnitude between 6–7 and as high as 7.6 to Metro Manila and surrounding provinces, with a death toll predicted to be as high as 35,000 and some 120,000 or higher injured and more than three million needed to be evacuated.

There are 99 private villages and subdivisions inside 80 barangays traversed directly by the fault, and it endangers 6,331 buildings in a span of 2,964.10 square kilometers (1,144.45 sq mi), where the majority are houses with 19 schools included in the list.
