= 2024 Philippine census =

Sixteenth census of the Philippines

2024 Census of Population
- July 15, 2024 (start date)

General information
- Country: Philippines
- Topics: Census topics: People and population; Families and living arrangements; Employment; Housing
- Authority: Philippine Statistics Authority
- Website: psa.gov.ph

Results
- Total population: 112,729,484 (▲0.80%)
- Most populous region: Calabarzon (16,933,234)
- Least populous region: Cordillera Administrative Region (1,808,985)

The 2024 Census of Population (POPCEN) was the sixteenth census in the Philippines and the third census conducted by the Philippine Statistics Authority (PSA).

== Off-cycle decision ==
Sticker posted in a residence of a household which was already visited by an enumerator.

The Philippine Statistics Authority conducted the Census of Population in 2024 instead of its original 2025 mid-decade schedule primarily to integrate it with the Community-Based Monitoring System (CBMS) as per order of President Bongbong Marcos. It is intended to update the list of beneficiaries of the government's social protection programs.

== Results ==
President Bongbong Marcos through Proclamation No. 973 stated that the population of the Philippines as of July 1, 2024 was 112,729,484. Pursuant to Batas Pambansa No. 72, the population count gathered from the 2024 census was made official upon proclamation of the results by the president. From 2020 to 2024, the Philippines' population increased by 0.8% which was lower than the 1.63% growth rate recorded in the 2015 to 2020 period.

=== Ten most populous cities in the Philippines ===
City	Region	2024 census	2020 census	Change
Quezon City	National Capital Region	3,084,270	2,960,048	+4.20%
Manila	National Capital Region	1,902,590	1,846,513	+3.04%
Davao City	Davao Region	1,848,947	1,776,949	+4.05%
Caloocan	National Capital Region	1,712,945	1,661,584	+3.09%
Taguig	National Capital Region	1,308,085	886,722	+47.52%
Zamboanga City	Zamboanga Peninsula	1,018,849	977,234	+4.26%
Cebu City	Central Visayas	965,332	964,169	+0.12%
Antipolo	Calabarzon	913,712	887,399	+2.97%
Pasig	National Capital Region	853,050	803,159	+6.21%
Dasmariñas	Calabarzon	744,511	703,141	+5.88%

== See also ==
- Population and housing censuses by country
