= Legislative districts of Taguig =

Philippine legislative districts

The legislative districts of Taguig are the representations of the highly urbanized city of Taguig in the Congress of the Philippines. The city is currently represented in the lower house of the Congress through its lone congressional district.

== History ==
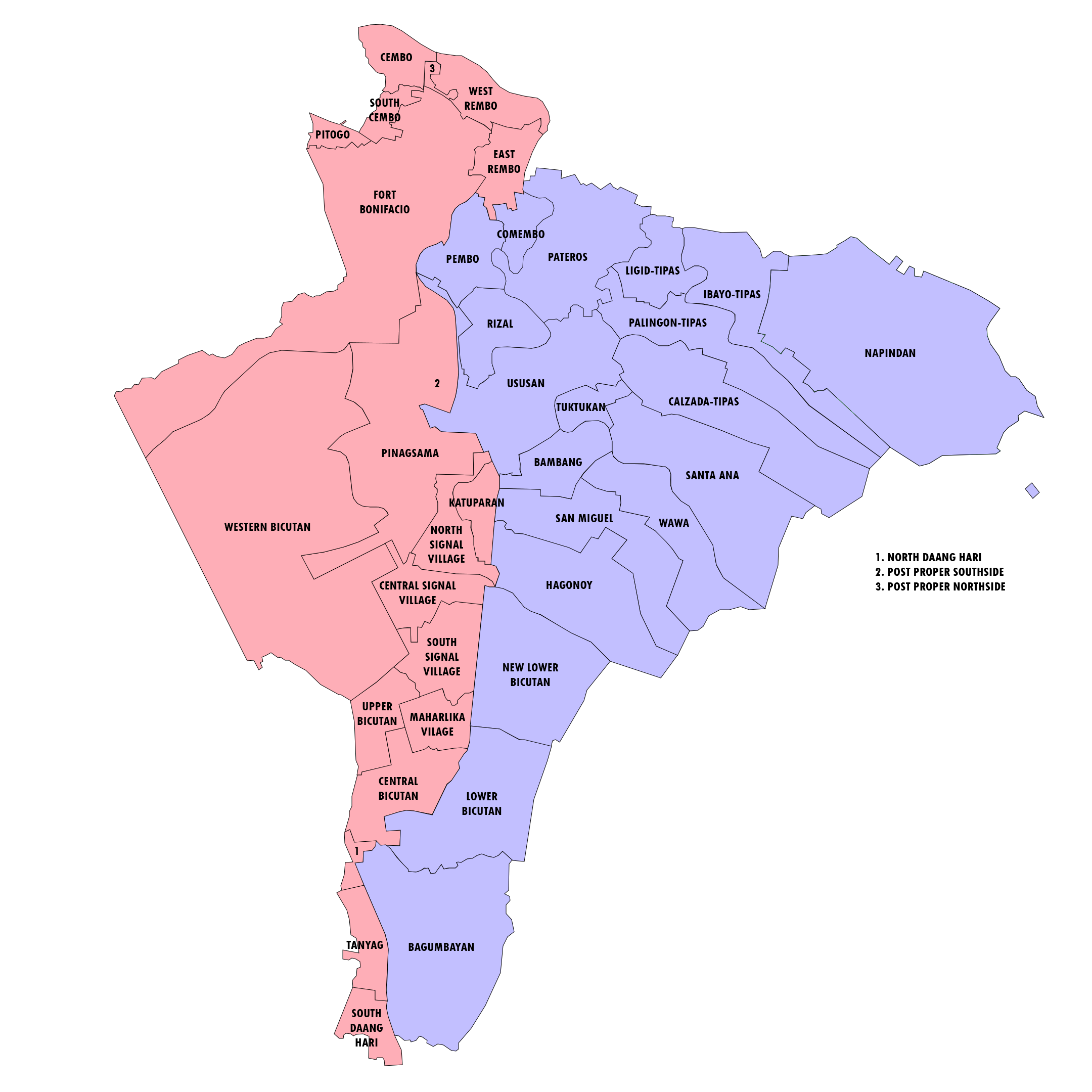
Legislative districts of the combined representation of Taguig–Pateros First District Second District

Areas now under the jurisdiction of Taguig was initially represented as part of the at-large district of the province of Manila in the Malolos Congress from 1898 to 1899.

The then-town was later incorporated to the province of Rizal, established in 1901, and was represented as part of the first district of Rizal from 1907 to 1941 and from 1945 to 1972. During World War II, it was represented as part of the at-large district of Rizal in the National Assembly of the Second Philippine Republic from 1943 to 1944. Taguig was separated from Rizal on November 7, 1975 by virtue of Presidential Decree No. 824, and was represented in the Interim Batasang Pambansa along with other Metropolitan Manila municipalities and cities as part of Region IV from 1978 to 1984.

Taguig, still a municipality then, was grouped with Muntinlupa and Pateros to form a single parliamentary district which returned one representative to the Regular Batasang Pambansa in 1984. The municipality was grouped with Pateros again to form one congressional district under the new Constitution proclaimed on February 11, 1987; it elected its member to the restored House of Representatives starting that same year.

The western area of Taguig, coterminous with the Second Councilor District of Taguig (for the purpose of electing municipal, now city, council members), was separated from the congressional district of Pateros–Taguig by virtue of Republic Act No. 8487, the law which converted Taguig into a highly urbanized city. Despite being enacted by Congress on February 11, 1998, the said law only took effect on December 8, 2004 after the Commission on Elections issued a resolution confirming that the affirmative votes for cityhood prevailed in the ballot recount. This new district elected its first separate representative in 2007.

There was a boundary dispute over which city has jurisdiction over lands encompassed within the former Fort McKinley U.S. Military Reservation (now Fort Bonifacio and its surrounding areas). Portions of four of Taguig's barangays (Fort Bonifacio, Pinagsama, Western Bicutan, and Ususan) were claimed by the neighboring city of Makati as part of its own two barangays (Post Proper Northside and Post Proper Southside). Residents of areas where Taguig exercise de facto control vote as part of this congressional district except for areas under barangay Ususan (part of Taguig's 1st district), while residents of areas where Makati exercises de facto control vote as part of its second congressional district.

== Current districts ==
Nacionalista (1)

Legislative Districts and Congressional Representatives of Taguig City
District	Current Representative	Barangays	Population (2015)	Map
Taguig (2nd District)	Jorge Daniel S. Bocobo (since 2025); Fort Bonifacio	List: Cembo; Central Bicutan; Central Signal Village; East Rembo; Fort Bonifacio; Katuparan; Maharlika Village; North Daang Hari; North Signal Village; Pinagsama; Pitogo; Post Proper Northside; Post Proper Southside; South Cembo; South Daang Hari; South Signal Village; Tanyag; Upper Bicutan; Western Bicutan; West Rembo	440,815	

== Historical districts and representatives ==
=== 1987–2007 ===
Period	Representative	Constituents
8th Congress; 1987–1992	Dante Tiñga	Pateros, Taguig (became city 2004)
9th Congress; 1992–1995	Dante Tiñga	Pateros, Taguig (became city 2004)
10th Congress; 1995–1998	Dante Tiñga	Pateros, Taguig (became city 2004)
11th Congress; 1998–2001	Alan Peter Cayetano	Pateros, Taguig (became city 2004)
12th Congress; 2001–2004	Alan Peter Cayetano	Pateros, Taguig (became city 2004)
13th Congress; 2004–2007	Alan Peter Cayetano	Pateros, Taguig (became city 2004)

== See also ==
- Legislative district of Pateros–Taguig
