= Taguig–Pateros's 2nd congressional district =

Legislative district of the Philippines

- Constituency for the House of Representatives of the Philippines
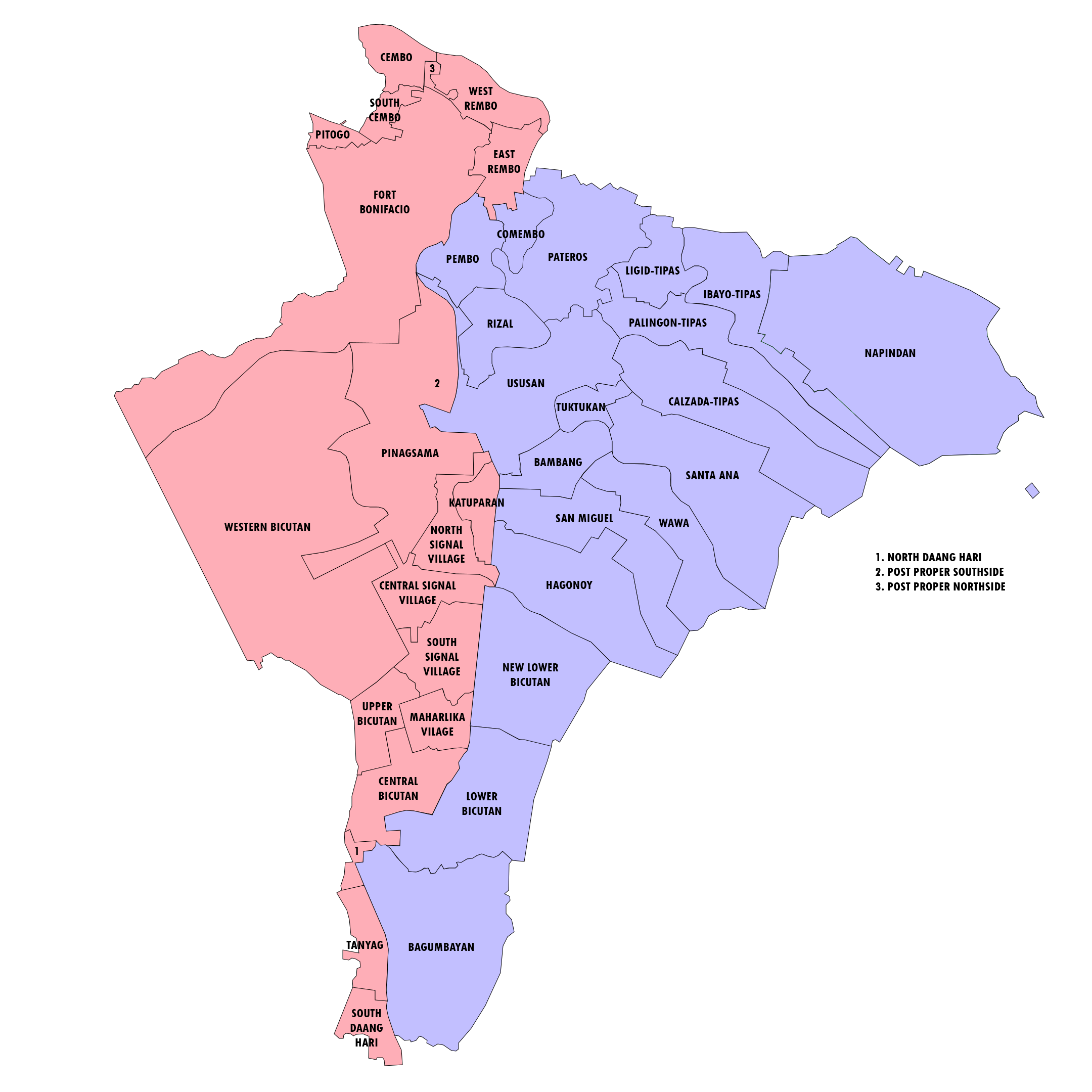
- Territory of the 2nd legislative district of Taguig (in red)

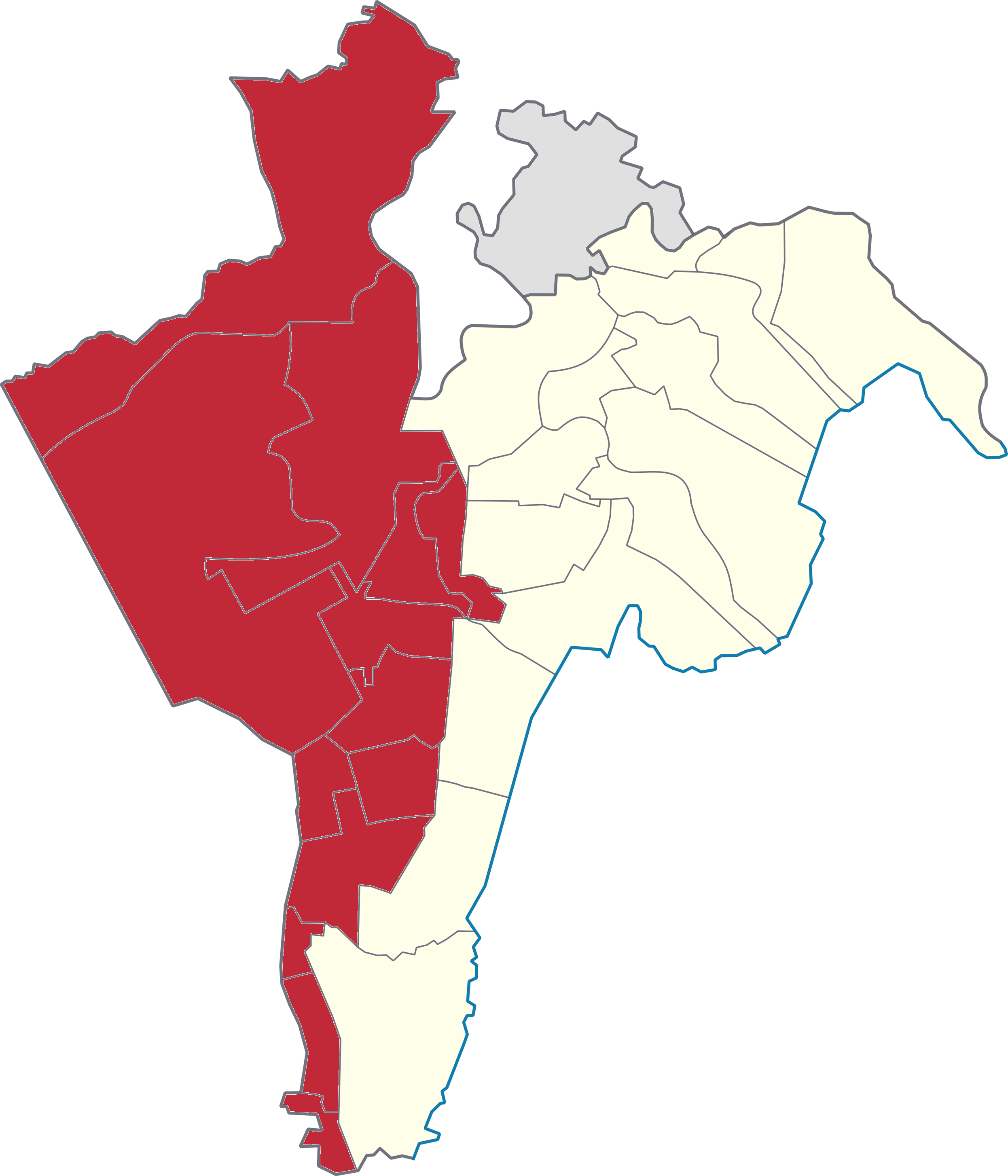
- Defunct boundary of Taguig–Pateros's 2nd congressional district (2008–2024)

- City: Taguig
- Region: Metro Manila
- Population: 739,502 (2024)
- Electorate: 307,232 (2025)
- Major settlements: 20 barangays: Cembo; Central Bicutan; Central Signal Village; East Rembo; Fort Bonifacio; Katuparan; Maharlika Village; North Daang Hari; North Signal Village; Pinagsama; Pitogo; Post Proper Northside; Post Proper Southside; South Cembo; South Daang Hari; South Signal Village; Tanyag; Upper Bicutan; West Rembo; Western Bicutan
- Area: 25.17 km^{2} (9.72 sq mi)

Current constituency
- Created: 2004
- Representative: Jorge Daniel Bocobo
- Political party: Nacionalista
- Congressional bloc: Majority

Taguig–Pateros's 2nd congressional district (also known simply as Taguig's 2nd congressional district and Taguig's lone congressional district) is one of the two congressional districts of the Philippines in the combined independent local government units of Pateros and Taguig. The district is located entirely within the city of Taguig. It has been represented in the House of Representatives of the Philippines since 2007. The district was created in 2004 following a plebiscite to ratify Republic Act No. 8487 or the 1998 Taguig City Charter. It consists of the western Taguig barangays of Cembo, Central Bicutan, Central Signal Village, East Rembo, Fort Bonifacio, Katuparan, Maharlika Village, North Daang Hari, North Signal Village, Pinagsama, Pitogo, Post Proper Northside, Post Proper Southside, South Cembo, South Daang Hari, South Signal Village, Tanyag, Upper Bicutan, Western Bicutan, and West Rembo. The district is currently represented in the 20th Congress by Jorge Daniel Bocobo of the Nacionalista Party (NP).

== Representation history ==
#	Image	Member	Term of office		Congress	Party	Electoral history	Constituent LGUs
#	Image	Member	Start	End	Congress	Party	Electoral history	Constituent LGUs
=== Taguig–Pateros's 2nd district for the House of Representatives of the Philippines ===
District created December 8, 2004 from Taguig–Pateros's at-large district.
1		Henry Dueñas Jr.	June 30, 2007	February 28, 2010	14th	Lakas (KDT)	Elected in 2007. Removed from office after an electoral protest.	2007–2008; Bagong Tanyag, Maharlika Village, Signal Village, Upper Bicutan, Western Bicutan
1		Henry Dueñas Jr.	June 30, 2007	February 28, 2010	14th	Lakas (KDT)	Elected in 2007. Removed from office after an electoral protest.	2008–2024; Central Bicutan, Central Signal Village, Fort Bonifacio, Katuparan, Maharlika Village, North Daang Hari, North Signal Village, Pinagsama, South Daang Hari, South Signal Village, Tanyag, Upper Bicutan, Western Bicutan
2		Angelito Reyes	February 28, 2010	June 30, 2010	14th	Lingkod Taguig	Declared winner of 2007 elections.	2008–2024; Central Bicutan, Central Signal Village, Fort Bonifacio, Katuparan, Maharlika Village, North Daang Hari, North Signal Village, Pinagsama, South Daang Hari, South Signal Village, Tanyag, Upper Bicutan, Western Bicutan
3		Sigfrido Tiñga	June 30, 2010	June 30, 2013	15th	Liberal (KDT)	Elected in 2010.	2008–2024; Central Bicutan, Central Signal Village, Fort Bonifacio, Katuparan, Maharlika Village, North Daang Hari, North Signal Village, Pinagsama, South Daang Hari, South Signal Village, Tanyag, Upper Bicutan, Western Bicutan
4		Lino Cayetano	June 30, 2013	June 30, 2016	16th	Nacionalista	Elected in 2013.	2008–2024; Central Bicutan, Central Signal Village, Fort Bonifacio, Katuparan, Maharlika Village, North Daang Hari, North Signal Village, Pinagsama, South Daang Hari, South Signal Village, Tanyag, Upper Bicutan, Western Bicutan
5		Pia Cayetano	June 30, 2016	June 30, 2019	17th	Nacionalista	Elected in 2016.	2008–2024; Central Bicutan, Central Signal Village, Fort Bonifacio, Katuparan, Maharlika Village, North Daang Hari, North Signal Village, Pinagsama, South Daang Hari, South Signal Village, Tanyag, Upper Bicutan, Western Bicutan
6		Lani Cayetano	June 30, 2019	June 30, 2022	18th	Nacionalista	Elected in 2019.	2008–2024; Central Bicutan, Central Signal Village, Fort Bonifacio, Katuparan, Maharlika Village, North Daang Hari, North Signal Village, Pinagsama, South Daang Hari, South Signal Village, Tanyag, Upper Bicutan, Western Bicutan
7		Amparo Maria Zamora	June 30, 2022	June 30, 2025	19th	Nacionalista	Elected in 2022.	2008–2024; Central Bicutan, Central Signal Village, Fort Bonifacio, Katuparan, Maharlika Village, North Daang Hari, North Signal Village, Pinagsama, South Daang Hari, South Signal Village, Tanyag, Upper Bicutan, Western Bicutan
7		Amparo Maria Zamora	June 30, 2022	June 30, 2025	19th	Lakas	Elected in 2022.	2024–present Cembo, Central Bicutan, Central Signal Village, East Rembo, Fort Bonifacio, Katuparan, Maharlika Village, North Daang Hari, North Signal Village, Pinagsama, Pitogo, Post Proper Northside, Post Proper Southside, South Cembo, South Daang Hari, South Signal Village, Tanyag, Upper Bicutan, Western Bicutan, West Rembo
8		Jorge Daniel Bocobo	June 30, 2025	Incumbent	20th	Nacionalista	Elected in 2025.	2024–present Cembo, Central Bicutan, Central Signal Village, East Rembo, Fort Bonifacio, Katuparan, Maharlika Village, North Daang Hari, North Signal Village, Pinagsama, Pitogo, Post Proper Northside, Post Proper Southside, South Cembo, South Daang Hari, South Signal Village, Tanyag, Upper Bicutan, Western Bicutan, West Rembo

== Election results ==
=== 2025 ===
2025 Second District Congressional Election
Candidate	Party	Votes	%
Jorge Daniel Bocobo	Nacionalista Party	144,014	53.62
Pammy Zamora (incumbent)	Lakas–CMD	116,489	43.37
Noe Manila	Independent	8,095	3.01
Total		268,598	100.00
Nacionalista Party gain from Lakas–CMD			

=== 2022 ===
2022 Philippine House of Representatives election in Taguig's Lone District
Party	Candidate	Votes	%
Nacionalista	Maria Amparo Zamora	121,179	68.75
PPP	Michelle Anne Gonzales	55,089	31.25
Total votes		176,268	100.00
Nacionalista hold			

=== 2019 ===
2019 Philippine House of Representatives election in Taguig's Lone District
Party	Candidate	Votes	%
Nacionalista	Ma. Laarni Cayetano	113,226	72.90
PDP–Laban	Michelle Anne Gonzales	42,012	27.10
Total votes		155,238	100.00
Nacionalista hold			

=== 2016 ===
2016 Philippine House of Representatives election in Taguig's Lone District
Party	Candidate	Votes	%
Nacionalista	Pia Cayetano	93,813	
UNA	Michelle Anne Gonzales	41,396	
Total votes		135,209	100.00
Nacionalista hold			

=== 2013 ===
Philippine House of Representative election at Taguig's 2nd District
Party	Candidate	Votes	%
Nacionalista	Lino Edgardo Cayetano	33,177	53.22
NPC	Henry Dueñas Jr.	26,238	42.02
Margin of victory		6,939	11.13%
Invalid or blank votes		2,930	4.70
Total votes		62,345	100.00
Nacionalista gain from Liberal			

=== 2010 ===
Philippine House of Representatives election at Taguig's 2nd district
Party	Candidate	Votes	%
Liberal	Sigfrido Tiñga	61,483	60.62
Lingkod Taguig	Angelito Reyes	16,990	16.75
Nacionalista	Arvin Ian Alit	16,184	15.96
Independent	James Layug	6,637	6.54
Independent	Robinson "Robin" Lumontod Jr.	135	0.13
Valid ballots		101,429	94.91
Invalid or blank votes		5,438	5.09
Total votes		106,867	100.00
Liberal gain from Lingkod Taguig			

== See also ==
- Legislative district of Taguig
