= Embo, Taguig =

Barangays in Taguig, Philippines

Embo
- Barangays
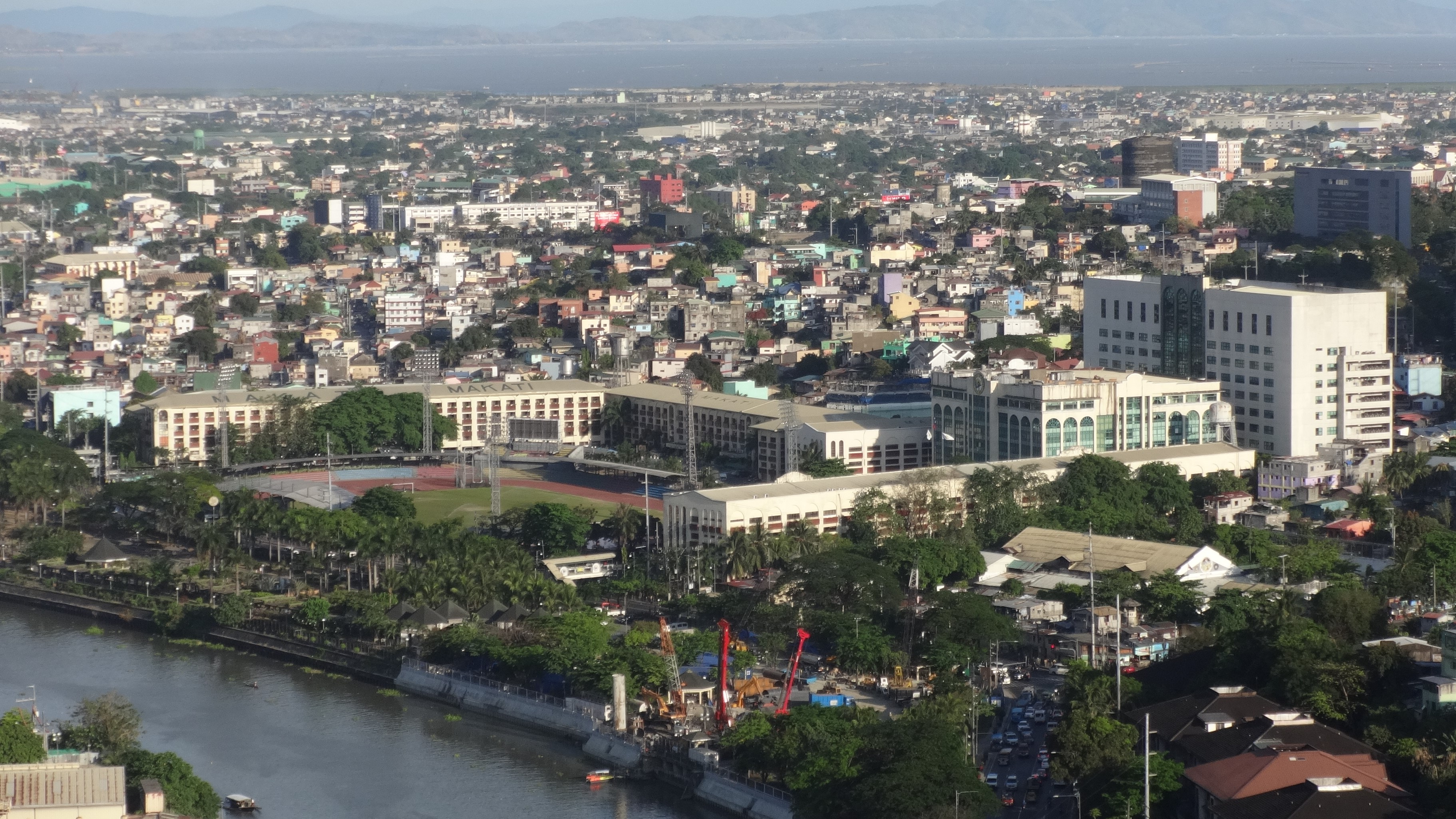
- Embo with University of Makati in the center
- Etymology: Enlisted Men's Barrio
- Map showing the Embo area. Faded portions of the Post Proper barangays overlap the territory already controlled by barangays Fort Bonifacio, Pinagsama, Ususan, and Western Bicutan.
- Country: Philippines
- Region: National Capital Region
- City: Taguig
- First military settlement: 1949 (Cembo)
- Transfer of control to Makati (de facto): January 7, 1986
- Transfer of control to Taguig (de jure): October 26, 2023

Area
  - Total: 8.838 km^{2} (3.412 sq mi)

Population (2024)
  - Total: 354,216

Divisions
  - Barangays: 10: Cembo; Comembo; East Rembo; Pembo; Pitogo; Post Proper Northside; Post Proper Southside; Rizal; South Cembo; West Rembo
- Time zone: UTC+8 (PST)
- ZIP code: 1640–1649; 1635 (Bonifacio Global City)
- Area code: 2

The Enlisted Men's Barrio, commonly known as Embo (stylized in all caps as EMBO), is a collective term for ten barangays in Taguig, Philippines. It is made up of barangays Cembo, Comembo, East Rembo, Pembo, Pitogo, Rizal, South Cembo and West Rembo, as well as the two Inner Fort barangays: Post Proper Northside and Post Proper Southside. The barangays were originally established to house military personnel of the Armed Forces of the Philippines (AFP).

The area was formerly disputed between the cities of Makati and Taguig, as well as the municipality of Pateros. Proclamation No. 2475 issued by President Ferdinand Marcos unlawfully transferred the jurisdiction of Fort Bonifacio and the Embo barangays to Makati, which was contested by Taguig because it altered the town’s boundaries without the plebiscite as prescribed by the Constitution. From 1986 to 2023, the barangays were under the jurisdiction of Makati. The Supreme Court ruled in favor of Taguig, and as of April 2023, the barangays were transferred from Makati to Taguig.

== Etymology ==
The barangays’ collective suffix "-embo" is a contraction of "enlisted men's barrios (EMBOs), as the area was initially a settlement for enlisted personnel of the Armed Forces of the Philippines.

== History ==
=== Early history ===
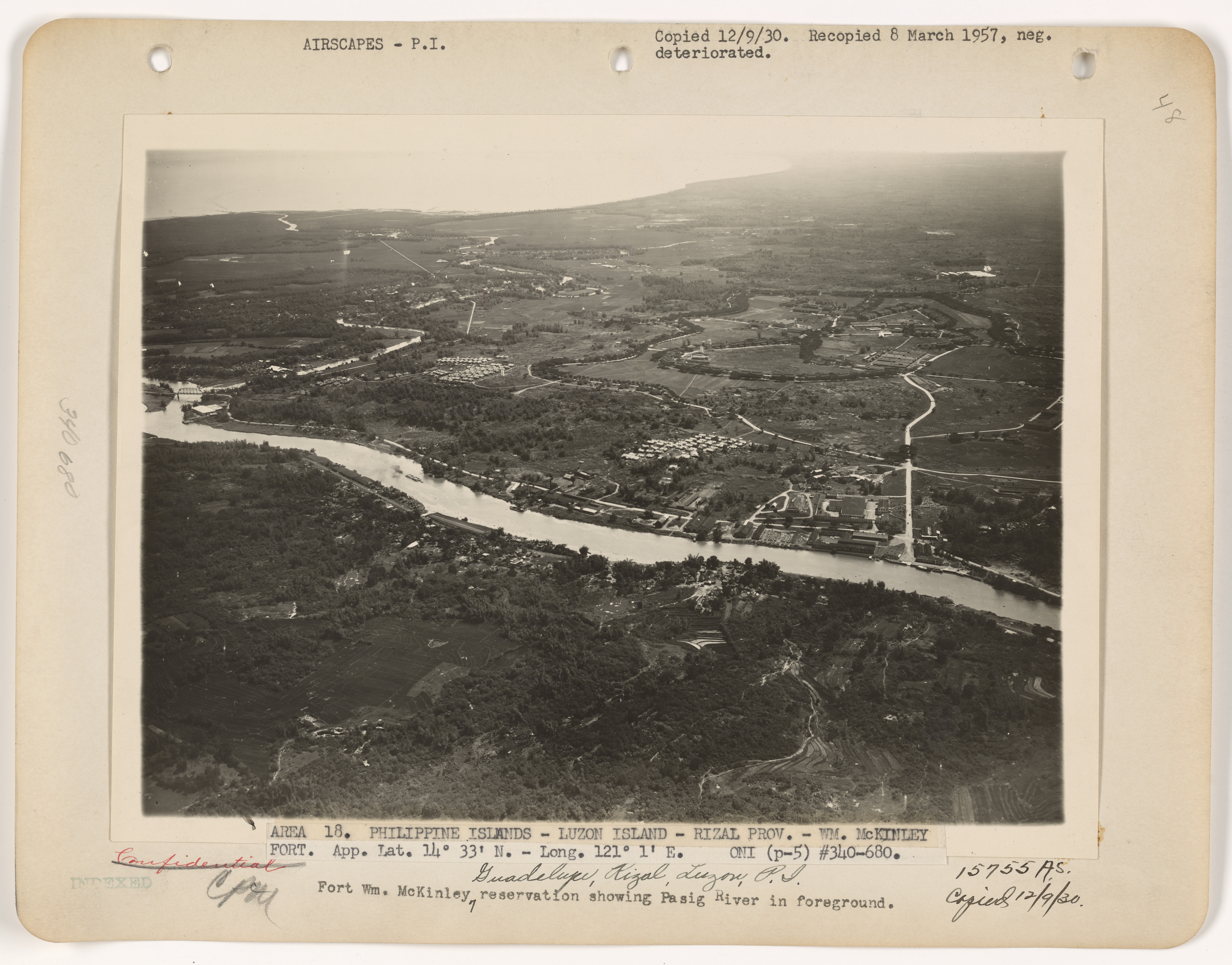
Fort William McKinley and surrounding areas, including the present-day Embo barangays, circa 1930s

Parts of the Embo area were formerly known as Mamancat, Masilang, San Nicolás, and Malapadnabato, all part of Pateros. Mamancat was known as a trading hub alongside its more developed neighbor, Aguho (now Barangay Agujo, Pateros) during the Spanish colonial era. San Nicolás, which comprises the present-day western portion of West Rembo, is the location of the Ermita de San Nicolás de Tolentino established in 1686, and is believed to be first settled by Chinese traders. Malapadnabato used to be linked to Pasig via an old bridge, while Masilang comprises present-day South Cembo. The two areas were later placed under the jurisdiction of San Pedro de Macati (modern Makati).

=== Establishment of EMBO settlements ===
At the end of the Philippine–American War, the United States colonial administration established Fort William McKinley at the center of present-day Metro Manila. During World War II, the military reservation served as headquarters for the United States Army Forces in the Far East (USAFFE) until the Imperial Japanese military takeover. After the end of the war, the Philippines would be granted full independence in July 1946 by the United States, which retained control over military bases in the country until 1991.

Fort McKinley would only be turned over to the Philippine government in 1949. The reservation was renamed Fort Bonifacio and the government made plans to create settlements for military personnel within the vicinity of the installation.

Cembo would be the first settlements among the EMBO barangays to be established, when the first batch of enlisted servicemen from the Infantry Group, Philippine Ground Force from Floridablanca, Pampanga arriving in 1949 to settle in the area. In 1954, East Rembo was established as settlements for Fort Bonifacio-based enlisted men serving in the armed forces upon the authorization of the Armed Forces of the Philippines through the office of General Alfonso Arellano, then-Commanding General of Fort Bonifacio.

In 1956, two more settlements would be authorized: West Rembo and Pitogo. In 1957, Comembo, in the site formerly known as Mamancat, would be settled by personnel from the Combat Engineering Group of the Philippine Army. In the same year, the area was reserved for military use.

On October 27, 1965, the area was declared "open to disposition under certain provisions" through Proclamation No. 481, which was issued by President Diosdado Macapagal. Pembo would be established to for personnel of the First Ranger Regiment, who were also known as the Panthers. In 1966, Cembo Annex was separated from Cembo proper and renamed South Cembo.

On December 11, 1972, two barangays inside the Fort Bonifacio military reservation were established, namely: Post Proper Northside and Post Proper Southside.

=== Transfer to Makati ===
On January 7, 1986, President Ferdinand Marcos issued Proclamation No. 2475, which transferred control of the Fort Bonifacio area to the municipal government of Makati and reserved the area for military personnel and their dependents. In 1990, President Corazon Aquino issued Proclamation No. 518 to award land titles in the EMBO area to bona fide occupants.

In February 1996, a new barangay named Rizal was created from Pembo through Makati City Ordinance No. 96-010. It was later ratified through a plebiscite held on June 29, 1996. Prior to the creation of Rizal, Pembo was larger than the municipality of Pateros, with a land area of 123 hectares (300 acres) and a population of 65,000 in 1995.

The Fort Bonifacio area and the Embo barangays would be subject of a territorial dispute between the city governments of Taguig and Makati. Taguig filed the case in 1993. In 2022, the Supreme Court ruled that Makati should stop exercising jurisdiction over the Embo barangays although the Makati city government has maintained that will continue to do so until it exhausts all legal remedies and Taguig secures a writ of execution from the Supreme Court.

=== Reintegration to Taguig ===
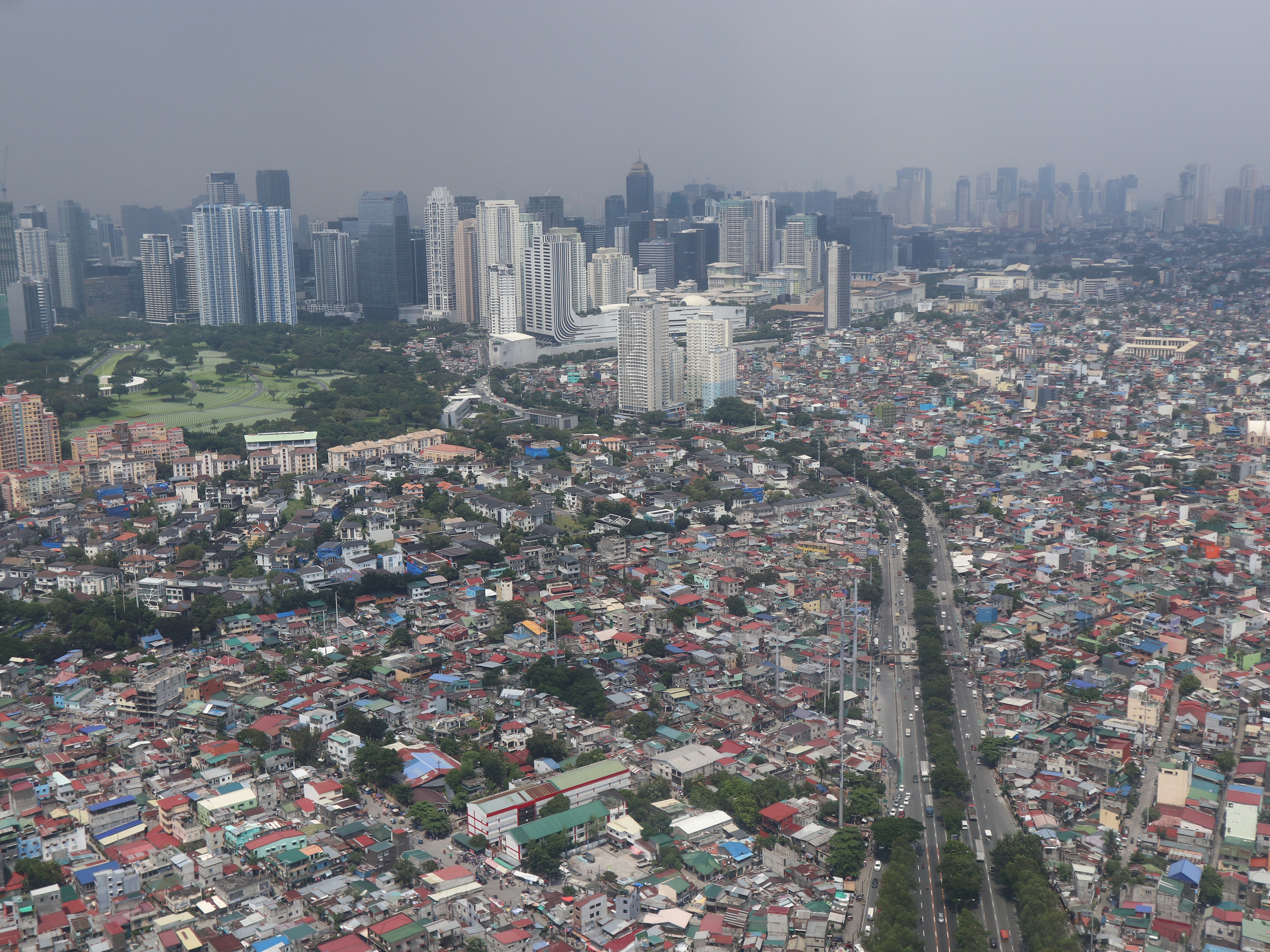
Aerial view of barangays East Rembo, Pembo, Rizal, Post Proper Northside, and Post Proper Southside, with Bonifacio Global City on the background, in October 2023

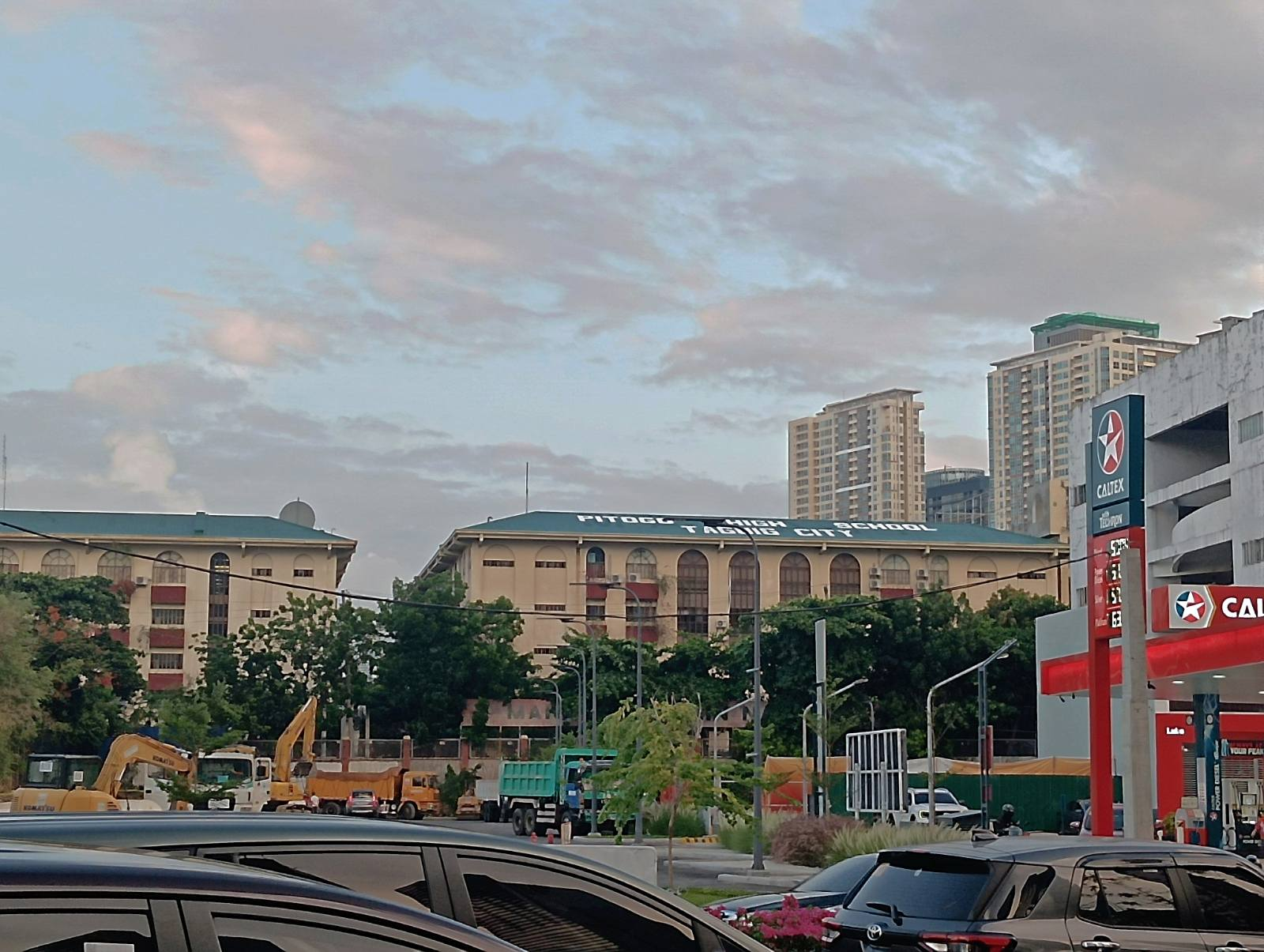
Barangay Pitogo as seen from Bonifacio Global City, with Pitogo High School now bearing the word "Taguig City" on its roof, emphasizing Taguig's possession and political jurisdiction over the barangay which was formerly part of Makati.

In April 2023, the Supreme Court of the Philippines has junked the motion for reconsideration that was filed by the City of Makati to override the court's earlier decision, siding with Taguig. The Taguig City Government released a statement "welcoming the new Taguigeños", referring to the residents of the affected Embo barangays, and that they would start working on the transition and handover of the Embo barangays. On the dispositive portion of the Supreme Court of the Philippines ruling on December 1, 2021, it reinstated the writ of preliminary injunction dated August 2, 1994 issued by the RTC of Pasig, which permanently prohibits the City of Makati from exercising jurisdiction over, making improvements on, or otherwise treating as part of its territory the Fort Bonifacio military reservation which includes all of the Embos. To comply with the Supreme Court's decision, the Department of the Interior and Local Government released a memo dated October 26, 2023 transferring the control of the Embo barangays from Makati to Taguig.

On June 28, 2024, the Commission on Elections (COMELEC) formally listed the Embo barangays to be under Taguig, thereby making them eligible to vote in the 2025 Taguig local elections, for mayor, vice mayor, and city council, but initially not for the congressman (district representative) position. Due to the disenfranchisement of Embo residents, the Taguig City Council passed Ordinance No. 144 on September 16, 2024, reallocating the barangays between Taguig’s two existing legislative districts. This process was followed by Senate and House Concurrent Resolutions and COMELEC Resolution No. 11069 dated September 25, officially allowing Embo residents vote for a congressman for Taguig.

In September 2024, the Department of Justice stated in a legal opinion that buildings and structures located in the EMBOs that were previously under control of Makati are under the jurisdiction of Taguig. The Justice Department gave its opinion in response to a query from Department of Health Secretary Teodoro Herbosa, who sought to determine whether the Supreme Court‘s 2023 ruling also transferred ownership of the buildings in the Embo barangays to Taguig.

On May 5, 2025, the Regional Trial Court of Taguig issued a Temporary Restraining Order (TRO) directing the City of Makati to immediately cease obstructing the City of Taguig's access to and exclusive full possession of EMBO public properties which covers health centers, covered courts, multi-purpose buildings, parks and other government properties covered by Proclamation Nos. 518 and 1916. The TRO effectively grants ownership of the public facilities to the City of Taguig and was in-effect for 72 hours. The courts granted a 17-day extension of the TRO on May 9. Later on, the RTC granted Taguig's prayer for preliminary injunction, which effectively retains Taguig's possession of the facilities for the continued public services for the Embo barangays.

== Barangays ==
Political map of Embo barangays. Lighter portions of the Post Proper barangays, previously claimed by Makati, overlap territory already controlled by Taguig's barangays Fort Bonifacio, Pinagsama, Ususan, and Western Bicutan.

The Embo barangays are constituted as barangays of Taguig. These barangays are divided between Taguig-Pateros' two legislative districts and were previously part of Makati's 2nd legislative district. The two Inner Fort barangays, namely Post Proper Northside and Post Proper Southside, as well as Pitogo and Rizal (formerly part of Pembo) are also grouped with other barangays with "Embo" in its name. The district claims an area of 8.838 km^{2} (3.412 sq mi), which includes disputed areas with barangays Fort Bonifacio, Pinagsama, Ususan, and Western Bicutan.

Official Seal	Barangay	Etymology	District	ZIP code	Population (2024)	Area	Ref.
	Comembo (Note: Also known as Barangay 28)	Combat Enlisted Men's Barrio	1st	1641	16,299	0.27 km^{2} (0.10 sq mi)	
	Pembo (Note: Also known as Barangay 29)	Panthers Enlisted Men's Barrio	1st	1642	47,030	0.64 km^{2} (0.25 sq mi)	
	Rizal (Note: Also known as Barangay 33)	Named after José Rizal	1st	1649	46,061	0.59 km^{2} (0.23 sq mi)	
	Cembo (Note: Also known as Barangay 25)	Central Enlisted Men's Barrio	2nd	1640	25,468	0.22 km^{2} (0.085 sq mi)	
	South Cembo (Note: Also known as Barangay 24)	Central Enlisted Men's Barrio	2nd	1645	15,458	0.20 km^{2} (0.077 sq mi)	
	East Rembo (Note: Also known as Barangay 27)	Riverside Enlisted Men’s Barrio	2nd	1643	26,884	0.44 km^{2} (0.17 sq mi)	
	West Rembo (Note: Also known as Barangay 26)	Riverside Enlisted Men’s Barrio	2nd	1644	30,157	0.55 km^{2} (0.21 sq mi)	
	Pitogo (Note: Also known as Barangay 23)	From pitogo, a local term for a palm plant	2nd	1646	16,244	0.14 km^{2} (0.054 sq mi)	
	Post Proper Northside (Note: Also known as Barangay 30)		2nd	1647	62,227	2.376 km^{2} (0.917 sq mi)	
	Post Proper Southside (Note: Also known as Barangay 31)		2nd	1648	68,388	3.412 km^{2} (1.317 sq mi)	
Total population and area					354,216	8.838 km^{2} (3.412 sq mi)	

Former Makati Barangay Numbering

== Education ==
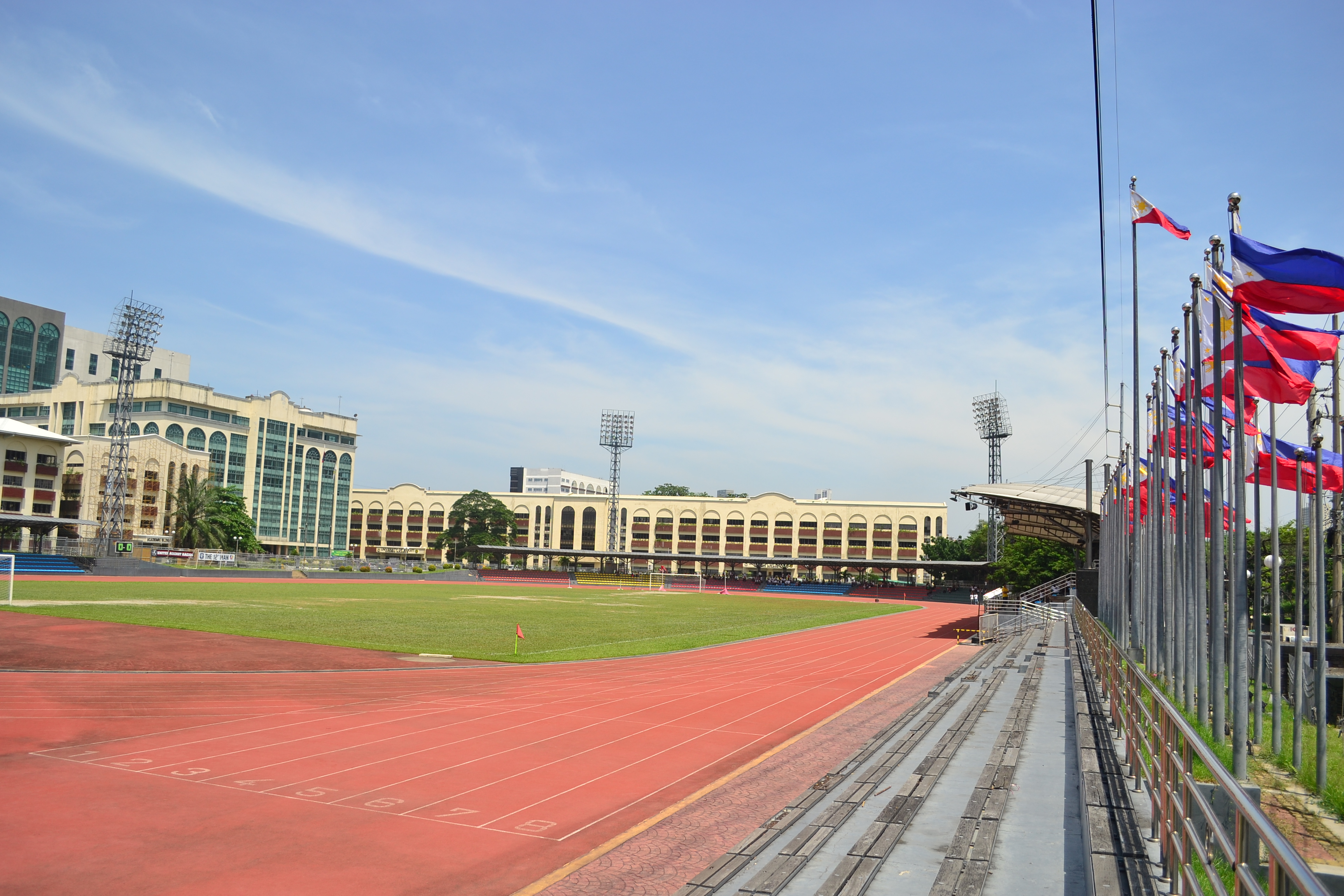
University of Makati is Makati's city-run university. It is now in the territory of Taguig following the Supreme Court ruling which places the Embo barangays under Taguig.

There are 14 public elementary and secondary schools in Embo under the supervision of the Schools Division Office of Taguig City and Pateros (SDO-TAPAT) since January 1, 2024. These schools were formerly under the Schools Division Office of Makati, and were transferred to the jurisdiction of SDO-TAPAT following the resolution of the Makati–Taguig territorial dispute, which was ruled with finality in 2023 that declared that the Fort Bonifacio area, including the Embo barangays, as part of Taguig.

West Rembo was formerly designated by the Makati City Government as the city's Center of Education and Cultural Affairs when the barangay was still under Makati's control. West Rembo contains the University of Makati, while the campus of Makati Science High School is situated in Cembo.

Most of Post Proper Northside and Post Proper Southside overlap territories controlled by barangays Fort Bonifacio and Pinagsama, which are home to educational institutions. Fort Bonifacio is home to private institutions, including international schools and the satellite campuses of De La Salle University and University of the Philippines, in Bonifacio Global City, while Pinagsama is home to Enderun Colleges and MINT College in McKinley Hill and Palar Integrated School, a public school already under the jurisdiction of Taguig.

Public schools in the Enlisted Men's Barrios
School	Image	Address	Type	Ref.
Benigno “Ninoy” S. Aquino High School		Aguho Street, Comembo	High school	
Cembo Elementary School		69 Acacia Street, Cembo	Elementary school	
Comembo Elementary School		Lanzones Street, Comembo	Elementary school	
East Rembo Elementary School		J.P. Rizal Extension, East Rembo	Elementary school	
Fort Bonifacio Elementary School		J.P. Rizal Extension, West Rembo	Elementary school	
Fort Bonifacio High School		J.P. Rizal Extension, West Rembo	High school	
Makati Science High School		09 Kalayaan Avenue, Cembo	Science high school	
Pembo Elementary School		Escuela Street, Pembo	Elementary school	
Pitogo Elementary School		Cebu Street, Pitogo	Elementary school	
Pitogo High School		Negros Street, Pitogo	High school	
Rizal Elementary School		Milkweed Street, Rizal	Elementary school	
South Cembo Elementary School		Gen. A Luna Street, South Cembo	Elementary school	
Tibagan High School		7th Avenue, East Rembo	High school	
West Rembo Elementary School		21st Street, West Rembo	Elementary school	

== Religion ==
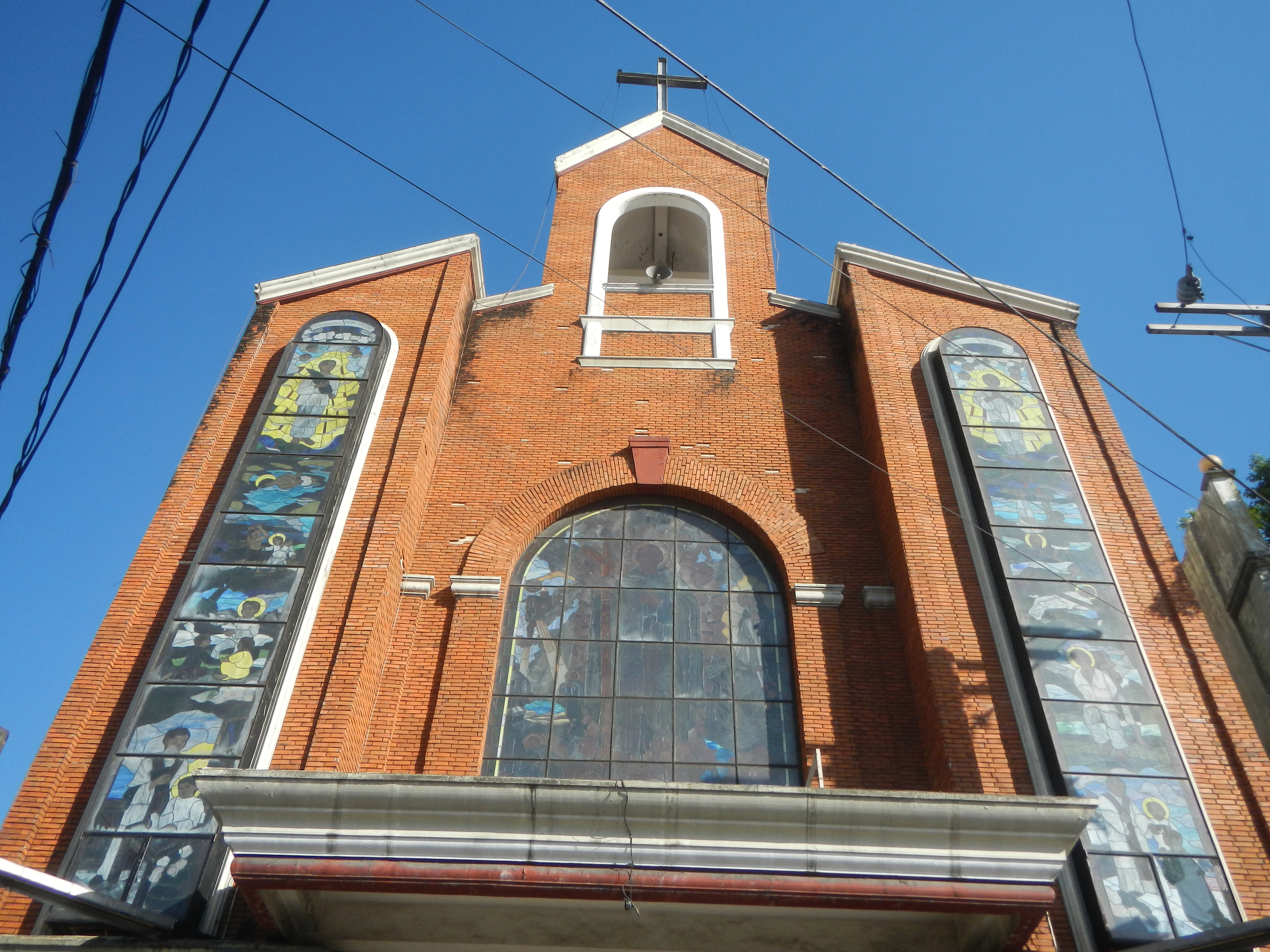
St. John of the Cross Parish Church in Pembo

Mater Dolorosa Parish Church in East Rembo.

The predominantly Roman Catholic population in the Embo barangays, particularly the areas previously controlled by Makati, is served by five parishes under the Archdiocese of Manila. Conversely, the areas already under the control of Taguig, even before the transfer of Post Proper Northside and Post Proper Southside to the city, including the Bonifacio Global City and parts of the Bonifacio Capital District, fall under the Diocese of Pasig.

The Mater Dolorosa Parish under the Amigonian Friars in East Rembo was established on September 8, 1987 through a decree by Manila Archbishop Jaime Cardinal Sin. It originally covered the barangays of Cembo, West Rembo, East Rembo, Comembo, and Pembo. Cembo would later be transferred to the National Shrine of Our Lady of Guadalupe. Saint John of the Cross Parish was established for Pembo on August 9, 1991. On June 18, 1992, Santa Teresita Parish was established in West Rembo. In 1998, a standalone parish for Comembo was proposed and was realized within the span of two years. The Military Ordinariate of the Philippines also has jurisdiction over the Philippine Army headquarters once claimed by Post Proper Southside and formerly Saint Michael the Archangel Parish in Bonifacio Global City, which was previously a military reservation.

The Pembo locale of Iglesia ni Cristo is located at Barangay Rizal. A chapel of The Church of Jesus Christ of Latter-day Saints is located in Comembo. Churches of Baptists and Members Church of God International are also found in the Embo barangays.
