= Inner Fort barangays =

The Inner Fort barangays may refer to one of the two barangays in Taguig, Philippines.

- Post Proper Northside
- Post Proper Southside
