= New Senate Building (Philippines) =

New meeting place of the Senate of the Philippines

- Bagong Senado
- Building under construction in November 2023
- Interactive map of the New Senate Building area

General information
- Status: Under construction
- Location: Philippine Navy Village, Chino Roces Ave. Ext.,Bonifacio Capital District, Fort Bonifacio, Taguig, Philippines
- Coordinates: 14°31′51″N 121°01′35″E
- Groundbreaking: March 18, 2019
- Topped-out: July 20, 2023
- Cost: ₱31.6 billion

Height
- Height: 54 m (177 ft)

Technical details
- Floor count: 11 (+3 basement)
- Floor area: 85,925 m^{2} (924,890 sq ft)
- Grounds: 18,320 m^{2} (197,200 sq ft)

Design and construction
- Architecture firm: AECOM
- Main contractor: Hilmarc's Construction Corp.

Other information
- Parking: 1,200
- Public transit: Future: MMS Senate–DepEd

The New Senate (Filipino: Bagong Senado), also known as the New Senate Building, is a government building under construction in Fort Bonifacio, Taguig, Philippines. It is set to be the new building of the Senate of the Philippines starting in mid-2027.

== History ==
=== Background ===
The Senate of the Philippines has been renting space spanning six floors at the GSIS Building since 1997. It has been proposed for years that the Senate relocate to a new dedicated building. Aquilino Pimentel Jr. in 2000 first proposed the move when he was still Senate president. One rationale for the move was the high rental costs (Note: Historical monthly renting costs: ₱100,000 in 2008; ₱110,000 in 2012; ₱127,000 in 2018) the Senate pays to the Government Service Insurance System (GSIS) for the use of their building.

A Senate building was constructed at the Batasan area with ₱41.163 million spent for the construction. However, the project was discontinued and the building was repurposed for the electoral tribunals of the Senate and the House of Representatives.

=== 2017 initiative ===
It was only in 2017 that plans for a new Senate building had significant progress. Senator Win Gatchalian filed P.S. Resolution No. 293 which created an ad hoc committee to conduct a feasibility study for the construction of a new Senate building.

In November 21, 2017, the Senate selected Fort Bonifacio in Taguig as the site of the new Senate building taking into account various factors such as accessibility, costs, and opinion poll from Senate employees. Antipolo in Rizal was the other option considered. In January 2018, the Senate has pledged to purchase a lot from the Bases Conversion Development Authority.

=== Design selection ===
In February 2018, a design competition for the New Senate Building was open to entrants. 40 firms (16 domestic and 24 foreign) expressed interest to participate. Five were shortlisted to come up and present a design for a new Senate building. These firms are AECOM, Aidea, Henning Larsen Architects, Leeser Architecture, and Pelli Clarke Pelli Architects. AECOM's design was selected as the winning entry.

=== Construction ===
Building under construction as of 2023.

The groundbreaking ceremony for the New Senate Building was held on March 18, 2019, with the structure initially set to be completed by 2022. The Department of Public Works and Highways implemented the construction for the new Senate building project, which in turn awarded the contract to Hilmarc Construction Corporation, which is linked to former Vice President Jejomar Binay (father of then-senator Nancy Binay). A budget of ₱8.9 billion was allocated for the construction project.

Construction would be disrupted by the COVID-19 pandemic in the Philippines. The building was topped-out on July 20, 2023.

The Senate projected to hold its first meeting in the building in July 2024. However, Senate president Francis Escudero said that the move would be postponed until at least 2025, as the building was not yet ready as of May 2024. On June 10, 2024, he ordered the suspension of construction to review concerns over the rising cost of ₱23 billion. Despite this, the construction, whose Phase 1 was 77% complete at that time, would continue unless Senator Alan Peter Cayetano, the chairman of the Senate Committee on Accounts, issues an order to halt the project.

By February 2025, Escudero had assessed that the building will be finished either by late 2026 or early 2027 and that he prefers it to be inaugurated by the then-incoming 21st Congress in 2028, instead of the 20th Congress. In June 2025, Cayetano announced set to target move to Taguig by mid-2027.

In January 2026, Senate president Tito Sotto has stated that the relocation to the new building could be done by the middle or third quarter of 2027. Senator Panfilo Lacson, the current chairperson of the Committee on Accounts, assured Sotto that construction costs will be lower as various budgetary items contributing to the increased expenditures were removed.

== Architecture and design ==
AECOM is the architect responsible for the New Senate Building. It is a complex of four office buildings on a podium structure. The Senate plenary hall is situated in the central part of the podium which is adjacent to the four towers. The sun in the Philippine flag served as inspiration for the structure's form, the Banaue Rice Terraces for its internal greening and facade, and the barong tagalog for its external facade.

== Transportation access ==
The site will be served by the upcoming two rail lines, such as the Metro Manila Subway and the North–South Commuter Railway.
