= Philippine Navy Golf Club =

Public golf course in Taguig, Philippines

- Interactive map of Philippine Navy Golf Club
- 14°31′25″N 121°02′03″E

Club information
- Location: Taguig, Philippines
- Established: 1976
- Type: Public
- Owner: Philippine Navy Golf Club Inc.
- Operator: Philippine Navy Golf Club Inc.

The Philippine Navy Golf Club is a public golf course and club in Fort Bonifacio, Taguig, Metro Manila, Philippines.

== History ==
The Philippine Navy Golf Club was developed at the site of the former Fort Andres Bonifacio Military Reservation which covers lands that were formerly inalienable or could not be sold or disposed of through other means. On September 29, 1965, then President Diosdado Macapagal issued Proclamation No. 461 which separated portions of land from the reservation and declared them as part of the AFP Officers' Village and also made the transferred land alienable and disposable except for areas reserved for public or quasi-judicial purposes.

The Navy Golf Club was developed in 1976, upon the proposal of Philippine Navy Flag Officer-in-Command Admiral Ernesto Ogbinar. The Navy set up the Philippine Navy Golf Club Inc. to manage the golf club.

=== Land ownership dispute ===
The status of the golf course's land was in dispute. It was argued that the Philippine Navy wrongly took over lots owned by Merardo Abaya, Ruben Follosco, Elias Santa Clara and the heirs of Angelito Maglonzo which were part of the AFP Officers' Village to develop a golf course. The Philippine Navy insists that the golf course was built in inalienable land citing Proclamation No. 461 and pointed out the golf course' purpose as a security buffer and training ground for the navy to support its claim that the golf course should be considered as public land. However the legal case culminated in 2020, with the Supreme Court ruling in favor of Abaya, Fullosco, Santa Clara, and Maglonzo. The high court disagreed with the Navy's arguments pointed out that Proclamation No. 461 which was issued in 1965 can't be used to claim land intended as housing for military veterans for other purposes.
