= Ermita de San Nicolas de Tolentino =

Roman Catholic church in Taguig, Philippines

- Saint Nicholas of Tolentino Chapel
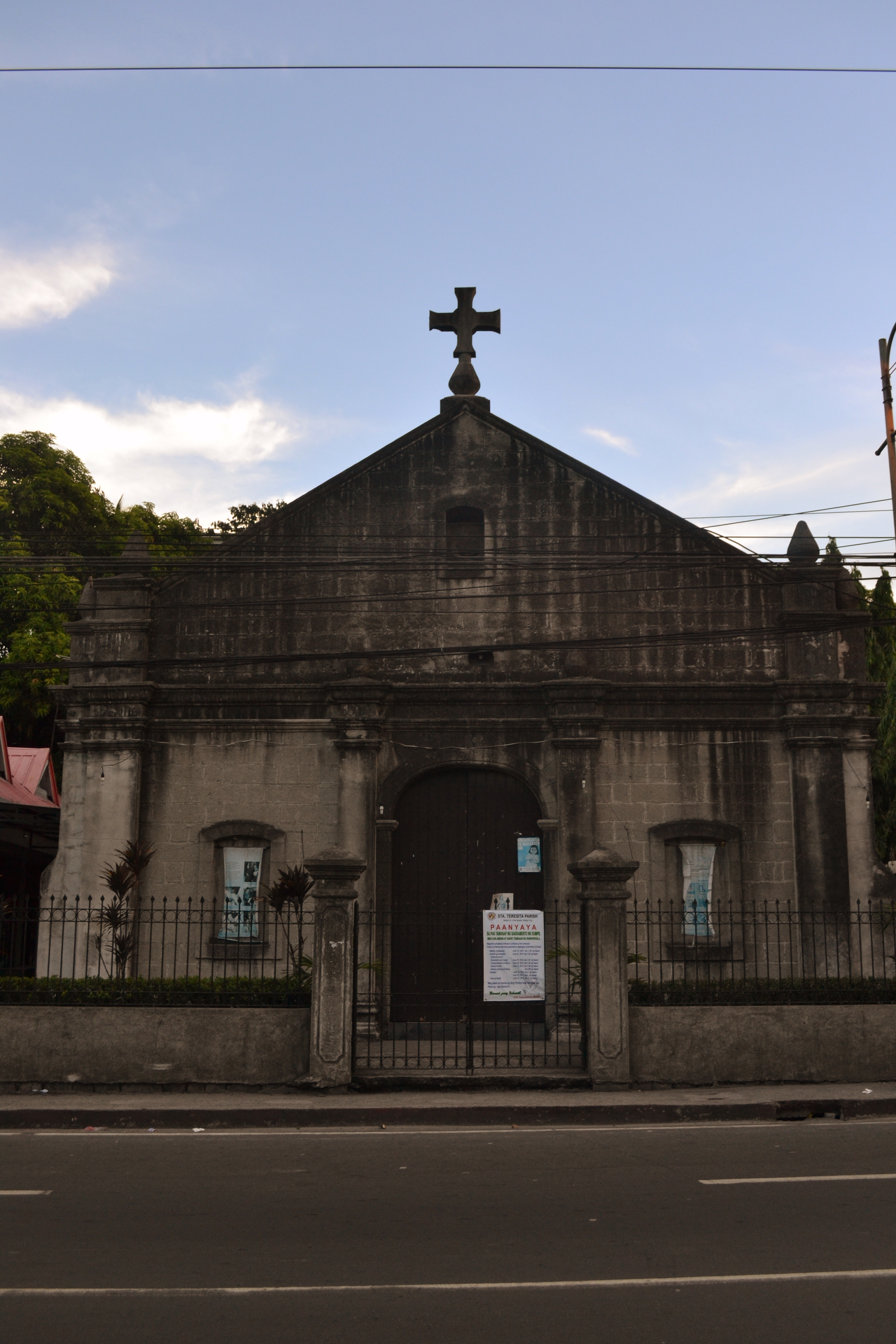
- Chapel facade in 2014
- Ermita de San Nicolas de Tolentino
- 14°33′48″N 121°03′31″E
- Address: J.P. Rizal Avenue Extension, West Rembo, Taguig
- Country: Philippines
- Denomination: Roman Catholic

Architecture
- Architectural type: Church building
- Years built: 1686–1690
- Completed: 1690

Administration
- Archdiocese: Manila

The Ermita de San Nicolas de Tolentino is a Roman Catholic chapel located along J.P. Rizal Avenue Extension in West Rembo, Taguig, Philippines. It is under the jurisdiction of the Archdiocese of Manila.

== History ==
Ermita de San Nicolas de Tolentino was constructed on the expenses of Augustinian Friar Buenaventura de Bejar in 1686 and, four years later, was completed by Friar Diego de Yepes. The building have cogon-covered stone walls.

== The Legend of San Nicolas de Tolentino ==
While the Augustinians actively promoted devotion to Our Lady of Guadalupe in their monastery in Guadalupe, the Chinese faithful were very keen in their own devotion to Nicolas de Tolentino.

According to legend, the Pasig River was inhabited by ferocious caiman, crocodiles which traverse the length of the river to and from Laguna de Bay. A Chinese merchant who refused to be converted to the Christian faith while passing in front of the monastery of Guadalupe was almost caught by the devil disguised as a caiman to devour and bring to hell. Yet despite his being Pagan, he called to the saint venerated in the monastery, calling loudly, "San Nicolasi, San Nicolasi" and in uttering this prayer, the crocodile marvelously turned into stone and left the merchant safely.

Due to this miracle, the Chinese merchant converted to the Christian faith and in thanksgiving erected an ermita near the petrified caiman.

In memory of the miracle, the Chinese held spectacular fluvial procession to the ermita. An Augustinian historian, Fray Joaquin Martinez de Zuñiga, O.S.A. even noted the immensity of the celebrations that "more than a thousand kilos of candles were offered during these devotions."

However, nothing remains of these devotions to San Nicolas de Tolentino with the petrified crocodile, popularly known as the buayang bato cemented over in the 1970s to beautify the Pasig, the old ermita ordered demolished and the image of the saint moved to the monastery in Guadalupe.

The 300-year-old ermita, however, has been restored and is now under the jurisdiction of the Saint Therese of the Child Jesus Parish.
