= Bonifacio Capital District =

Central business district in Taguig, Philippines

- Central Business District
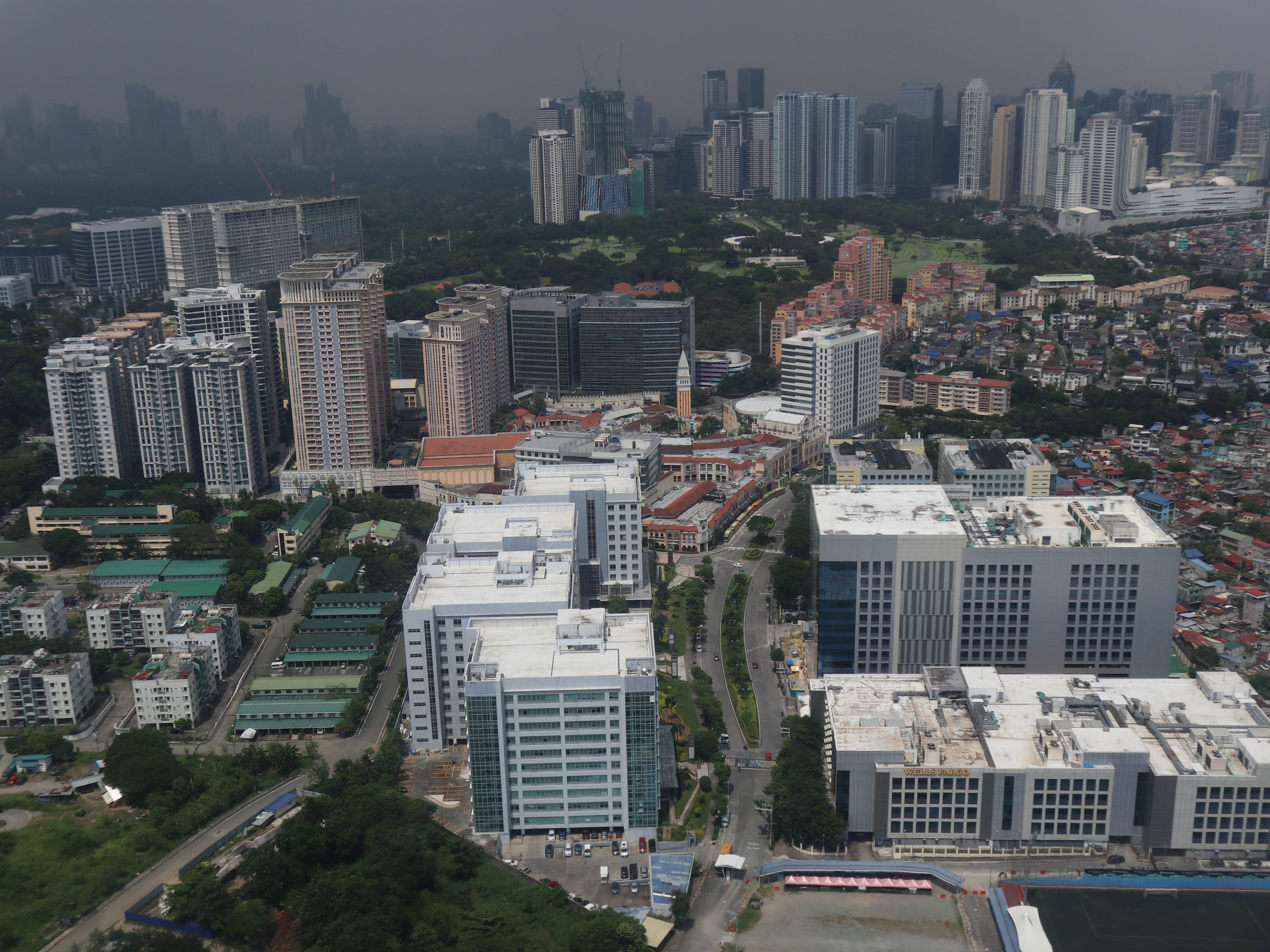
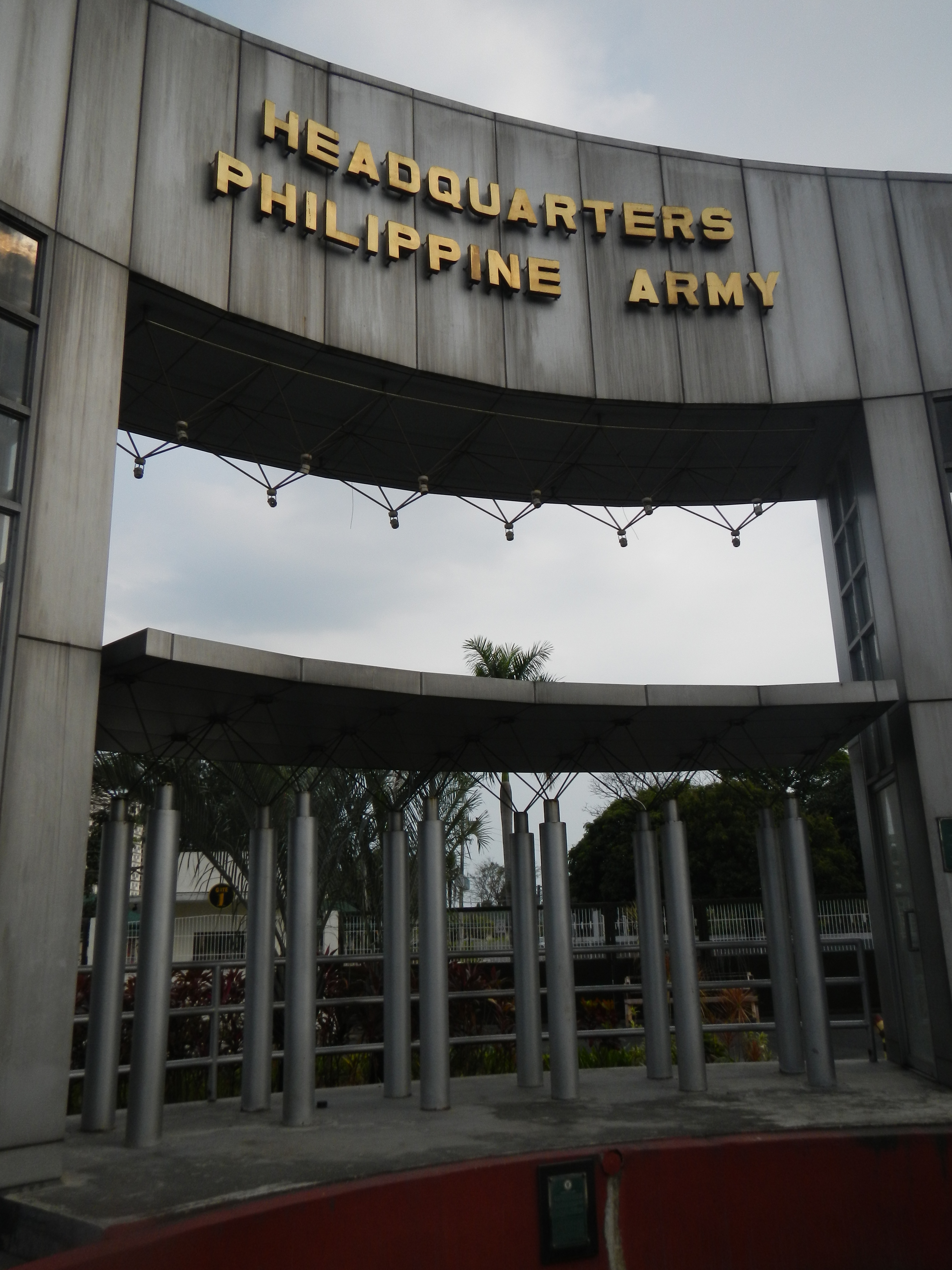
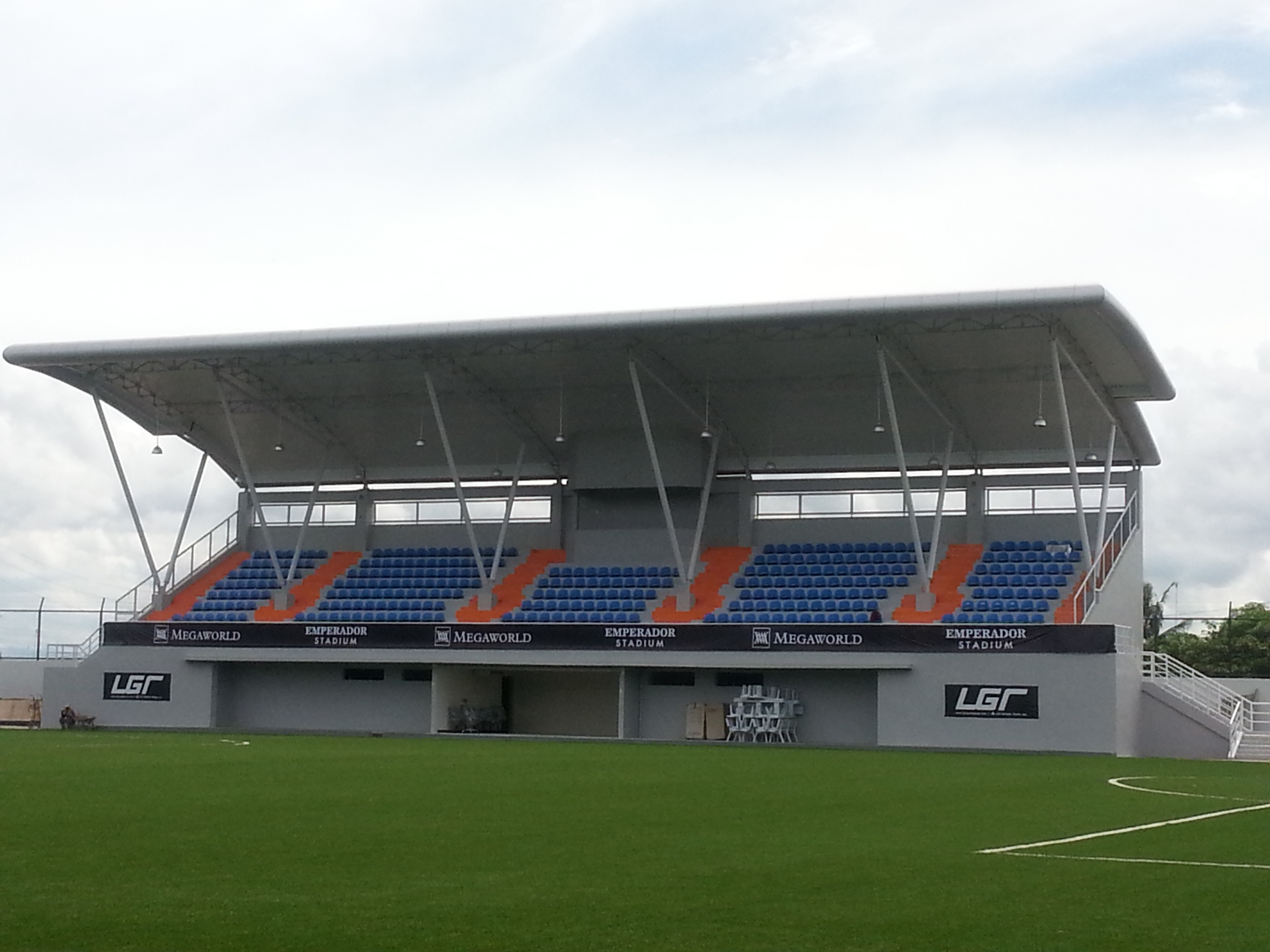
- Clockwise, from top: McKinley Hill, McKinley Hill Stadium, New Senate Building, Fort Bonifacio

- Logo
- Nicknames: BCD
- Location in Metro Manila Location in Luzon Location in the Philippines
- Coordinates: 14°31′55″N 121°02′13″E
- Country: Philippines
- Region: National Capital Region
- City: Taguig
- Barangay: Fort Bonifacio; Pinagsama; Post Proper Southside
- Established: 2019

Area
  - Total: 1.6 km^{2} (0.62 sq mi)
- Time zone: UTC+8 (PST)
- Area code: 2

The Bonifacio Capital District (BCD) is a master-planned estate and financial district in Post Proper Southside, Taguig, Philippines. The estate is under the joint management of Megaworld Corporation and the Bases Conversion and Development Authority (BCDA). The district contains the New Senate Building, the headquarters of the National Mapping and Resource Information Authority (NAMRIA), and the Bonifacio Naval Station. The district is currently being developed under a masterplan that will turn it into a financial center, with McKinley West being the first phase of its multi-year development. Bonifacio Global City (BGC), one of the Philippines' leading financial center, is located just north of the BCD.

Makati claimed the area as part of Barangay Post Proper Southside; the barangay was later reintegrated to the city of Taguig by virtue of the 2021 Supreme Court decision on the border dispute. The barangay hall of Post Proper Southside is located within the Consular Area along Lawton Avenue, Fort Bonifacio.

== History ==
The Bonifacio Capital District (BCD) was created as a joint venture between the private conglomerate Megaworld Corporation with the Bases Conversion and Development Authority (BCDA) of the Philippine national government both of which will manage the area. A memorandum of agreement was signed on March 14, 2019, regarding their plans for the BCD.

The areas placed under the BCD upon its creation were: Megaworld's McKinley Hill and McKinley West developments, BCDA's Philippine Navy Village as well as Bonifacio South Pointe, which is a joint venture with the SM Group and BCDA-owned Consular property beside McKinley West, and a one hectare lot. The BCD is meant to be "country's administrative capital" with the Senate of the Philippines, the Supreme Court, and the Court of Appeals planning to move to the financial district. The development is projected to be completed in 10 years. In 2024, Robinsons Land Corporation purchased 61,761 square meters of land from BCDA for ₱3.5 billion, which was intended to be developed as a mixed-use district with residential, commercial, offices, a hotel and recreational spaces.

In January 2025, a deed of conveyance was signed between BCDA and the Taguig city government for the transfer of 1.7 hectare of land to the city, which the city intends to build community facilities for the benefit of its residents.

== See also ==
- Makati–Taguig boundary dispute
