= Post Proper Southside =

Barangay in Taguig, Philippines

Post Proper Southside Barangay 31
- Barangay
- Post Proper Southside community center in Palar Village

- Seal

- Map of Makati with Post Proper Southside highlighted. Areas in light red indicate overlap with Taguig before the 2023 transfer.

- Location within Metro Manila
- Coordinates: 14°32′30″N 121°02′47″E
- Country: Philippines
- Region: National Capital Region
- City: Taguig
- District: 2nd district of Taguig
- Established: December 31, 1972 (Note: Established as a barangay of Makati, completely ceded to Taguig in October 2023)
- Transfer of control to Taguig: 2023

Government
  - Type: Barangay
  - Barangay Captain: Quirino Sarono
  - SK Chairperson: Francis John San Vicente

Area
  - Total: 3.412 km^{2} (1.317 sq mi)

Population (2024)
  - Total: 68,388
  - Density: 20,040/km^{2} (51,910/sq mi)
- Time zone: UTC+8 (PST)
- Postal Code: 1648
- Area Code: 02

Post Proper Southside, also known as Post Proper South Fort Bonifacio, Barangay 31, or simply Southside, is one of the 38 barangays of Taguig, Philippines. It is one of the ten Embo barangays, and one of the two Inner Fort Bonifacio barangays, the other one being the Post Proper Northside. Previously part of Makati, it was established in 1972 as a settlement inside the Fort Bonifacio Military Reservation, and its territory is disputed with barangays Fort Bonifacio (Bonifacio Capital District, Bonifacio Global City and McKinley Hill), Pinagsama (G2 Village, ISG Village, Palar Village, Panam Village, and Upper West Village), and Ususan (Wildcat Village, Sto.Rosario, Aranai Village). The barangay has multiple exclaves mostly within Palar Village and has settlements in the Consular Area in Lawton Avenue.

According to Makati, its claimed territory consists of the southern tip of Bonifacio Global City and the Manila American Cemetery. Even before its jurisdiction was reintegrated to Taguig, the area is largely under the city's de facto administration instead of Makati.

In April 2023, the disputed barangays outside the BGC were placed under the de jure jurisdiction of Taguig. In October 2023, the Department of the Interior and Local Government issued a memorandum ordering the transfer of the Embo barangays to Taguig.

== Geography ==
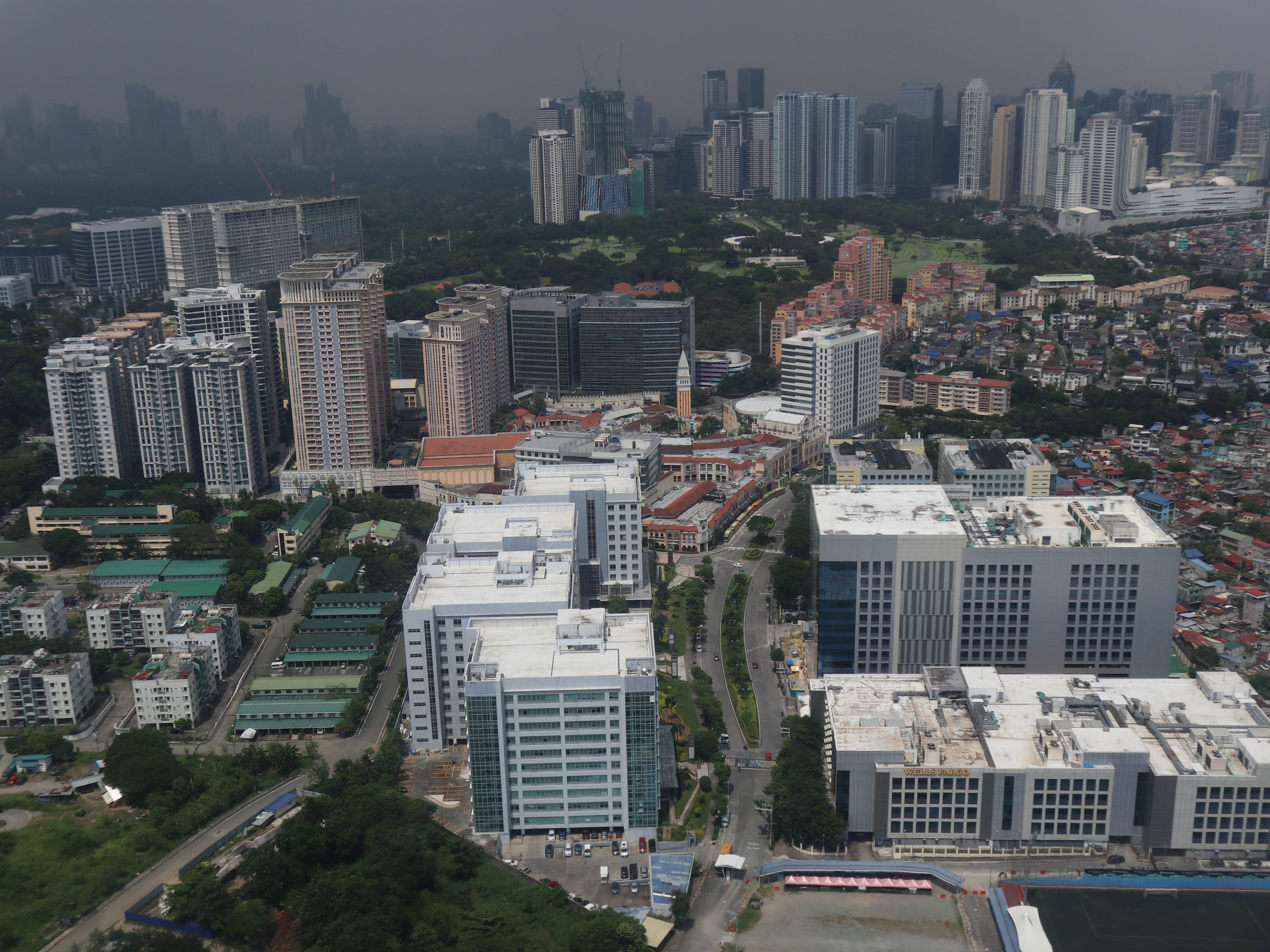
McKinley Hill, Manila American Cemetery, and the Philippine Army headquarters were also considered part of the barangay and is currently under Pinagsama, also in Taguig

The barangay claims an area of 3.412 square kilometers (1.317 sq mi), once the largest barangay of Makati in terms of land area. Now under the jurisdiction of Taguig, it overlaps territories already under the jurisdiction of barangays Fort Bonifacio, Pinagsama, Western Bicutan, and Ususan. Additionally, it shares claims with Pembo, Rizal, and Ususan for the small portions east of Carlos P. Garcia Avenue (C-5 Road) and north of Pedro Cayetano (Levi Mariano) Boulevard. It encompasses the Manila American Cemetery, Bonifacio Capital District, portion of Fort Andres Bonifacio, the southern portion of Bonifacio Global City, Palar Village, Logcom Village, Aranai Village, and Bonifacio Heights. The exact boundary is unclear due to the territorial dispute between Makati and Taguig.

On January 11, 2024, the barangay government announced through its official Facebook page that its barangay captain, Quirino Sarono, had met with his counterparts from Barangays Pinagsama and Ususan, as well as the director of Department of the Interior and Local Government Taguig office, to discuss the solution for the territorial dispute of the three barangays.

== Government ==
Like all other barangays of the Philippines, the barangay government of Post Proper Southside consists of the barangay captain, its chief executive and presiding officer of the seven-member Sangguniang Barangay. It also has a Sangguniang Kabataan (SK) chairman and a seven-member SK council. The aforementioned officials are all elected. Its seat of government, the barangay hall, is located along Lawton Avenue in the area under the jurisdiction of barangay Fort Bonifacio.

Its incumbent barangay captain is Quirino Sarono, while its incumbent SK Chairman is Francis John San Vicente.

== Demographics ==
According to the 2024 Philippine census, Post Proper Southside has a population of 68,388, making it the second most populous barangay in Taguig after Western Bicutan.
