= Pinagsama =

Barangay in Taguig, Metro Manila, Philippines

- Barangay
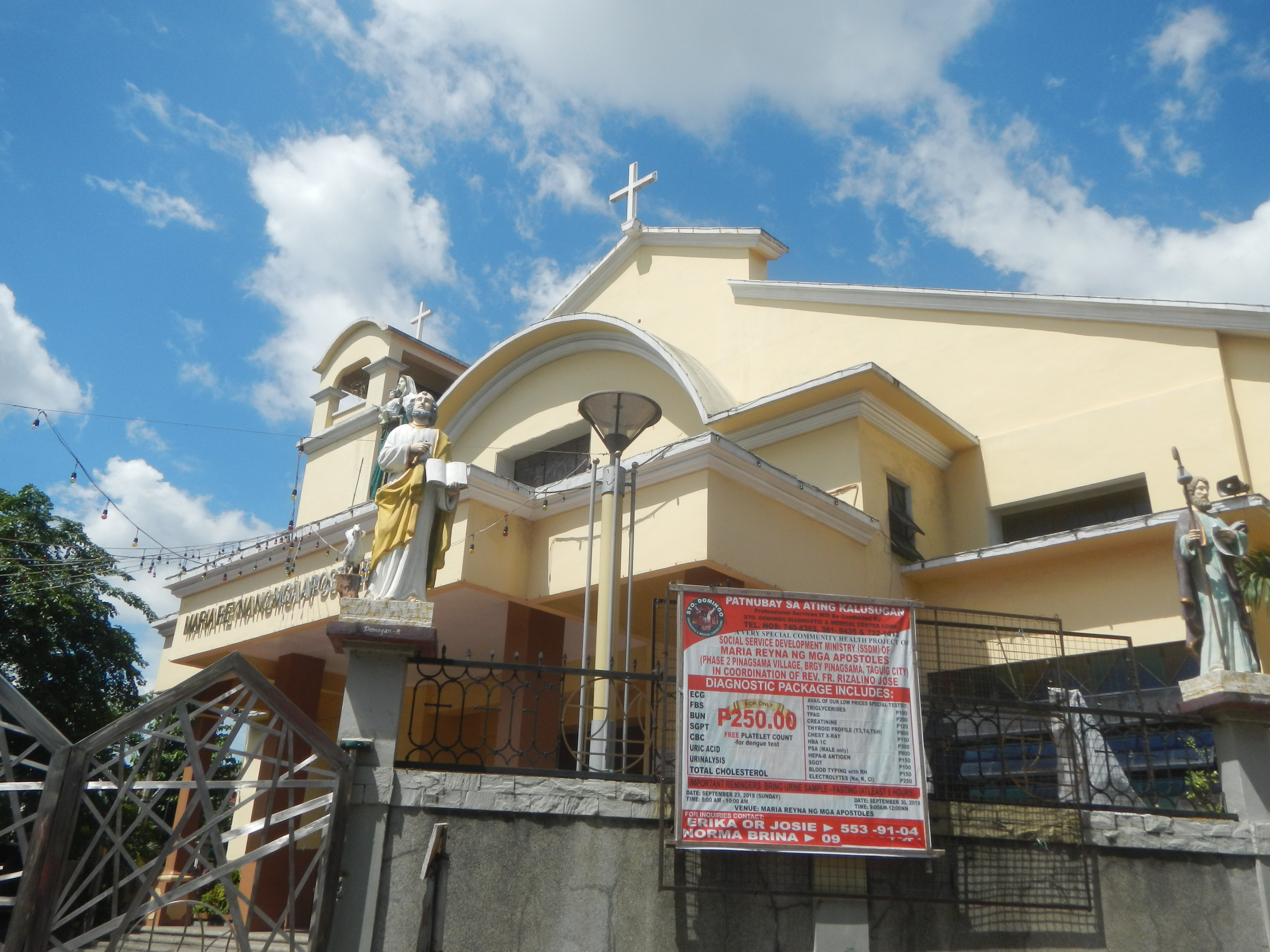
- Maria, Reyna Ng Mga Apostoles Parish Church in Pinagsama Village Phase 2

- Seal
- Motto: "Malinis, Makatao, Hindi Mapang-abuso." ("Clean, Humane, Non-abusive.")
- Location within Metro Manila
- Coordinates: 14°31′22.28″N 121°3′19.95″E
- Country: Philippines
- Region: National Capital Region
- City: Taguig
- District: 2nd Congressional District
- Established: December 12, 2008

Government
  - Type: Barangay
  - Barangay Captain: Ma. Victoria Mortel
  - Barangay Councilor: Gemma Gonzales; Nestor Alvior; Apolonio Fulo Jr.; Prudencio Cuaresma; Jomarie Laggui; Romeo Ruado; Reagan Ricafort
  - Sangguniang Kabataan Chairperson: Daniela Micah Cruz

Area
  - Total: 1.913 km^{2} (0.739 sq mi)

Population (2024)
  - Total: 59,759
  - Density: 31,240/km^{2} (80,910/sq mi)
- Time zone: UTC+8 (PST)
- Postal Code: 1630
- Area Code: 02

Pinagsama (Tagalog: [pinag'sama] lit. 'Combined') is an urban barangay in Taguig, Metro Manila, Philippines.

Located in the western part of Taguig, the barangay was originally a thriving community of mixed residential and commercial developments along Circumferential Road 5 (C-5) and has become an important residential, commercial and industrial center of Taguig. It is also the fifth most populated barangay in Taguig.

The McKinley Hill development adjacent to Bonifacio Global City can be found in the barangay.

== Etymology ==
The barangay's name is taken from the Tagalog past-tense word pinagsama meaning "combined" or "united." This name was conceived due to the adjoining existence of various territorial villages such as Wildcat Village, 16th ISU Village, ISG Central Village, G2 Village, Upper West Village, Panam Village, Palar Village, Pinagsama Village Phases 1 and 2, AFP EP Village Phases 1 and 2, Heritage Park, parcel of the Inner-Fort Bonifacio, and McKinley Hill to form this barangay.

== History ==
Barangay Pinagsama was split from Barangay Western Bicutan by virtue of Taguig City Ordinance No. 67 Series of 2008 dated September 15, 2008. An official plebiscite was held in Western Bicutan on December 12, 2008, with an overwhelming majority in favor for the creation of the new barangay. The first set of barangay officials were appointed by Mayor Sigfrido Tiñga on April 4, 2009.

Despite being recognized as a barangay of Taguig, it was among the excluded barangays from the Internal Revenue Allotment. To address this, House Bills were filed since the 16th Congress to officially establish Pinagsama as a barangay of Taguig. As of 2025, a law has not been enacted to grant it a legislative charter.

== Landmarks ==
Barangay Pinagsama is home to the McKinley Hill development, as well as foreign embassies and educational institutions.

=== Educational institutions ===
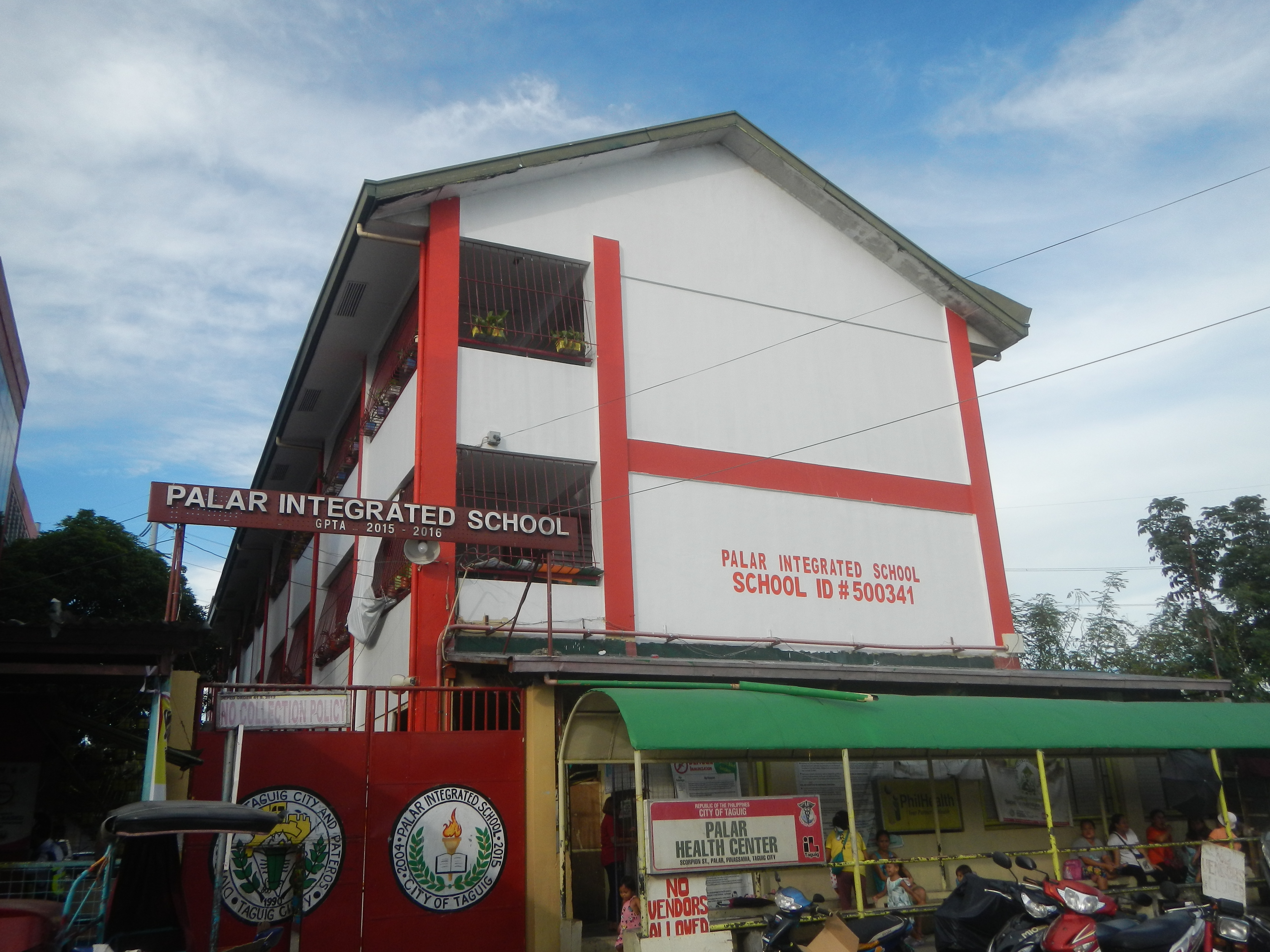
Palar Integrated School

Pinagsama is home to three public schools of Taguig and 23 private basic education schools. Enderun Colleges, MINT College, and two international schools are also located in McKinley Hill. The Fisher Valley College is another tertiary educational institution in the barangay.

=== Foreign embassies ===
There are four (4) foreign embassies located in Barangay Pinagsama:

- Qatar
- South Korea
- United Arab Emirates
- United Kingdom

== Geography ==
Pinagsama is bounded by barangays Fort Bonifacio and Rizal and the Manila American Cemetery to the north; barangays Pembo, Rizal, Ususan, and North Signal Village to the east; barangay Central Signal Village to the south; and barangay Western Bicutan to the west. The northern portion of the barangay, including Palar Village and McKinley Hill, overlaps with barangay Post Proper Southside, which was claimed by Makati until its transfer to Taguig in 2023, but its unclear boundary persists due to the Makati–Taguig boundary dispute. Pinagsama Creek, a tributary of the Taguig River, cuts through the northern half of Pinagsama and Ususan.

== Official seal ==
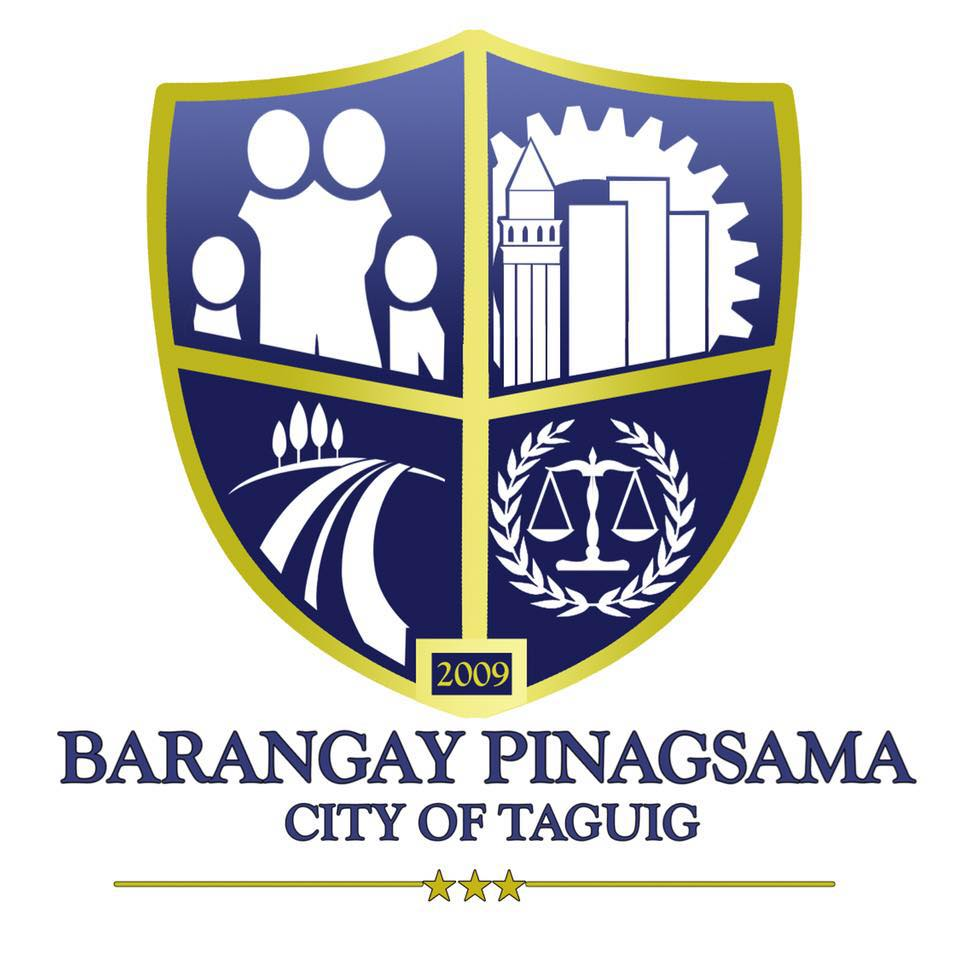

The current seal, adopted in 2017, encapsulates key elements symbolizing the protection provided by the barangay government, depicted through a gold shield against a blue backdrop representing leadership and peace. The quadrant features representations of a united family on the upper left and businesses in the eleven zones, with the replica of the St Mark's Campanile at Venice Grand Canal Mall as a prominent landmark, on the upper right. On the lower left, the highway icon recognizes the significance of Carlos P. Garcia Avenue in the barangay's progress, while trees on the background represent the environment's importance. On the lower right, a weighing scale on the lower right embodies justice and a laurel wreath signifies victory in governance. The seal also notes the establishment year, 2009, and the "Barangay Pinagsama City of Taguig" in royal blue font color signifies peace and power. The white icons represent purity and success, and the three golden stars symbolize Discipline, Public Service, and Excellence, with a golden line representing stability in governance.

Former seals

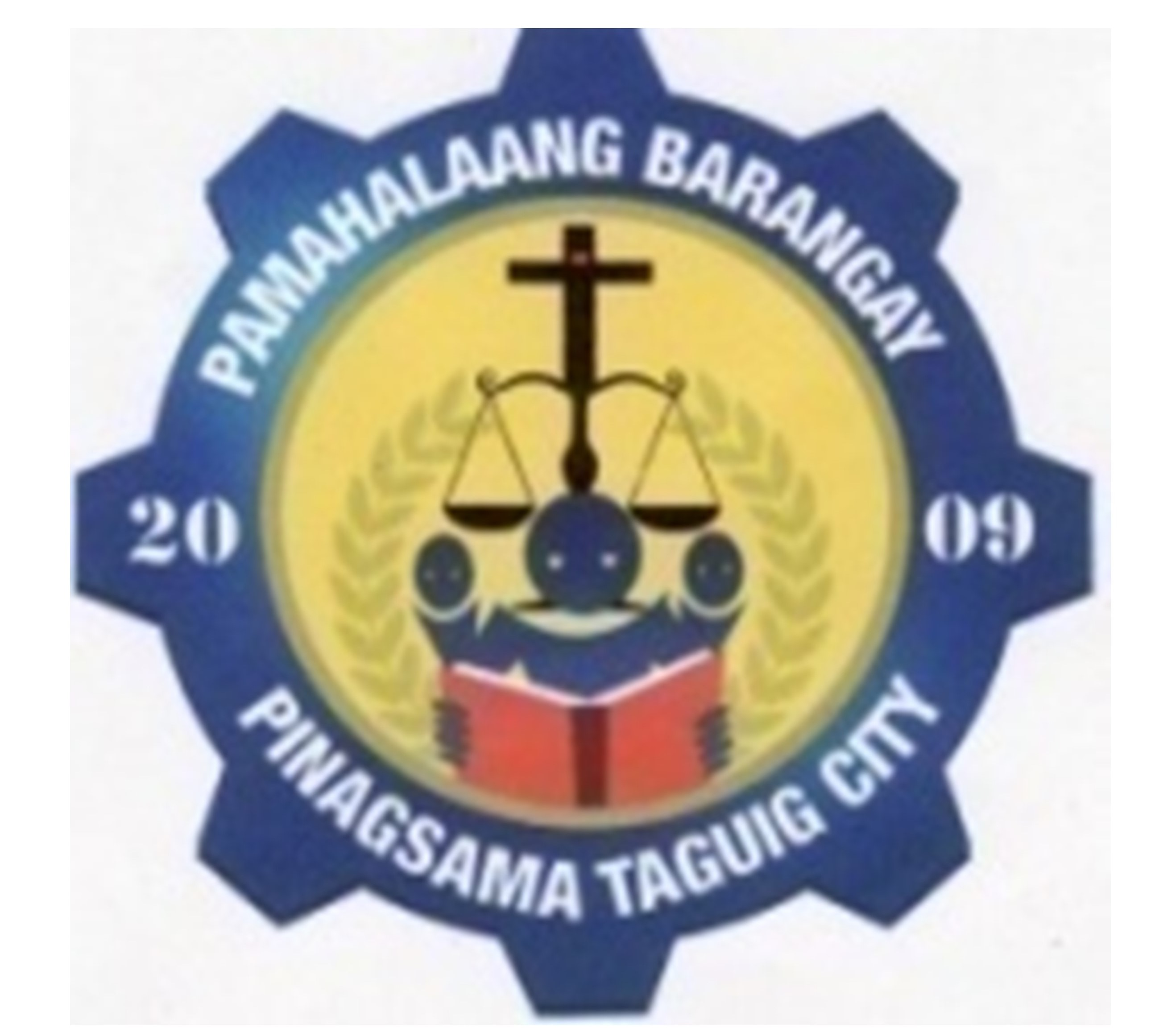
2009–2012

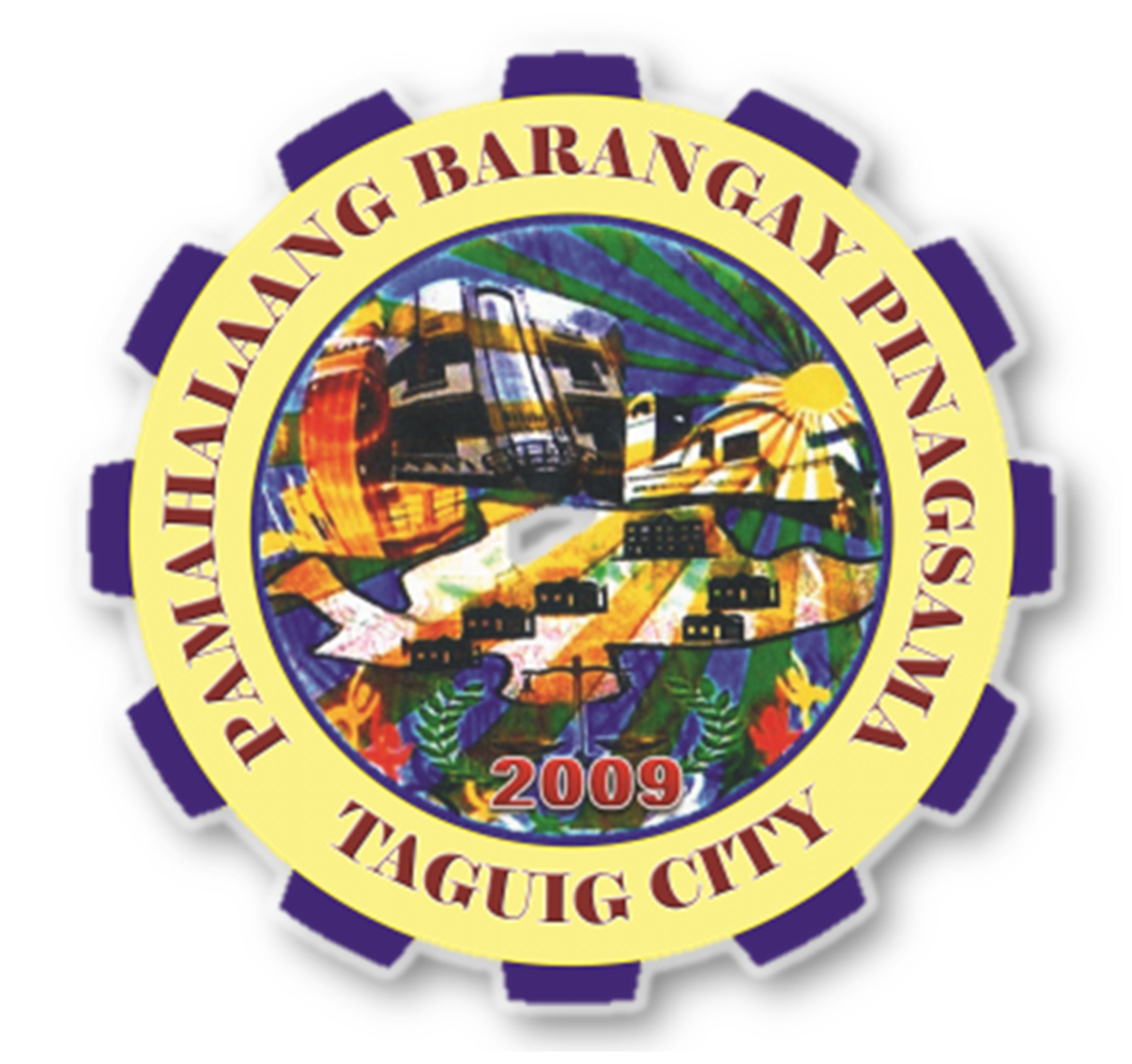
2012–2017
