= Post Proper Northside =

Barangay in Taguig, Philippines

Post Proper Northside Barangay 30
- Barangay
- Post Proper Northside Signage at the entrance of Teachers' Compound along Kalayaan Avenue

- Seal

- Map of Makati with Post Proper Northside highlighted. Areas in light red indicate claimed territory within Fort Bonifacio, Taguig.

- Location within Metro Manila
- Coordinates: 14°33′46″N 121°03′16″E
- Country: Philippines
- Region: National Capital Region
- City: Taguig
- District: 2nd District
- Established: December 11, 1972
- Transfer of control to Makati (de facto): January 7, 1986
- Transfer of control to Taguig (de jure): October 26, 2023

Government
  - Type: Barangay
  - Barangay Captain: Richard Pasadilla
  - SK Chairperson: Joshua Daniel Espejo

Area
  - Total: 2.376 km^{2} (0.917 sq mi)

Population (2024)
  - Total: 62,277
  - Density: 26,210/km^{2} (67,890/sq mi)
- Time zone: UTC+8 (PST)
- Postal Code: 1647
- Area Code: 02

Post Proper Northside, also known as Post Proper North, or simply Northside, is one of the 38 barangays of Taguig, Philippines. It is the fourth most populous barangay in the city, with a population of 62,277 according to the 2024 census. It is one of the ten Embo barangays, and one of the two Inner Fort barangays, the other being the Post Proper Southside.

== Geography ==
The administrative division claims an area of 2.376 square kilometers (0.917 sq mi), mostly overlapping with barangay Fort Bonifacio. It claims most of Bonifacio Global City (BGC). The non-overlapping portion, meanwhile, is a small area located between barangays Cembo and West Rembo which consists of Makati City Jail, Teachers' Compound, and Villa Kalayaan, all situated to the north of Kalayaan Avenue.

=== Divisions ===
- Makati City Jail
- Teachers' Compound
- Villa Kalayaan

== Demographics ==
According to the 2024 Philippine census, Post Proper Northside has a population of 62,277, making it the fourth most populous barangay of Taguig.

== Government ==
Like all other barangays of the Philippines, the barangay government of Post Proper Northside consists of the barangay captain, its chief executive and presiding officer of the seven-member Sangguniang Barangay. It also has a Sangguniang Kabataan (SK) chairman and a seven-member SK council. The aforementioned officials are all elected. Its seat of government, the barangay hall, is located at the Macda Compound along J. P. Rizal Avenue in Cembo. The previous location was along Lawton Avenue, prior to the construction of the Santa Monica–Lawton Bridge.

Its incumbent barangay captain is Richard Pasadilla, while its incumbent SK Chairman is Joshua Daniel Espejo.
