= Western Bicutan =

Barangay in Taguig, Metro Manila, Philippines

- Barangay
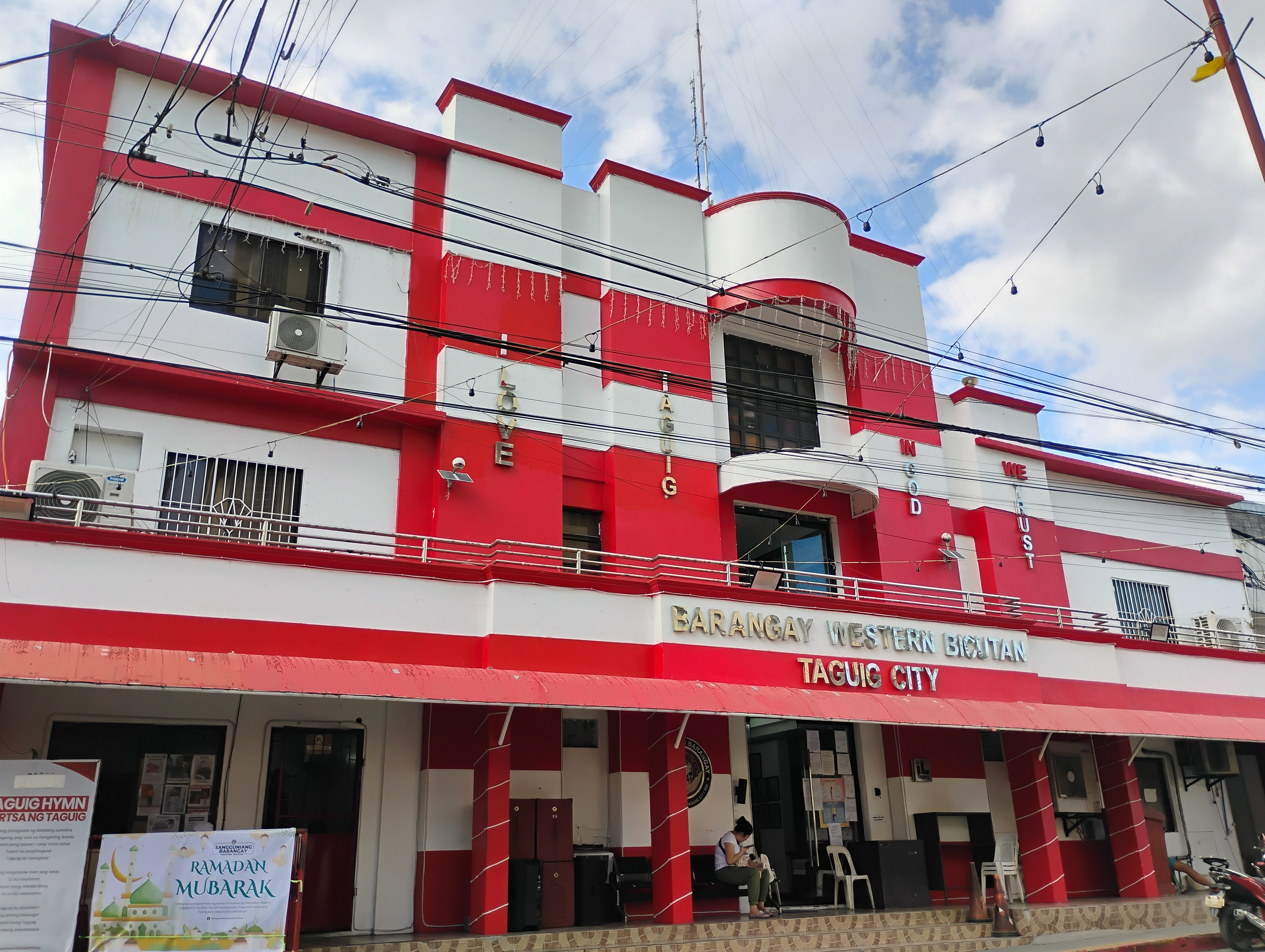
- Barangay Hall

- Seal

- Location within Metro Manila
- Coordinates: 14°30′33.69″N 121°2′17.28″E
- Country: Philippines
- Region: National Capital Region
- City: Taguig
- District: 2nd District
- Created: 1964

Government
  - Type: Barangay
  - Barangay Captain: Pedrito Bermas
  - Barangay Councilor: Hon. Oscar Dio; Hon. Leonora Peru; Hon. Noel Cadiz; Hon. Ernesto Occiano; Hon. John Rolan Fuentes; Hon. Jose Giron Jr.; Hon. Raymundo Poblacion
  - SK Chairperson: Kim Malubay
  - SK Councilors: Hon. Rovic S. Cambe; Hon. Ian Dominic S. Abat; Hon. Mark Nino D. Garay; Hon. David Hans S. Martinez

Population (2024)
  - Total: 89,897
- Time zone: UTC+8 (PST)
- Postal Code: 1630
- Area code: 02

Western Bicutan is one of the 38 barangays of Taguig, Philippines. It is the city's largest barangay in terms of population and land area.

It contains the Arca South, a mixed-use township development, and the Food Terminal Inc., a government food hub and industrial zone. Prominent landmarks within the barangay are the Technological University of the Philippines – Taguig, the southern portion of Naval Station Jose Francisco, Philippine Navy Golf Club, AFPOVAI, Libingan ng mga Bayani, Taguig–Pateros District Hospital, Veterans Museum, and the TESDA headquarters.

== History ==
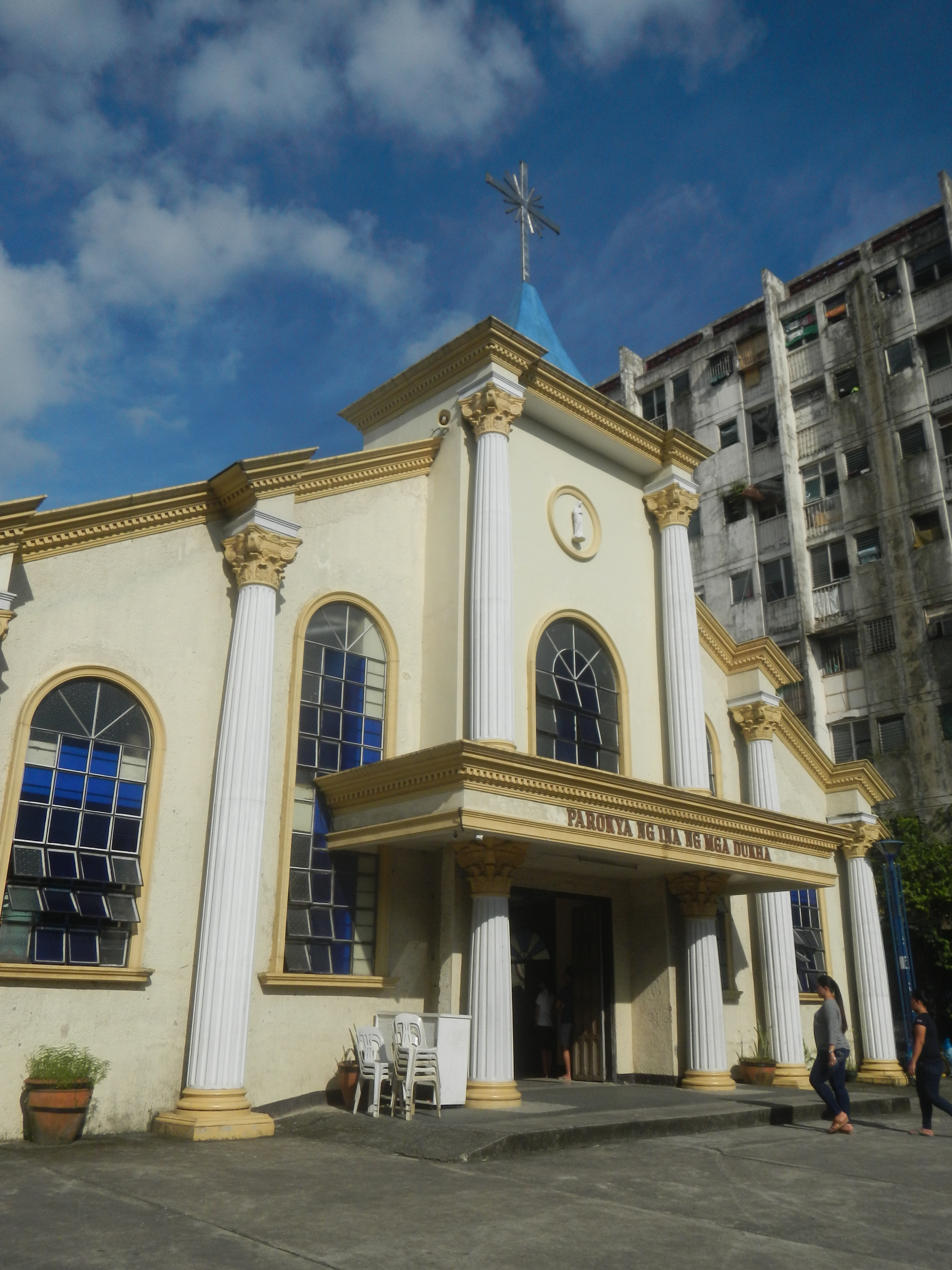
Our Lady of the Poor Parish Churc

The barangay was historically part of the historical barangay Bicutan, which would be split into barangays Central Bicutan, Lower Bicutan, New Lower Bicutan, Upper Bicutan, and Western Bicutan.

In 2008, two barangays were created out of Western Bicutan, namely: Fort Bonifacio and Pinagsama.
