= Fort Bonifacio (barangay) =

- Barangay
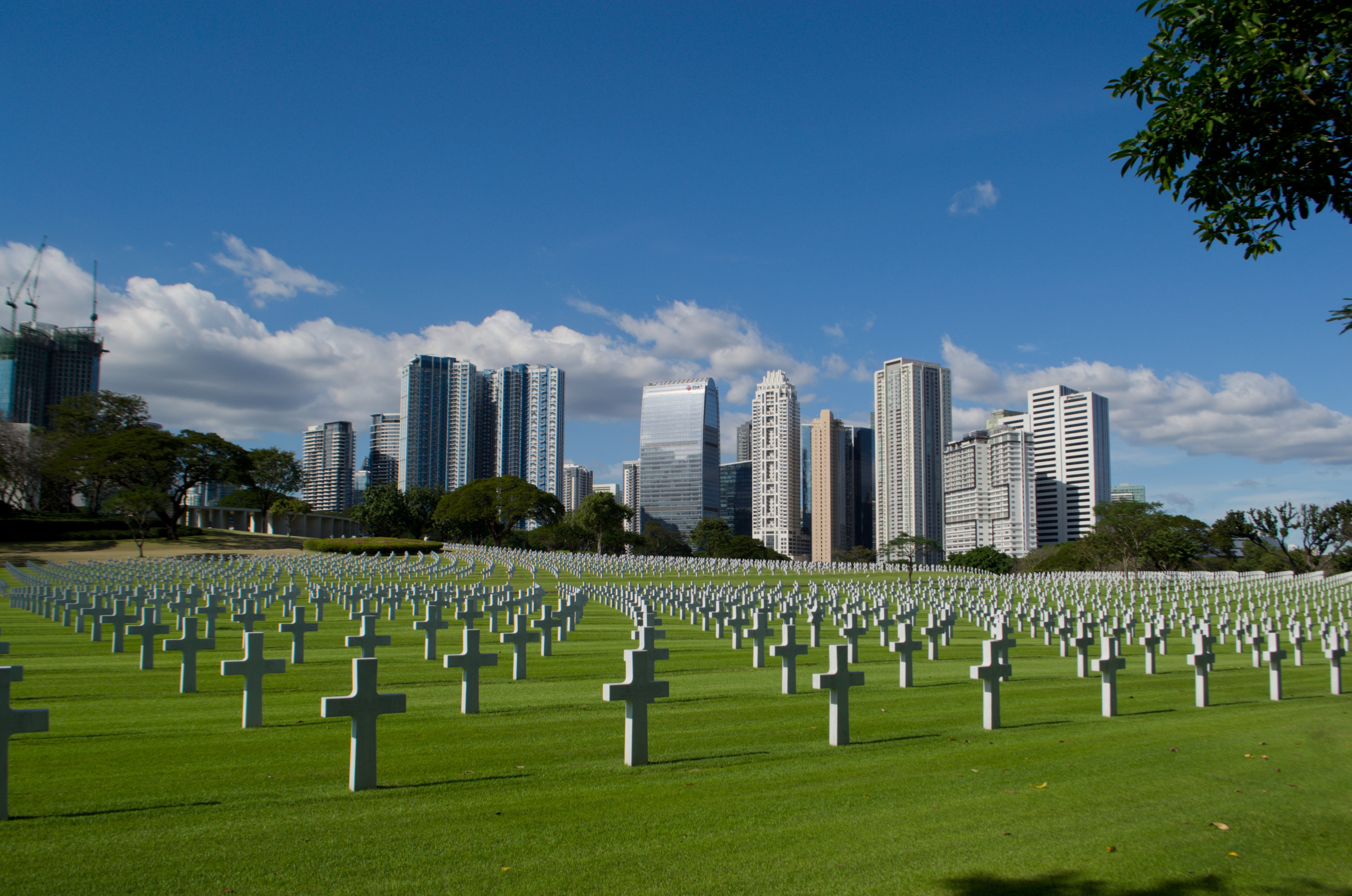
- From top: Bonifacio Global City skyline from the Manila American Cemetery, McKinley West

- Seal
- Interactive map of Fort Bonifacio
- Location within Metro Manila
- Coordinates: 14°31′51.94″N 121°2′52.25″E
- Country: Philippines
- Region: National Capital Region
- City: Taguig
- Established (as Taguig barangay): December 12, 2008

Government
  - Type: Barangay
  - Barangay Captain: Sonny Vertulfo
  - Barangay Councilor: Helen Lara; Vilma Padua; Joseph Parras; Amante Dela Cruz Jr.; Maricris Palma; Sarah Grace Asyao
  - Sangguniang Kabataan Chairperson: Yancy Mae Sapinoso

Area
  - Total: 2.4 km^{2} (0.93 sq mi)

Population (2024)
  - Total: 12,140
  - Density: 5,100/km^{2} (13,000/sq mi)
- Time zone: UTC+8 (PST)
- Postal Code: 1630; 1635 (Bonifacio Global City)
- Area code: 02
- Website: www.barangayfortbonifacio.com

Fort Bonifacio is one of the 38 barangays of Taguig, Philippines. The financial district of Bonifacio Global City, the Fort Bonifacio military camp, the Manila American Cemetery, and McKinley West of the Bonifacio Capital District are under the jurisdiction of the barangay.

== History ==
=== Fort McKinley and Fort Bonifacio ===
During the American colonial period, the US government acquired a 25.78 km^{2} (9.95 sq mi) property within what was then disputed area between Makati, Taguig for military purposes. This area (Transfer Certificate of Title (TCT) dated 1902) was turned into a camp then known as Fort William McKinley after the 25th US president, William McKinley. After the Philippines gained its political independence from the United States on July 4, 1946, the US bestowed to the Republic of the Philippines all rights of possession, jurisdiction, supervision and control over the Philippine territory except the use of their military bases. On May 14, 1949, Fort McKinley was turned over to the Philippine government by virtue of US Embassy Note No. 0570.

Under the AFP leadership of Gen. Alfonso Arellano, Fort McKinley was made the permanent headquarters of the Philippine Army in 1957 and was subsequently renamed Fort Bonifacio, after the Father of the Philippine Revolution against Spain, Andres Bonifacio, whose father, Santiago Bonifacio, was a native of Taguig, which was then a town part of the Province of Tondo (later Manila).

=== During the Marcos rule ===
When Ferdinand Marcos placed the Philippines under martial law in 1972, Fort Bonifacio became the host of three detention centers full of political prisoners - the Ipil Reception Center (sometimes called the Ipil Detention Center), a higher security facility called the Youth Rehabilitation Center (YRC), and the Maximum Security Unit where Senators Jose W. Diokno and Benigno Aquino Jr. were detained. Ipil was the largest prison facility for political prisoners during martial law. Among the prisoners held there were some of the country's leading academics, creative writers, journalists, and historians including Butch Dalisay, Ricky Lee, Bienvenido Lumbera, Jo Ann Maglipon, Ninotchka Rosca, Zeus Salazar, and William Henry Scott. After certain portions of Fort Bonifacio were privatized, the area in which Ipil was located became the area near the present-day sites of S&R Membership Shopping BGC and MC Home Depot, near 32nd Street and 8th Avenue in Bonifacio Global City, while the YRC became a government facility just outside of Barangay Fort Bonifacio.

=== Creation of Bonifacio Global City ===
On March 19, 1992, President Corazon C. Aquino signed the Bases Conversion and Development Act of 1992 (Republic Act No. 7227) into law, creating the Bases Conversion and Development Authority (BCDA), tasked with converting Military Bases into "integrated developments, dynamic business centers and vibrant communities."

On February 7, 1995, the BCDA and a consortium led by Metro Pacific Investments Corporation formed a joint venture called the Fort Bonifacio Development Corporation (FBDC) for the purpose of developing 150 hectares (370 acres) of former Fort Bonifacio land. The private group bought a 55% stake in the FBDC for ₱30.4 billion, while BCDA held on to the remaining 45% stake. The FBDC's landmark project was conceived as Bonifacio Global City, a real estate development area meant to accommodate 250,000 residents and 500,000 daytime workers and visitors. The project was hampered by the 1997 Asian financial crisis, but moved forward when Ayala Land, Inc. and Evergreen Holdings, Inc. of the Campos Group purchased Metro Pacific's controlling stake in FBDC in 2003.

=== Land dispute ===
On December 9, 1937, the Deed of Absolute sale executed by the owner, Don Anacleto Madrigal Acopiado in favor of the American Government covering the area of 100 hectares (250 acres), portion of Bicutan, Taguig, annotated at the back of TCT No. 408. During the American Commonwealth, it was converted to a Military base, named Fort McKinley. It was during the presidency of the late President Ferdinand E. Marcos' administration when Fort McKinley was renamed Fort Bonifacio and transferred to Makati. Taguig got the jurisdiction over Fort Bonifacio after winning the case against Makati in filed in the Pasig Regional Trial Court in 1993. Makati appealed the ruling, but the Pasig RTC in 2011 still sided with Taguig, saying that Fort Bonifacio including the EMBO Barangays are all part of Taguig. Makati then asked the Court of Appeals to review the case. The Court of Appeals overturned the Pasig Regional Trial Court's decision and reverted jurisdiction of the BGC in favor of Makati. Taguig has filed a Motion of Reconsideration at the Court of Appeals seeking to revert the decision which the Court did. The Supreme Court then finally agreed with the Pasig RTC ruling in April 2022 and junked the motion for reconsideration that was filed by the Makati city government to override the court's earlier decision, siding with Taguig.

The newest Court of Appeals Resolution promulgated on October 3, 2017. In a 18-page resolution promulgated on March 8 penned by Associate Justice Edwin Sorongon and was concurred by Justices Ramon Cruz and Renato Francisco, the CA's Special Former Sixth Division granted Taguig's motion to dismiss citing Makati's violation of the forum shopping rule (or pursuing simultaneous remedies in two different courts) and accordingly dismissed the latter's appeal of the earlier decision of the Pasig Regional Trial Court (RTC) which originally ruled in favor of Taguig.

The CA took notice of the Supreme Court's decision on June 15, 2016, which found Makati guilty of “willful and deliberate forum shopping.”

“However, the Supreme Court has not spoken. Ineluctably, we must adhere. The issue of whether Makati committed willful and deliberate forum shopping in these cases has been finally laid to rest no less than by the Supreme Court,” the CA said in a ruling. With this development, the rightful owner of the former military reservation is Taguig.

=== Establishment as Taguig barangay ===
Barangay Fort Bonifacio was created as a barangay of Taguig by virtue of the Sangguniang Panlungsod Ordinance No. 68 Series of 2008 out of Barangay Western Bicutan. The western part of Barangay Ususan, which consists of the Bonifacio Global City and Manila American Cemetery, became part of the new barangay as well. It started to function on April 4, 2009, under the first appointed barangay officials with Armando Lopez as its first barangay captain and six barangay kagawads.

Despite being recognized as a barangay of Taguig, it was among the excluded barangays from the Internal Revenue Allotment. To address this, House Bills were filed in each legislature since the 16th Congress to officially establish Fort Bonifacio as a barangay of Taguig. As of 2025, a law has not been enacted to grant it a legislative charter.

== Geography ==
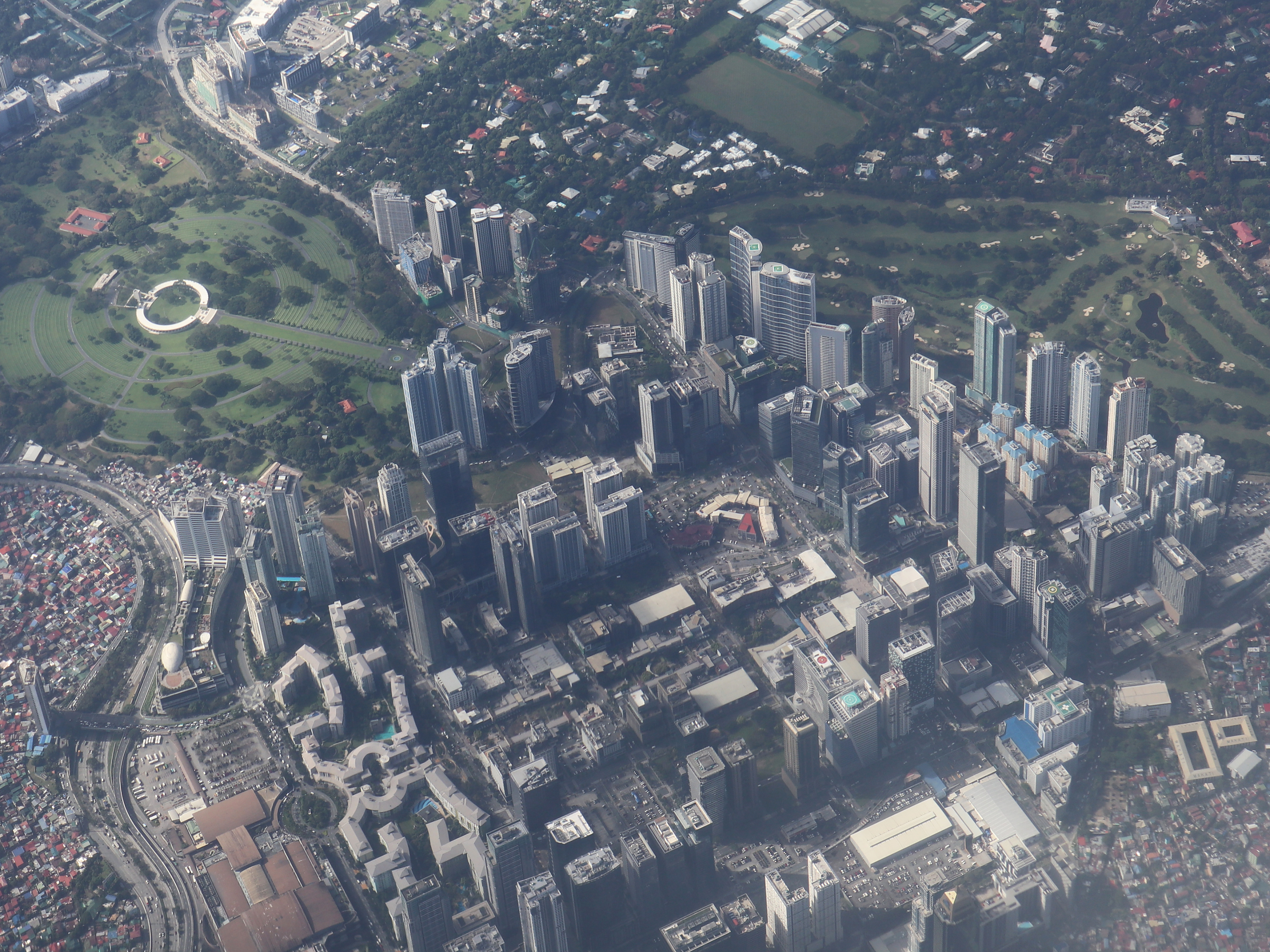
Bird's eye view of Fort Bonifacio, featuring Bonifacio Global City and the Manila American Cemetery

Barangay Fort Bonifacio is bounded by barangays of Magallanes, Dasmariñas, Forbes Park in Makati and the Embo barangays of Pitogo, South Cembo, and West Rembo in Taguig on the north; the barangays East Rembo and Pembo and a portion of the land claimed by barangay Ususan on the east; barangays Pinagsama and Western Bicutan on the south; and Barangay 183 in Pasay on the southwest.

The barangay overlaps two Inner Fort barangays previously claimed by Makati, namely: Post Proper Northside, which has been occupied by Bonifacio Global City, and Post Proper Southside, which is mainly occupied by the Fort Andres Bonifacio and McKinley West. Since 2023, both barangays are part of Taguig as well. Although the geographical expanse of Fort Bonifacio spans from Maricaban Creek in the north to Lawton Avenue in the south, the Consular Area along Lawton Avenue remains under the jurisdiction of Post Proper Southside, which also houses its barangay hall in that area.

The Bonifacio High Street forms the physical core of Bonifacio Global City and is essentially designed as a three-by-three matrix of high-tech offices and residential buildings, retail outlets and pedestrian-friendly roads and walkways. The grid approach ensures a city center that is easy to navigate. The 5th and 11th Avenues and 32nd and 26th Streets serve as the boundaries of the city center. The One Bonifacio High Street, where the PSE Tower, which houses the unified trading floor of the Philippine Stock Exchange, along with the Shangri-La at the Fort, Manila is also located.

== See also ==
- Post Proper Northside
- Post Proper Southside
