= 2013 Philippine House of Representatives elections in Metro Manila =

Elections were held in Metro Manila (the National Capital Region) for seats in the House of Representatives of the Philippines on May 13, 2013.

In any given district, the candidate who receives a plurality of votes will receive that district's seat for the 16th Congress of the Philippines.

== Summary ==
Party	Popular vote	%	Swing	Seats won	Change
Liberal				19	▲4
UNA				4	▼1
NPC				3	Steady
Nacionalista				2	Steady
KABAKA				1	Steady
Lakas				1	Steady
NUP				1	▼1
Magdiwang				1	Steady
Aksyon				0	Steady
Ang Kapatiran				0	Steady
KKK				0	Steady
PMP				0	Steady
Independent				0	Steady
Valid votes				32	▲2
Invalid votes					
Turnout					
Registered voters					

== Caloocan ==
=== 1st District ===
Incumbent Oscar Malapitan is term-limited and running for mayorship, his son Along Malapitan is the party's nominee. He will face three-term mayor Enrico Echiverri.

2013 Philippine House of Representatives election at Caloocan's 1st district
Party	Candidate	Votes	%
Liberal	Enrico Echiverri	126,209	46.82
UNA	Along Malapitan	113,453	42.09
Independent	Roberto Guanzon	10,443	3.87
Independent	Imelda Pengson	374	0.14
Independent	Maria Hernando	364	0.13
Independent	Milagros Libuton	329	0.12
Independent	Sirgea Villamayor	283	0.10
Independent	Sandro Limpin	193	0.07
Margin of victory		12,756	4.73
Invalid or blank votes		17,904	6.64
Total votes		269,552	100
Liberal gain from UNA			

=== 2nd District ===
Mitzi Cajayon is the incumbent. She will face vice mayor Edgar Erice and former Congressman Luis Asistio.

2013 Navotas legislative election
Party	Candidate	Votes	%
Liberal	Edgar Erice	57,318	38.80
NUP	Mitzi Cajayon	49,976	33.83
NPC	Luis Asistio	26,196	17.73
Ang Kapatiran	Carlo Cabochan	3,346	2.26
Independent	Adoracion Garcia	473	0.32
Margin of victory		7,342	4.97
Invalid or blank votes		10,443	7.06
Total votes		147,742	100
Liberal gain from NUP			

== Las Piñas ==
Mark Villar is the incumbent.

2013 Philippine House of Representatives election at Las Piñas
Party	Candidate	Votes	%
Nacionalista	Mark Villar	148,805	
Independent	Luis Casimiro		
Independent	Filipino Alvarado	2,679	
Total votes			
Nacionalista hold			

== Makati ==
=== 1st District ===
Monique Lagdameo is the incumbent. The district was the tightest race in 2010's legislative election, with Lagdameo enjoying a winning margin of 0.19%.

2013 Philippine House of Representatives election at Makati's 1st district
Party	Candidate	Votes	%
UNA	Monique Yazmin Lagdameo	86,881	70.98
Independent	Virgilio Batalia	8,249	6.74
Ang Kapatiran	Edilberto Cuenca	4,611	3.77
Independent	Miguel Lopez, Jr.	3,182	2.60
Invalid or blank votes		19,476	15.91
Total votes		122,399	100.00
UNA hold			

=== 2nd District ===
Abigail Binay is the incumbent.

2013 Philippine House of Representatives election at Makati's 2nd district
Party	Candidate	Votes	%
UNA	Mar-len Abigail Binay	107,620	83.47
Independent	Joel Sarza	7,319	5.68
Invalid or blank votes		13,992	10.85
Total votes		128,931	100.00
UNA hold			

== Malabon ==
Incumbent Josephine Lacson-Noel is running unopposed.

2013 Philippine House of Representatives election at Malabon
Party	Candidate	Votes	%
NPC	Josephine Lacson-Noel	81,634	100.00
Total votes		81,364	100.00
NPC hold			

== Mandaluyong ==
Neptali Gonzales II is the incumbent.

2013 Philippine House of Representatives election at Mandaluyong
Party	Candidate	Votes	%
Liberal	Neptali Gonzales II	92,950	89.03
Ang Kapatiran	Frank Reyes	9,522	9.12
Independent	Gerard Castillo	1,511	1.45
Independent	Renato Parem	423	0.41
Total votes		104,406	100.00
Liberal hold			

== Manila ==
=== 1st District ===
Benjamin Asilo is the incumbent.

2013 Philippine House of Representatives election at Manila's 1st district
Party	Candidate	Votes	%
Liberal	Benjamin Asilo	82,579	63.61
UNA	Ernesto Dionisio Sr.	44,420	34.22
Independent	Fernando Diaz	2,243	1.73
Independent	Ricardo Bacolod	573	0.44
Total votes		129,815	100.00
Liberal hold			

=== 2nd District ===
Carlo Lopez is the incumbent.

2013 Philippine House of Representatives election at Manila's 2nd district
Party	Candidate	Votes	%
Liberal	Carlo Lopez	55,468	68.82
UNA	Edward Tan	25,128	31.18
Total votes		80,596	100.00
Liberal hold			

=== 3rd District ===
Zenaida Angping is the incumbent.

2013 Philippine House of Representatives election at Manila's 3rd district
Party	Candidate	Votes	%
NPC	Zenaida Angping	50,466	62.18
KKK	Ramon Morales	29,606	36.48
Independent	Alex Garcia	1,091	1.34
Total votes		81,163	100.00
NPC hold			

=== 4th District ===
Incumbent Trisha Bonoan-David is running unopposed.

2013 Philippine House of Representatives election at Manila's 4th district
Party	Candidate	Votes	%
NUP	Trisha Bonoan-David	78,026	100.00
Total votes		78,026	100.00
NUP hold			

=== 5th District ===
Amado Bagatsing is the incumbent. His KABAKA party is affiliated with the United Nationalist Alliance.

2013 Philippine House of Representatives election at Manila's 6th district
Party	Candidate	Votes	%
KABAKA	Amado Bagatsing	94,966	89.05
NPC	Faith Maganto	10,380	9.73
KBL	Mario Cayabyab	1,293	1.21
Total votes		106,639	100.00
KABAKA hold			

=== 6th District ===
Incumbent Rosenda Ocampo's primary opponent is Benny Abante, the erstwhile incumbent whom she defeated in 2010 by a margin of less than 2%.

2013 Philippine House of Representatives election at Manila's 6th district
Party	Candidate	Votes	%
Liberal	Rosenda Ocampo	43,667	51.45
UNA	Benny Abante	40,571	47.80
Independent	Richard Bautista	407	0.48
Independent	Francisco Candaza	225	0.27
Total votes		84,870	100.00
Liberal hold			

== Marikina ==
=== 1st District ===
Incumbent Marcelino Teodoro is running unopposed.

Philippine House of Representatives election at Marikinas 1st district
Party	Candidate	Votes	%
Liberal	Marcelino Teodoro	58,123	89.54
Invalid or blank votes		6,787	10.46
Total votes		64,910	100.00
Liberal hold			

=== 2nd District ===
Romero Federico Quimbo is incumbent.

Philippine House of Representatives election at Marikinas 2nd district
Party	Candidate	Votes	%
Liberal	Romero Federico Quimbo	67,406	88.57
Independent	Albert Bocobo	3,476	4.57
Invalid or blank votes		5,227	6.87
Total votes		76,109	100.00
Liberal hold			

== Muntinlupa ==
Rodolfo Biazon is the incumbent.

2013 Philippine House of Representatives election at Muntinlupa
Party	Candidate	Votes	%
Liberal	Rodolfo Biazon	101,113	75.55
NPC	Emerson Espeleta	25,783	19.27
Independent	Santiago Carlos, Jr.	4,020	3.00
Independent	Rafael Burgos	1,671	1.25
Ang Kapatiran	Domingo Tambuatco	1,241	0.93
Total votes		133,828	100.00
Liberal hold			

== Navotas ==
Toby Tiangco is the incumbent. He is under Partido Navoteño, the ruling local party, which will contest this election at the banner of the United Nationalist Alliance. (He is also UNA's national secretary-general.)

2013 Navotas legislative election
Party	Candidate	Votes	%
UNA	Toby Tiangco	69,107	80.21
Liberal	Rico De Guzman	17,048	19.79
Margin of victory		52,059	60.42
Total votes		86,155	100.00
UNA hold			

== Parañaque ==
=== 1st District ===
Incumbent Edwin Olivarez is running for mayor against Benjo Bernabe; his brother Eric Olivarez is his party's nominee.

2013 Philippine House of Representatives election at Parañaque's 1st district
Party	Candidate	Votes	%
Liberal	Eric Olivarez	50,981	62.81
Nacionalista	Eduardo Zialcita	28,651	35.30
Independent	Florante Romey, Jr.	1,533	1.89
Total votes		81,165	100.00
Liberal hold			

=== 2nd District ===
Incumbent Roilo Golez is term limited. His party nominates former mayor Joey Marquez, however he is running as independent. Marquez will be challenged by incumbent vice mayor Gustavo Tambunting.

2013 Philippine House of Representatives election at Parañaque's 2nd district
Party	Candidate	Votes	%
UNA	Gustavo Tambunting	57,471	53.03
Independent	Joey Marquez	47,912	44.21
Independent	Pacifico Rosal	2,992	2.76
Total votes		108,375	100.00
UNA gain from Independent			

== Pasay ==
Imelda Calixto-Rubiano is the incumbent.

2013 Philippine House of Representatives election at Pasay
Party	Candidate	Votes	%
Liberal	Imelda Calixto-Rubiano	110,144	81.97
NPC	Santiago Quial	20,457	15.22
Independent	Pastor de Castro, Jr.	3,771	2.81
Total votes		134,372	100.00
Liberal hold			

== Pasig ==
Roman Romulo is the incumbent.

2013 Philippine House of Representatives election at Pasig
Party	Candidate	Votes	%
Liberal	Roman Romulo	217,345	87.43
UNA	Orlando Salatandre, Jr.	31,256	12.57
Total votes		248,601	100.00
Liberal hold			

== Quezon City ==
The second district of Quezon City was redistricted into three districts. The district that will continue to carry the "second district" name is the one surrounding the Batasang Pambansa Complex, immediately south of the La Mesa Dam watershed. The two new districts are designated as the fifth and sixth districts. The other districts that were not affected by the redistricting (first, third and fourth) retained their nomenclatures.

=== 1st District ===
Incumbent Vincent "Bingbong" Crisologo is on his last term, having served as Representative of the 1st District from 2004 to 2013.; his wife Rita is his party's nominee. she was lost to councilor Francisco Calalay.

2013 Philippine House of Representatives election at Quezon City's 1st district
Party	Candidate	Votes	%
Liberal	Francisco Calalay	62,226	47.70
UNA	Rita Crisologo	56,604	43.39
Independent	Gary Jamile	2,095	1.60
Margin of victory		5,622	4.31%
Valid ballots		120,925	92.70
Invalid or blank votes		9,529	7.30
Total votes		130,454	100.00
Liberal gain from UNA			

=== 2nd District ===
The second district of Quezon City was redistricted into three districts. The district that will continue to carry the "second district" name is the one surrounding the Batasang Pambansa Complex, immediately south of the La Mesa Dam watershed.

Winston Castelo, the incumbent 2nd district representative, is running here.

2013 Philippine House of Representatives election at Quezon City's 2nd district
Party	Candidate	Votes	%
Liberal	Winston Castelo	76,562	56.47
Independent	Ismael Mathay III	44,043	32.49
Margin of victory		32,519	23.99%
Valid ballots		120,605	88.96
Invalid or blank votes		14,969	11.04
Total votes		135,574	100.00
Liberal hold			

=== 3rd District ===
Jorge Banal, Jr. is the incumbent, his opponent is former congressman Matias Defensor, Jr.

2013 Philippine House of Representatives election at Quezon City's 3rd district
Party	Candidate	Votes	%
Liberal	Jorge Banal, Jr.	48,822	52.05
UNA	Matias Defensor, Jr.	38,909	41.48
Margin of victory		9,913	10.57%
Valid ballots		87,731	93.54
Invalid or blank votes		6,062	6.46
Total votes		93,793	
Liberal hold			

=== 4th District ===
Feliciano Belmonte, Jr., the Speaker of the House of Representatives, is the incumbent.

2013 Philippine House of Representatives election at Quezon City's 4th district
Party	Candidate	Votes	%
Liberal	Feliciano Belmonte, Jr.	93,888	76.64
PMP	Hans Palacios	9,447	7.71
Margin of victory		84,441	68.93%
Valid ballots		103,335	84.35
Invalid or blank votes		19,167	15.65
Total votes		122,502	100.00
Liberal hold			

=== 5th District ===
The 5th district comes from old 2nd district's northernmost area, comprising most of Novaliches.

Actor and councilor Alfred Vargas won against former congresswoman Mary Ann Susano and former Congressman Dante Liban.

2013 Philippine House of Representatives election at Quezon City's 5th district
Party	Candidate	Votes	%
Liberal	Alfred Vargas	64,701	56.29
KKK	Mary Ann Susano	24,819	21.59
UNA	Dante Liban	10,563	9.19
Aksyon	Isagani Oro	4,495	3.91
Margin of victory		39,882	34.70%
Valid ballots		104,578	90.98
Invalid or blank votes		10,369	9.02
Total votes		114,947	100.00
Liberal win (new seat)			

=== 6th District ===
The 6th district comprises the old 2nd district's southernmost parts (Balintawak, Southern Portion of Novaliches and Tandang Sora areas). Lawyer Christopher "Kit" Belmonte, who ranked second to Winston Castelo in the 2010 polls), is running unopposed.

2013 Philippine House of Representatives election at Quezon City's 6th district
Party	Candidate	Votes	%
Liberal	Christopher Belmonte	78,887	79.45
Valid ballots		78,887	79.45
Invalid or blank votes		20,368	20.52
Total votes		99,255	100.00
Liberal win (new seat)			

== San Juan ==
Incumbent JV Ejercito is running for the Senate under the United Nationalist Alliance (UNA); his UNA-affiliated Partido Magdiwang nominated former representative Ronaldo Zamora as their nominee. His opponent is Councilor Jannah Ejercito, daughter of Jessie Estrada, brother of Joseph Estrada, who is Ejercito's father.

2013 Philippine House of Representatives election at San Juan
Party	Candidate	Votes	%
Magdiwang	Ronaldo Zamora	20,183	51.52
NPC	Jannah Ejercito	18,994	48.48
Margin of victory		1,189	3.04
Total votes		39,177	100.00
Magdiwang gain from UNA			

== Taguig and Pateros ==
Taguig's 1st Sangguniang Panlungsod (SP) district and Pateros collectively elect one seat in the House of Representatives. Taguig's 2nd SP district is allocated another seat.

=== 1st District ===
Arnel Cerafica is the incumbent. He will be facing off against Councilor Gigi Valenzuela de Mesa. Cerafica is also nominated by local party Kilusang Diwa ng Taguig.

Philippine House of Representative election at Taguig's 1st District
Party	Candidate	Votes	%
Liberal	Arnel Cerafica	37,556	63.81
Nacionalista	Gigi Valenzuela de Mesa	17,686	30.05
Margin of victory		19,870	33.76
Invalid or blank votes		3,614	6.14
Total votes		58,856	100.00
Liberal hold			

Note: Result include Pateros.

=== 2nd District ===
Sigfrido Tiñga is the incumbent but decided not to run in any position due to his personal reason. Former Councilor Henry Dueñas Jr. will take his place to be a congressman. He will facing off against TV/Movie Director and Barangay Chairman of Fort Bonifacio Lino Cayetano.

Philippine House of Representative election at Taguig's 2nd District
Party	Candidate	Votes	%
Nacionalista	Lino Edgardo S. Cayetano	33,177	53.22
NPC	Henry Dueñas Jr.	26,238	42.02
Margin of victory		6,939	11.13%
Invalid or blank votes		2,930	4.70
Total votes		62,345	100.00
Nacionalista gain from Liberal			

== Valenzuela ==
=== First district ===
Incumbent Rexlon Gatchalian is running for the mayorship; his brother, Mayor Sherwin Gatchalian, is his party's nominee.

2013 Philippine House of Representatives election at Valenzuela's 1st district
Party	Candidate	Votes	%
NPC	Sherwin Gatchalian	67,992	70.05
Lakas	Ritche Cuadra	23,805	24.53
Invalid or blank votes		5,265	5.42
Total votes		97,062	100.00
NPC hold			

=== Second district ===
Magtanggol Gunigundo is the incumbent. He will be facing off against councilor Shalani Soledad-Romulo.

2013 Philippine House of Representatives election at Valenzuela's 2nd district
Party	Candidate	Votes	%
Lakas	Magtanggol Gunigundo	56,542	48.73
Liberal	Shalani Soledad	53,800	46.37
Independent	Pablo Hernandez III	650	0.56
Invalid or blank votes		5,029	4.33
Total votes		116,021	100.00
Lakas hold			
