= 2010 Philippine House of Representatives elections in Metro Manila =

Philippine House of Representatives elections in Metro Manila, 2010
- May 10, 2010

30 seats of Metro Manila in the House of Representatives
	First party	Second party	Third party
Party	Liberal	Nacionalista	Lakas–Kampi
Seats won	14	3	5
Popular vote	1,172,287	876,235	657,348
Percentage	29.04%	21.71%	16.28%
	Fourth party	Fifth party	Sixth party
Party	NPC	PMP	PDP–Laban
Seats won	3	2	2
Popular vote	380,632	225,009	123,577
Percentage	9.43%	5.57%	3.06%
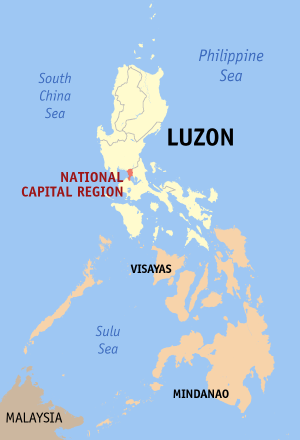
- Location of Metro Manila within the country.

Elections were held in the National Capital Region (Metro Manila) for seats in the House of Representatives of the Philippines on May 10, 2010.

The candidate with the most votes won that district's seat for the 15th Congress of the Philippines.

== Summary ==
Party	Popular vote	%	Seats won
Liberal	1,172,287	29.04%	14
Nacionalista	876,345	21.71%	3
Lakas–Kampi	657,348	16.28%	5
NPC	380,632	9.43%	3
PMP*	225,009	5.57%	2
PDP–Laban	123,577	3.06%	2
KABAKA	70,852	1.76%	1
Ang Kapatiran	45,631	1.13%	0
Bagumbayan	40,684	1.01%	0
Bigkis	37,138	0.92%	0
Lingkod Taguig	16,990	0.42%	0
KKK**	11,076	0.27%	0
KBL	4,494	0.11%	0
Bangon Pilipinas	3,773	0.09%	0
PGRP	991	0.02%	0
Buklod	876	0.02%	0
Independent	369,412	9.15%	0
Valid votes	4,037,005	91.95%	30
Invalid votes	353,575	8.05%	
Turnout	4,390,580	71.06%	
Registered voters	6,178,966	100.00%	

*includes Partido Navoteño and Partido Magdiwang.
**excludes joint KKK/Liberal Party ticket.

== Caloocan ==
=== 1st district ===
Incumbent Oscar Malapitan of the Nacionalista Party won re-election to a third term.

Candidate	Party	Votes	%
Oscar Malapitan (incumbent)	Nacionalista Party	163,150	66.61
Luis Tito Varela	Liberal Party	48,333	19.73
Roberto Guanzon	Independent	12,112	4.95
Ernesto Ray Adalem	Independent	10,444	4.26
Gualberto Bacolod	Independent	8,026	3.28
Jaime Regalario	Independent	2,866	1.17
Total		244,931	100.00
Valid votes		244,931	90.39
Invalid/blank votes		26,045	9.61
Total votes		270,976	100.00
Nacionalista Party hold			
Source: ibanangayon.ph

=== 2nd district ===
Incumbent Mitch Cajayon-Uy of Lakas–Kampi–CMD was re-elected to a second term.

The result of the election is under protest in the House of Representatives Electoral Tribunal.

Candidate	Party	Votes	%
Mitch Cajayon-Uy (incumbent)	Lakas–Kampi–CMD	77,364	53.08
Antonio Mariano Almeda	Nacionalista Party	35,546	24.39
Carlos Cabochan	Ang Kapatiran	16,943	11.63
Ma. Milagros Mercado	Independent	13,306	9.13
John Santos	Liberal Party	1,336	0.92
Tany Catacutan	Independent	723	0.50
Adoracion Garcia	Philippine Green Republican Party	304	0.21
Enrique Cube	Independent	217	0.15
Total		145,739	100.00
Valid votes		145,739	92.25
Invalid/blank votes		12,246	7.75
Total votes		157,985	100.00
Lakas–Kampi–CMD hold			
Source: ibanangayon.ph

== Las Piñas ==
Incumbent Cynthia Villar of the Nacionalista Party was term-limited. The Nacionalista Party nominated Villar's son, Mark Villar, who won the election.

Candidate	Party	Votes	%
Mark Villar	Nacionalista Party	155,343	86.39
Francisco Antonio Jr.	Kapayapaan, Kaunlaran at Katarungan	11,908	6.62
Zusarah Veloria	Independent	8,873	4.93
Filipino Alvarado	Independent	3,692	2.05
Total		179,816	100.00
Valid votes		179,816	84.58
Invalid/blank votes		32,778	15.42
Total votes		212,594	100.00
Nacionalista Party hold			
Source: ibanangayon.ph

== Makati ==
=== 1st district ===
Incumbent Teodoro Locsin Jr. of PDP–Laban was term-limited. PDP–Laban nominated city councilor Monique Lagdameo, while Locsin endorsed his wife Maria Lourdes, who was nominated by the Liberal Party. Lagdameo won the election against Maria Lourdes Locsin, former Philippine Tourism Authority general manager Robert Dean Barbers (Independent) and two other candidates.

The result of the election is under protest in the House of Representatives Electoral Tribunal.

Candidate	Party	Votes	%
Monique Lagdameo	PDP–Laban	42,102	33.52
Maria Lourdes Locsin	Liberal Party	41,860	33.32
Robert Dean Barbers	Independent	25,990	20.69
Oscar Ibay	Bigkis Pinoy	14,993	11.94
Oswaldo Carbonell	Kilusang Bagong Lipunan	668	0.53
Total		125,613	100.00
Valid votes		125,613	92.24
Invalid/blank votes		10,564	7.76
Total votes		136,177	100.00
PDP–Laban hold			
Source: Commission on Elections

=== 2nd district ===
Incumbent Abigail Binay of PDP–Laban won re-election to a second term.

The result of the election is under protest in the House of Representatives Electoral Tribunal.

Candidate	Party	Votes	%
Abigail Binay (incumbent)	PDP–Laban	84,152	62.51
Ernesto Aspillaga	Nacionalista Party	36,621	27.20
Christian John Montes	Kilusang Bagong Lipunan	13,857	10.29
Total		134,630	100.00
Valid votes		134,630	92.02
Invalid/blank votes		11,682	7.98
Total votes		146,312	100.00
PDP–Laban hold			
Source: Commission on Elections

== Malabon ==
Malabon was redistricted in 2007, resulting in the city being separated from Malabon–Navotas' lone district to create its own legislative district.

Incumbent Malabon–Navotas' lone district representative Josephine Lacson-Noel of the Nationalist People's Coalition won the election. Lacson-Noel was elected to her first full term after the House of Representatives Electoral Tribunal ruled that she won the 2007 election in Malabon–Navotas' lone district against Alvin Sandoval.

Candidate	Party	Votes	%
Josephine Lacson-Noel	Nationalist People's Coalition	52,815	40.25
Arnold Vicencio	Pwersa ng Masang Pilipino	42,961	32.74
Ricky Sandoval	Lakas–Kampi–CMD	27,506	20.96
Mark Allan Jay Yambao	Lakas–Kampi–CMD	7,640	5.82
Bobby Genorga	Independent	283	0.22
Total		131,205	100.00
Valid votes		131,205	94.52
Invalid/blank votes		7,600	5.48
Total votes		138,805	100.00
Nationalist People's Coalition gain			
Source: Commission on Elections

== Mandaluyong ==
Incumbent Neptali Gonzales II won re-election to a second term unopposed. Gonzales initially ran under Lakas–Kampi–CMD, but later joined the Liberal Party.

Candidate	Party	Votes	%
Neptali Gonzales II (incumbent)	Liberal Party	114,971	100.00
Total		114,971	100.00
Valid votes		114,971	84.26
Invalid/blank votes		21,474	15.74
Total votes		136,445	100.00
Liberal Party hold			
Source: Commission on Elections

== Manila ==
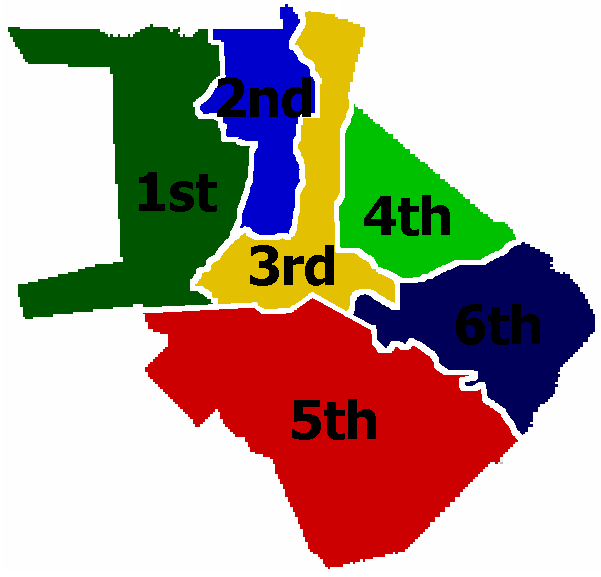
Manila divided into the six legislative districts.

The Kapayapaan, Kaunlaran at Katarungan party headed by incumbent mayor and candidate Alfredo Lim is in coalition with the Liberal Party, although candidate and former mayor Lito Atienza's certificate of candidacy states that he is the Liberal Party's candidate for mayor. The COMELEC eventually classified Atienza as an independent.

=== 1st district ===
Incumbent Benjamin Asilo of the Liberal Party and Kapayapaan, Kaunlaran at Katarungan won re-election to a second term against Mina Nierva of Lakas–Kampi–CMD, Arlene Koa of the Nacionalista Party and Asenso Manileño and two other candidates.

Former representative Ernesto Nieva initially ran as the candidate of Lakas–Kampi–CMD, but died on February 16, 2010 due to cardiac arrest. Nieva was substituted by his daughter Mina.

Candidate	Party	Votes	%
Benjamin Asilo (incumbent)	Liberal Party/Kapayapaan, Kaunlaran at Katarungan	82,249	58.27
Mina Nieva	Lakas–Kampi–CMD	40,880	28.96
Arlene Koa	Nacionalista Party/Asenso Manileño	14,090	9.98
Fernando Diaz	Kilusang Bagong Lipunan	3,500	2.48
Ranilo Dacay	Independent	441	0.31
Total		141,160	100.00
Valid votes		141,160	93.92
Invalid/blank votes		9,135	6.08
Total votes		150,295	100.00
Liberal Party/Kapayapaan, Kaunlaran at Katarungan hold			
Source: Commission on Elections

=== 2nd district ===
Incumbent Jaime Lopez of Lakas–Kampi–CMD was term limited. Lopez' son, city councilor Carlo Lopez of the Liberal Party and Kapayapaan, Kaunlaran at Katarungan won the election against city councilor Rolan Valeriano of the Nacionalista Party and two other candidates.

Candidate	Party	Votes	%
Carlo Lopez	Liberal Party/Kapayapaan, Kaunlaran at Katarungan	47,710	55.51
Rolan Valeriano	Nacionalista Party	37,141	43.21
Jaime Balmas	Independent	902	1.05
Jeffry John Alacre	Independent	203	0.24
Total		85,956	100.00
Valid votes		85,956	92.37
Invalid/blank votes		7,097	7.63
Total votes		93,053	100.00
Liberal Party/Kapayapaan, Kaunlaran at Katarungan gain from Lakas–Kampi–CMD			
Source: Commission on Elections

=== 3rd district ===
Incumbent Zenaida Angping of the Nationalist People's Coalition won re-election to a second term.

Candidate	Party	Votes	%
Zenaida Angping (incumbent)	Nationalist People's Coalition	62,085	64.06
Manuel Zarcal	Independent	32,634	33.67
Erlinda Reyes	Independent	912	0.94
Cristina Zamora	Independent	512	0.53
Wally Dizon	Independent	389	0.40
Rodolfo Flores	Independent	381	0.39
Total		96,913	100.00
Valid votes		96,913	94.00
Invalid/blank votes		6,182	6.00
Total votes		103,095	100.00
Nationalist People's Coalition hold			
Source: Commission on Elections

=== 4th district ===
Incumbent Trisha Bonoan-David of Lakas–Kampi–CMD won re-election to a second term.

Candidate	Party	Votes	%
Trisha Bonoan-David (incumbent)	Lakas–Kampi–CMD	56,769	55.13
Rodolfo Bacani	Liberal Party	46,206	44.87
Total		102,975	100.00
Valid votes		102,975	94.96
Invalid/blank votes		5,464	5.04
Total votes		108,439	100.00
Lakas–Kampi–CMD hold			
Source: Commission on Elections

=== 5th district ===
Incumbent Amado Bagatsing of Kabalikat ng Bayan sa Kaunlaran won re-election to a second term against former representative Joey Hizon of the Nacionalista Party and two other candidates. Bagatsing was also affiliated with Lito Atienza's Buhayin ang Maynila coalition, which is supported by Joseph Estrada's Pwersa ng Masang Pilipino.

Candidate	Party	Votes	%
Amado Bagatsing (incumbent)	Kabalikat ng Bayan sa Kaunlaran	70,852	59.04
Joey Hizon	Nacionalista Party	47,902	39.92
Rodicindo Rodriguez II	Independent	626	0.52
Jayson Española	Independent	618	0.52
Total		119,998	100.00
Valid votes		119,998	92.92
Invalid/blank votes		9,149	7.08
Total votes		129,147	100.00
Kabalikat ng Bayan sa Kaunlaran hold			
Source: Commission on Elections

=== 6th district ===
Incumbent Benny Abante of Lakas–Kampi–CMD ran for re-election to a third term. Abante was also affiliated with Lito Atienza's Buhayin ang Maynila coalition, which is supported by Joseph Estrada's Pwersa ng Masang Pilipino.

Abante was defeated by former representative Rosenda Ann Ocampo of the Liberal Party and Kapayapaan, Kaunlaran at Katarungan. Former Manila vice mayor Danny Lacuna also ran in the election as a candidate of the Nacionalista Party and Asenso Manileño.

The result of the election is under protest in the House of Representatives Electoral Tribunal.

Candidate	Party	Votes	%
Rosenda Ann Ocampo	Liberal Party/Kapayapaan, Kaunlaran at Katarungan	39,985	38.63
Benny Abante (incumbent)	Lakas–Kampi–CMD	38,113	36.82
Danny Lacuna	Nacionalista Party/Asenso Manileño	24,866	24.03
Ramon Villanueva	Independent	204	0.20
Joven Yuson	Independent	160	0.15
Marlo Gerardo Artacho	Philippine Green Republican Party	96	0.09
Ronaldo Tibig	Bigkis Pinoy	76	0.07
Total		103,500	100.00
Valid votes		103,500	95.70
Invalid/blank votes		4,654	4.30
Total votes		108,154	100.00
Liberal Party/Kapayapaan, Kaunlaran at Katarungan gain from Lakas–Kampi–CMD			
Source: Commission on Elections

== Marikina ==
=== 1st district ===
Incumbent Marcelino Teodoro won re-election to a second term as an independent.

Candidate	Party	Votes	%
Marcelino Teodoro (incumbent)	Independent	47,425	67.48
Samuel Ferriol	Liberal Party	22,232	31.63
Garizaldy dela Paz	Independent	338	0.48
Alfredo Gerardo Fajardo	Independent	175	0.25
Daniel Casuga	Independent	110	0.16
Total		70,280	100.00
Valid votes		70,280	96.04
Invalid/blank votes		2,897	3.96
Total votes		73,177	100.00
Independent hold			
Source: Commission on Elections

=== 2nd district ===
Incumbent Del de Guzman of the Liberal Party was term-limited. The Liberal Party nominated former Pag-IBIG Fund CEO Miro Quimbo, who won the election.

Candidate	Party	Votes	%
Miro Quimbo	Liberal Party	45,690	56.77
Donn Carlo Favis	Bagumbayan–VNP	13,073	16.24
Romeo Candazo	Pwersa ng Masang Pilipino	10,883	13.52
Hilario Punzalan	Independent	4,744	5.89
Adjuthor de Guzman	Independent	3,704	4.60
Eduardo Francisco	Independent	1,515	1.88
Benjamin Roberto Baretto	Independent	616	0.77
Rogelio Serrano	Independent	149	0.19
Felizardo Bulaong	Independent	112	0.14
Total		80,486	100.00
Valid votes		80,486	93.25
Invalid/blank votes		5,823	6.75
Total votes		86,309	100.00
Liberal Party hold			
Source: Commission on Elections

== Muntinlupa ==
Term-limited incumbent Ruffy Biazon of the Liberal Party ran for the Senate. The Liberal Party nominated Biazon's father, term-limited senator Rodolfo Biazon, who won against former Press Secretary Dong Puno of the Nationalist People's Coalition and five other candidates.

Candidate	Party	Votes	%
Rodolfo Biazon	Liberal Party	82,128	46.00
Dong Puno	Nationalist People's Coalition	48,763	27.31
Ermie Espeleta	Independent	34,644	19.40
Rey Bulay	Independent	9,903	5.55
Rafael Burgos	Independent	2,001	1.12
Rodolfo Villoria	Bangon Pilipinas	934	0.52
Herminio Sorilla	Independent	180	0.10
Total		178,553	100.00
Valid votes		178,553	93.30
Invalid/blank votes		12,815	6.70
Total votes		191,368	100.00
Liberal Party hold			
Source: Commission on Elections

== Navotas ==
Navotas was redistricted in 2007, resulting in the city being separated from Malabon–Navotas' lone district to create its own legislative district.

Term-limited Navotas mayor Toby Tiangco of Partido Navoteño won the election unopposed.

Candidate	Party	Votes	%
Toby Tiangco	Partido Navoteño	76,276	100.00
Total		76,276	100.00
Valid votes		76,276	84.16
Invalid/blank votes		14,354	15.84
Total votes		90,630	100.00
Partido Navoteño gain			
Source: Commission on Elections

== Parañaque ==
=== 1st district ===
Incumbent Eduardo Zialcita of the Nacionalista Party was term-limited. Former Laguna vice governor Edwin Olivarez of the Liberal Party won the election.

The result of the election is under protest in the House of Representatives Electoral Tribunal.

Candidate	Party	Votes	%
Edwin Olivarez	Liberal Party	43,005	53.30
Rolando Bernabe	Lakas–Kampi–CMD	25,295	31.35
Delfin Wenceslao Jr.	Independent	6,813	8.44
Epimaco Densing III	Nationalist People's Coalition	2,897	3.59
Edison Javier	Independent	2,581	3.20
Fortunata Magsombol	Independent	101	0.13
Total		80,692	100.00
Valid votes		80,692	92.67
Invalid/blank votes		6,381	7.33
Total votes		87,073	100.00
Liberal Party gain from Nacionalista Party			
Source: Commission on Elections

=== 2nd district ===
Incumbent Roilo Golez won re-election to a third term. Golez initially ran as an independent, but later joined the Liberal Party.

Candidate	Party	Votes	%
Roilo Golez (incumbent)	Liberal Party	98,940	95.99
Pedro Montaño	Pwersa ng Masang Pilipino	4,135	4.01
Total		103,075	100.00
Valid votes		103,075	87.88
Invalid/blank votes		14,209	12.12
Total votes		117,284	100.00
Liberal Party hold			
Source: Commission on Elections

== Pasay ==
Incumbent Jose Antonio Roxas of Lakas–Kampi–CMD ran for re-election to a second term, but was defeated by city councilor Emi Rubiano of the Liberal Party.

Candidate	Party	Votes	%
Emi Rubiano	Liberal Party	66,443	41.20
Jose Antonio Roxas (incumbent)	Lakas–Kampi–CMD	53,304	33.05
Allan Panaligan	Pwersa ng Masang Pilipino	32,857	20.37
Rica-Elah Hortaleza	Bigkis Pinoy	8,667	5.37
Total		161,271	100.00
Valid votes		161,271	87.83
Invalid/blank votes		22,347	12.17
Total votes		183,618	100.00
Liberal Party gain from Lakas–Kampi–CMD			
Source: Commission on Elections

== Pasig ==
Incumbent Roman Romulo of Lakas–Kampi–CMD won re-election to a second term.

Candidate	Party	Votes	%
Roman Romulo (incumbent)	Lakas–Kampi–CMD	209,281	90.23
Francisco Rivera Jr.	Independent	22,659	9.77
Total		231,940	100.00
Valid votes		231,940	88.67
Invalid/blank votes		29,627	11.33
Total votes		261,567	100.00
Lakas–Kampi–CMD hold			
Source: Commission on Elections

== Quezon City ==
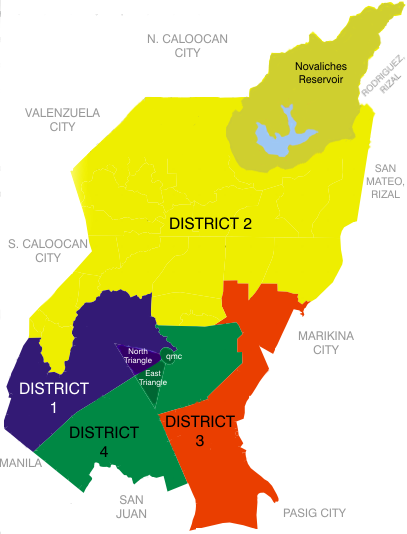
Map of Quezon City's legislative districts.

=== 1st district ===
Incumbent Vincent Crisologo of the Nacionalista Party won re-election to a third term.

Vivienne Tan, daughter of business tycoon Lucio Tan, ran as an independent candidate. Tan was disqualified on April 23, 2010, by the Court of Appeals for not being a Filipino citizen, but the ruling was subject to appeal.

The result of the election is under protest in the House of Representatives Electoral Tribunal.

Candidate	Party	Votes	%
Vincent Crisologo (incumbent)	Nacionalista Party	78,610	60.78
Vivienne Tan	Independent	30,599	23.66
Elizabeth Delarmente	Nationalist People's Coalition	19,671	15.21
Benjamin Mariquit	Independent	462	0.36
Total		129,342	100.00
Valid votes		129,342	94.78
Invalid/blank votes		7,127	5.22
Total votes		136,469	100.00
Nacionalista Party hold			
Source: Commission on Elections

=== 2nd district ===
Incumbent Mary Ann Susano of Pwersa ng Masang Pilipino (PMP) ran for Mayor of Quezon City. The PMP nominated city councilor Allan Butch Francisco, who was defeated by city councilor Winston Castelo of the Liberal Party.

Candidate	Party	Votes	%
Winston Castelo	Liberal Party	129,660	37.39
Kit Belmonte	Independent	105,101	30.31
Allan Butch Francisco	Pwersa ng Masang Pilipino	38,582	11.13
Dante Liban	Ang Kapatiran	28,688	8.27
Ismael Mathay III	Independent	26,383	7.61
Voltaire Liban III	Independent	15,944	4.60
Myrleon Peralta	Buklod	876	0.25
Walter Jimenez	Philippine Green Republican Party	591	0.17
Fernando Uy	Independent	367	0.11
Norma Nueva	Independent	326	0.09
Dionisio Rellosa Jr.	Independent	253	0.07
Total		346,771	100.00
Valid votes		346,771	92.50
Invalid/blank votes		28,121	7.50
Total votes		374,892	100.00
Liberal Party gain from Pwersa ng Masang Pilipino			
Source: Commission on Elections

=== 3rd district ===
Incumbent Matias Defensor Jr. of Lakas–Kampi–CMD ran for re-election to a third term, but was defeated by city councilor Jorge John Bernal Jr. of the Liberal Party.

The result of the election is under protest in the House of Representatives Electoral Tribunal.

Candidate	Party	Votes	%
Jorge John Bernal Jr.	Liberal Party	37,408	38.02
Matias Defensor Jr. (incumbent)	Lakas–Kampi–CMD	30,887	31.39
Franz Pumaren	Nationalist People's Coalition	27,611	28.06
Catherine Violago	Bagumbayan–VNP	2,254	2.29
Pedrito Espin	Independent	231	0.23
Total		98,391	100.00
Valid votes		98,391	95.06
Invalid/blank votes		5,116	4.94
Total votes		103,507	100.00
Liberal Party gain from Lakas–Kampi–CMD			
Source: Commission on Elections

=== 4th district ===
Incumbent Nanette Castelo-Daza of the Liberal Party was term-limited. The Liberal Party nominated former representative Feliciano Belmonte Jr., who won the election.

Candidate	Party	Votes	%
Feliciano Belmonte Jr.	Liberal Party	99,813	78.42
Don Emil de Castro	Lakas–Kampi–CMD	23,476	18.44
Albert Hans Palacios	Pwersa ng Masang Pilipino	3,992	3.14
Total		127,281	100.00
Valid votes		127,281	87.38
Invalid/blank votes		18,382	12.62
Total votes		145,663	100.00
Liberal Party hold			
Source: Commission on Elections

== San Juan ==
Incumbent Ronaldo Zamora of the Nacionalista Party was term-limited. Term-limited San Juan mayor JV Ejercito of Pwersa ng Masang Pilipino won the election unopposed.

Candidate	Party	Votes	%
JV Ejercito	Pwersa ng Masang Pilipino	47,840	100.00
Total		47,840	100.00
Valid votes		47,840	82.08
Invalid/blank votes		10,444	17.92
Total votes		58,284	100.00
Pwersa ng Masang Pilipino gain from Nacionalista Party			
Source: Commission on Elections

== Taguig and Pateros ==
Taguig is divided into two districts: its first district also includes Pateros. Hence, the first district is called the "District of Taguig-Pateros" and the second district is the "District of Taguig."

=== Taguig–Pateros ===
Incumbent Lani Cayetano of the Nacionalista Party ran for Mayor of Taguig. The Nacionalista Party nominated Cayetano's brother in law Rene Carl, who was defeated by former city councilor Arnel Cerafica of the Liberal Party.

Candidate	Party	Votes	%
Arnel Cerafica	Liberal Party	65,264	60.19
Rene Carl Cayetano	Nacionalista Party	42,558	39.25
Luis Cruz Jr.	Independent	349	0.32
Joselito Johannes Gabriel	Independent	256	0.24
Total		108,427	100.00
Valid votes		108,427	94.75
Invalid/blank votes		6,012	5.25
Total votes		114,439	100.00
Liberal Party gain from Nacionalista Party			
Source: Commission on Elections

=== Taguig ===
Incumbent Henry Dueñas Jr. of Lakas–Kampi–CMD retired. Term-limited Taguig mayor Sigfrido Tiñga of the Liberal Party won the election.

On February 28, 2010, Angelito Reyes, son of Secretary of Energy Angelo Reyes, is declared the winner of the 2007 election by the House of Representatives Electoral Tribunal (HRET), with the HRET ruling that Reyes defeated Henry Duenas, Jr. by a margin of 57 votes; the Board of Canvassers originally declared Duenas the winner with 28,564 votes over Reyes' 27,107 for a margin of 1,457.

Candidate	Party	Votes	%
Sigfrido Tiñga	Liberal Party	61,483	60.62
Angelito Reyes	Lingkod Taguig	16,990	16.75
Arvin Ian Alit	Nacionalista Party	16,184	15.96
James Layug	Independent	6,637	6.54
Robinson Lumontod Jr.	Independent	135	0.13
Total		101,429	100.00
Valid votes		101,429	94.91
Invalid/blank votes		5,438	5.09
Total votes		106,867	100.00
Liberal Party gain from Lakas–Kampi–CMD			
Source: Commission on Elections

== Valenzuela ==
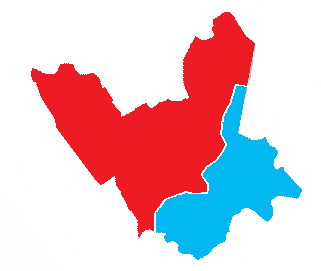
Legislative districts of Valenzuela City. Areas shown in red represent the first district; blue represent second district.

=== 1st district ===
Incumbent Rex Gatchalian of the Nationalist People's Coalition won re-election to a second term.

Candidate	Party	Votes	%
Rex Gatchalian (incumbent)	Nationalist People's Coalition	74,977	90.43
Maria Elisa Mendoza	Independent	7,933	9.57
Total		82,910	100.00
Valid votes		82,910	92.94
Invalid/blank votes		6,298	7.06
Total votes		89,208	100.00
Nationalist People's Coalition hold			
Source: Commission on Elections

=== 2nd district ===
Incumbent Magi Gunigundo of Lakas–Kampi–CMD won re-election to a second term.

Candidate	Party	Votes	%
Magi Gunigundo (incumbent)	Lakas–Kampi–CMD	66,495	64.10
Carlitos Tiquia	Nationalist People's Coalition	37,237	35.90
Total		103,732	100.00
Valid votes		103,732	95.26
Invalid/blank votes		5,161	4.74
Total votes		108,893	100.00
Lakas–Kampi–CMD hold			
Source: Commission on Elections
