= 2016 Taguig local elections =

4th city election in Taguig

2016 Taguig mayoral elections
← 2013	May 9, 2016	2019 →
- Turnout: 70.7%
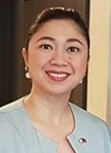
Nominee	Ma. Laarni "Lani" Cayetano
Party	Nacionalista
Running mate	Ricardo "Ading" Cruz Jr.
Popular vote	224,981
Percentage	100.00
Mayor before election
Ma. Laarni "Lani" Cayetano
Nacionalista
Elected mayor
Ma. Laarni "Lani" Cayetano
Nacionalista

Local elections in Taguig were held on May 9, 2016, within the Philippine general election. The voters elected for the elective local posts in the city: the mayor, vice mayor, two District representatives, and councilors, eight in each of the city's two legislative districts.

== Background ==
Mayor Ma. Laarni "Lani" Cayetano was on her second term, and she ran for re-election for third term unopposed. Initially, Rommel Carlos Tiñga Jr., cousin of former Mayor Sigfrido "Freddie" Tiñga, was supposed to be her opponent but later bowed out of the race, leaving her running in mayorship without any opponent.

Vice Mayor Ricardo "Ading" Cruz Jr.was on his first term, and he ran for re-election unopposed.

First District Rep. Arnel Cerafica was on his second term, and he ran for re-election for third term. She faced Gloria Cabrera.

Second District Rep. Lino Edgar Cayetano was on his first term, and he initially declared his intention to run for second term, but he withdrew after. He was replaced by his sister, Senator Pilar Juliana "Pia" Cayetano. Cayetano was challenged by Councilor Michelle Anne Gonzales.

== Results ==
=== For Representative ===
==== First District ====
Rep. Arnel Cerafica defeated Gloria Cabrera.

Congressional Elections in Taguig's First District
Party	Candidate	Votes	%
Liberal	Arnel Cerafica	81,143	89.22
PBM	Gloria Cabrera	9,804	10.78
Total votes		90,947	100.00
Liberal hold			

==== Second District ====
Senator Pilar Juliana "Pia" Cayetano defeated Councilor Michelle Anne "Cheche" Gonzales.

Congressional Elections in Taguig's Second District
Party	Candidate	Votes	%
Nacionalista	Pilar Juliana "Pia" Cayetano	93,813	69.38
UNA	Michelle Anne "Cheche" Gonzales	41,396	30.62
Total votes		135,209	100.00
Nacionalista hold			

=== For Mayor ===
Mayor Lani Cayetano won unopposed.

Taguig Mayoralty Election
Party	Candidate	Votes	%
Nacionalista	Ma. Laarni "Lani" Cayetano	224,981	100.00
Total votes		224,981	100.00
Nacionalista hold			

=== Vice Mayor ===
Vice Mayor Ricardo Cruz Jr. won unopposed.

Taguig Vice Mayoralty Election
Party	Candidate	Votes	%
Nacionalista	Ricardo "Ading" Cruz Jr.	201,708	100.00
Total votes		201,708	100.00
Nacionalista hold			

=== For Councilors ===
==== First District ====
City Council Elections in Taguig's First District
Party	Candidate	Votes	%
Nacionalista	Allan Paul Cruz	78,875	
Nacionalista	Darwin "Win" Icay	78,666	
Nacionalista	Rodil "Tikboy" Marcelino	76,129	
Nacionalista	Rommel "Ome" Tanyag	75,491	
Nacionalista	Baby Gloria "Gigi" De Mesa	75,296	
Nacionalista	Carlito "Oga" Ogalinola	71,653	
Nacionalista	Ferdinand "Ferdie" Santos	70,800	
Nacionalista	Ryanne Gutierrez	69,859	
Independent	Domingo Acorda	27,128	
Total votes		623,897	100.00

Party	Votes	%	Seats
Nacionalista Party	596,769	95.65	8
Independent	27,128	4.35	0
Total	623,897	100.00	8

==== Second District ====
City Council Elections in Taguig's Second District
Party	Candidate	Votes	%
Nacionalista	Arvin Ian Alit	99,382	
Nacionalista	Maria Amparo "Pammy" Zamora	89,344	
Nacionalista	Edwin "Jojo" Eron	88,853	
Nacionalista	Noel "DBoy" Dizon	83,085	
Nacionalista	Richard Paul Jordan	82,894	
Nacionalista	Maria Mher Supan	79,614	
Nacionalista	Yasser Pangandaman	67,187	
Nacionalista	Jaime Garcia	61,520	
Independent	Janine "Jaja" Bustos	52,691	
Independent	Rosario Mendoza	32,640	
Independent	Basilio Pooten	29,742	
Independent	Deogracias Santiago	23,086	
Independent	Benjamin Sayson Jr.	18,065	
Independent	Arthur Calvo	15,707	
Independent	Lorenzo Lorono	14,349	
Total votes		838,159	100.00

Party	Votes	%	Seats
Nacionalista Party	651,879	77.78	8
Independent	186,280	22.22	0
Total	838,159	100.00	8
