= Mayor of Taguig =

Local chief executive of Taguig, Philippines

- Punong Lungsod ng Taguig
- Seal of the City of Taguig

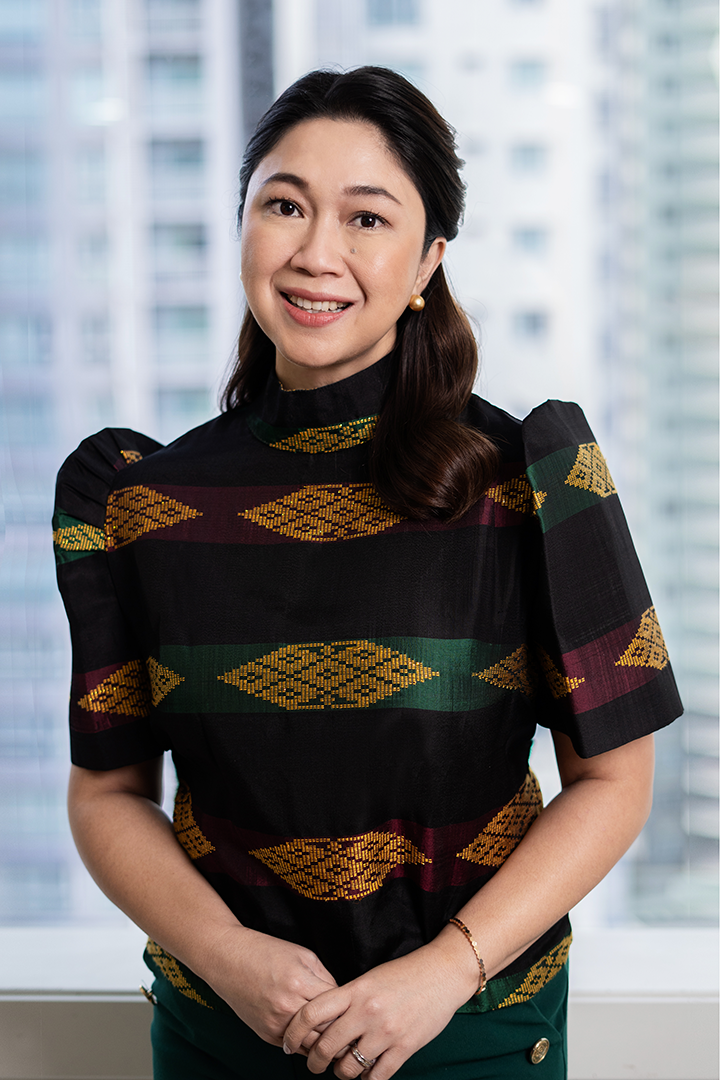
- Incumbent; Lani Cayetano since June 30, 2022
- Style: The Honorable, Mayor
- Seat: Taguig City Hall, Tuktukan
- Appointer: Elected via popular vote
- Term length: 3 years, not eligible for re-election immediately after three consecutive terms
- Inaugural holder: Feliciano Pagkalinawan
- Formation: 1901
- Website: taguig.gov.ph/our-leaders/

The City Mayor of Taguig (Filipino: Punong Lungsod ng Tagig) is the head of the executive branch of the Taguig city government. The mayor holds office at the Taguig City Hall. Like all local government heads in the Philippines, the mayor is elected via popular vote, and may not be elected for a fourth consecutive term (although the former mayor may return to office after an interval of one term). In case of death, resignation or incapacity, the vice mayor becomes the mayor. The city mayor is restricted to three consecutive terms, totaling nine years, and cannot be elected for a fourth consecutive term. However, a mayor can be elected again after an interval of one term. Lani Cayetano of Nacionalista Party is the incumbent since 2022.

== History ==
From the start, Taguig has its own chieftain, Lakan named Juan Basi who fought his life against the Spaniard along with Agustin de Legaspi, a nephew of Lakan Dula and son-in-law of the Sultan of Brunei during the Magat Salamat uprising in 1587–1588. But since the year 1584, a non-resident vicar from the Augustinian order named P. Melchor de Ribera was assigned to convert to Christianity the natives of the town.

In 1587, according to P. Gaspar San Agustin, Taguig was once again accepted in the list of "Augustinian Chapter" in a meeting held on April 4, 1587 through "Tomamos de nuevo la casa de Tagui, con voto".

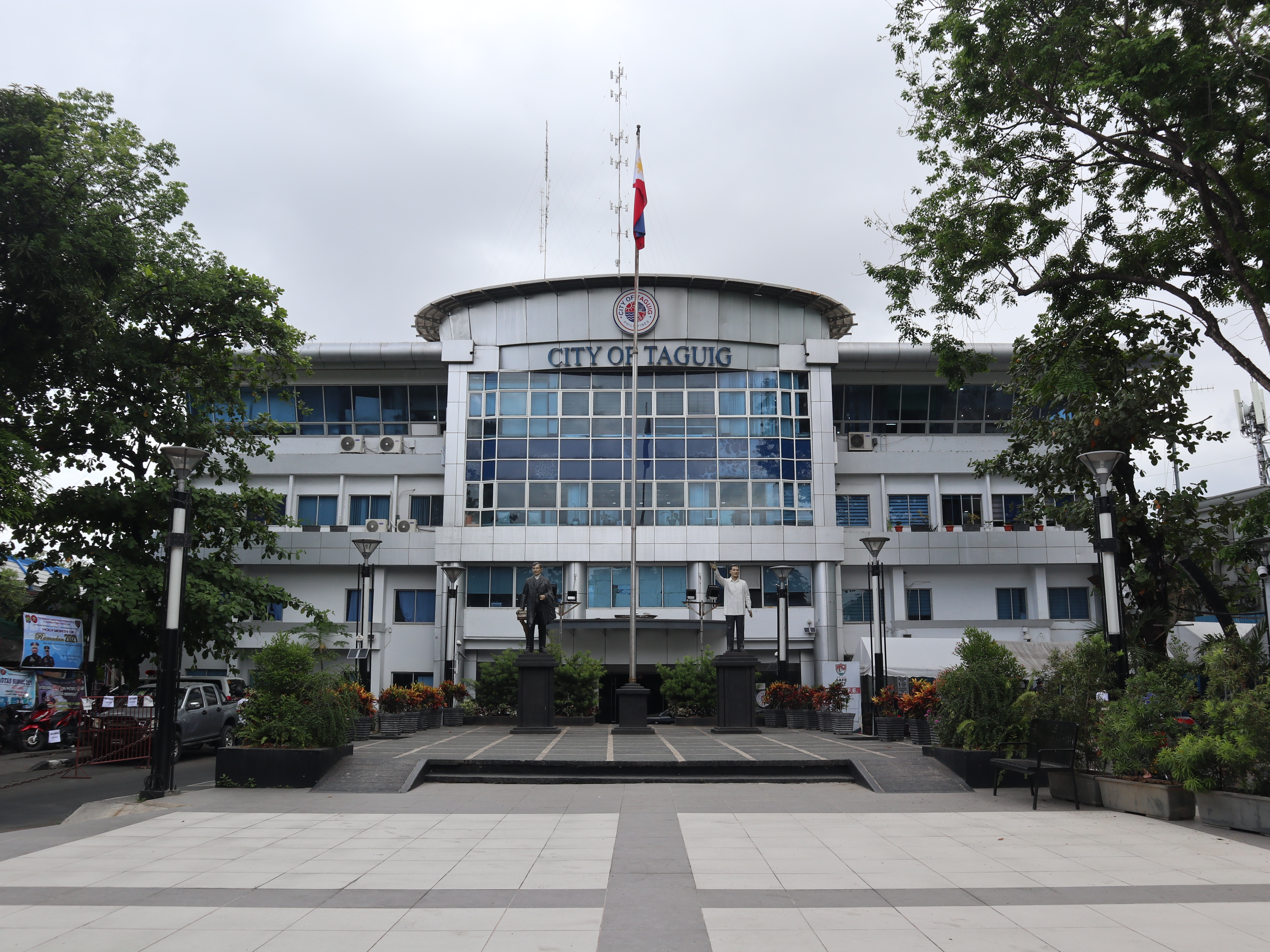
The mayor of Taguig holds office at the Taguig City Hall.

From 1856 to 1897, Taguig, then a municipality of the province of Manila (previously Tondo until 1859), was headed by the capitan municipal as its chief executive. Following the Philippine Declaration of Independence, the position was replaced by the Pangulo ng Bayan (transl. Municipal President), which was solely held by Baltazar Capistrano from 1898 to 1899. In 1901, the year when Taguig became part of the newly established province of Rizal, the chief executive was named mayor, which was first held by Feliciano Pagkalinawan. Despite merging with Pateros from 1903 to 1909, both municipalities had different leaders, respectively.

== List ==
Name	Deputy (later Vice Mayor)	Term Began	Term Ended
Capitan Municipal de Taguig
Domingo Franco		1856	1857
Vicente Azores		1857	1858
Juan B. Labao		1859	1860
Domingo Guevarra		1860	1861
Venancio Sandoval		1861	1862
Leandro Labao		1862	1863
Salvador Esguerra		1863	1864
Tomas Cruz		1865	1866
Ciriaco Labao		1867	1868
Domingo Guerrero		1869	1870
Agustin Rayos		1871	1872
Leoncio Pagkalinawan		1873	1874
Clemente Labao		1875	1876
Clemente Labao		1877	1878
Jose Natividad		1879	1880
Feliciano Pagkalinawan		1881	1882
Miguel Aquino		1887	1888
Miguel Aquino		1889	1890
Jose Natividad		1891	1892
Marcos Lontoc		1893	1894
Jose Natividad		1895	1897
Pangulo ng Bayan
Baltazar Capistrano		June 12, 1898	March 16, 1899
Municipal Mayor of Taguig
Feliciano Pagkalinawan	Pantaleon Franco	1901	1903
Felipe Rayos del Sol	Francisco de Borja (1904-1908); Lorenzo Rosales (1908-1909); Braulio Pagkalinawan (1910-1911)	1904	1910
Braulio Pagkalinawan	Marcelino Elias	1911	1912
Graciano Juta	Juan Cuevas	1912	1916
Jose Pagtakhan	Antero Ignacio (1916-1922); Fortunato Dinguinbayan (1922-1925)	1916	1925
Eusebio Santos	Ciriaco Tiñga (1925-1928); Tomas San Pedro (1928-1931)	1925	1931
Cleto Mastrili	Exequiel Labao	1931	1934
Artemio Natividad	Teotimo Cuevas (October 16, 1934 - October 15, 1937); Ciriaco Tiñga (January 1, 1938 -December 31,1940); Leocadio De Leon (January 1, 1941 - December 3, 1942)	October 16, 1934	December 3, 1942
Leocadio De Leon		December 4, 1942	February 17, 1945
Pedro D. Cruz	Ireneo A. Cruz	July 1, 1945	December 31, 1945
Leocadio De Leon	Ciriaco Tiñga	January 9, 1946	May 31, 1946
Pedro D. Cruz	Isidro Fermin	June 1, 1946	December 31, 1947
Nicanor P. Cruz	Tiburcio Santos	January 1, 1948	December 30, 1951

No.	Image	Name of mayor	Party	Term	Start of term	End of term	Name of Vice mayor
Elective position (1952–present)
1		Bonifacio Relon		1952	January 1, 1952	December 31, 1955	Isidro Fermin
2		Monico C. Tanyag		1956	January 1, 1956	December 31, 1975	Alfonso C. Roldan
2		Monico C. Tanyag		1960	January 1, 1956	December 31, 1975	Augusto M. Garcia
2		Monico C. Tanyag		1964	January 1, 1956	December 31, 1975	Jose C. Bernie
2		Monico C. Tanyag		1968	January 1, 1956	December 31, 1975	Alvaro P. Villar
2		Monico C. Tanyag		1972	January 1, 1956	December 31, 1975	Nicanor C. Garcia
3		Levi B. Mariano		1976	April 14, 1976	March 25, 1986	
4		Isidro B. Garcia		1986	March 26, 1986	November 30, 1987	
5		Donato L. Estacio, Jr. (OIC)		1987	December 1, 1987	October 9, 1988	Federico Caday
6		Rodolfo De Guzman		1988	October 10, 1988	June 30, 1992	Pacifico Santos
7		Ricardo D. Papa Jr.	PDP–Laban	1992	July 6, 1992	June 30, 1995	Daniel Castillo
(4)		Isidro B. Garcia		1995	June 30, 1995	August 27, 1997	vacant
(4)		Isidro B. Garcia		1995	June 30, 1995	August 27, 1997	Loida O. Labao-Alzona
(7)		Ricardo D. Papa Jr.	Lakas–NUCD	1995	September 2, 1997	June 30, 1998	Loida O. Labao-Alzona
(7)		Ricardo D. Papa Jr.	Lakas–NUCD	1995	September 2, 1997	June 30, 1998	vacant
(7)		Ricardo D. Papa Jr.	Lakas–NUCD	1995	September 2, 1997	June 30, 1998	Alan Peter Cayetano
(7)		Ricardo D. Papa Jr.	Lakas–NUCD	1998	June 30, 1998	June 30, 2001	Loida O. Labao-Alzona
8		Sigfrido Tiñga	Kilusang Diwa ng Taguig (Note: Sigfrido Tiñga was also a member of the national parties Lakas–CMD and later Liberal Party.)	2001	June 30, 2001	June 30, 2010	Loida O. Labao-Alzona
8		Sigfrido Tiñga	Kilusang Diwa ng Taguig	2004	June 30, 2001	June 30, 2010	George Elias
8		Sigfrido Tiñga	Kilusang Diwa ng Taguig	2007	June 30, 2001	June 30, 2010	George Elias
9		Lani Cayetano	Nacionalista	2010	June 30, 2010	June 30, 2019	George Elias
9		Lani Cayetano	Nacionalista	2013	June 30, 2010	June 30, 2019	Ricardo Cruz Jr.
9		Lani Cayetano	Nacionalista	2016	June 30, 2010	June 30, 2019	Ricardo Cruz Jr.
10		Lino Cayetano	Nacionalista	2019	June 30, 2019	June 30, 2022	Ricardo Cruz Jr.
(9)		Lani Cayetano	Nacionalista	2022	June 30, 2022	June 30, 2028	Arvin Ian V. Alit
(9)		Lani Cayetano	Nacionalista	2025	June 30, 2022	June 30, 2028	Arvin Ian V. Alit

== List of acting and appointed OIC mayors of Taguig ==
Name	Term Began	Term Ended	Status
Acting and Appointed OIC Mayor of Taguig
Aquilino Sarmiento	February 17, 1945	June 30, 1945	Acting mayor during the liberation of Taguig
Donato L. Estacio, Jr.	December 1, 1987	October 9, 1988	Appointed OIC Mayor after People Power Revolution
