= 2010 Pateros local elections =

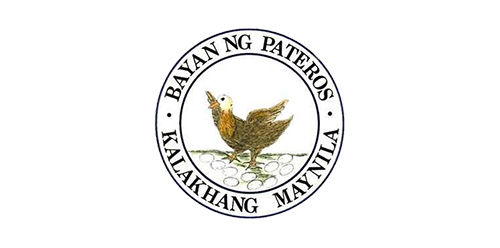
- May 10, 2010
| Nominee | Jaime "Joey" Medina | Patrick Capco Umali |
| Party | Nacionalista | Independent |
| Running mate | Jose Jonathan "Jojo" Sanchez |
| Popular vote | 18,322 | 6,161 |
| Percentage | 74.84% | 25.16% |
| Party | PMP |
| Running mate | Jorge "Jojo" Nicdao |
Mayor before election
Jaime "Joey" Medina
PDP–Laban
Elected mayor
Jaime "Joey" Medina
Nacionalista

Local elections in Pateros were held on May 10, 2010 within the general election. The voters elected for the elective local posts in the municipality: the mayor, vice mayor, district representative, and councilors, six in each of the municipality's two districts.

== Background ==
Mayor Jaime "Joey" Medina ran for re-election. His opponent was Patrick Capco Umali, the nephew of former mayor Rosendo Capco.

Vice Mayor Jose Jonathan "Jojo" Sanchez ran for re-election as well. His opponent was Jorge "Jojo" Nicdao, a former councilor from the 1st district.

Taguig-Pateros Rep. Lani Cayetano did not seek a second term, and chose to ran for mayor of Taguig. Her party chose former Muntinlupa councilor Rene Carl "Ren-Ren" Cayetano, her brother-in-law. He was challenged by Arnel Cerafica, a former councilor from Taguig's 2nd district, and independents Luis Cruz Jr., and Joselito Johannes Gabriel.

== Results ==
=== For Mayor ===
Mayor Jaime "Joey" Medina defeated his opponent, Patrick Capco Umali by a margin of 12,161 votes.

Pateros Mayoralty Elections
| Party | Candidate | Votes | % |
|---|---|---|---|
| Nacionalista | Jaime "Joey" Medina | 18,322 | 74.84 |
| Independent | Patrick Capco Umali | 6,161 | 25.16 |
| Valid ballots | | 24,483 | 94.88 |
| Invalid or blank votes | | 1,321 | 5.12 |
| Total votes | | 25,804 | 100.00 |

=== For Vice Mayor ===
Vice Mayor Jose Jonathan "Jojo" Sanchez defeated his opponent, Jorge "Jojo" Nicdao by a margin of 3,696 votes.

Pateros Vice Mayoralty Elections
| Party | Candidate | Votes | % |
|---|---|---|---|
| Independent | Jose Jonathan "Jojo" Sanchez | 13,671 | 57.82 |
| PMP | Jorge "Jojo" Nicdao | 9,975 | 42.18 |
| Valid ballots | | 23,646 | 91.64 |
| Invalid or blank votes | | 2,158 | 8.36 |
| Total votes | | 25,804 | 100.00 |

=== For Representative, Taguig-Pateros Lone District ===
Arnel Cerafica defeats Rene Carl "Ren-Ren" Cayetano by a margin of 3,498 votes or 14.08%.

Pateros Vice Mayoralty Elections
| Party | Candidate | Votes | % |
|---|---|---|---|
| Liberal | Arnel Cerafica | 14,132 | 56.87 |
| Nacionalista | Rene Carl "Ren-Ren" Cayetano | 10,634 | 42.79 |
| Independent | Joselito Johannes Gabriel | 48 | 0.19 |
| Independent | Luis Cruz Jr. | 37 | 0.15 |
| Valid ballots | | 24,851 | 96.31 |
| Invalid or blank votes | | 953 | 3.69 |
| Total votes | | 25,804 | 100.00 |

=== For Councilors ===
Incumbent councilors are in italics.

| Party or alliance | | Votes | % | Seats |
|---|---|---|---|---|
| Samahang Mas na Mas | Nacionalista Party | 38,381 | 30.05 | 5 |
| Samahang Mas na Mas | Independent | 23,786 | 18.62 | 2 |
| Samahang Mas na Mas | Total | 62,167 | 48.67 | 7 |
| Pwersa ng Masang Pilipino | | 39,082 | 30.60 | 3 |
| Liberal Party | | 14,131 | 11.06 | 1 |
| Independent | | 12,346 | 9.67 | 1 |
| Ex-officio seats | | | | 2 |
| Total | | 127,726 | 100.00 | 14 |

==== First District ====
2010 Pateros Municipal Council elections in the 1st district
| Party | Candidate | Votes | % |
|---|---|---|---|
| PMP | Gerald German | 7,828 | |
| PMP | Lauro Capco | 7,571 | |
| Nacionalista | Milaor "Mil" Villegas | 7,098 | |
| Liberal | Allan Dela Cruz | 7,003 | |
| Nacionalista | Rosario Muñoz | 5,866 | |
| Nacionalista | Dominador "Ador" Rosales Jr. | 5,861 | |
| Independent | Pio Joel Reyes | 5,570 | |
| Nacionalista | Jaime Flores | 5,459 | |
| PMP | Oscar Ongmanchi | 5,211 | |
| Nacionalista | Rolando "Lando" Dolon | 4,263 | |
| PMP | Antonio Saez | 3,804 | |
| Liberal | Ruel Gatpayat | 3,661 | |
| Independent | Joseph "Manay" Manzon | 1,810 | |
| Total votes | | 71,055 | |

==== Second District ====
2010 Pateros Municipal Council elections in the 2nd district
| Party | Candidate | Votes | % |
|---|---|---|---|
| Independent | Ernesto Cortez | 5,689 | |
| PMP | Alberto Tañga | 5,602 | |
| Nacionalista | Jeric Reyes | 4,999 | |
| Independent | Maria Kathleen "Ayie" Ampe | 4,967 | |
| Nacionalista | Daisy Reyes | 4,835 | |
| Independent | Edgar Noel Castillo | 4,442 | |
| PMP | Allan Dennis "Alden" Mangoba | 4,244 | |
| Independent | Gerardo Sanchez | 4,043 | |
| Independent | Joseph Elmer Reyes | 4,042 | |
| Independent | Joseph Dayco | 3,743 | |
| PMP | Jowell Raymundo | 3,334 | |
| Liberal | Julio Ungco Jr. | 1,970 | |
| Liberal | Ernesto Gallano | 1,497 | |
| PMP | Arturo Enriquez | 1,438 | |
| Independent | Crisanto Arteza Jr. | 818 | |
| Independent | Ricardo Santos | 493 | |
| Independent | Angelito Yari | 316 | |
| Independent | Arturo Arancel | 199 | |
| Total votes | | 56,671 | |
