= 2010 Taguig local elections =

2010 Taguig mayoral elections
- May 10, 2010
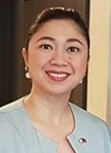

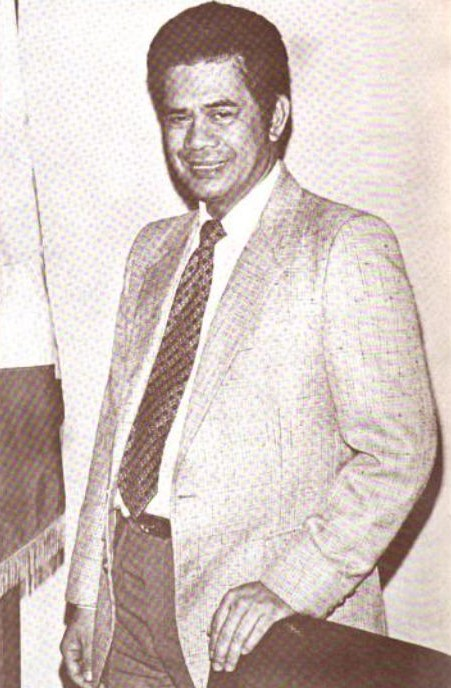
Nominee	Lani Cayetano	Dante Tiñga
Party	Nacionalista	Liberal
Running mate	Ferdinand "Ferdie" Santos	George Elias
Popular vote	95,865	93,445
Percentage	50.53	49.25
Mayor before election
Sigfrido Tiñga
Lakas
Elected mayor
Lani Cayetano
Nacionalista

Local elections were held in Taguig on May 10, 2010, within the Philippine general election. The voters will elect for the elective local posts in the city: the mayor, vice mayor, two District representatives, and councilors, eight in each of the city's two legislative districts.

== Background ==
Mayor Sigfrido "Freddie" Tiñga was term-limited. He ran as representative of second district. His party chosen his father, retired Associate Justice and former Rep. Dante Tiñga, to run in his place. Tiñga ran under Liberal Party and its Taguig affiliate, the local party Kilusang Diwa ng Taguig. Tiñga faced 1st district Rep. Lani Cayetano of Nacionalista, Arthur Clavo, and John Rarang.

Vice Mayor George Elias was on second term, and ran for third term. He was challenged by Ferdinand "Ferdie" Santos (Cayetano's running mate), Jeffrey Lontoc, and Cirila Lumontod.

1st District Rep. Lani Cayetano was on her first term. Although eligible to run for a second term, she decided to run for mayor under Nacionalista instead. Her party chosen her brother-in-law, former Muntinlupa Councilor Rene Carl "Ren-Ren" Cayetano, to run in her place. She was challenged by former Taguig Second District Councilor and defeated 2007 congressional candidate Arnel Cerafica, and independent candidates Luis Cruz Jr. and Joselito Gabriel.

2nd District Rep. Henry Dueñas Jr. won the 2007 elections. But following the HRET ruling in February 2010, he was unseated and replaced by his opponent, Angelito "Jett" Reyes. Upon ruling, Reyes was the duly elected representative of the district. Reyes defeated Dueñas by a margin of 37 votes; the Board of Canvassers originally declared Duenas the winner with 28,564 votes over Reyes' 27,107 for a margin of 1,457. Reyes ran for re-election for his supposedly first term. He was challenged by Mayor Sigfrido "Freddie" Tiñga, Second District Councilor Arvin Ian Alit, and independent candidates James Layug, and Robinson "Robin" Lumontod Jr.

== Results ==
=== For Mayor ===
Rep. Lani Cayetano defeated retired Associate Justice and former Rep. Dante Tiñga. Tiñga later filed an election protest and accused Cayetano of massive vote-buying and pre-programmed CF cards altered results in Taguig, but the protest was later dismissed.

Taguig Mayoralty Election
Party	Candidate	Votes	%
Nacionalista	Lani Cayetano	95,865	50.53
Liberal	Dante Tiñga	93,445	49.25
Independent	Arthur Clavo	214	0.11
Independent	John Q. Rarang	205	0.11
Total votes		185,759	100.00
Nacionalista hold			

=== For Vice Mayor ===
Vice Mayor George Elias defeated Ferdinand "Ferdie" Santos.

Taguig Vice Mayoral Election
Party	Candidate	Votes	%
Liberal	George Elias	110,137	62.91
Nacionalista	Ferdinand "Ferdie" Santos	51,564	29.45
PMP	Jeffrey Lontoc	12,366	7.06
Independent	Cirila A. Lumontod	996	0.57
Total votes		171,360	100.00
Liberal hold			

=== For Representatives ===
==== First District ====
Former Councilor and defeated 2007 congressional candidate Arnel Cerafica won over his predecessor's brother-in-law, former Muntinlupa Councilor Rene Carl "Ren-Ren" Cayetano.

Congressional Elections for Taguig's First District
Party	Candidate	Votes	%
Liberal	Arnel Cerafica	51,132	61.18
Nacionalista	Rene Carl "Ren-Ren" Cayetano	31,924	38.20
Independent	Luis Cruz Jr.	312	0.37
Independent	Joselito Gabriel	208	0.25
Total votes		83,576	100.00
Liberal hold			

==== Second District ====
Rep. Angelito "Jett" Reyes was defeated by Mayor Sigfrido "Freddie" Tiñga. Reyes failed to secure his first full term after serving unexpired term of unseated Rep. Henry "Jun" Dueñas Jr.

Congressional Elections for Taguig's Second District
Party	Candidate	Votes	%
Liberal	Sigfrido "Freddie" Tiñga	61,483	60.62
Lingkod Taguig	Angelito "Jett" Reyes	16,990	16.75
Nacionalista	Arvin Ian Alit	16,184	15.96
Independent	James Layug	6,637	6.54
Independent	Robinson "Robin" Lumontod Jr.	135	0.13
Valid ballots		101,429	94.91
Invalid or blank votes		5,438	5.09
Total votes		106,867	100.00
Liberal hold			

=== For Councilors ===
Party	Votes	%	Seats
Liberal Party/Kilusang Diwa ng Taguig	597,937	46.45	13
Nacionalista Party	372,651	28.95	0
Nationalist People's Coalition/Kilusang Diwa ng Taguig	133,480	10.37	3
Lingkod Taguig	55,749	4.33	0
Pwersa ng Masang Pilipino	30,410	2.36	0
People's Reform Party	20,494	1.59	0
Bangon Pilipinas	14,229	1.11	0
Independent	62,266	4.84	0
Ex officio seats			2
Total	1,287,216	100.00	18
Total votes	195,502	–	

==== First District ====
City Council Elections in Taguig's First District
Party	Candidate	Votes	%
NPC	Ronnette “Ronet” Franco	44,325	7.56
Liberal	Gamaliel “Gamie” San Pedro	43,381	7.39
Liberal	Roderick Carlos “Carlo” Papa	43,342	7.39
NPC	Baltazar “Bal” Mariategue	41,931	7.15
Liberal	Jaime “Jimmy” Labampa	41,645	7.10
Liberal	Baby Gloria “Gigi” De Mesa	40,414	6.89
Liberal	Rodil Carlos "Tikboy” Marcelino	39,164	6.68
Liberal	Carlito “Carlito Oga” Ogalinola	36,836	6.28
Nacionalista	Ricardo “Ading” Cruz Jr.	35,362	6.03
Nacionalista	Emmanuel “Boybits” Victoria Jr.	33,573	5.72
Nacionalista	Darwin “Win” Icay	33,277	5.67
Nacionalista	Eduardo “Eddie” Cruz	30,717	5.24
Nacionalista	Aurelio “Auring” Padilla	27,918	4.76
Nacionalista	Jinky Sarmiento	26,446	4.51
Nacionalista	Henry “Vegatin” Vega	25,138	4.29
Nacionalista	Generoso “Gener” Ignacio	20,754	3.54
Independent	Robel “Roy” Delapaz	9,576	1.63
PMP	Alberto “Abet” Villanueva	5,455	0.93
PMP	Gerry “Magdalo” Placeros	4,922	0.84
Independent	Joepeter “Jhe” Hidalgo	2,464	0.42
Total votes		106,867	100.00

==== Second District ====
City Council Elections in Taguig's Second District
Party	Candidate	Votes	%
Liberal	Aurelio Paulo "AP" Bartolome	57,552	
Liberal	Milagros "Myla" Valencia	54,459	
Liberal	Estela "Estel" Gasgonia	52,989	
Liberal	Ricardo "Ric" Jordan	52,041	
Liberal	Michelle Anne "Cheche" Gonzales	50,816	
NPC	Erwin "Win" Manalili	47,224	
Liberal	Jeffrey "Jeff" Morales	46,139	
Liberal	Edwin "Jojo" Eron	39,159	
Nacionalista	Noel "DBoy" Dizon	27,691	
Nacionalista	Janine "Jaja" Bustos	26,928	
Nacionalista	Hareem "Harry" Pautin	23,919	
Nacionalista	Queen Dolly Carreon	23,617	
Lingkod Taguig	Marc Reyes	22,944	
PRP	Margarette Jean "Maggie" Manalaysay	20,494	
Nacionalista	Wilfredo "Toto" Dubria	18,299	
PMP	Leo Aguilar	15,273	
Lingkod Taguig	Lhorelyn "Lenlen" Fortuno	15,256	
Independent	Eric Walter Salonga	14,787	
Bangon Pilipinas	Vilma Antigo	14,229	
Independent	Eugenio Sonny "Eugene" Calapit	13,765	
Nacionalista	Guido Malco	13,468	
Lingkod Taguig	Maricar "Mara" Villa	11,667	
Independent	Princess Jacel Ramos	10,146	
Independent	Celerino "Celly" Morada	5,882	
Nacionalista	Ruth Fronda	5,544	
PMP	Ahiyal Sappayani	4,760	
Independent	Hernando Mendoza	4,609	
Independent	Taharudin Mokalid	3,510	
Independent	Reynaldo Acas	3,409	
Total votes			100.00
