= Henry Dueñas Jr. =

Filipino politician

Henry M. Dueñas Jr.

Member of the Philippine House of Representatives from Taguig-Pateros's 2nd congressional district
- In office June 30, 2007 – February 28, 2010^{1}
- Preceded by: Post created
- Succeeded by: Angelito Reyes

Member of the Taguig City Council from the 2nd district Member of the Taguig Municipal Council (2001–2004)
- In office June 30, 2001 – June 30, 2007

Personal details
- Born: Henry Montes Dueñas Jr. November 19, 1965 (age 60)
- Party: PDP–Laban (2018-present); Kilusang Diwa ng Taguig (2007-present)
- Other political affiliations: NPC (2012-2018); Liberal (2011-2012); Lakas-CMD (until 2011)
- ^{1} Replaced by Angelito Reyes as per House Electoral Tribunal decision on February 28, 2010.

Henry "Jun" Montes Dueñas Jr. (born November 19, 1965) is a Filipino politician who was a member of the Philippine House of Representatives representing 2nd district of Taguig from 2007 to his replacement by Angelito Reyes in 2010. He was also a Vice Chairman of Public Order and Safety.

== Political career ==
=== Councilor of Taguig ===
Prior to his election to the Congress, Dueñas served as a councilor for the second district of Taguig from 2001 to 2007.

=== House of Representatives ===
When the lone district of Taguig was divided into two separate districts, he ran for the second congressional District of Taguig and was allied with Taguig Mayor Sigfrido Tiñga. On the 2007 midterm elections, Dueñas won the Congress seat as the first representative of the 2nd congressional district. After the canvass of the votes, Duenas was proclaimed the winner, having garnered 28,564 votes as opposed to the 27,107 votes garnered by his closest rival, Angelito "Jett" P. Reyes, the son of then-Energy Secretary Angelo Reyes. Not conceding defeat, Reyes filed an election protest, praying for a revision/recount, alleging that he was cheated in the protested 170 of 732 precincts through insidious and well-orchestrated electoral frauds and anomalies which resulted in the systematic reduction of his votes and the corresponding increase in petitioner's votes. Dueñas has been replaced by Reyes on February 28, 2010.

As a member of the House of Representatives, Dueñas proposed and authored the following bills:

- House Bill No. 2425, creating three branches of Metropolitan Trial Court of Metro Manila for Taguig.
- House Bill No. 4994, creating seven branches of Regional Trial Court for Taguig.
- House Bill No. 5854, creating three additional branches of Metropolitan Trial Court of the NCR to be stationed at Taguig.
- House Bill No. 6406, excluding certain parcels of land of the public domain in Western Bicutan.
- House Bill No. 6445, creating seven branches of the Regional Trial Court for Taguig.

Dueñas (Lakas Kampi CMD) and Reyes (Lingkod Taguig) were slated to face rivalry again in the 2010 election, but the former withdrew from the race to support outgoing Mayor Tiñga's candidacy for the same position.

== Comeback attempts ==
Dueñas attempted a comeback to the Congress by running for the second district of Taguig in the 2013 local elections but eventually lost to Lino Cayetano.

Dueñas then ran for vice mayor of Taguig in the 2019 local elections as the running mate of outgoing Taguig–Pateros 1st district Congressman Arnel Cerafica, who was running for mayor under PDP–Laban. However, they both lost.
