= Dante Tiñga =

Filipino jurist (born 1939)

The Honorable Dante O. Tiñga
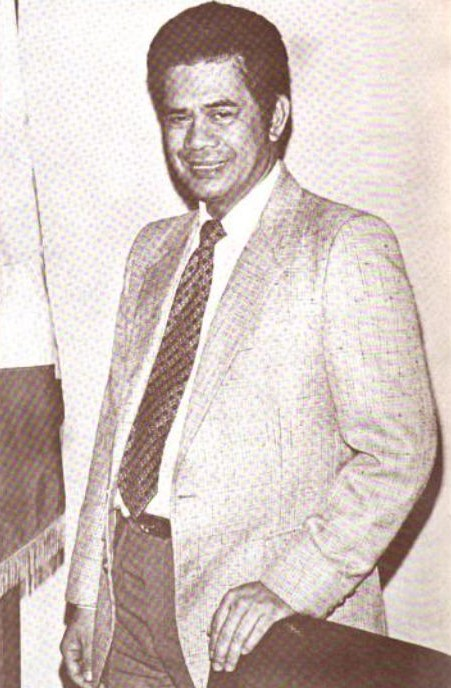
- Tiñga official portrait during the 8th Congress.

Chairman of the Development Bank of the Philippines
- Acting
- In office December 22, 2022 – March 2024
- Appointed by: Bongbong Marcos
- President: Emmanuel G. Herbosa
- Preceded by: Alberto Romulo
- Succeeded by: Philip G. Lo

154th Associate Justice of the Supreme Court of the Philippines
- In office July 4, 2003 – May 10, 2009
- Appointed by: Gloria Macapagal Arroyo
- Preceded by: Vicente V. Mendoza
- Succeeded by: Roberto A. Abad

Member of the Philippine House of Representatives from Taguig–Pateros's at-large congressional district
- In office June 30, 1987 – June 30, 1998
- Preceded by: District created
- Succeeded by: Alan Peter Cayetano

Dean of the Polytechnic University of the Philippines College of Law
- In office 2001–2003

Dean of the University of the East College of Law
- In office 2017–2018 (Interim)
- Preceded by: Williard Riano
- Succeeded by: Viviana Paguirigan
- In office April 1, 1989 – May 1, 1993
- Preceded by: Celedonio Tiongson
- Succeeded by: Artemio Tuquero

Personal details
- Born: May 11, 1939 (age 87) Taguig, Rizal, Commonwealth of the Philippines
- Party: Silbi (2021–present); Kilusang Diwa ng Taguig (2009–present)
- Other political affiliations: Liberal (2009–2021); PDP–Laban (1984–2009)
- Spouse: Ma. Asuncion Rodriguez (died 1996)
- Education: University of the East (LLB); University of California, Berkeley (LLM)

Dante Osorio Tiñga (born May 11, 1939) is a Filipino politician and jurist who has served as the acting chairman of the Development Bank of the Philippines from 2022 to 2024. He served as an associate justice of the Supreme Court of the Philippines from 2003 to 2009.

== Profile ==
In 1960, Tiñga obtained his law degree at the University of the East College of Law, where he also served as dean of the college from 1989 to 1993 and again from 2017 to 2018. Tiñga earned his Master of Laws degree from the University of California at Berkeley in 1970. From 1987 to 1998, Tiñga served as a three-term congressman representing the Taguig-Pateros district. From 2001 until his appointment to the Supreme Court, he was the first dean of the College of Law of the Polytechnic University of the Philippines. Justice Tiñga also maintained an extensive private practice prior to his elevation to the Court.

He is the father of Sigfrido Tiñga, who served as a Taguig city mayor and representative, and Rica Tiñga, a former Taguig councilor and 2013 mayoralty candidate.

Tiñga ran for mayor of Taguig in 1998 and 2010, but lost to Ricardo Papa and Lani Cayetano, respectively. Lost in a slim margin, he filed an electoral protest over the results of the 2010 election but it was later dismissed.

Tiñga sought a congressional comeback in the 2022 elections, this time as the first nominee of the newly created Silbi Partylist. However, the partylist failed to secure at least one seat.

On December 9, 2022, Tiñga was appointed as the acting chairman and member of the board of directors of the Development Bank of the Philippines.

On April 25, 2024, the University of the East led by President Zosimo M. Battad, Louie Divinagracia and College of Law Dean Viviana Paguirigan, bestowed Juris Doctor upon Tiñga and Japar Dimaampao at Rizal Park Hotel Grand Ballroom. On October 29, 2024, Tiñga filed petitions for certiorari and a temporary restraining order with the Supreme Court, challenging the constitutionality of Taguig City Ordinance No. 144, which added four councilors per district as a response to the disenfranchisement of newly added Embo barangays from Makati. He also sought to nullify COMELEC Resolution No. 11069 and Senate-House Concurrent Resolution No. 26 on the inclusion of Embo barangays in Taguig.

Academic offices
Preceded by Celedonio Tiongson	Dean of the University of the East College of Law; 1989–1993	Succeeded by Artemio Tuquero
Preceded by Willard Riano	Dean of the University of the East College of Law (interim); 2017–2018	Succeeded by Viviana Paguirigan
House of Representatives of the Philippines
New district	Representative of Taguig-Pateros; 1987–1998	Succeeded by Alan Peter Cayetano
Legal offices
Preceded by Vicente V. Mendoza	Associate Justice of the Supreme Court of the Philippines; 2003–2009	Succeeded by Roberto A. Abad
Other offices
Preceded by Alberto Romulo	Chairman of the Development Bank of the Philippines; 2022–2024	Succeeded by Philip Lo
