= 2013 Taguig local elections =

2013 Taguig mayoral election
- May 13, 2013
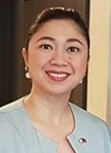
Nominee	Lani Cayetano	Rica Tiñga
Party	Nacionalista	Kilusang Diwa ng Taguig
Running mate	Ricardo "Ading" Cruz Jr.	Roderick Carlos Papa
Popular vote	60,922	37,090
Percentage	60.86%	37.05%
Mayor before election
Lani Cayetano
Nacionalista
Elected mayor
Lani Cayetano
Nacionalista

Local elections were held in Taguig on May 13, 2013, within the Philippine general election. The vote was for the elective local posts in the city: the mayor, vice mayor, two District representatives, and councilors, eight in each of the city's two legislative districts.

== Background ==
Mayor Lani Cayetano was on her first term, and she ran for re-election for second term. She faced former Councilor Rica Tiñga, who is the daughter of Cayetano's closest rival in 2010, Dante Tiñga.

Vice Mayor George Elias was term-limited. His party chosen First District Councilor Roderick Carlos “Carlo” Papa, son of former Mayor Ricardo Papa Jr. Papa faced Lower Bicutan Barangay Captain Ricardo "Ading" Cruz Jr., Cayetano's running mate.

First District Rep. Arnel Cerafica was on his first term, and he ran for re-election for second term. He faced First District Councilor Gigi De Mesa.

Second District Rep. Sigfrido "Freddie" Tiñga was on his first term. Although eligible for re-election, he opted to retire from politics. His party fielded former Rep. Henry Dueñas Jr.. Dueñas faced television director and Fort Bonifacio Barangay Captain Lino Cayetano.

== Results ==
=== For Mayor ===
Mayor Lani Cayetano defeated former Councilor Rica Tiñga.

Taguig Mayoralty Elections
Party	Candidate	Votes	%
Nacionalista	Lani Cayetano	60,922	60.86
Kilusang Diwa ng Taguig	Rica Tiñga	37,090	37.05
Margin of victory		23,832	23.81%
Invalid or blank votes		2,084	2.08
Total votes		100,096	100.00
Nacionalista hold			

=== For Vice Mayor ===
Lower Bicutan Barangay Captain Ricardo "Ading" Cruz Jr. won over First District Councilor Roderick Carlos “Carlo” Papa.

Taguig Vice Mayoralty Elections
Party	Candidate	Votes	%
Nacionalista	Ricardo "Ading" Cruz Jr.	51,854	51.80
Kilusang Diwa ng Taguig	Roderick Carlos Papa	40,855	40.82
Margin of victory		10,999	10.99%
Invalid or blank votes		7,387	7.38
Total votes		100,096	100.00
Nacionalista hold			

=== For Representatives ===
==== First District ====
Rep. Arnel Cerafica defeated Councilor First District Councilor Gigi De Mesa.

Party	Candidate	Votes	%
Liberal	Arnel Cerafica	37,556	63.81
Nacionalista	Gigi De Mesa	17,686	30.05
Margin of victory		19,870	33.76%
Invalid or blank votes		3,614	6.14
Total votes		58,856	100.00
Liberal hold			

==== Second District ====
Former Rep. Henry Dueñas Jr. was defeated by Fort Bonifacio Barangay Chairman Lino Cayetano.

Congressional Elections in Taguig's Second District
Party	Candidate	Votes	%
Nacionalista	Lino Cayetano	33,177	53.22
NPC	Henry Dueñas Jr.	26,238	42.02
Margin of victory		6,939	11.13%
Invalid or blank votes		2,930	4.70
Total votes		62,345	100.00
Nacionalista hold			

=== For Councilors ===
==== First District ====
City Council Elections in Taguig's First District
Party	Candidate	Votes	%
Nacionalista	Darwin "Win" Icay	20,813	8.23
Nacionalista	Jaime "Jimmy" Labampa	19,651	7.77
Nacionalista	Gamaliel "Gamie" San Pedro	19,097	7.55
Nacionalista	Rommel "Ome" Tanyag	18,960	7.50
Nacionalista	Carlito "Oga" Ogalinola	18,828	7.45
Nacionalista	Rodil Carlos "Tikboy" Marcelino	18,671	7.38
Nacionalista	Ferdinand "Ferdie" Santos	17,170	6.79
Nacionalista	Delio "Dingdong" Santos	16,840	6.66
Kilusang Diwa ng Taguig	Allan Paul Cruz	15,799	6.25
Kilusang Diwa ng Taguig	John Ervic Vijandre	14,773	5.84
Kilusang Diwa ng Taguig	Ronnette "Ronet" Franco	14,033	5.55
Kilusang Diwa ng Taguig	Bill Ray Mariategue	12,988	5.14
Kilusang Diwa ng Taguig	Jeffrey Lontoc	12,055	4.77
Kilusang Diwa ng Taguig	Jesus Jessie Concepcion	11,736	4.64
Kilusang Diwa ng Taguig	Elesus Dumagat	9,983	3.95
Akbayan	Mark Anthony Cruz	3,403	1.35
Independent	Jason Papa	2,548	1.01
Independent	Amy Baquiran	1,854	0.73
UNA	Robel Roy Dela Paz	1,464	0.58
CDP	Kiko Gasgonia	1,360	0.54
Independent	Abukalil Pagelet	833	0.33

==== Second District ====
City Council Elections in Taguig's Second District
Party	Candidate	Votes	%
Nacionalista	Arvin Ian Alit	36,672	8.73
Nacionalista	Erwin "Win" Manalili	31,214	7.43
Nacionalista	Edwin "Jojo" Eron	30,581	7.28
Nacionalista	Ma. Amparo "Pammy" Zamora	30,449	7.25
Nacionalista	Noel "DBoy" Dizon	29,371	6.99
Kilusang Diwa ng Taguig	Michelle Anne "Cheche" Gonzales	29,027	6.91
Nacionalista	Richard Paul Jordan	28,888	6.87
Nacionalista	Maria Mher Supan	27,531	6.55
Kilusang Diwa ng Taguig	Jeffrey "Jeff" Morales	23,691	5.64
Kilusang Diwa ng Taguig	Estella "Estel" Gasgonia	23,351	5.56
Independent	Marco Evangelista	22,160	5.27
Kilusang Diwa ng Taguig	Milagros "Myla" Valencia	21,536	5.12
Kilusang Diwa ng Taguig	Jona Fuentes	19,745	4.70
Kilusang Diwa ng Taguig	Erhard Fontanilla	19,655	4.68
Kilusang Diwa ng Taguig	Marilyn Padlan	18,434	4.39
NPC	Ricardo Gomez Jr.	15,375	3.66
UNA	Arthur Clavo	3,209	0.76
Independent	Ipe Tisoy De Viller	3,058	0.73
Independent	Jhoviniel Capicio	2,254	0.54
Independent	Shain Loar	2,133	0.51
Independent	Fidel Miralees	1,902	0.45
