= 2019 Taguig local elections =

5th city election in Taguig

2019 Taguig mayoral elections
- May 13, 2019
- Turnout: 67.2% ▼3.5 pp
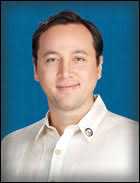

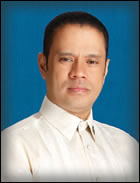
Nominee	Lino Edgardo Cayetano	Arnel Cerafica
Party	Nacionalista	PDP–Laban
Running mate	Ricardo "Ading" Cruz Jr.	Henry "Jun" Dueñas Jr.
Popular vote	175,522	111,460
Percentage	60.87%	38.65%
Mayor before election
Ma. Laarni "Lani" Cayetano
Nacionalista
Elected mayor
Lino Edgardo Cayetano
Nacionalista
- Vice mayoral election
Candidate	Ricardo "Ading" Cruz Jr.	Henry "Jun" Dueñas Jr.
Party	Nacionalista	PDP–Laban
Popular vote	160,490	107,612
Percentage	59.86%	40.14%
Vice Mayor before election
Ricardo "Ading" Cruz Jr.
Nacionalista
Elected Vice Mayor
Ricardo "Ading" Cruz Jr.
Nacionalista
- City Council election

16 of 18 seats in the Taguig City Council 9 seats needed for a majority
	First party	Second party
Party	Nacionalista	PDP–Laban
Last election	16 seats, 85.40%	Did Not Contest
Seats won	16	0
Seat change	Steady	Steady
Popular vote	1,219,115	722,785
Percentage	61.45%	36.43%

Local elections in Taguig were held on May 13, 2019 within the Philippine general election. The voters voted for the elective local posts in the city: the mayor, vice mayor, two district representatives, and councilors, eight in each of the city's two legislative districts.

== Background ==
Mayor Ma. Laarni "Lani" Cayetano was term-limited. She ran as representative of second district instead. Her party chosen former Second District Rep. Lino Edgardo Cayetano to run in her place. He was challenged by First District Rep. Arnel Cerafica who was term-limited too.

Vice Mayor Ricardo "Ading" Cruz Jr. was on his second term, and he ran for re-election for third term. He was challenged by former First District Rep. Henry "Jun" Dueñas Jr.

First District Rep. Arnel Cerafica who was term-limited, and he ran as mayor instead. His party chosen his brother, Allan Cerafica, to run in his place. Cerafica faced former Senator Alan Peter Cayetano, Gloria Cabrera, and Zaman Rajahmuda.

Second District Rep. Pilar Juliana "Pia" Cayetano was on her first term. Although eligible to run for second term, she ran as senator instead. Her party chosen her sister-in-law, Mayor Ma. Laarni "Lani" Cayetano who was term-limited. Cayetano was challenged by former Councilor Michelle Anne "Cheche" Gonzales, who ran last election in the same position.

== Results ==
=== For Mayor ===
Former Second District Rep. Lino Edgardo Cayetano defeated First District Rep. Arnel Cerafica.

Taguig Mayoralty Election
Party	Candidate	Votes	%
Nacionalista	Lino Edgardo Cayetano	175,522	60.87
PDP–Laban	Arnel Cerafica	111,460	38.65
Independent	Sonny Boy Andrade	1,370	0.48
Total votes		288,352	100.00
Nacionalista hold			

=== For Vice Mayor ===
Vice Mayor Ricardo "Ading" Cruz Jr. defeated former Second District Rep. Henry "Jun" Dueñas Jr.

Taguig Vice Mayoralty Election
Party	Candidate	Votes	%
Nacionalista	Ricardo "Ading" Cruz Jr.	160,490	59.86
PDP–Laban	Henry "Jun" Dueñas Jr.	107,612	40.14
Total votes		268,102	100.00
Nacionalista hold			

=== For Representatives ===
==== First District ====
Former Senator Alan Peter Cayetano defeated his closest rival and brother of his predecessor, Allan Cerafica.

Congressional Elections in Taguig's First District
Party	Candidate	Votes	%
Nacionalista	Alan Peter Cayetano	81,243	62.60
PDP–Laban	Allan Cerafica	47,784	36.82
Independent	Gloria Cabrera	637	0.49
PFP	Zaman Rajahmuda	119	0.09
Total votes		156,595	100.00%
Nacionalista hold			

==== Second District ====
Mayor Ma. Laarni "Lani" Cayetano defeated former Councilor Michelle Anne Gonzales.

Congressional Elections in Taguig's Second District
Party	Candidate	Votes	%
Nacionalista	Ma. Laarni Cayetano	113,226	72.94
PDP–Laban	Michelle Anne "Cheche" Gonzales	42,012	27.06
Total votes		155,238	100.00
Nacionalista hold			

=== For Councilors ===
==== First District ====
City Council Elections in Taguig's First District
Party	Candidate	Votes	%
Nacionalista	Darwin "Win" Icay	75,838	
Nacionalista	Allan Paul Cruz	71,765	
Nacionalista	Rommel "Ome" Tanyag	69,973	
Nacionalista	Baby Gloria "Gigi" De Mesa	69,375	
Nacionalista	Jaime "Jimmy" Labampa	69,096	
Nacionalista	Ryanne Gutierrez	64,430	
Nacionalista	Ferdinand "Ferdie" Santos	64,378	
Nacionalista	Raul Aquino	59,690	
PDP–Laban	Anggus Rowe Icay	50,770	
PDP–Laban	Warren Dionisio	49,171	
PDP–Laban	Rhobi-zen "Obi" Ignacio	47,437	
PDP–Laban	Cirio Cyr Tiñga	45,052	
PDP–Laban	John John "Jonjon" Bautista	44,956	
PDP–Laban	Warren Delos Santos	44,561	
PDP–Laban	Janine Faderog	40,434	
PDP–Laban	Jay-RJ Eric Bernal	30,889	
Independent	Arnold Peralta	5,901	
Total votes		903,716	100.00

Party	Votes	%	Seats
Nacionalista Party	544,545	60.26	8
PDP-Laban	353,270	39.09	0
Independent	5,901	0.65	0
Total	903,716	100.00	8

==== Second District ====
City Council Elections in Taguig's Second District
Party	Candidate	Votes	%
Nacionalista	Arvin Ian Alit	97,939	
Nacionalista	Maria Amparo "Pammy" Zamora	94,463	
Nacionalista	Erwin "Win" Manalili	89,653	
Nacionalista	Noel "DBoy" Dizon	87,901	
Nacionalista	Maria Mher Supan	81,344	
Nacionalista	Yasser Pangandaman	80,696	
Nacionalista	Jaime Garcia	75,190	
Nacionalista	Marisse Eron	67,384	
PDP–Laban	Pat Henry Dueñas	67,071	
PDP–Laban	Ma. Rebecca "Rica" Tiñga	64,599	
PDP–Laban	Lauro "Larry" German	42,799	
PDP–Laban	Oscar "Oca" Dio	42,312	
PDP–Laban	Basilio Pooten	40,823	
PDP–Laban	Glenn Sacay	39,256	
PDP–Laban	Ignacio "Jun" Rivera Jr.	37,222	
PDP–Laban	Arthur "Art" Flores	35,433	
Independent	Glenn Albano	23,136	
Independent	Lorenzo Lorono	6,860	
Independent	Arthur Clavo	6,189	
Total votes		1,080,270	100.00

Party	Votes	%	Seats
Nacionalista Party	674,570	62.44	8
PDP-Laban	369,515	34.21	0
Independent	36,185	3.35	0
Total	1,080,270	100.00	8
