= Matias Defensor Jr. =

Filipino politician

Matias Defensor
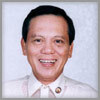
- Official portrait, 2004

Member of Philippine House of Representatives from Quezon City's 3rd congressional district
- In office June 30, 2004 – June 30, 2010
- Preceded by: Ma. Theresa Defensor
- Succeeded by: Jorge John B. Banal Jr.

Personal details
- Born: Matias Villarico Defensor Jr. September 23, 1943 (age 83)
- Party: Independent (2015–present)
- Other political affiliations: UNA (2012–2015); Lakas–CMD (2007–2012); Liberal (until 2007)
- Spouse: Florence Tan
- Children: Mike Defensor; Ma. Theresa Defensor
- Relatives: Miriam Defensor Santiago (cousin)

Matias "Mat" Villarico Defensor Jr. (born September 23, 1943) is a Filipino lawyer, politician, and former newspaper columnist.

A graduate of the University of the Philippines College of Law, Defensor was a prominent lawyer during the administration of President Ferdinand Marcos, writing a column for the newspaper Business Day and serving as spokesman of the Marcos-Tolentino Movement that supported Marcos' presidential campaign in the 1986 snap election. After Marcos' ouster in the People Power Revolution in 1986, Defensor became the spokesman of politician Ramon Mitra Jr.. In 2004, he began representing the 3rd district of Quezon City under Lakas–CMD at the House of Representatives, serving for two terms from 2004 to 2010. He failed to win a third term in 2010 elections, losing to Jorge Banal. He ran again for the same position in the 2013 elections but lost.

He is married to Florence Defensor. He is the father of Mike Defensor and Ma. Theresa Defensor, both former congressmen of the same district he represented. Mike represented the district for two terms (1995–1998 and 1998–2001) while Ma. Theresa for one term (2001–2004). His father, Matias Defensor Sr. served as vice mayor of Quezon City from 1946 to 1947.

House of Representatives of the Philippines
Preceded by Ma. Theresa Defensor	Member of the House of Representatives from Quezon City's 3rd district 2004–2010	Succeeded by Jorge Banal Jr.
