= Lino Cayetano =

Filipino politician and television director

- Official Portrait, 2026

31st Secretary of the Presidential Communications Office
- Ad interim
- Assumed office October 13, 2026
- President: Bongbong Marcos
- Preceded by: Dave Gomez

General Manager of the People's Television Network
- In office June 4, 2026 – October 12, 2026
- President: Bongbong Marcos
- Preceded by: Malou Choa-Fagar
- Succeeded by: Marie Therese D. Nicolas (OIC)

24th Mayor of Taguig
- In office June 30, 2019 – June 30, 2022
- Vice Mayor: Ading Cruz Jr.
- Preceded by: Lani Cayetano
- Succeeded by: Lani Cayetano

Member of the Philippine House of Representatives from Taguig–Pateros's 2nd congressional district
- In office June 30, 2013 – June 30, 2016
- Preceded by: Sigfrido Tiñga
- Succeeded by: Pia Cayetano

Barangay Chairman of Fort Bonifacio, Taguig
- In office October 30, 2010 – June 29, 2013
- Succeeded by: Wilfredo Sayson

Personal details
- Born: Lino Edgardo Schramm Cayetano; January 4, 1978 (age 48) Makati, Philippines
- Party: NPC (2024–present)
- Other political affiliations: Nacionalista (2012–2024)
- Spouse: Fille Cainglet (m. 2013)
- Relations: Pia Cayetano (sister); Alan Peter Cayetano (brother); Lani Cayetano (sister-in-law)
- Children: 3
- Parent: Rene Cayetano (father)
- Education: University of the Philippines Diliman
- Occupation: Director; politician

Lino Edgardo Schramm Cayetano (Tagalog: [ˈlinɔ kajɛˈtano]; born January 4, 1978) is a Filipino politician and television director who has served as the 31st secretary of the Presidential Communications Office since October 13, 2026, previously served as the general manager of the People's Television Network from June 4, 2026 to October 12, 2026.

He previously served as the mayor of Taguig from 2019 to 2022, representative of the 2nd district of Taguig from 2013 to 2016, and the barangay chairman of Fort Bonifacio, Taguig from 2010 to 2013. Before entering politics, he was a television director for several programs on ABS-CBN.

Cayetano was born to a political family based in Taguig. His father was former senator Rene Cayetano; his older siblings, Pia and Alan Peter, are incumbent senators; and Alan Peter's wife, Lani, is the incumbent mayor of Taguig.

== Early life and education ==
Lino Cayetano was born on January 4, 1978 to Filipino politician Rene Cayetano and German-American school teacher Sandra "Sandy" Schramm Cayetano. He has three older siblings: Pilar Juliana ("Pia", born 1966), Alan Peter (born 1970), and Rene Carl ("Ren", born 1973).

Cayetano received his Bachelor of Arts degree in film and audio-visual communications from the University of the Philippines Diliman in the 1990s, and later received a diploma from the New York Film Academy. By the early 2000s, Cayetano was teaching film classes in UP Diliman.

== Entertainment career ==
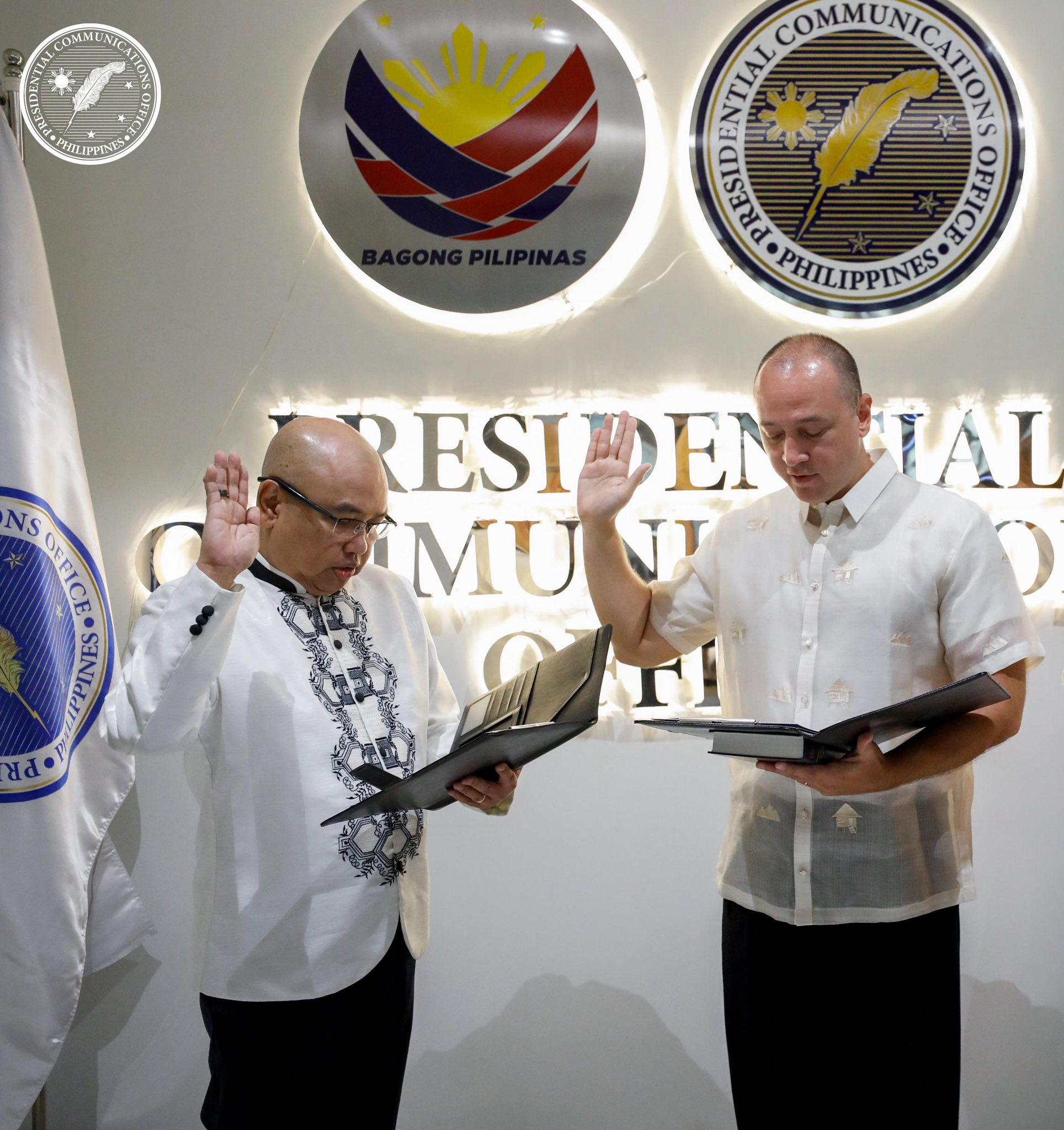
Cayetano (right) being sworn in as the new general manager of People's Television Network in 2026

Cayetano started his directorial work in 2003 for the first season of GMA's talent reality show StarStruck. In May 2004, he directed an episode of Maalaala Mo Kaya about the life of his father Rene, entitled "Upuan".

Cayetano then collaborated with Maryo J. de los Reyes to direct two television dramas in ABS-CBN, Mga Anghel na Walang Langit and Calla Lily. He also directed the singing competition series, Little Big Star. Among other notable projects that he directed for ABS-CBN are the television series Aryana, Noah, Tanging Yaman, Kung Ako'y Iiwan Mo, Growing Up, and several episodes of the anthology series Ipaglaban Mo! and Maalaala Mo Kaya.

Cayetano returned to directing in 2016 as one of the directors of ABS-CBN's primetime drama series My Super D, together with Frasco Mortiz, after a three-year break.

After his mayoral stint, Cayetano returned to directing in 2024 as one of the directors of ABS-CBN's primetime drama series High Street. In 2025, he directed the thriller film Salvageland. In 2026, Cayetano served as executive producer of the limited series Drug War: A Conspiracy of Silence through his production company Rein Entertainment. Set during the Philippine drug war under President Rodrigo Duterte, the series was initially revealed by Cayetano and other crew members at the Asian Contents and Film Market in Busan, South Korea in October 2024.

In 2026, Cayetano was appointed as general manager of the state-owned People's Television Network by president Bongbong Marcos.

== Political career ==
Official Portrait of Lino Cayetano during the 16th Congress of the Philippines

In 2010, Cayetano finally decided to enter politics as a barangay captain of Fort Bonifacio. He was later elected as congressman of Taguig's 2nd district in 2013 at the age of 36, and under the Nacionalista Party. In his first days in office, Cayetano filed the "Iskolar ng Bayan" bill, that first implemented in the city. In the bill, all graduates and Top 10 of their classes from high schools automatically become scholars in state-owned universities including the University of the Philippines.

Three years later, he filed the certificate of candidacy to seek a reelection as representative in 2016, but he decided to withdraw to give way to his sister Pia as his replacement. Pia eventually won the race.

In 2019, he successfully ran for Mayor of Taguig, succeeding his sister-in-law Lani Cayetano. He served for only one term as mayor and stepped down in 2022. As mayor, he supported President Rodrigo Duterte, calling himself a "certified "DDS". He also supported the unsuccessful 2022 presidential bid of Isko Moreno, who was his fellow mayor in Metro Manila.

In 2024, he filed his candidacy to run for representative of Taguig–Pateros's 1st District in the 2025 Philippine general election. Among his campaign promises was the creation of a third congressional district for Taguig representing the Embo barangays, which were then newly-transferred to Taguig from Makati. However, on October 30, the Election Registration Board (ERB) of the Commission on Elections (Comelec) in Taguig rejected Lino and Fille Cayetano's application to transfer their voter registration to Taguig's 1st district, citing unmet residency requirements. He ran under the BIDA TAYO ticket, opposite to Lani Cayetano's Team TLC. However, he lost the race to incumbent Representative Ricardo "Ading" Cruz Jr., who was once his vice mayoralty running mate in 2019.

In October 2025, Cayetano made a statement toward remarks made by his brother, Senator Alan Peter Cayetano, proposing for a mass resignation from the Philippine government and holding a snap election amidst the flood control projects controversy: "I agree with my brother Alan and ask that we start with ourselves. Give up power[....] If you truly believe what you say, then trust and have faith that if some of the old guard step down now – it will inspire others to follow. I will support further that no Cayetano should run in 2028."

== Personal life ==
Cayetano was involved in different relationships with Kris Aquino, Shaina Magdayao, KC Concepcion, and Bianca Gonzales.

Cayetano is married to former Ateneo Lady Eagles volleyball player Fille Cainglet. Cayetano and Cainglet met each other in an all-star volleyball tournament in the summer of 2013, with their wedding held later that year on December 27 in Mactan, Cebu.

The couple's first child is a son. On August 8, 2016, the couple had their second child, a daughter. On March 3, 2018, their third child was born.

In February 2003, Lino donated a portion of his liver to his ailing father, Senator Rene Cayetano, who had been undergoing treatment for hepatitis B at the USC University Hospital in the United States; Rene later died due to complications from liver cancer in June 2003. Three months after his liver donation, Lino participated in a triathlon to demonstrate his good health to his father after the latter expressed concern for his organ donation. He was also a player for the UP men's volleyball team.

Cayetano is a born-again Christian.

== Electoral history ==
Electoral history of Lino Cayetano
Year	Office	Party	Votes received				Result
Year	Office	Party	Total	%	P.	Swing	Result
2013	Representative (Taguig–2nd)	Nacionalista	33,177	53.22%	1st	—N/a	Won
2019	Mayor of Taguig	Nacionalista	175,522	60.87%	1st	—N/a	Won
2025	Representative (Taguig–1st)	NPC	72,007	31.57%	2nd	—N/a	Lost

== Filmography ==
=== Film ===
==== As director ====
- I've Fallen for You (2007)
- Salvageland (2025)

==== As producer only ====
- Ang Mga Kidnaper ni Ronnie Lazaro (2012)
- You Have Arrived (2019)
- Nanahimik ang Gabi (executive producer, 2022)
- Elevator (executive producer, 2024)
- The Caretakers (executive producer, 2025)

House of Representatives of the Philippines
Preceded by Sigfrido Tiñga	Member of the House of Representatives from Taguig's 2nd district 2013–2016	Succeeded by Pia Cayetano
Political offices
Preceded by Lani Cayetano	Mayor of Taguig; 2019–2022	Succeeded by Lani Cayetano
