= George Elias =

Vice Mayor of Taguig

George A. Elias

Vice Mayor of Taguig
- In office June 30, 2004 – June 30, 2013
- Mayor: Sigfrido Tiñga (2004–2010); Lani Cayetano (2010–2013)
- Preceded by: Loida L. Alzona
- Succeeded by: Ricardo S. Cruz, Jr.

Member of the Taguig Municipal Council from the 1st district
- In office June 30, 1995 – June 30, 2004

Personal details
- Born: April 23, 1959 (age 67) Taguig, Rizal, Philippines
- Party: Kilusang Diwa ng Taguig (2009-present); Silbi (2021-present)
- Other party: Liberal (2009-2021); Lakas–CMD (1995-2009)
- Spouse: Teresita Elias
- Occupation: Politician, Engineer

George A. Elias (born 1959) is a Filipino politician who served as the Vice Mayor of Taguig, Philippines from 2004 until 2013. He is also the former President of Taguig City University.

== Profile ==
In 2001–2004, he was Consultant of Legal & Legislative Affairs. In 1995–2001, he was Municipal Councilor of Taguig and Secretary of Municipal Council of Taguig. He has Bachelor of Science in Industrial Engineering from Mapua Institute of Technology and Bachelor of Law from Jose Rizal University.
