= Lani Cayetano =

Filipino politician

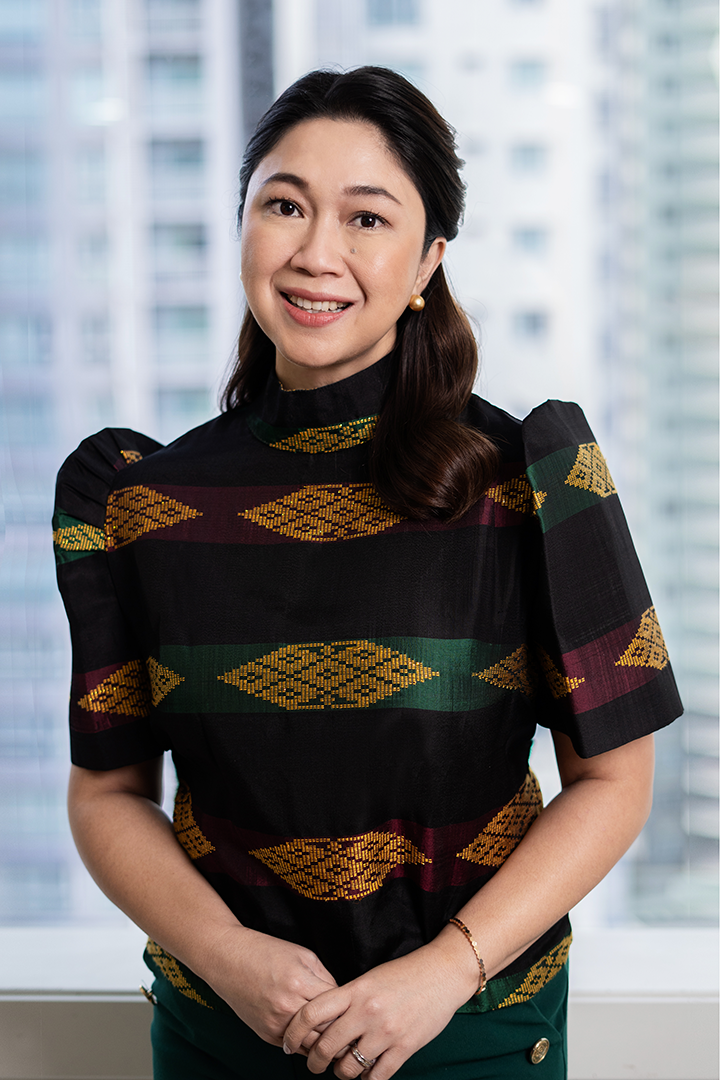
- Portrait as Mayor of Taguig

23rd & 25th Mayor of Taguig
- Incumbent
- Assumed office June 30, 2022
- Vice Mayor: Arvin Ian Alit
- Preceded by: Lino Cayetano
- In office June 30, 2010 – June 30, 2019
- Vice Mayor: George Elias (2010–2013); Ading Cruz Jr. (2013–2019)
- Preceded by: Sigfrido Tiñga
- Succeeded by: Lino Cayetano

Member of the Philippine House of Representatives from Taguig–Pateros
- In office June 30, 2019 – June 30, 2022
- Preceded by: Pia Cayetano
- Succeeded by: Pammy Zamora
- Constituency: Taguig-Pateros's 2nd congressional district
- In office June 30, 2007 – June 30, 2010
- Preceded by: Post created
- Succeeded by: Arnel Cerafica
- Constituency: Taguig–Pateros's 1st congressional district

President of the Senate Spouses Foundation, Inc.
- In office May 11, 2026 – June 3, 2026
- Preceded by: Helen Gamboa-Sotto
- Succeeded by: Alexandra Kyra Gatchalian

Personal details
- Born: Maria Laarni Clariño Lopez; December 11, 1981 (age 44) Tiwi, Albay, Philippines
- Party: Nacionalista (2007-Present)
- Spouse: Alan Peter Cayetano (m. 2004)
- Education: Centro Escolar University (BA)
- Occupation: Politician

Maria Laarni "Lani" Lopez Cayetano (born Maria Laarni Clariño Lopez; December 11, 1981) is a Filipina politician who has served as the 25th mayor of Taguig since 2022. She previously served as the city's 23rd mayor from 2010 to 2019 and as representative of Taguig–Pateros's 1st district from 2007 to 2010 and its 2nd district from 2019 to 2022.

She is the wife of former Senate President Alan Peter Cayetano.

== Early life ==
Cayetano completed a special course in Innovative and Developmental Local Governance and Policy Making for Local Chief Executives and Legislators at the University of the Philippines Diliman and a Bachelor of Arts degree in Mass Communication from Centro Escolar University.

== Political career ==
=== House of Representatives (2007–2010) ===
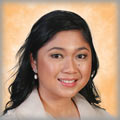
Official Portrait of Lani Cayetano During the 14th Congress of the Philippines

Cayetano was 22 when she established the Progressive Ladies' League of the Philippines (PLLP), an organization that promotes women's rights and welfare. Starting with 1,300 members, PLLP now has more than 16,000 members. At the age of 23, she put up the Angat Lahat Multi-Purpose Cooperative to help people find an alternative source of income through various livelihood undertakings. She was 25 years old when she became the first female representative of Taguig-Pateros and the first of its new 1st congressional district in Congress in 2007. She also became the youngest elected President of Zonta Club of Pateros and Taguig from 2008 to 2010.

For her notable achievements as a young leader, she was cited as One of the Most Distinguished Alumna of Centro Escolar University in 2008. In 2009, she earned the United Nations Associations of the Philippines recognition for her accomplishments in Politics and Government Service. She also received distinctions from other groups, including a commendation from her fellow members of Congress.

=== Mayor of Taguig (2010–2019) ===
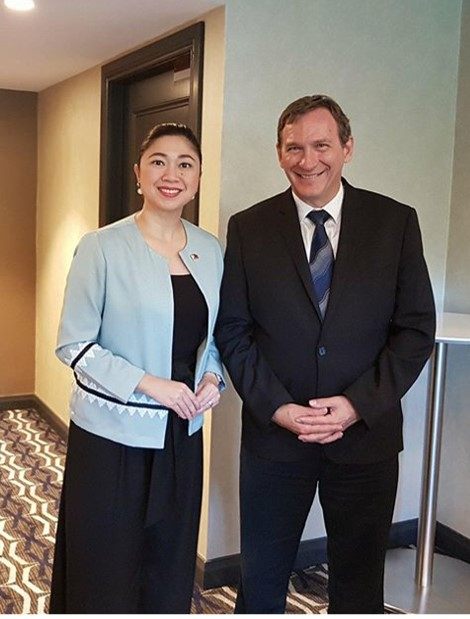
Cayetano and Blacktown Mayor Stephen Bali in Sydney, Australia in 2018

At the age of 28, Cayetano was elected as the first female Mayor of Taguig in 2010 and is among the youngest local chief executives of a highly urbanized city in the Philippines. She won in a tight race against former Supreme Court Associate Justice Dante Tiñga with a slim margin of 2,420 votes. As a result, Tiñga filed an electoral protest due to alleged vote irregularities and vote-counting machine tampering, but the protest was eventually dismissed. She was reelected in 2013 and in 2016.

In March 2017, Cayetano was appointed by President Rodrigo Duterte to the Legislative-Executive Development Advisory Council (LEDAC) as Representative for Local Government Units. She used this opportunity to promote the ideals of the President.

=== House of Representatives (2019–2022) ===
Official Portrait of Lani Cayetano during the 18th Congress of the Philippines

In October 2018, Cayetano filed her Certificate of Candidacy (COC) to run for representative of Taguig's 2nd District. Her candidacy faced disqualification cases for not possessing the minimum residency qualification and she and her husband Alan, both running for representative of two separate districts of Taguig–Pateros, claimed living in separate residences as indicated on their respective COCs, which violates Article 69 of the Family Code. The case was later dismissed on May 7, 2019. On May 14, 2019, she was elected as representative of Taguig's 2nd District after defeating former councilor Che-Che Gonzales. Her brother-in-law, Lino Cayetano, was elected as her successor as Taguig's mayor after defeating outgoing Taguig–Pateros 1st district representative Arnel Cerafica. Her husband Alan Peter Cayetano was also elected as representative of Taguig–Pateros's 1st District after defeating Allan Cerafica, the outgoing representative's brother. She only served for one term ending in 2022.

=== Mayor of Taguig (2022–present) ===
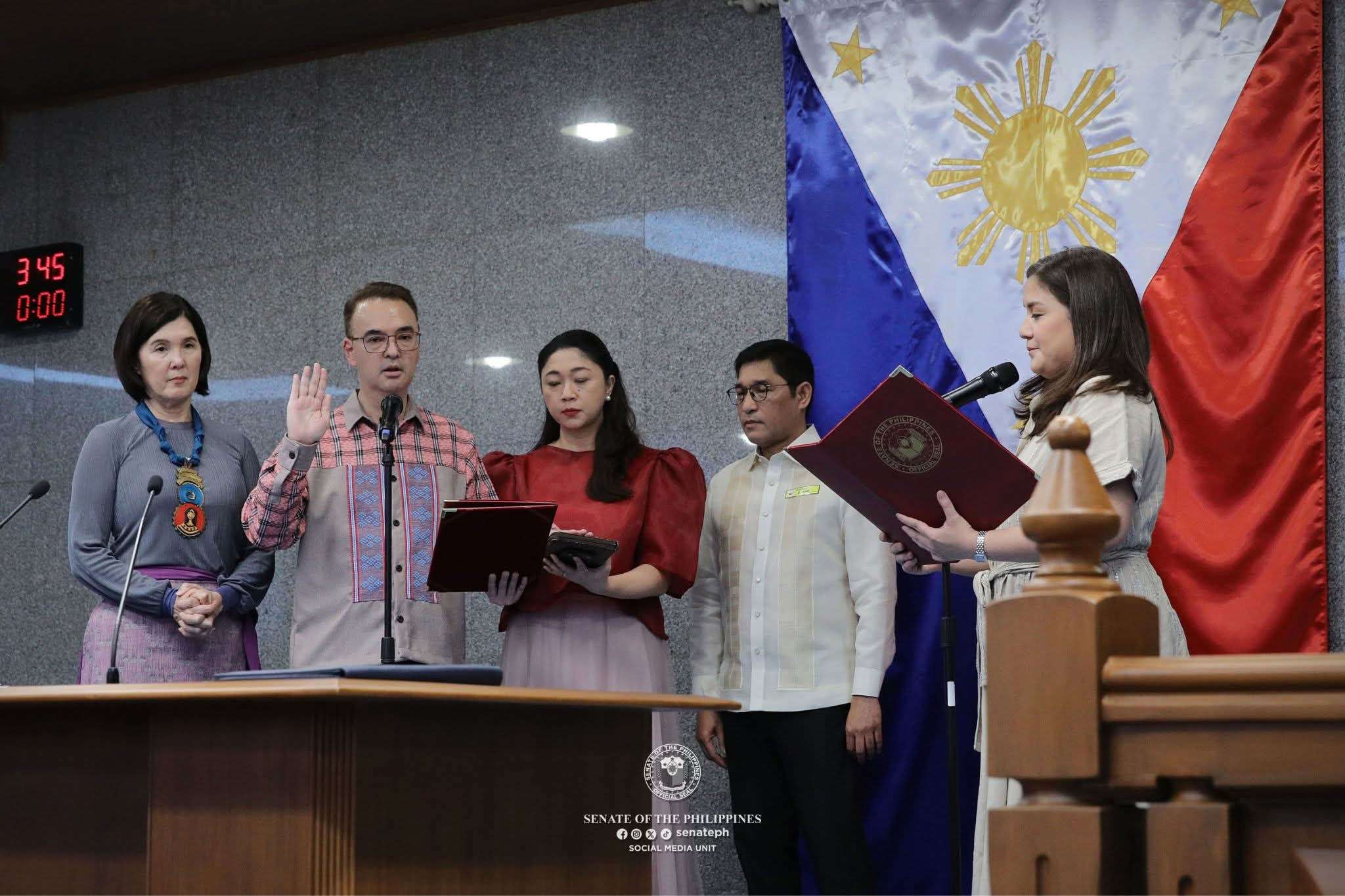
Cayetano (center) holding a Bible during the oathtaking of her husband Alan Peter Cayetano (2nd from left) as Senate President on May 11, 2026

In 2022, Cayetano ran for Mayor of Taguig and eventually won, earning her fourth term. Her fourth term saw the territorial expansion of Taguig due to the transfer of the Embo barangays from Makati, following the Supreme Court of the Philippines's 2023 ruling in favor of Taguig in the decades-long boundary dispute. On March 5, 2024, four Makati City Government employees sued Cayetano, city administrator Jose Luis Montales, and other Taguig officials before the Taguig City Prosecutor's Office for illegal detention following the March 1 standoff at Makati Park and Garden (now Taguig People's Park). The charges were dismissed later that year due to lack of evidence.

Cayetano was re-elected in 2025. From May to June 2026, she became President of the Senate Spouses Foundation, Inc. while her husband Alan Peter Cayetano was the Senate President.

== Advocacies ==
=== 10K Ayuda ===
An economic stimulus program that provides ₱10,000 to families, alleviating the effects of the pandemic by helping them with loan payments, purchase of daily necessities, and most especially to start/finance a small business that will sustain their livelihood. As a result, this will collectively revitalize the economy.

=== Regularization and Benefits for Barangay Health Workers ===
Barangay health workers had been denied compensation matching their responsibility towards improving healthcare including natal care, infant vaccinations, and children's nutrition. They had also been facing risks working during the COVID-19 pandemic. Filing measures that would allocate funds to better compensate them, contractual workers and regular government workers would reciprocate the time, effort, and skills they exert in maintaining our citizens’ health.

=== Establishment of Safe Pathways Network of Bicycle Lanes and Slow Streets ===
The host of negative effects of COVID-19 in the country's health, mobility, and economy amplified the need for alternative modes of transportation that are safe and convenient. Biking to work, in particular, has offered front liners a safe transport mode that doubles as a mental break. Allocating funds for the establishment of kilometers-long, meters-wide protected bike lane network will provide these benefits to essential workers and all Filipinos during the pandemic and beyond.

== Electoral history ==
Electoral history of Lani Cayetano
Year	Office	Party	Votes received				Result
Year	Office	Party	Total	%	P.	Swing	Result
2007	Representative (Taguig-Pateros–1st)	Nacionalista			1st	—N/a	Won
2010	Mayor of Taguig	Nacionalista	95,865	50.53%	1st	—N/a	Won
2013	Mayor of Taguig	Nacionalista	60,922	60.86%	1st	+10.33	Won
2016	Mayor of Taguig	Nacionalista	224,981	100%	1st	+39.14	Unopposed
2022	Mayor of Taguig	Nacionalista	272,876	75.77%	1st	—N/a	Won
2025	Mayor of Taguig	Nacionalista	410,706	78.96%	1st	+3.19	Won
2019	Representative (Taguig-Pateros–2nd)	Nacionalista	113,226	72.94%	1st	—N/a	Won

House of Representatives of the Philippines
New district	Member of the House of Representatives from Taguig-Pateros's 1st district June 30, 2007 – June 30, 2010	Succeeded by Arnel Cerafica
Preceded by Pia Cayetano	Member of the House of Representatives from Taguig-Pateros's 2nd district June 30, 2019 – June 30, 2022	Succeeded by Pammy Zamora
Political offices
Preceded by Sigfrido Tiñga	Mayor of Taguig; June 30, 2010 – June 30, 2019	Succeeded by Lino Cayetano
Preceded by Lino Cayetano	Mayor of Taguig; June 30, 2022–present	Incumbent
