= Kilusang Diwa ng Taguig =

Political party in the Philippines

- President: Sigfrido Tiñga
- Headquarters: Taguig
- Ideology: Liberalism; Conservative liberalism Populism
- Political position: Centre-right
- National affiliation: NUP (2011–present); Liberal (2009–2011)
- Colors: Red and black
- House of Representatives: 0 / 2 (Taguig–Pateros seats only)
- Local councils: 0 / 16

The Kilusang Diwa ng Taguig is a local regional political party in Taguig, Philippines. The party is headed by former Taguig Mayor Sigfrido "Freddie" Tiñga and his father, former Supreme Court Associate Justice Dante Tiñga. It is formerly the ruling political group in Taguig until 2013.

Recently, it was the local affiliate of the Liberal Party from 2009. It is also the local affiliate of the National Unity Party since 2011. Prior to that, it had linkages with Lakas–Kampi, Reporma–LM, the PMM, and the Nationalist People's Coalition.

== Electoral history ==
Following the 2010 elections, it held two seats in the House of Representatives and it caucused with the Liberal Party. Their mayoral bet, Dante Tiñga, who was tapped as the Liberal nominee to succeed his term-limited son, Mayor Sigfrido "Freddie" Tiñga, narrowly lost to Representative Lani Cayetano that year. The party was also related with the elected vice mayor George Elias.

In the 2013 elections, the party also partnered with the Nationalist People's Coalition, but won only 1 out of 16 city council seats dominated by the Nacionalista ticket of incumbent Mayor Cayetano.

== Notable members ==
- Sigfrido Tiñga, Mayor of Taguig
- Ervic Vijandre, Councilor of San Juan, Metro Manila

== Controversy ==
In a political attack in Taguig, 12 of the party's supporters were injured in an attack organized by the City Hall personnel. The injured included actor Ervic Vijandre, a member running for the city council.
