= Arnel Cerafica =

Filipino politician

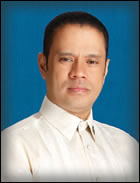
- Cerafica during the 16th Congress

Member of the Philippine House of Representatives from Taguig–Pateros's 1st congressional district
- In office June 30, 2010 – June 30, 2019
- Preceded by: Lani Cayetano
- Succeeded by: Alan Peter Cayetano

Member of the Taguig City Council from the 2nd District
- In office June 30, 2001 – June 30, 2007

Personal details
- Born: February 9, 1965 (age 61) Binangonan, Rizal, Philippines
- Party: PFP (2024–present); KDT (2001–present)
- Other political affiliations: PPP (2021–2024); PDP–Laban (2018–2021); Liberal (2009–2018); Lakas (2001–2009)
- Spouse: Janelle Tolentino
- Education: Far Eastern University (BS)
- Occupation: Businessman
- Profession: Politician, Civil engineer

Arnel Mendiola Cerafica (born February 9, 1965) is a Filipino politician, civil engineer, and businessman. He last served as a member of Philippine House of Representatives representing 1st district of Taguig–Pateros from 2010 to 2019. He was also the Vice Chairman of the House Committee on Health.

Prior to his election to Congress, he served as a councilor from the 1st district of Taguig from 2001 to 2007. He also lost his congressional bid for the newly created 1st district of Taguig–Pateros in 2007. After serving three terms in the Congress, he unsuccessfully ran for Mayor of Taguig in 2019, wherein his supporters protested the results by holding a rally at Carlos P. Garcia Avenue. He also filed an electoral protest to challenge his loss, but was dismissed by the Commission on Elections in 2022 because of insufficient evidence to support alleged irregularities. He once again ran for mayor in 2022 and 2025, both alongside his wife Janelle for vice mayor, but was unsuccessful.

Cerafica earned his bachelor's degree in civil engineering at the Far Eastern University in 1987 as a working student.
