= Sigfrido Tiñga =

Filipino politician and businessman

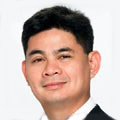

Member of the Philippine House of Representatives from Taguig–Pateros's 2nd congressional district
- In office June 30, 2010 – June 30, 2013
- Preceded by: Angelito Reyes
- Succeeded by: Lino Cayetano

Mayor of Taguig
- In office June 30, 2001 – June 30, 2010
- Vice mayor: Loida Labao-Alzona (2001–2004); George Elias (2004–2010)
- Preceded by: Ricardo Papa Jr.
- Succeeded by: Lani Cayetano

Personal details
- Born: Sigfrido Rodriguez Tiñga; April 16, 1965 (age 61) Pasay City, Metro Manila, Philippines
- Party: Liberal (2009–present); Kilusang Diwa ng Taguig (2001–present)
- Other political affiliations: Lakas (2001–2009)
- Spouse: Kaye Chua (m. 1994)
- Children: 4
- Education: University of the Philippines Diliman (BS); University of Oregon (MBA)
- Occupation: Politician, business executive
- Profession: Businessman

Sigfrido "Freddie" Rodriguez Tiñga (born April 16, 1965) is a Filipino politician and businessman who is currently the founder and president of Global Electric Transport since 2014. He previously served as the representative from Taguig City in the House of Representatives from 2010 to 2013 and as the Mayor of the same city from 2001 to 2010. He is the son of former Philippine Supreme Court Associate Justice Dante Tiñga and Ma. Asuncion Tiñga.

== Profile ==
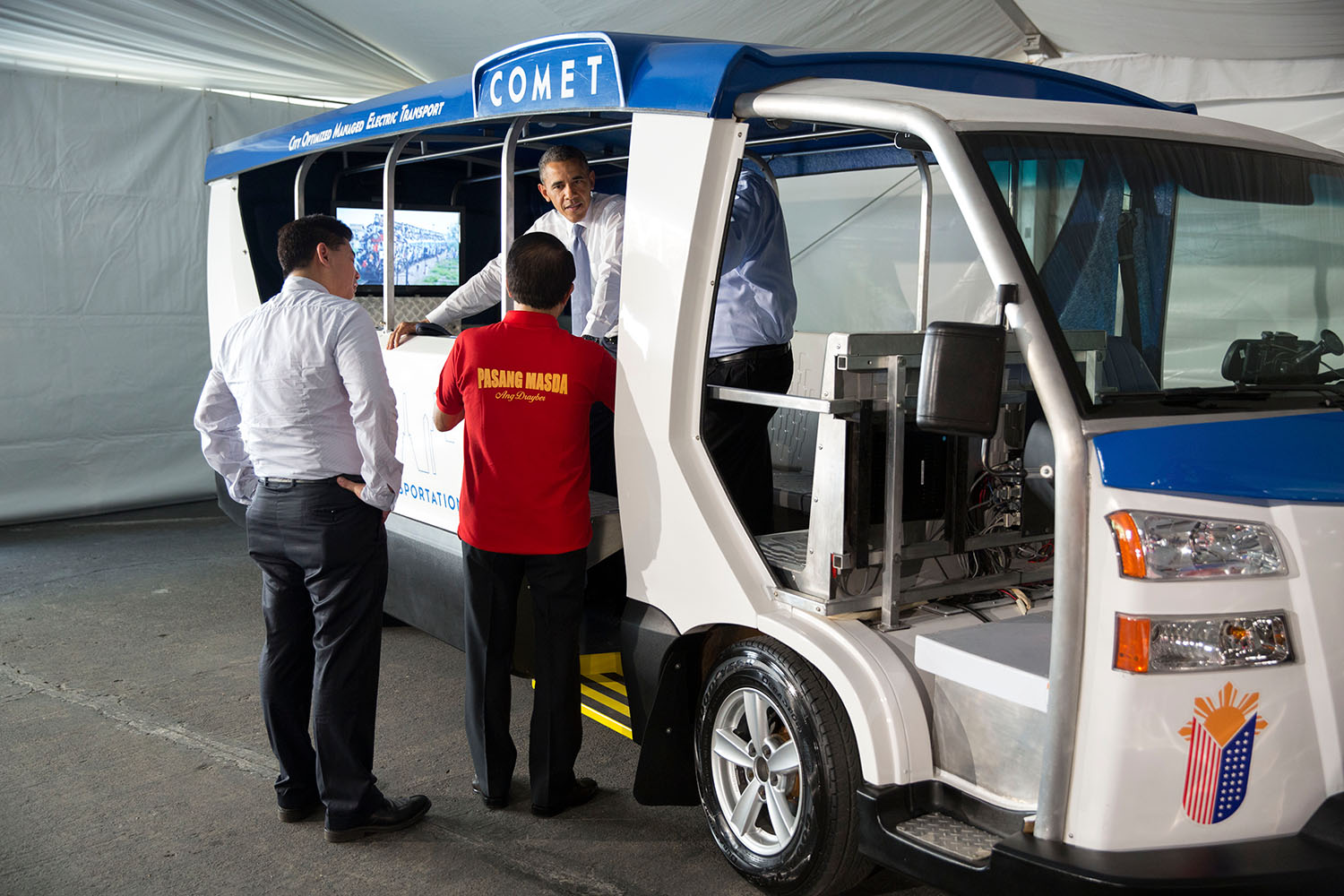
Global Electric Transport president Tiñga (left) looks as US president Barack Obama views the COMET electric vehicle at Sofitel Philippine Plaza Manila, Pasay in 2014

Tiñga received his bachelor's degree at University of the Philippines Diliman in 1986. He then pursued master of business administration from University of Oregon's Charles H. Lundquist College of Business from 1989 to 1991.

He started his career as a technical staff of SGV & Co. in 1986–1988. He then became a staff member in Andersen Consulting, moving to Siemens-Nixdorf, Philippines, in 1988, where he worked as senior project analyst. He lectured on marketing management in the University of the Philippines Graduate School of Business after working as a management associate for Citibank Philippines in 1991–1992. In 1992–1994, he was the administrator of The Livelihood Center. In 1995–1999, he was assistant vice-president for business development in First Pacific/Fort Bonifacio Development Corporation. In 1999, he co-founded K2 Interactive, which specializes in regional strategy consulting, e-business and providing digital designs.

He was then elected Mayor of Taguig in 2001, serving for three terms until 2010. While he was the mayor of the municipality of Taguig (later became a city in 2004), Taguig had the motto "Forward Taguig." In 2010, he was elected representative of Taguig's 2nd district. He only served as congressman for one term as he decided not to seek reelection in 2013 for personal reasons.

He then returned to business, when he became the executive of Global Electric Transport.

== Personal life ==
On July 16, 1994, Tiñga married Kaye Chua, with whom he has four children.
