= Metro Manila =

Metropolitan area and region of the Philippines

Metro Manila Kalakhang Maynila Kamaynilaan
- Metropolitan area and region
- National Capital Region
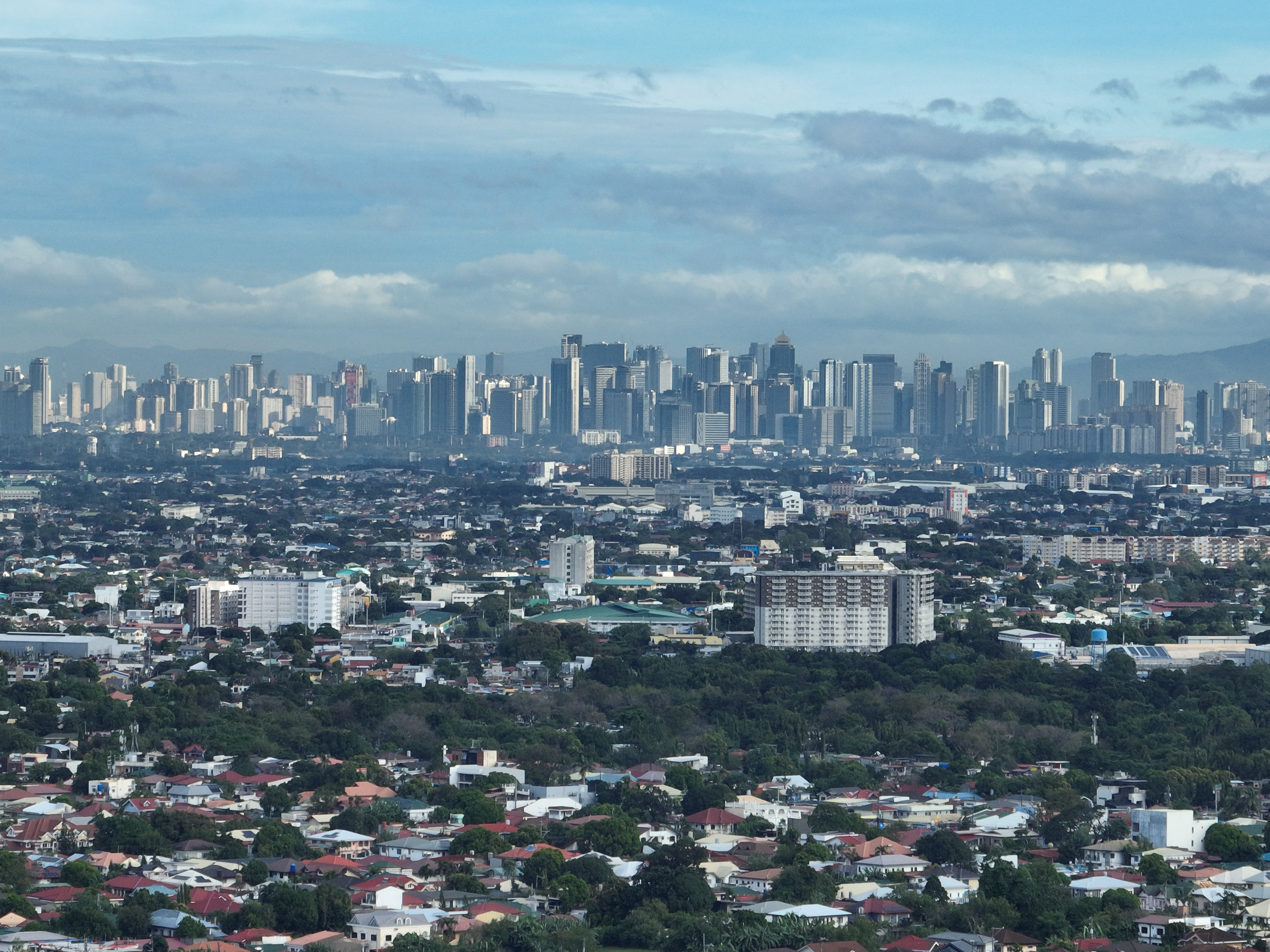
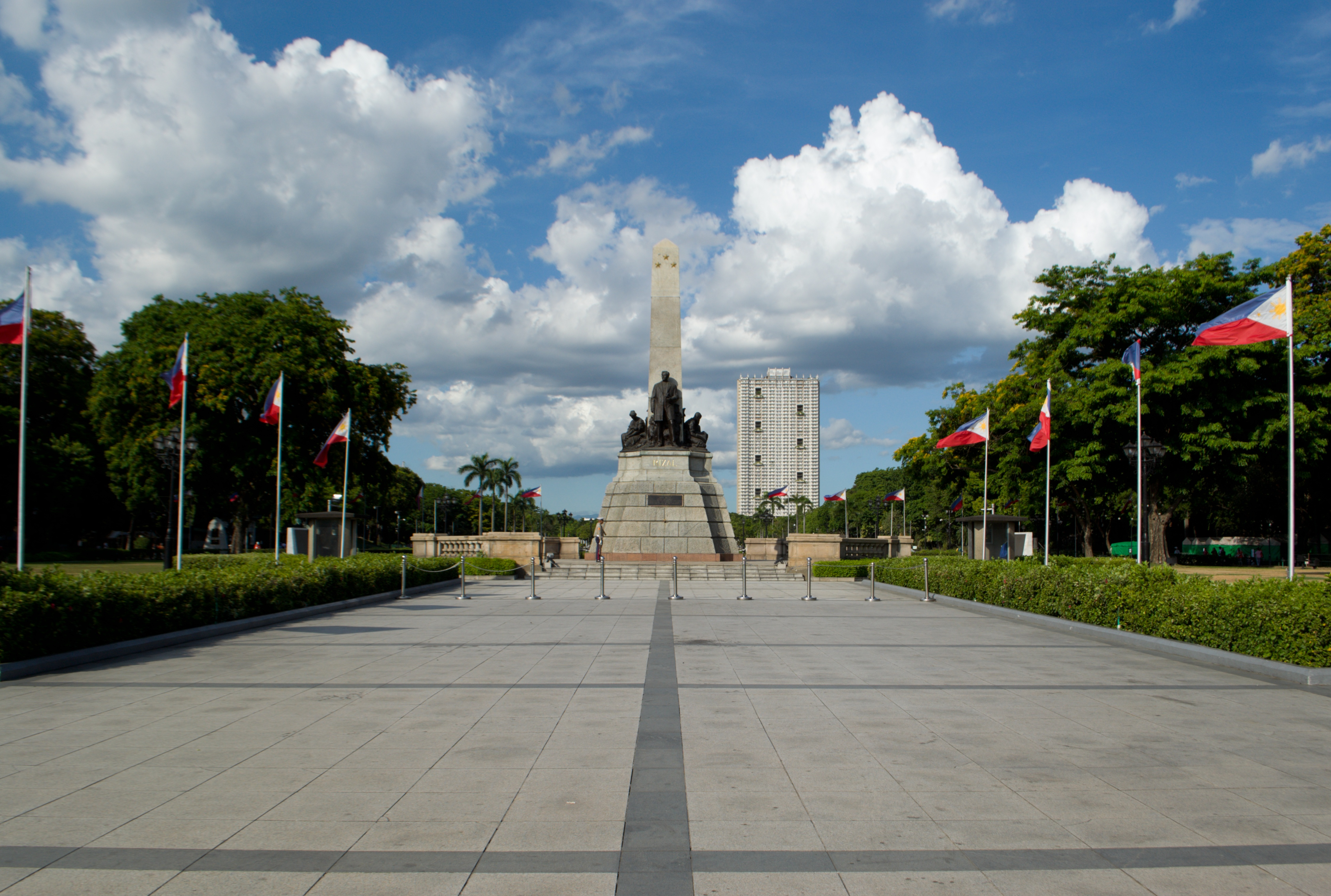
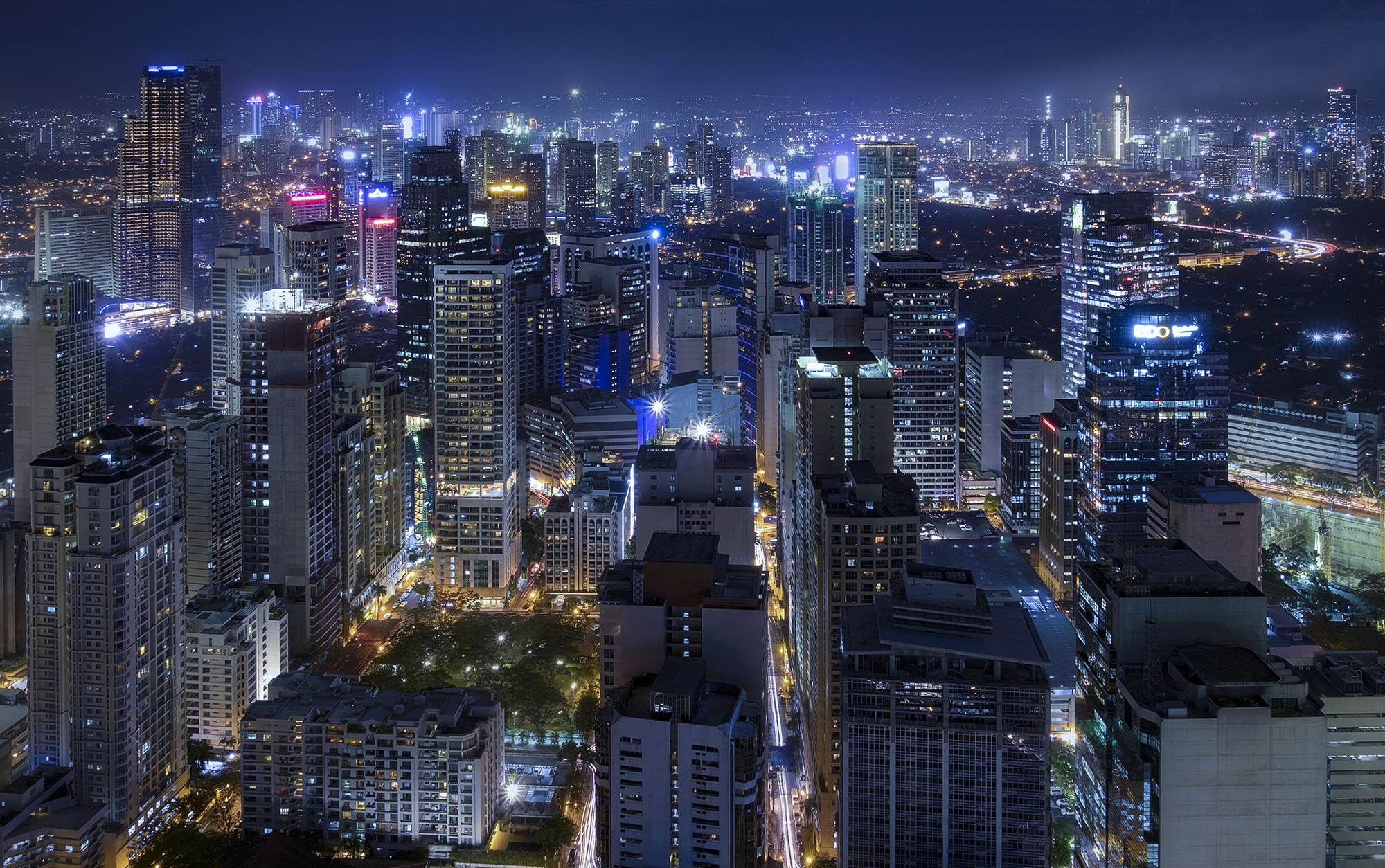
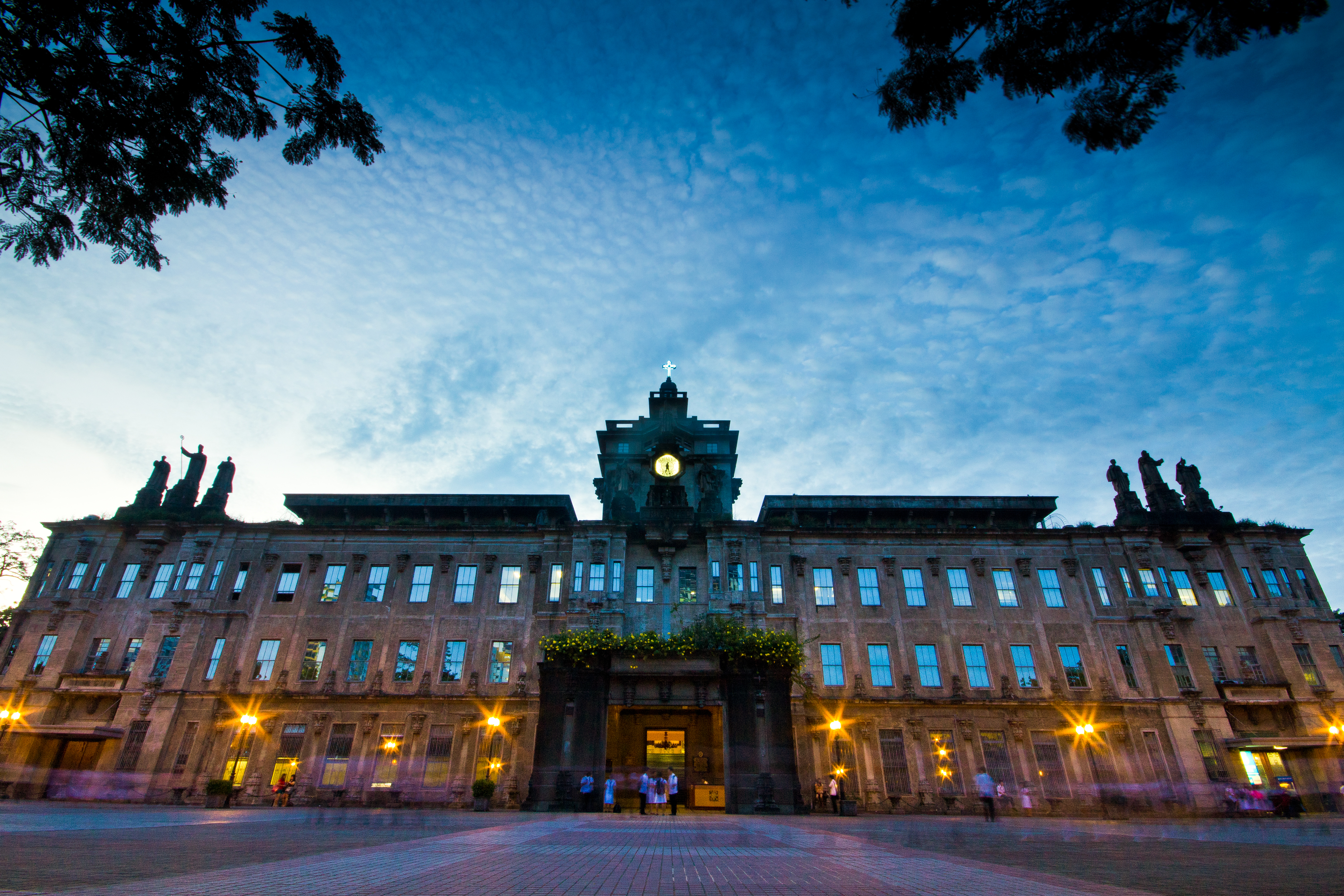
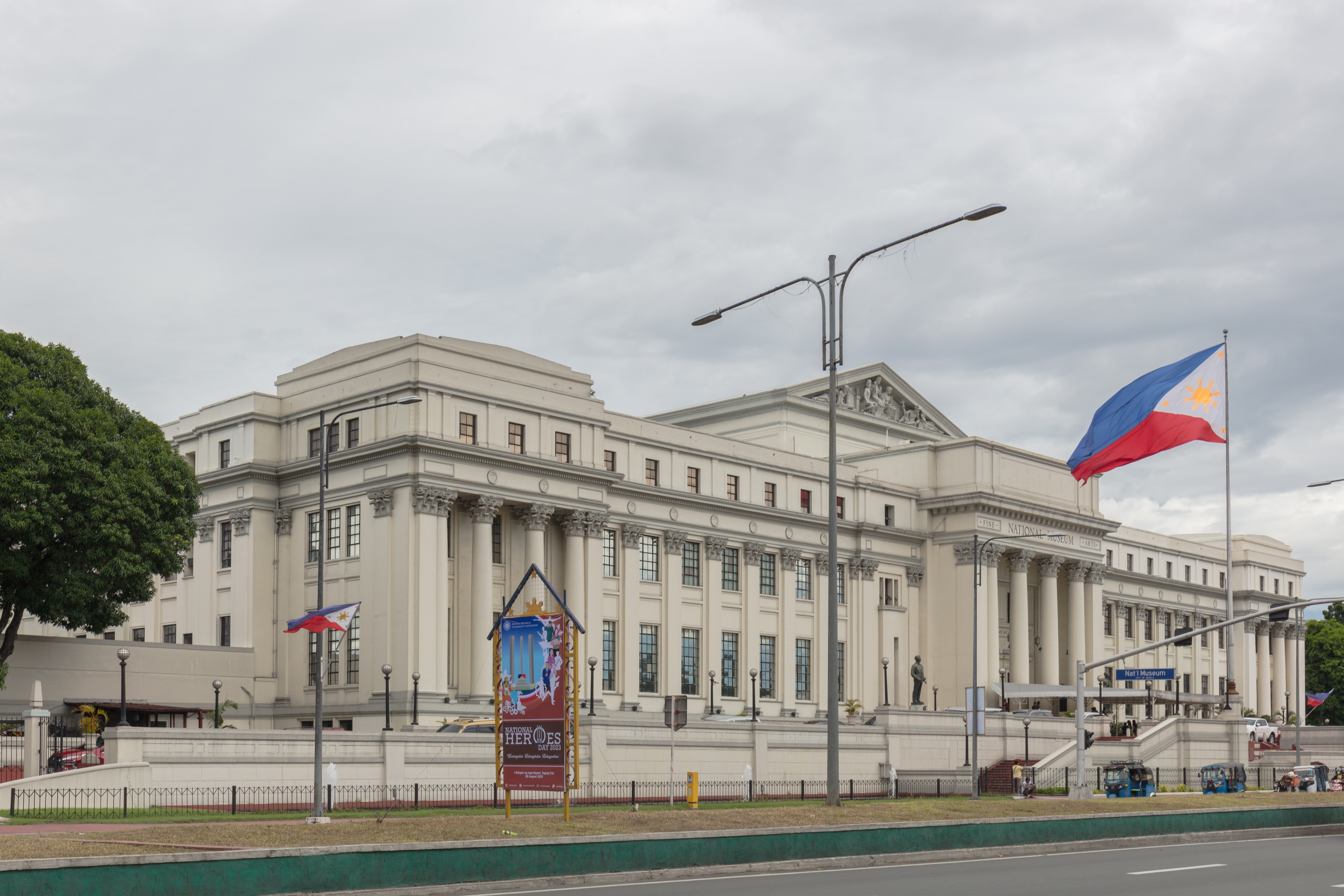
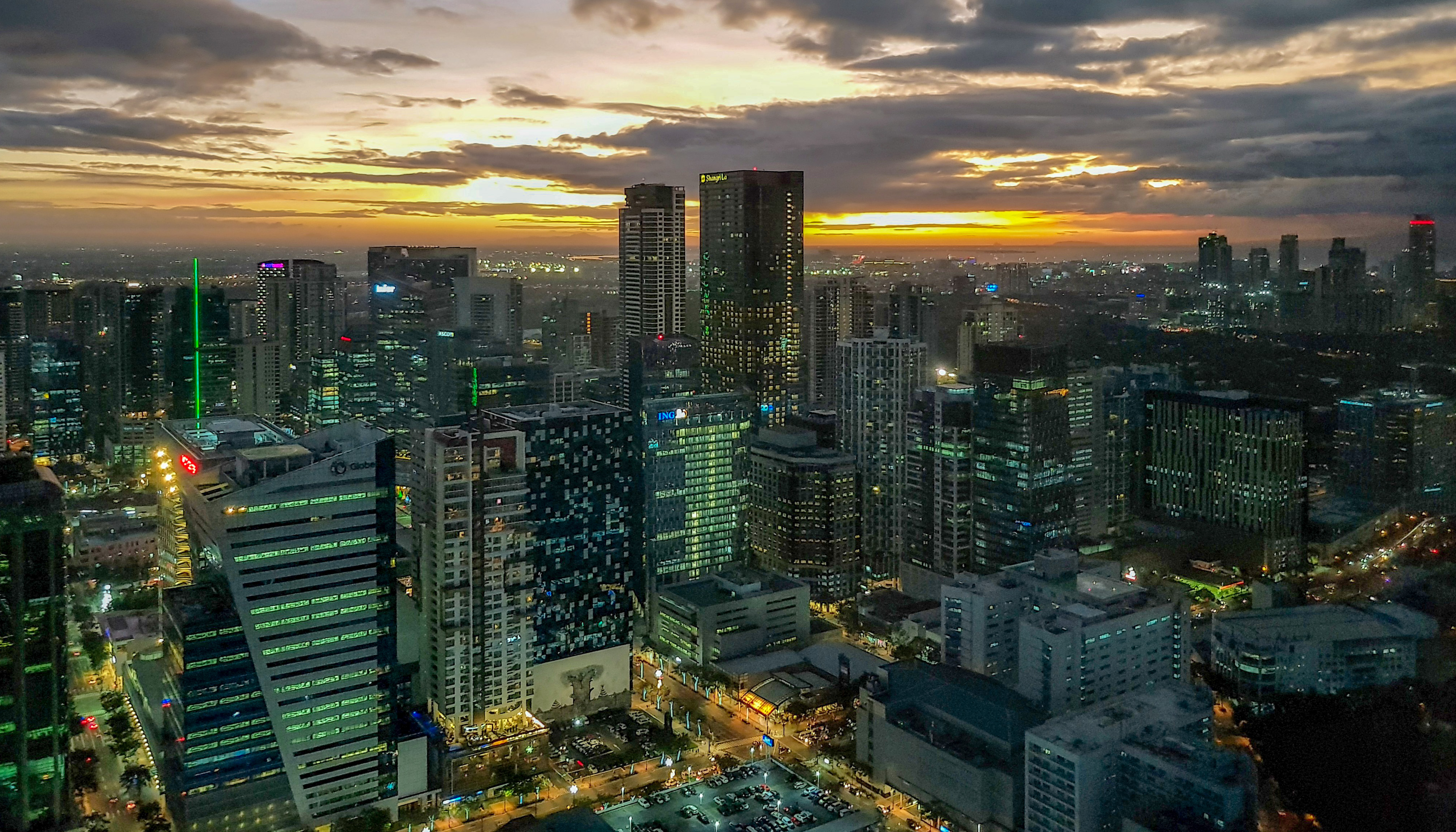
- Skyline of Metro Manila Rizal Park Makati CBD Ortigas Center Quezon Memorial Shrine University of Santo Tomas National Museum of Fine Arts Bonifacio Global City
- Motto(s): Dangal nitong Bayan! (English: "Honor of the Nation!")
- Anthem: NCR Hymn
- Interactive map of Metro Manila
- Location within Luzon Location within Philippines
- Coordinates: 14.58°N 121°E
- Country: Philippines
- Island: Luzon
- Managing entity: Metropolitan Manila Development Authority
- Established: November 7, 1975 (as a public corporation); January 23, 1976 (as a region); June 2, 1978 (as the NCR)
- Composed of: 16 cities: Caloocan; Las Piñas; Makati; Malabon; Mandaluyong; Manila; Marikina; Muntinlupa; Navotas; Parañaque; Pasay; Pasig; Quezon City; San Juan; Taguig; Valenzuela; 1 municipality: Pateros

Government
  - Type: Metropolitan government under a decentralized framework
  - Body: Metropolitan Manila Development Authority
  - MMDA Chairman: Romando Artes
  - Metro Manila Council President: Francis Zamora

Area
  - Region: 636.00 km^{2} (245.56 sq mi)
  - Metro: 7,967.95 km^{2} (3,076.44 sq mi)

Population (2024 census)
  - Region: 14,001,751
  - Rank: 2nd region in the Philippines; 10th in Asia
  - Density: 22,015.3/km^{2} (57,019/sq mi)
  - Metro: 26,700,000
- Demonym(s): English: Manilan, Manileño; Spanish: manilense, (Note: This is the original Spanish, even used by José Rizal in El filibusterismo.) manileño(-a); Filipino: Manileño(-a), Manilenyo(-a), taga-Maynila

Economy
  - Poverty incidence: 0.6% (2025)
  - GDP total: US$152.250 billion (2025)
  - GDP per capita: US$10,984 (2025)
  - HDI (2023): 0.755 high · 1st of 17
- Time zone: UTC+8 (PST)
- PSGC: 130000000
- IDD : area code: +63 (0)2
- ISO 3166 code: PH-00
- Electorate: 7,563,520 voters (2025)
- Languages: Filipino (official and lingua franca based on Tagalog); Philippine English; others
- Website: mmda.gov.ph

Metropolitan Manila (Filipino: Kalakhang Maynila [kalakˌhaŋ maɪˈnilaʔ]), commonly shortened to Metro Manila (Note: Or more simply, albeit less precisely, Manila.) and formally the National Capital Region (NCR; Filipino: Pambansang Punong Rehiyon), is the capital region and largest metropolitan area of the Philippines. It encompasses an area of 636.00 km^{2} (245.56 sq mi) and the region has a population of 14,001,751 as of 2024, making it the second most populous region in the country after Calabarzon. Metro Manila is the 7th most populous metropolitan area in Asia and the 8th most populous urban area in the world. With Manila Bay to its west and the Laguna de Bay to its east, Metro Manila lies between the Central Luzon and Calabarzon regions. Metro Manila is made up of sixteen highly urbanized cities: Manila—the capital city—Caloocan, Las Piñas, Makati, Malabon, Mandaluyong, Marikina, Muntinlupa, Navotas, Parañaque, Pasay, Pasig, Quezon City, San Juan, Taguig, and Valenzuela, along with one independent municipality, Pateros.

Metro Manila is a global center of finance and commerce, culture, technology, entertainment and media, academics, the arts and fashion, politics and governance, and international diplomacy. The region accounts for 36% of the gross domestic product (GDP) of the Philippines. Greater Manila, the contiguous urbanized region surrounding the metropolis, is the fourth largest ASEAN country subdivision by GDP, after Singapore, and the Jakarta, and Bangkok metropolitan regions.

In 1975, in response to the need to sustain and provide integrated services to the growing population, the built-up area centered on Manila was formally recognized as a metropolitan area through Presidential Decree No. 824. A year later, Presidential Decree No. 879 established Metro Manila as an administrative region, retaining its earlier status as a metropolis, and designated it as Region IV, with the remainder of the Southern Tagalog region being designated as Region IV-A. Finally, in 1978, Metro Manila became the National Capital Region (NCR) of the Philippines, discontinuing its numerical designation and reverting Southern Tagalog to its original designation.

Metro Manila, as the center for international diplomacy of the Philippines, is where all of the embassies of other countries are located. It hosted the 1987, 2017, and 2026 ASEAN summits. It is also home to the Asian Development Bank and the World Health Organization Western Pacific Regional Office.

== Etymology ==
The name Manila is derived from the Filipino term Maynilà, which is commonly interpreted as either "where indigo plants are abundant" (may-nilà) or "where nilad plants are abundant" (may-nilad).

The term nilà is believed to originate from the Sanskrit word nīla (नील), meaning "indigo," and by extension referring to various plants used in producing natural indigo dye. It is thought that the name Maynilà was given due to the presence of such dye-producing plants in the area surrounding the early settlement, rather than because of an established trade in indigo. Notably, indigo dye production only became economically significant in the region during the 18th century, several centuries after the settlement had already been established and named.

Over time, Maynilà underwent Hispanicization during the Spanish colonial period, eventually adopting the name Manila.

=== May-nilà ===
Nilà is derived from the Sanskrit word nīla (नील), which refers to indigo dye and, by extension, to several plant species from which this natural dye can be extracted. The name Maynilà was probably bestowed because of the indigo-yielding plants that grew in the area surrounding the settlement rather than because it was known as a settlement that traded in indigo dye. Indigo dye extraction only became an important economic activity in the area in the 18th century, several hundred years after Maynila settlement was founded and named. Maynilà eventually underwent a process of Hispanicization and adopted the Spanish name Manila.

=== May-nilad ===
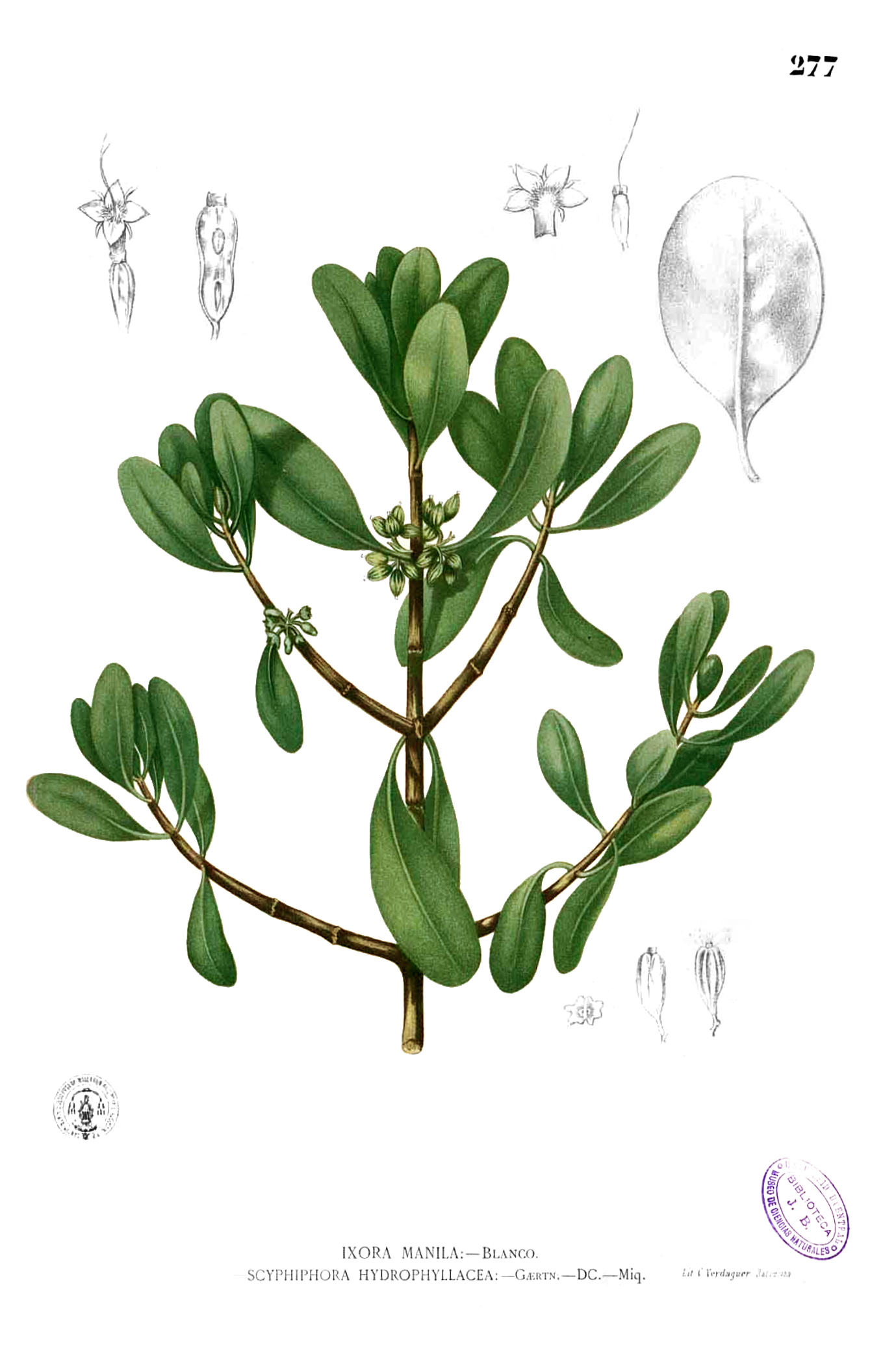
Plate depicting the "nilad" plant (Scyphiphora hydrophylacea), from Augustinian missionary Fray Francisco Manuel Blanco's botanical reference, Flora de Filipinas

This etymology arose from the observation that, in Tagalog, nilad or nilar refers to a shrub-like tree (Scyphiphora hydrophyllacea; formerly Ixora manila Blanco) that grows in or near mangrove swamps. However, Baumgartner explained that it is unlikely that native Tagalog speakers would completely drop the final consonant /d/ in nilad to arrive at the present form Maynilà. As an example, nearby Bacoor retains the final consonant of the old Tagalog word bakoód ("elevated piece of land"), even in old Spanish renderings of the placename (e.g., Vacol, Bacor). Linguist Vic Romero contends that it is actually not impossible for final consonant /d/ to shift into a glottal stop such as in mapalad to pinagpalà and hangád to hangà.

The earliest known reference to this etymology was in the third volume of John Ray's Historia Plantarum in 1704, originally lifted from the Herbarium aliarumque Stirpium in Insula Luzone Philippinarum primaria nascentium... by Fr. Georg Josef Kamel, and he mentioned that:

Nilad arbor mediocris, rarissimi recta, ligno folido, et compacto ut Molavin, ubi abundant Mangle, locum vocant Manglar, ita ubi nilad, Maynilad, unde corrupte Manila (Nilad is an average tree, very rare straight, leafy wood, and compact like Molavin, where Mangle abounds, the place is called Manglar, so where nilad (abounds), Maynilad, whence the corruption Manila).

Examples of popular adoption of this etymology include the name of a local utility company, Maynilad Water Services, and the name of an underpass close to Manila City Hall, the Lagusnilad (meaning "Nilad Pass").

== History ==
=== Kingdom of Maynila ===
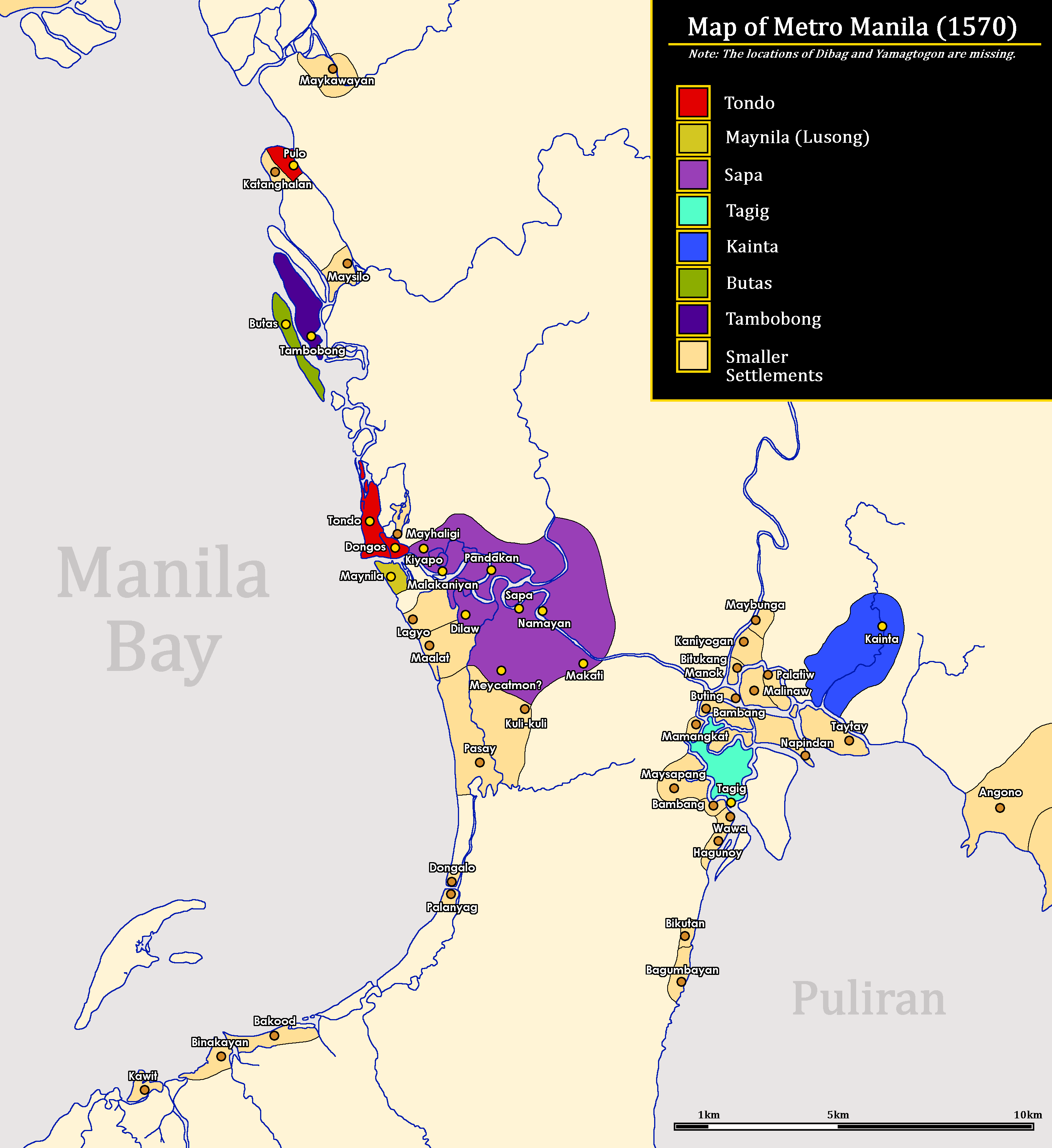
Map of ancient Manila in 1570. The polity of Maynila shown in yellow.

Manila, to the extent that it has this placename, was likely founded in the Middle Ages, in the early 16th century due to the Sanskrit origin of the component "nila" in its name which refers to "indigo", and the prevalence of the placename during the rule of Rajah Matanda, the old king of Maynila, who was born somewhere between the late 15th century to the early 16th century. The earliest evidence of Hinduism and Sanskrit influence in Maritime Southeast Asia is in Sanskrit inscriptions from the late 300s in eastern Kalimantan (Borneo). This analysis of the placename is supported by many other nearby placenames in the Tagalog region with the prefix "may-".

Manila has historically been a global city due to its role in international trade. During the 15th and 16th centuries, Manila was a walled and fortified city and was capital of the Kingdom of Luzon. Its institution, government, and economy were associated with the Tagalogs and the Kapampangans, and the Malay language was extensively used for foreign affairs as customary in much of Southeast Asia at the time. It was also well known in other Southeast Asian kingdoms such as Cebu, Brunei, Melaka, other Malay kingdoms, and Ternate, and its existence as a center of trade was widely known in East Asia as far as China and Japan.

In the current territory of Metropolitan Manila, there were several lordships that were either sovereign or tributary such as Tondo (Tundun), Navotas (Nabútas), Tambobong (Tambúbong), Taguig (Tagiig), Parañaque (Palanyág) and Cainta (Kaintâ).

Shortly after Rajah Matanda's birth, sometime around the early 16th century while he was rajahmuda or heir apparent, his father, the King of Luzon, died, leaving his mother as the queen regent of Luzon. By 1511, Luzonians had been carrying out large-scale trade at least within maritime Southeast Asia with Luzonians being hired as officials in Melaka and merchants gaining royal favors in Brunei. It was in Melaka that Luzonians met the Portuguese before their eventual conquest of Melaka in 1511. Rajah Matanda, in 1521, was known in Maritime Southeast Asia as the son of the King of Luzon. He married a princess of Brunei and served as an admiral for his grandfather, the Sultan of Brunei, in an attack near Java in exchange for soldiers and a fleet of ships. On the way home, he met and had an encounter with a Castilian fleet.

Some Luzonians in the 1500s had also been taking part in mercenary work in other kingdoms. The Luzonians' commercial influence also reached as far as Butuan. By the 1570s, the ruling class of Manila together with the international Luzonian merchants were Muslim and Islam was spreading through the freemen and the slaves.

=== Spanish rule ===
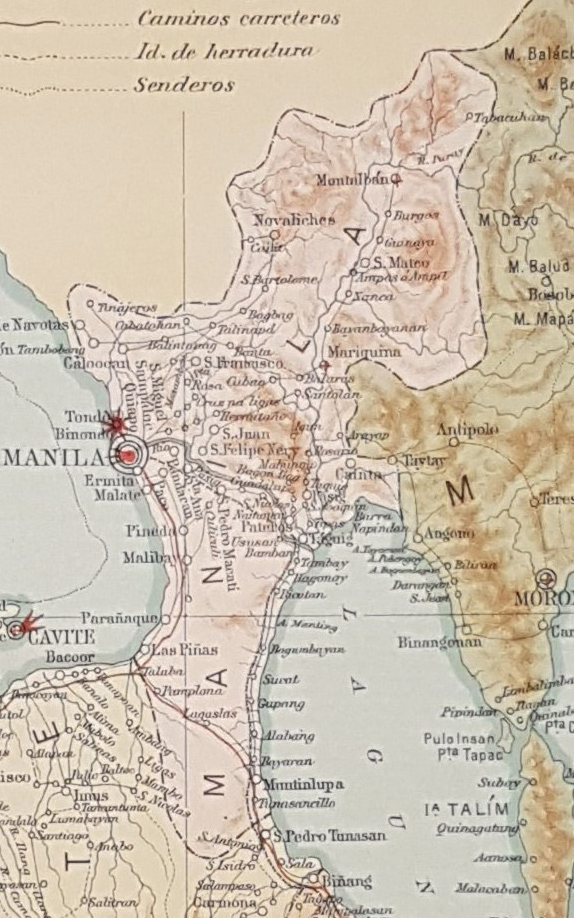
A map of the province of Manila during Spanish rule

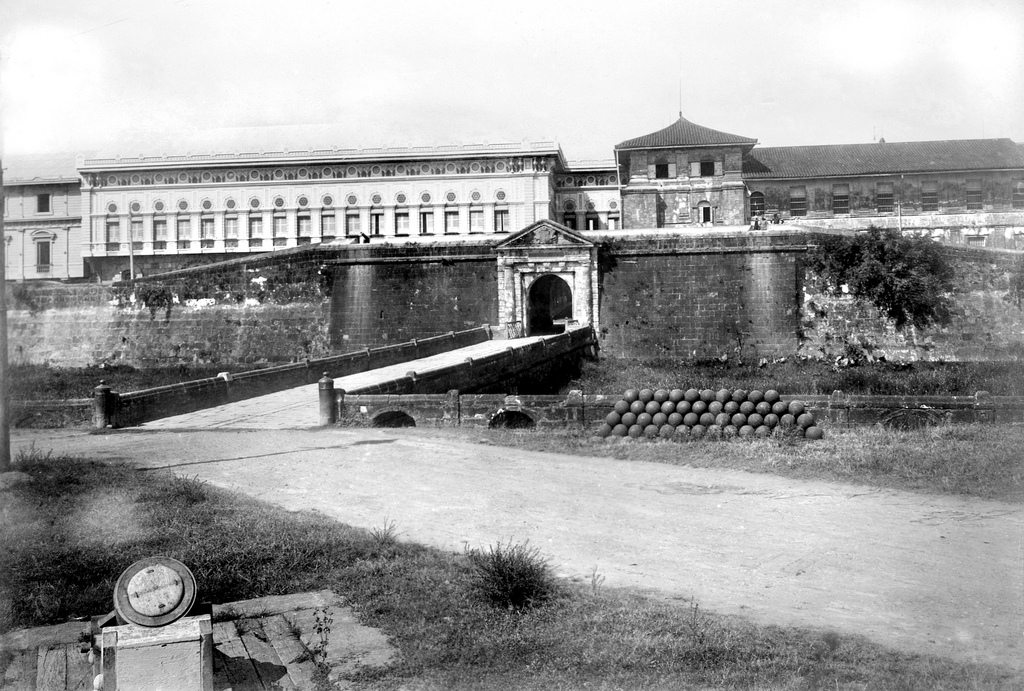
Puerta de Santa Lucía in 1873.

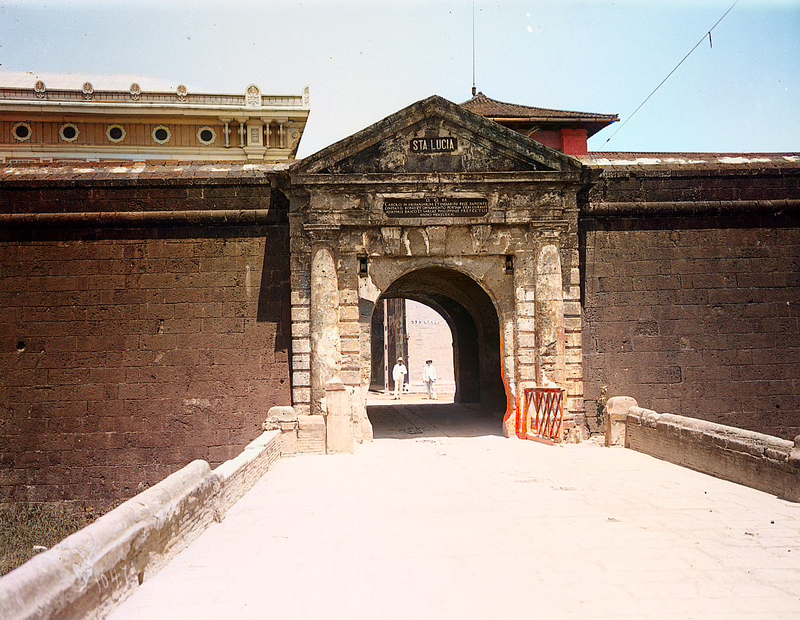
Santa Lucia gate entrance to the original walled city of Manila. (Intramuros)

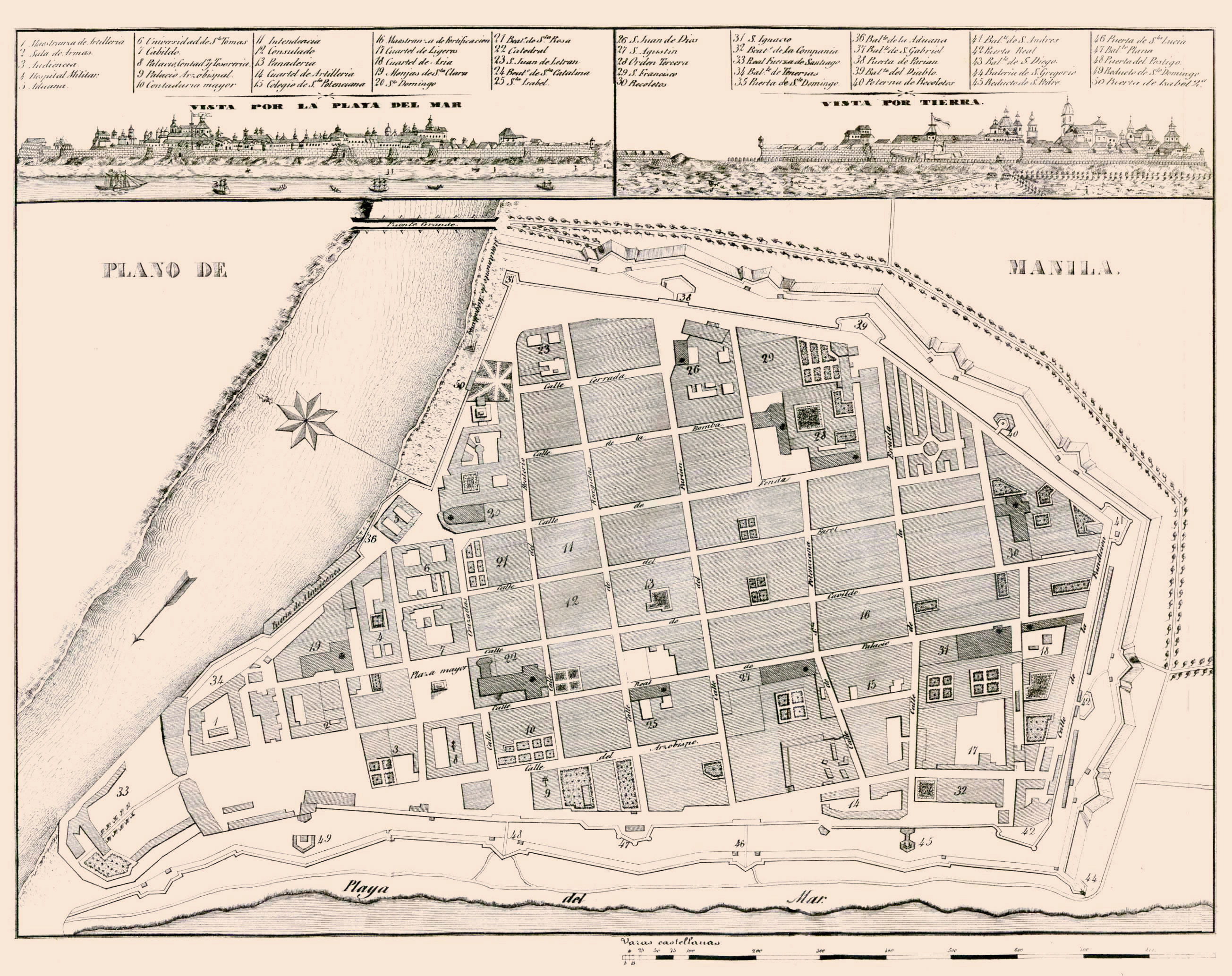
An 1851 map of Intramuros

On May 24, 1570, the Battle of Manila was fought between the Kingdom of Luzon, under the command of the heir apparent Prince Sulayman, and the Crown of Castile, under the command of field marshal Martín de Goiti who was aided by some foreign forces. Manila was burned and destroyed in the battle, and afterwards the Spanish set up a settlement to secure the territory on the same site for the Spanish ruler. Initially enclosed in wood, much later in stone, a new walled city of Manila became the capital of the Spanish East Indies.

After Manila was conquered by the Spaniards, the settlements of Maynila, Namayan and Tondo were consolidated to form the province of Manila. Miguel López de Legazpi declared the area of Manila as the new capital of the Spanish colony on June 24, 1571, because of its strategic location and rich resources. He also proclaimed the sovereignty of the Monarchy of Spain over the whole archipelago. King Philip II of Spain delighted at the new conquest achieved by Legazpi and his men, awarding the city a coat of arms and declaring it as: Ciudad Insigne y Siempre Leal (English: "Distinguished and Ever Loyal City"). It was settled and became the political, military, and religious center of the Spanish Empire in Asia.

The city was in constant danger of natural and man-made disasters and worse, attacks from foreign invaders. In 1574, a fleet of Chinese pirates led by Limahong attacked the city and destroyed it before the Spaniards drove them away. The colony had to be rebuilt again by the survivors. These attacks prompted the construction of the wall. Outside the Walled city of Manila has become the city's suburbs known as Extramuros (Outside the wall) made up of several pueblos, altogether making up the province known as Tondo which was established in January 1571 and would later on, be renamed as the province of Manila in 1859 with the city of Manila (Intramuros) as its capital.

In the short-lived First Philippine Republic, the province included the walled city of Manila and 23 other municipalities. Mariquina also served as the provincial capital of Manila from 1898 to 1899. However, despite almost the entirety of the territory being occupied by Philippine forces, the walled city of Manila remained under Spanish control.

=== American rule and early 20th century ===
After the 1898 Battle of Manila, Spain ceded the city of Manila with the islands to the United States. The First Philippine Republic based in nearby Bulacan fought against the Americans for control of the city. The Americans defeated the First Philippine Republic and captured President Emilio Aguinaldo, who subsequently pledged allegiance to the U.S. on April 1, 1901.

In drafting a new charter for Manila in June 1901, the U.S. officially recognised the city of Manila as comprising Intramuros and its surrounding arrabales (neighbourhoods). The new charter defined Manila as comprising eleven municipal districts merged into one city: Intramuros, Binondo, Ermita, Malate, Paco, Pandacan, Sampaloc, San Miguel, Santa Ana, Santa Cruz, and Tondo. Five parishes of the Catholic Church were also recognized as part of Manila: Gagalangin, Trozo, Balic-Balic, Santa Mesa, and Singalong; Balut and San Andrés were later added as parts of the city.

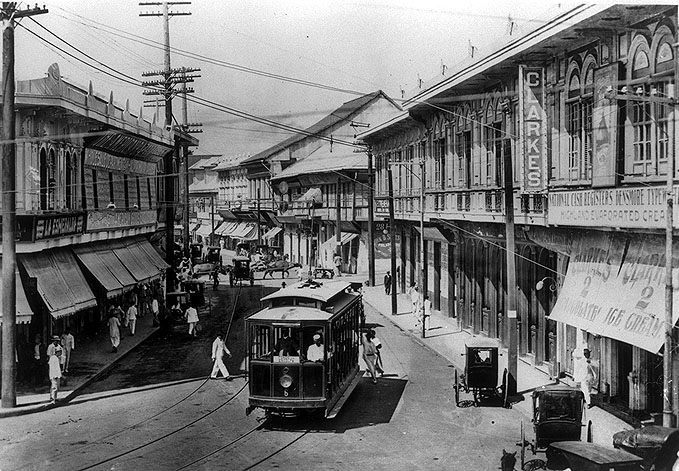
Tranvía was the extensive streetcar system in Manila and nearby towns.

Under U.S. control, a new, civilian-oriented Insular Government headed by Governor-General William Howard Taft invited city planner Daniel Burnham (founder of the "City Beautiful Movement") to adapt Manila to modern needs. The 1905 Burnham Plan of Manila recommended improving the city's transit systems by creating diagonal arteries radiating from the new central civic district into areas at the outskirts of the city. It included the development of a road system, the use of waterways for transportation, and the beautification of Manila with waterfront improvements and construction of parks, parkways, and buildings. The planned buildings included a government center occupying all of Wallace Field, which extends from Rizal Park to Taft Avenue. The Philippine capitol was to rise at the Taft Avenue end of the field, facing the sea. Along with buildings for government bureaus and departments, it would form a quadrangle with a central lagoon and the monument to José Rizal at the seaward end of the field. Of Burnham's proposed government centers in Luneta, only three units—the Legislative Building, and the buildings of the Finance and Agricultural Departments—were completed before World War II.

The province of Manila was dissolved by the U.S. government and most of it was incorporated into the newly created province of Rizal on June 11, 1901. The towns of Caloocan, Las Piñas, Mariquina, Pasig, Parañaque, Malabon, Navotas, San Juan del Monte, San Pedro de Macati, San Felipe Neri (now Mandaluyong), Muntinlupa, and the united towns of Taguig-Pateros were assigned to Rizal, with Pasig as the provincial capital. Meanwhile, the town of Polo (now Valenzuela) remained in Bulacan.

In the 1930s, Manila's urban problems were apparent and problematic. It lacked public housing, where thousands of the city's residents lived in congested informal settler communities, especially in the central districts of Binondo, Intramuros, Quiapo, San Nicolas and Tondo. There were also problems with sanitation and traffic congestion. The rise of slums in Manila gave rise to the development of its suburbs outside the city limits in the municipalities of Pasay, San Felipe Neri, San Francisco del Monte, Makati, and San Juan del Monte. These towns became favorable to the upper and middle-class who wanted to escape the congested city but had economic links to it.

President Manuel L. Quezon, aware of the problems besetting Manila, initiated housing projects called Barrio Obrero (Worker's Community). These communities were established in various places in Manila such as Avenida Rizal, Santa Cruz and Barrio Vitas, Tondo. However, the project failed miserably and these communities became slum areas. In order to decongest and replace Manila, a new capital city was planned on the hills on the outskirts of city, and its masterplan was approved by the Philippine government in 1941.

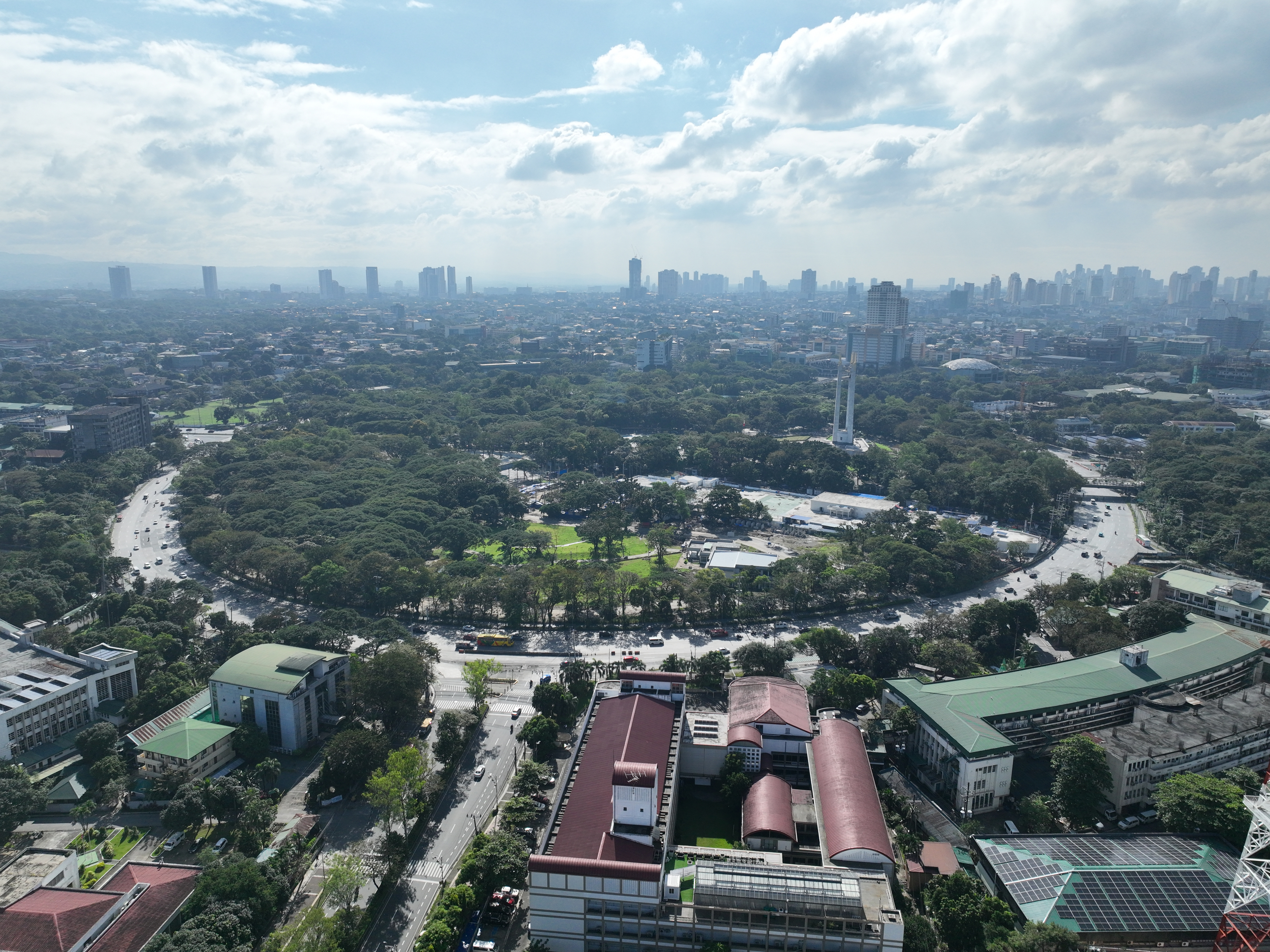
The Quezon Memorial Circle was originally intended as the government center housing the legislative, executive, and judicial branches of the government. Plans were shelved at the outbreak of World War II.

On October 12, 1939, Commonwealth Act No. 502 was passed by the National Assembly, which created Quezon City, the new national capital that is set to replace Manila. The following barrios or sitios: Balingasa, Balintawak, Galas, Kaingin, Kangkong, La Loma, Malamig, Masambong, Matalahib, San Isidro, San José, Santol, and Tatalon from Caloocan; Cubao, the western half of Diliman, Kamuning, New Manila, Roxas, and San Francisco del Monte from San Juan; Balara, Barangka, the eastern half of Diliman, Jesús de la Peña and Krus na Ligas from Marikina; Libis, Santolan and Ugong Norte from Pasig, Greenhills and the nearby areas surrounding Wack Wack Golf and Country Club from Mandaluyong, and some barrios of Montalban and San Mateo were to be given to the new capital city. Instead of opposing the move, the seven towns willingly gave land to Quezon City in the belief it would benefit the country.

The city was originally to be known as Balintawak City according to the first bill filed by Assemblyman Ramon P. Mitra from Mountain Province, but Assemblymen Narciso Ramos and Eugenio Pérez, both from Pangasinan, amended and successfully lobbied the assembly to name the city after the President in honor of his role in its creation. The establishment of Quezon City in turn stopped full implementation of the Burnham Plan of Manila, and the funds were diverted to building the new capital.

==== Japanese occupation ====
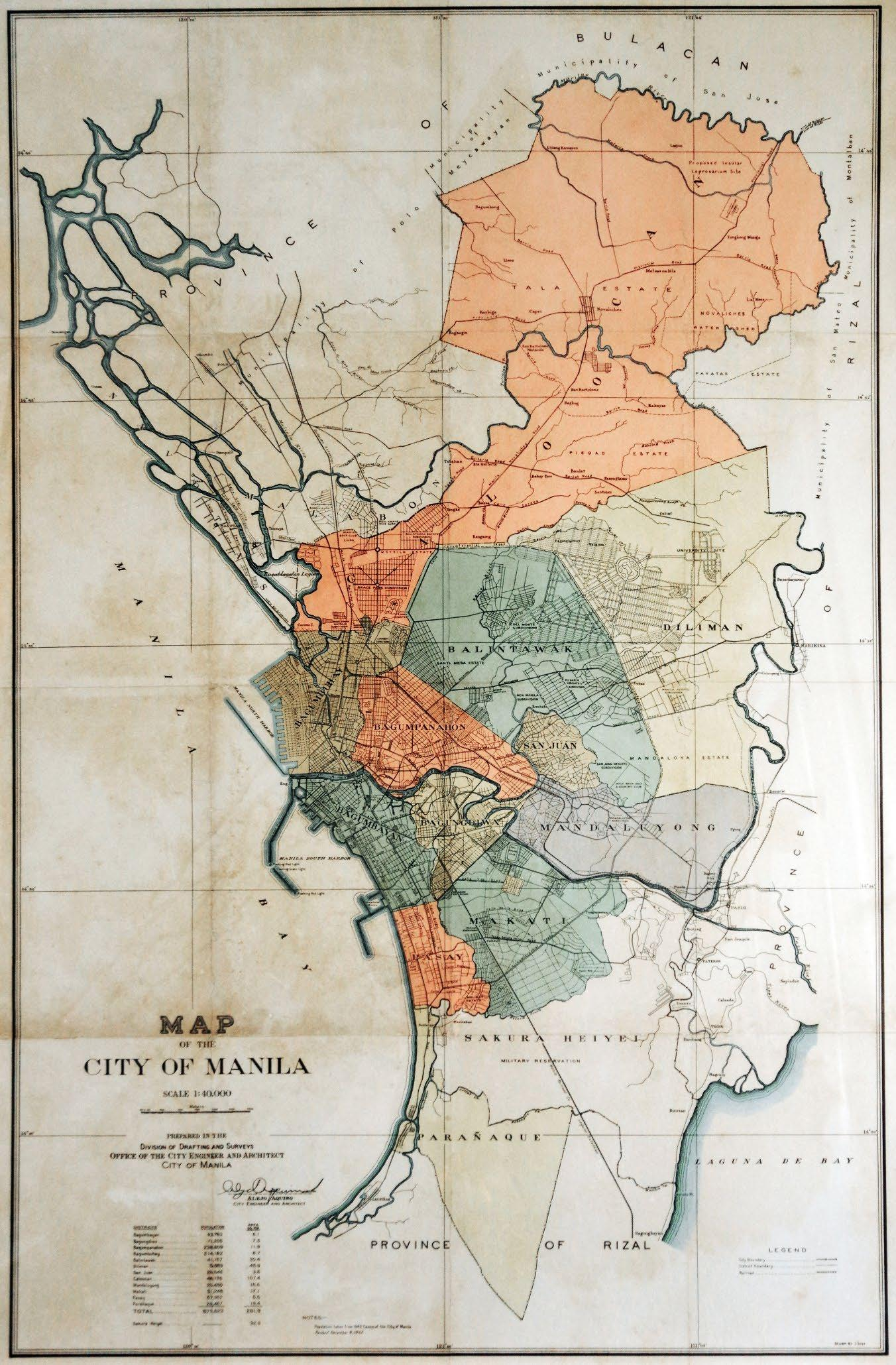
Map of the City of Greater Manila that existed from 1942 to 1945

In 1942, during the World War II, President Manuel L. Quezon created the City of Greater Manila as an emergency measure, merging the cities of Manila and Quezon City, along with the municipalities of Caloocan, Makati, Mandaluyong, Parañaque, Pasay, and San Juan. Furthermore, Manila was divided into the districts of Bagumbuhay, Bagumpanahon, Bagumbayan, and Bagungdiwa, while Quezon City was divided into the districts of Diliman and Balintawak. Jorge B. Vargas was appointed as its first mayor. Mayors in the municipalities and heads in the city districts included in the City of Greater Manila served as district chiefs. This was to ensure that Vargas, who was Quezon's principal lieutenant for administrative matters, would have a position of authority recognized under international military law. The City of Greater Manila served as a model for modern Metro Manila, and the administrative functions of the Governor of Metro Manila that was established under Marcos rule.

After World War II, in 1945, President Sergio Osmeña signed Executive Order No. 58, which dissolved the city of Greater Manila instituted by former President Quezon.

=== Late 20th and early 21st centuries ===
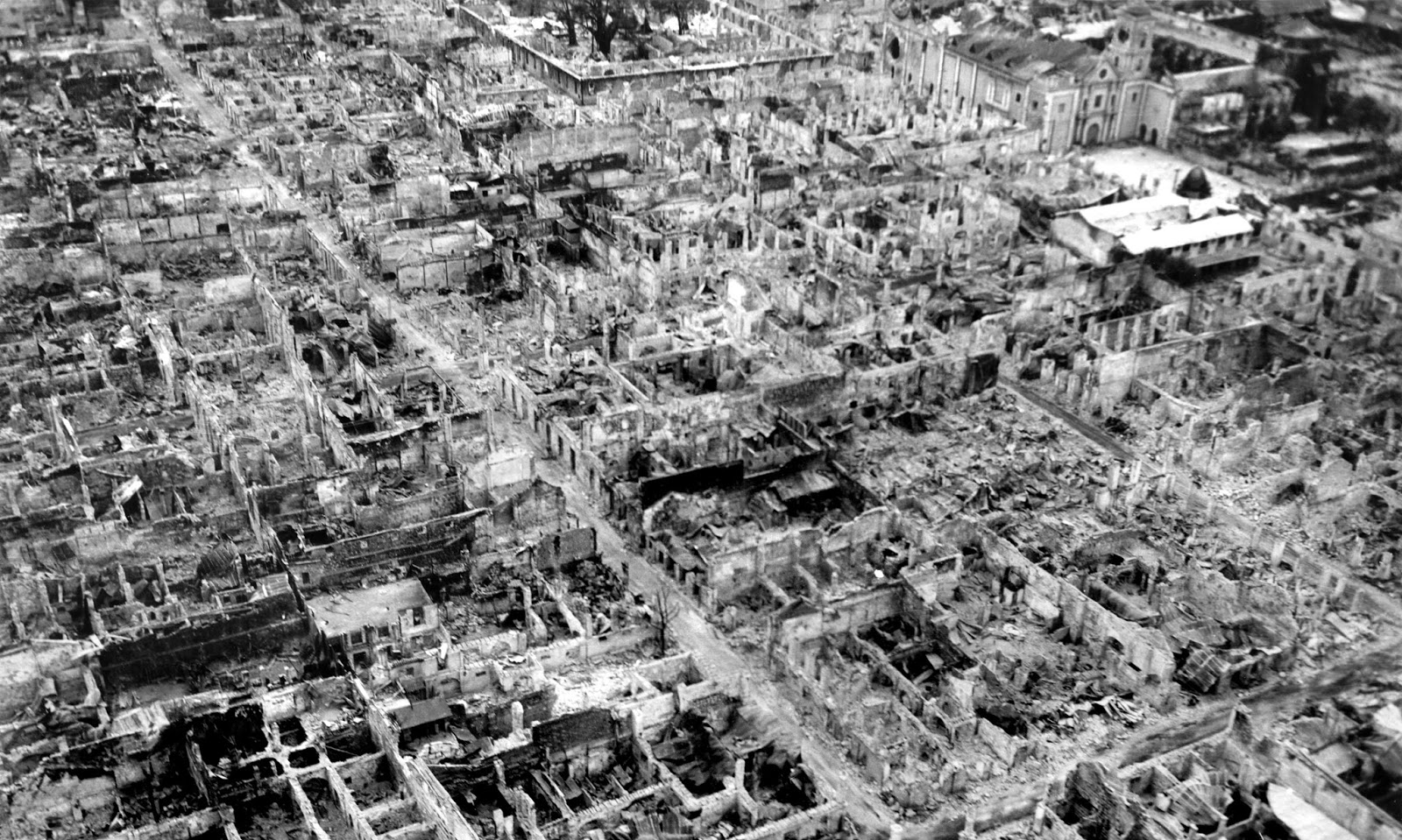
Destruction of the Walled City of Intramuros, Manila, in the aftermath of the Battle of Manila in 1945

The Coconut Palace was built as part of the City of Man

EDSA Shrine was one of the two monuments built to commemorate the People Power Revolution, the other being the People Power Monument in Camp Aguinaldo

World War II resulted in the loss of more than 100,000 lives in the battle of Manila in 1945. Most of the developments in Burnham's design were also destroyed. Later on, Quezon City was eventually declared as the national capital in 1948 and its territory was expanded to include the areas formerly under the jurisdiction of Caloocan, Marikina, and San Mateo, Rizal.

On February 27, 1975, a referendum was held wherein residents of Greater Manila approved granting President Ferdinand Marcos the authority to restructure the local governments into an integrated system like a manager-commission for under such terms and conditions as he may decide. On November 7, 1975, Metro Manila was formally established through Presidential Decree No. 824. The Metropolitan Manila Commission was also created to manage the region. On June 2, 1978, through Presidential Decree No. 1396, the metropolitan area was declared the National Capital Region of the Philippines. When Metro Manila was established, there were four cities, Manila, Quezon City, Caloocan, Pasay and the thirteen municipalities of Las Piñas, Makati, Malabon, Mandaluyong, Marikina, Muntinlupa, Navotas, Parañaque, Pasig, Pateros, San Juan, Taguig, and Valenzuela.

President Marcos appointed his wife, First Lady Imelda Marcos, as the first governor of Metro Manila in 1975, with her holding the position until 1986. As governor, she launched the City of Man campaign, with the Cultural Center of the Philippines Complex, Metropolitan Folk Arts Theater, Philippine International Convention Center, Coconut Palace and healthcare facilities such as the Lung Center of the Philippines, Philippine Heart Center, and the Kidney Center of the Philippines all being constructed precisely for this purpose. Most of these buildings are built in Brutalist style while incorporating tropical elements and Filipino motifs. The Marcos regime also re-designated Manila as the capital of the Philippines in 1976 through Presidential Decree No. 940. The decree states that Manila has always been, to the Filipino people and in the eyes of the world, the premier city of the Philippines, being the center of trade, commerce, education, and culture. While the then-newly formed region was designated as the seat of government.

On July 12, 1980, President Ferdinand Marcos created the Light Rail Transit Authority (LRTA) and assigned First Lady and Governor of Metro Manila Imelda Marcos as its chairman. In the late 1981, Manila started its construction of its first metro line, the LRT Line 1. In 1984, the southern section of the line along Taft Avenue was opened. The northern section up to Monumento was opened in 1985.

President Marcos was overthrown in a non-violent revolution along EDSA, which lasted four days in late February 1986. The popular uprising, now known as the People Power Revolution, made international headlines as "the revolution that surprised the world".

In 1986, President Corazon Aquino laid down the Executive Order No. 392, reorganizing and changing the structure of the Metropolitan Manila Commission and renamed it to the Metropolitan Manila Authority. Mayors in the metropolis chose from among themselves the chair of the agency. Another reorganization took place in 1995 by virtue of Republic Act No. 7924, creating the present-day Metropolitan Manila Development Authority. The chairperson of the agency would be appointed by the President and should not have a concurrent elected position such as mayor. Elfren Cruz was the last to serve as the officer-in-charge governor of Metro Manila. Throughout 1988, unemployment among the country's regions was highest in Metro Manila, with 20.1% of the region's workforce being jobless. The rate remained steady into 1991. By the year 2000, the unemployment rate in Metro Manila is at 20%.

In 1994, Mandaluyong became a highly urbanized city, and was followed by the municipalities of Makati, Muntinlupa, and Pasig, which finally became a highly urbanized city in 1995. In the same year, the construction of Metro Manila Skyway began, an elevated expressway that will link the north and south corridor of the metropolis. Mass transit projects also began construction in 1996, with the LRT Line 2 and MRT Line 3 commencing construction in that year. Marikina also became a highly urbanized city in 1996, followed by Las Piñas in 1997, and by Parañaque and Valenzuela in 1998.

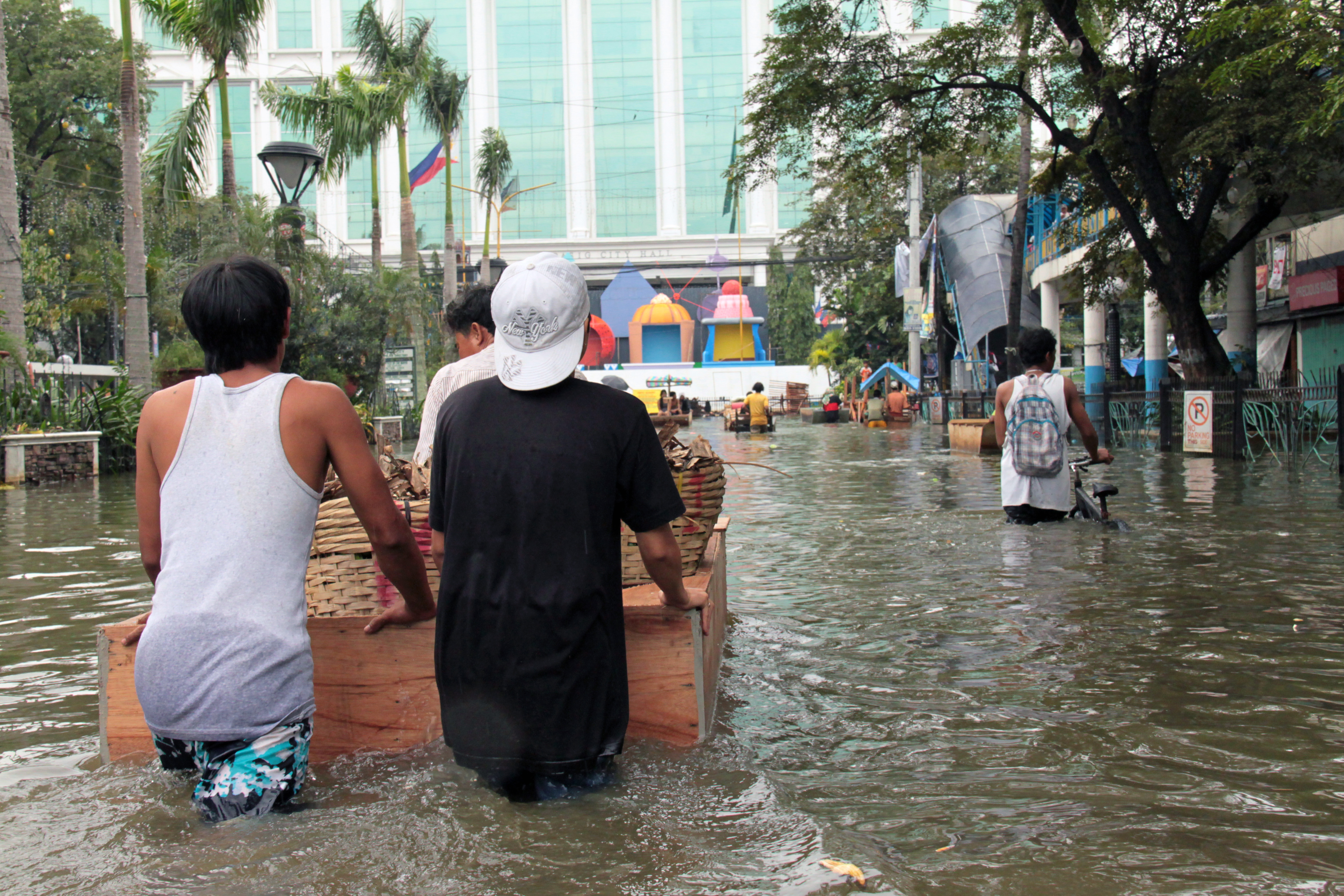
A flooded street facing Pasig City Hall in the aftermath of Typhoon Ketsana (Ondoy)

In the year 2000, a series of bombings occurred perpetuated by Islamic terrorists. MRT Line 3 was opened to the public in the same year, while LRT Line 2 opened in 2004. Malabon become a highly urbanized city in 2001, followed by Taguig in 2004, and finally by Navotas and San Juan in 2007. Only Pateros remains a municipality. In 2009, Typhoon Ketsana hit Metro Manila and surrounding provinces, causing widespread flooding that killed 448 people in region. A state of calamity was declared in the metropolis and surrounding provinces.

In 2014, the Metro Manila Dream Plan was formulated, an integrated plan which aims to address the region's problems in the areas of transportation, land use, and environment. In the same year, San Pedro, Laguna was proposed to be Metro Manila' 18th member city by MMDA's then-Chairman Francis Tolentino. Senator Aquilino "Koko" Pimentel III filed Senate Bill No. 3029, which seeks to create San Pedro as a separate legislative district to commence in the next national and local elections if the bill was passed into law.

The MRT Line 7 began construction in 2016, more than a decade after the metropolis completed its last metro line. A year later, in 2017, the south extension of LRT Line 1 commenced construction, and it opened to the public in 2024. It added 6 km (3.7 mi) of length to the total LRT Line 1 System. Meanwhile, LRT Line 2 was extended up to Antipolo, Rizal, which was completed in 2021. The Metro Manila Subway started its construction in 2019, connecting the cities of Valenzuela, Quezon City, Pasig, Taguig, Parañaque and Pasay. It is the most expensive railway project of the Philippines to date.

Decline in night light radiance across Metro Manila during the COVID-19 lockdown (March 1 – June 30, 2020)

In January 2020, Manila confirmed its first case of COVID-19, a 38-year-old Chinese woman from Wuhan, the origin of the disease, who travelled to the Philippines. Three days later, the second confirmed case was a 44-year-old male Chinese national, who was the companion of the first confirmed patient. Both patients received treatment at the San Lazaro Hospital with the latter being reported to have died from the disease on February 2, becoming the first known fatality outside China. After a month of no new cases in the country, the first case of someone without travel history abroad was confirmed on March 5, a 62-year-old male who frequented a Muslim prayer hall in San Juan, raising suspicions that a community transmission of COVID-19 is already underway. The man's wife was confirmed to have contracted COVID-19 on March 7, which was also the first local transmission to be confirmed. The pandemic necessitated lockdowns and strained the region's health infrastructure. By March 2023, much of the restrictions have been lifted, and by May of the same year, Metro Manila recorded a total of more than 1.3 million cases with 13,829 deaths from COVID-19-related complications.

Aerial view of Metro Manila showing its rapid urbanization

In April 2022, Makati lost the territorial dispute with Taguig regarding the Fort Bonifacio Military Reservation, which was ruled with finality a year later in April 2023. The entire military reservation which includes Bonifacio Global City, and the ten Enlisted Men's Barrios (EMBO) barangays, were declared as part of Taguig and were reintegrated to city in 2023. Further territorial changes occurred in 2024, when Las Piñas delineated the boundaries of its 20 barangays in order to settle the overlapping boundaries of its villages. In the same year, barangay Bagong Silang in Caloocan was split into 5 smaller barangays due to its sheer size and large population. In 2026, Parañaque altered the boundary of its 5 coastal barangays to conform to the straight line policy.

The widespread floods in the capital region in 2024 and 2026 highlighted the government corruption in flood control projects, which resulted in a series of protests against the Marcos Jr. administration.

== Geography ==
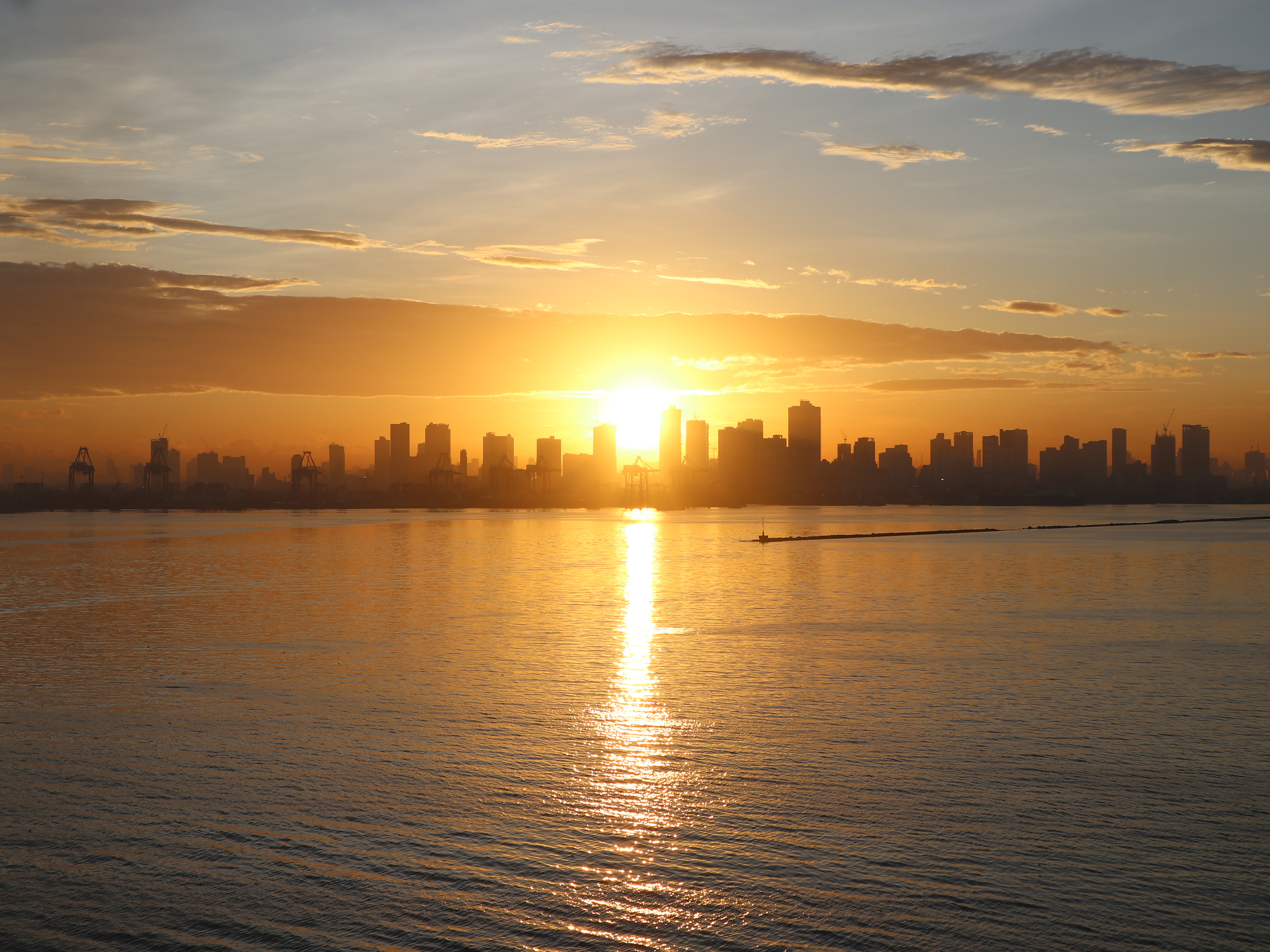
Sunrise as seen from the Manila North Harbor

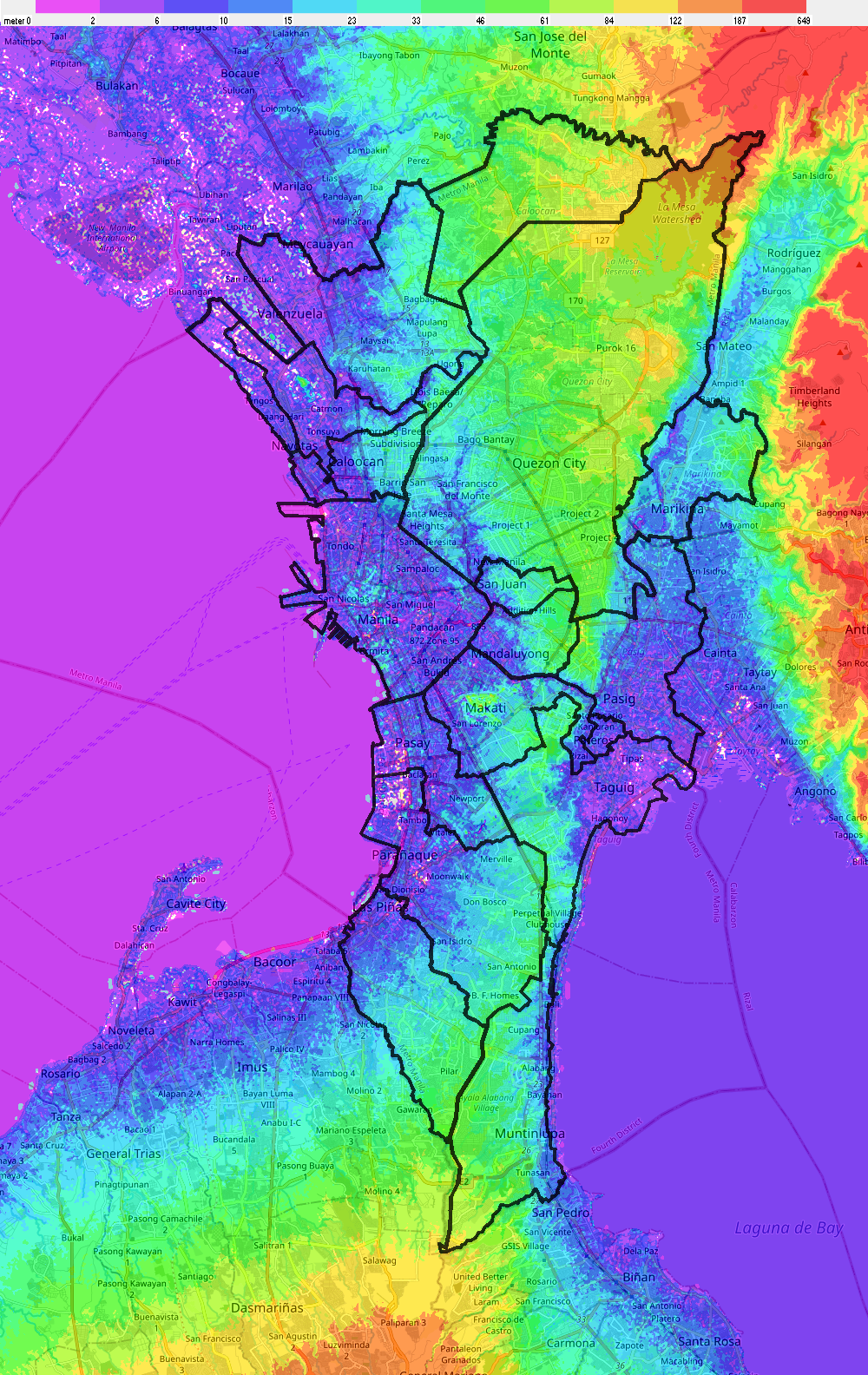
Metropolitan Manila, or the National Capital Region, is divided morphologically into three major parts. These are the: Central Plateau, Coastal Lowland, and Marikina Valley

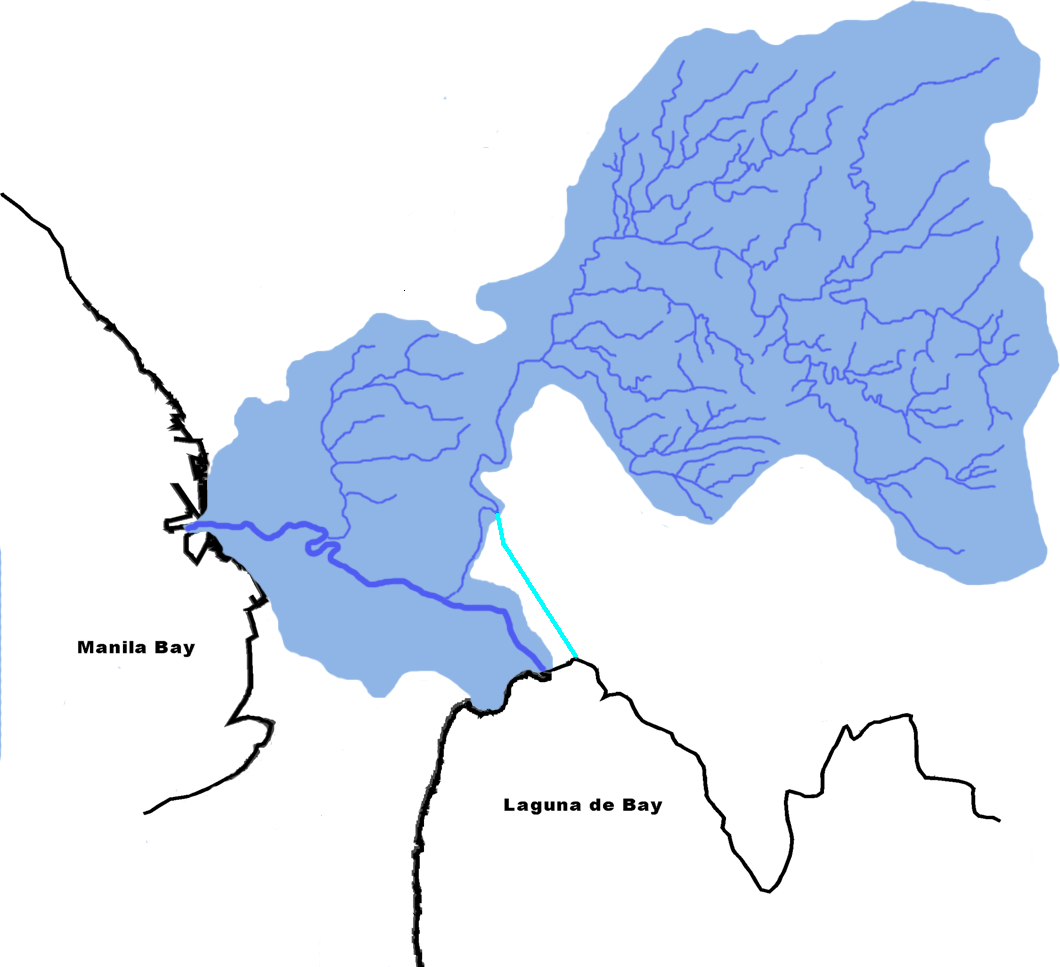
Drainage map of the Pasig-Marikina River system

Metro Manila is located in the southwestern portion of Luzon. The region lies along the flat alluvial lands extending from the mouth of the Pasig River in the west to the higher rugged lands of Marikina Valley in the east. The region is geographically divided into 4 zones: the Coastal Margin, Guadalupe Plateau, Marikina Valley, and the Laguna Lowlands.

The Coastal Margin or Lowland is a flat and low plain that faces Manila Bay. Located here is Manila, Navotas, parts of Malabon, and the western part and reclaimed areas of Pasay and Parañaque, where the ground elevation ranges from zero meters on Manila Bay to five meters (16 ft) at the west side of the cities of Mandaluyong and Makati. The Coastal Lowland possesses resources for offshore fisheries and fishpond development, and various reclamation projects in the area are meant for mixed-use urban development. The Central or Guadalupe Plateau is the most adaptable to urban development activities not only because of its solid geographical foundations but also because of its existing infrastructure links with the rest of Luzon. It is mainly residential and includes the densely populated areas of Metro Manila such San Juan, Makati and Quezon City, as well as most parts of Caloocan and Mandaluyong. The ground elevation ranges from 20 to 40 meters (66 to 131 ft) and gradually becomes lower towards its western side, while ground elevation ranges from 70 to 100 meters (230 to 330 ft) towards the northwestern side of the plateau. The area becomes narrower along the Pasig River. The Marikina Valley is a floodplain along the Marikina River and a delta along Laguna de Bay. Its elevation ranges from two meters (6 ft 7 in) on the Laguna de Bay side to 30 meters (98 ft) on its north side towards Montalban. It is surrounded by the Central Plateau and mountains of Rizal. It has fertile land suitable for crop cultivation while the Marikina River provides water for industrial uses and discharge. The Laguna Lowlands is not only suitable for agriculture and aquaculture but also for industrial activity.

Land reclamation projects have increased Metro Manila's land area. The agency responsible for the reclamation projects within Metro Manila and elsewhere in the country is the Philippine Reclamation Authority.

=== Climate ===
According to the Köppen climate classification, there are two climates in Metro Manila. Most of the region has a tropical wet and dry climate (Köppen climate classification Aw) while the northeastern part of the region that lies on the foothills of Sierra Madre has a tropical monsoon climate. Together with the rest of the Philippines, Manila lies entirely within the tropics. Its proximity to the equator means that temperatures are hot year-round, rarely going below 15 °C or above 39 °C. Temperature extremes have ranged from 14.4 °C on January 11, 1914, to 38.8 °C on April 27, 2024.

Humidity levels are usually very high all year round. Manila has a distinct dry season from December through April, and a relatively lengthy wet season that covers the remaining period with slightly cooler temperatures. In the wet season, it rarely rains all day, but rainfall is very heavy during short periods. Typhoons usually occur from June to September.

Climate data for Port Area, Manila (1981–2010, extremes 1885–2023)
| Month | Jan | Feb | Mar | Apr | May | Jun | Jul | Aug | Sep | Oct | Nov | Dec | Year |
|---|---|---|---|---|---|---|---|---|---|---|---|---|---|
| Record high °C (°F) | 36.5 (97.7) | 35.6 (96.1) | 36.8 (98.2) | 38.0 (100.4) | 38.6 (101.5) | 37.6 (99.7) | 37.0 (98.6) | 35.6 (96.1) | 35.3 (95.5) | 35.8 (96.4) | 35.6 (96.1) | 34.6 (94.3) | 38.6 (101.5) |
| Mean daily maximum °C (°F) | 29.6 (85.3) | 30.6 (87.1) | 32.1 (89.8) | 33.5 (92.3) | 33.2 (91.8) | 32.2 (90.0) | 31.2 (88.2) | 30.8 (87.4) | 31.0 (87.8) | 31.1 (88.0) | 30.9 (87.6) | 29.8 (85.6) | 31.3 (88.3) |
| Daily mean °C (°F) | 26.7 (80.1) | 27.4 (81.3) | 28.7 (83.7) | 30.1 (86.2) | 30.0 (86.0) | 29.3 (84.7) | 28.5 (83.3) | 28.3 (82.9) | 28.4 (83.1) | 28.4 (83.1) | 28.0 (82.4) | 27.0 (80.6) | 28.4 (83.1) |
| Mean daily minimum °C (°F) | 23.8 (74.8) | 24.2 (75.6) | 25.3 (77.5) | 26.6 (79.9) | 26.9 (80.4) | 26.4 (79.5) | 25.9 (78.6) | 25.8 (78.4) | 25.7 (78.3) | 25.7 (78.3) | 25.1 (77.2) | 24.2 (75.6) | 25.5 (77.9) |
| Record low °C (°F) | 14.5 (58.1) | 15.6 (60.1) | 16.2 (61.2) | 17.2 (63.0) | 20.0 (68.0) | 20.1 (68.2) | 19.4 (66.9) | 18.0 (64.4) | 20.2 (68.4) | 19.5 (67.1) | 16.8 (62.2) | 15.7 (60.3) | 14.5 (58.1) |
| Average rainfall mm (inches) | 17.3 (0.68) | 14.2 (0.56) | 15.8 (0.62) | 23.7 (0.93) | 147.2 (5.80) | 253.5 (9.98) | 420.5 (16.56) | 432.4 (17.02) | 355.1 (13.98) | 234.8 (9.24) | 121.7 (4.79) | 67.4 (2.65) | 2,103.6 (82.82) |
| Average rainy days (≥ 0.1 mm) | 4 | 3 | 3 | 4 | 10 | 17 | 21 | 21 | 20 | 17 | 12 | 7 | 139 |
| Average relative humidity (%) | 72 | 69 | 67 | 66 | 71 | 76 | 79 | 81 | 80 | 78 | 75 | 74 | 74 |
| Mean monthly sunshine hours | 177 | 198 | 226 | 258 | 223 | 162 | 133 | 133 | 132 | 158 | 153 | 152 | 2,105 |
Source 1: PAGASA
Source 2: Danish Meteorological Institute (sun, 1931–1960)

Climate data for Pasay (Ninoy Aquino International Airport) 1981–2010, extremes 1947–2024
| Month | Jan | Feb | Mar | Apr | May | Jun | Jul | Aug | Sep | Oct | Nov | Dec | Year |
|---|---|---|---|---|---|---|---|---|---|---|---|---|---|
| Record high °C (°F) | 35.8 (96.4) | 35.1 (95.2) | 36.5 (97.7) | 38.8 (101.8) | 38.1 (100.6) | 38.0 (100.4) | 36.4 (97.5) | 35.2 (95.4) | 34.9 (94.8) | 36.0 (96.8) | 35.8 (96.4) | 34.2 (93.6) | 38.8 (101.8) |
| Mean daily maximum °C (°F) | 30.2 (86.4) | 30.0 (86.0) | 30.5 (86.9) | 31.1 (88.0) | 40.8 (105.4) | 35.5 (95.9) | 30.3 (86.5) | 30.8 (87.4) | 30.0 (86.0) | 30.1 (86.2) | 29.1 (84.4) | 28.2 (82.8) | 39.6 (103.3) |
| Daily mean °C (°F) | 26.1 (79.0) | 26.7 (80.1) | 28.0 (82.4) | 29.5 (85.1) | 29.7 (85.5) | 28.8 (83.8) | 28.0 (82.4) | 27.7 (81.9) | 27.8 (82.0) | 27.7 (81.9) | 27.4 (81.3) | 26.5 (79.7) | 27.8 (82.0) |
| Mean daily minimum °C (°F) | 19.0 (66.2) | 19.5 (67.1) | 19.6 (67.3) | 24.0 (75.2) | 24.5 (76.1) | 24.1 (75.4) | 22.6 (72.7) | 22.6 (72.7) | 22.6 (72.7) | 22.3 (72.1) | 21.7 (71.1) | 21.7 (71.1) | 22.0 (71.6) |
| Record low °C (°F) | 14.8 (58.6) | 14.6 (58.3) | 16.0 (60.8) | 18.7 (65.7) | 19.1 (66.4) | 20.0 (68.0) | 18.3 (64.9) | 17.4 (63.3) | 19.1 (66.4) | 18.0 (64.4) | 17.2 (63.0) | 16.3 (61.3) | 14.6 (58.3) |
| Average rainfall mm (inches) | 6.8 (0.27) | 4.2 (0.17) | 4.0 (0.16) | 16.0 (0.63) | 70.4 (2.77) | 265.2 (10.44) | 316.7 (12.47) | 418.4 (16.47) | 255.2 (10.05) | 283.4 (11.16) | 99.0 (3.90) | 28.6 (1.13) | 1,767.8 (69.60) |
| Average rainy days (≥ 0.1 mm) | 2 | 1 | 1 | 1 | 6 | 14 | 16 | 19 | 16 | 14 | 8 | 3 | 101 |
| Average relative humidity (%) | 75 | 72 | 68 | 67 | 72 | 77 | 81 | 83 | 83 | 80 | 78 | 76 | 76 |
Source: PAGASA

Climate data for Science Garden, Quezon City (1981–2010, extremes 1961–2024)
| Month | Jan | Feb | Mar | Apr | May | Jun | Jul | Aug | Sep | Oct | Nov | Dec | Year |
|---|---|---|---|---|---|---|---|---|---|---|---|---|---|
| Record high °C (°F) | 34.7 (94.5) | 35.6 (96.1) | 36.8 (98.2) | 38.2 (100.8) | 38.5 (101.3) | 38.0 (100.4) | 36.2 (97.2) | 35.8 (96.4) | 35.4 (95.7) | 35.4 (95.7) | 35.0 (95.0) | 34.7 (94.5) | 38.5 (101.3) |
| Mean daily maximum °C (°F) | 30.6 (87.1) | 31.7 (89.1) | 33.4 (92.1) | 35.0 (95.0) | 34.7 (94.5) | 33.1 (91.6) | 31.9 (89.4) | 31.3 (88.3) | 31.6 (88.9) | 31.6 (88.9) | 31.4 (88.5) | 30.5 (86.9) | 32.2 (90.0) |
| Daily mean °C (°F) | 25.7 (78.3) | 26.3 (79.3) | 27.8 (82.0) | 29.4 (84.9) | 29.7 (85.5) | 28.8 (83.8) | 28.0 (82.4) | 27.8 (82.0) | 27.8 (82.0) | 27.6 (81.7) | 27.1 (80.8) | 26.0 (78.8) | 27.7 (81.9) |
| Mean daily minimum °C (°F) | 20.8 (69.4) | 20.9 (69.6) | 22.1 (71.8) | 23.7 (74.7) | 24.7 (76.5) | 24.6 (76.3) | 24.1 (75.4) | 24.2 (75.6) | 24.0 (75.2) | 23.5 (74.3) | 22.7 (72.9) | 21.6 (70.9) | 23.1 (73.6) |
| Record low °C (°F) | 15.5 (59.9) | 15.1 (59.2) | 14.9 (58.8) | 17.2 (63.0) | 17.8 (64.0) | 18.1 (64.6) | 17.7 (63.9) | 17.8 (64.0) | 20.0 (68.0) | 18.6 (65.5) | 15.6 (60.1) | 15.1 (59.2) | 14.9 (58.8) |
| Average rainfall mm (inches) | 18.5 (0.73) | 14.6 (0.57) | 24.8 (0.98) | 40.4 (1.59) | 186.7 (7.35) | 316.5 (12.46) | 493.3 (19.42) | 504.2 (19.85) | 451.2 (17.76) | 296.6 (11.68) | 148.8 (5.86) | 78.7 (3.10) | 2,574.4 (101.35) |
| Average rainy days (≥ 0.1 mm) | 4 | 3 | 4 | 5 | 12 | 18 | 22 | 23 | 22 | 18 | 14 | 8 | 153 |
| Average relative humidity (%) | 76 | 73 | 69 | 67 | 72 | 79 | 83 | 84 | 84 | 83 | 82 | 79 | 78 |
Source: PAGASA

=== Natural hazards ===
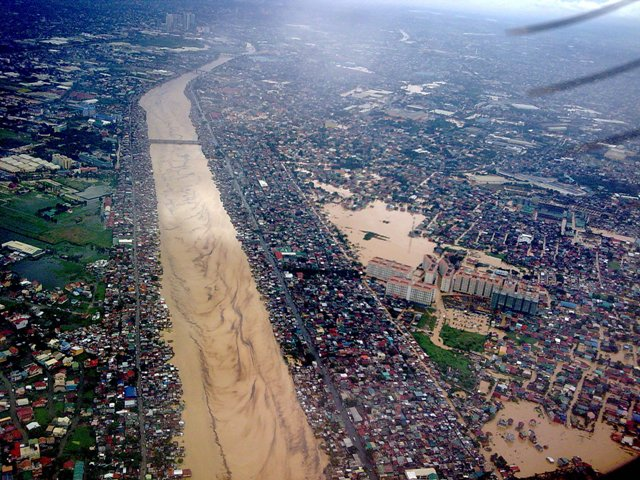
Flooding brought by Typhoon Ketsana (Tropical Storm Ondoy) in 2009 that killed 448 people in Metro Manila

Metro Manila is exposed to multiple natural hazards such as earthquakes, floods, and typhoons. It is surrounded by active faults including the Marikina Valley Fault System. Other distant faults such as the Philippine Faults, Lubang Faults, Manila Trench and Casiguran Faults, are a threat as well. Flooding is recurrent every year especially in low-lying areas of Valenzuela, Malabon, Caloocan, Navotas, Manila, Pasay, Parañaque, and Las Piñas, where flood are generally linked with the tidal movements in Manila Bay. Meanwhile, Marikina, Pasig, Taguig, and Pateros are areas inland that are also prone to flooding. These areas are located along the Marikina Valley where there is poor soil drainage and a shallow water table due to being in proximity to Laguna Bay's shores. Flood risks are generally lower in cities along the Guadalupe Plateau, including Quezon City, San Juan, Makati, Mandaluyong and Muntinlupa, where volcanic rocks rise up to 40 to 70 meters (130 to 230 ft) above sea level. Around five to seven typhoons hit Manila yearly. Manila was ranked as the second riskiest capital city after Tokyo to live in according to Swiss Re.

==== Earthquakes ====
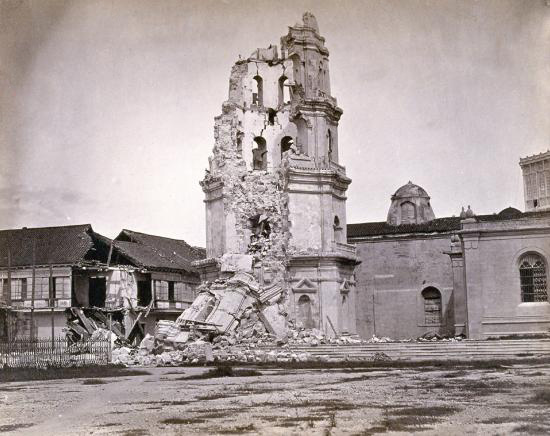
Destroyed belfry of the Manila Cathedral in the aftermath of the 1880 Southern Luzon earthquakes

The West Valley fault of the Marikina Valley fault system runs through the cities of Quezon City, Marikina, Pasig, Taguig and Muntinlupa. The fault poses a threat of a large-scale earthquake with an estimated magnitude between 6–7 and as high as 7.6 to Metro Manila and surrounding provinces, with a death toll predicted to be as high as 35,000 and some 120,000 or higher injured and more than three million needed to be evacuated.

==== Typhoons and floods ====
Metro Manila is a low-lying basin, a natural collection point for water. Rains from the surrounding Sierra Madre mountain range and the overflow from Laguna de Bay flow into the metropolis, particularly via the Pasig and Marikina rivers. Rapid urban growth also led to the loss of natural drainage, and there are clogged waterways due to improper waste disposal.

==== Volcanic eruptions ====
There are two active volcanoes that are located less than 100 km (62 mi) from Manila. These are the Taal Volcano, located 50 kilometers (31 mi) south of the metrpolis and the second most active volcano in the Philippines, and Mount Pinatubo which is located 87 kilometers (54 mi) northwest of Manila. During the 2020–2022 Taal Volcano eruptions, Metro Manila experienced ashfalls.

=== Parks ===
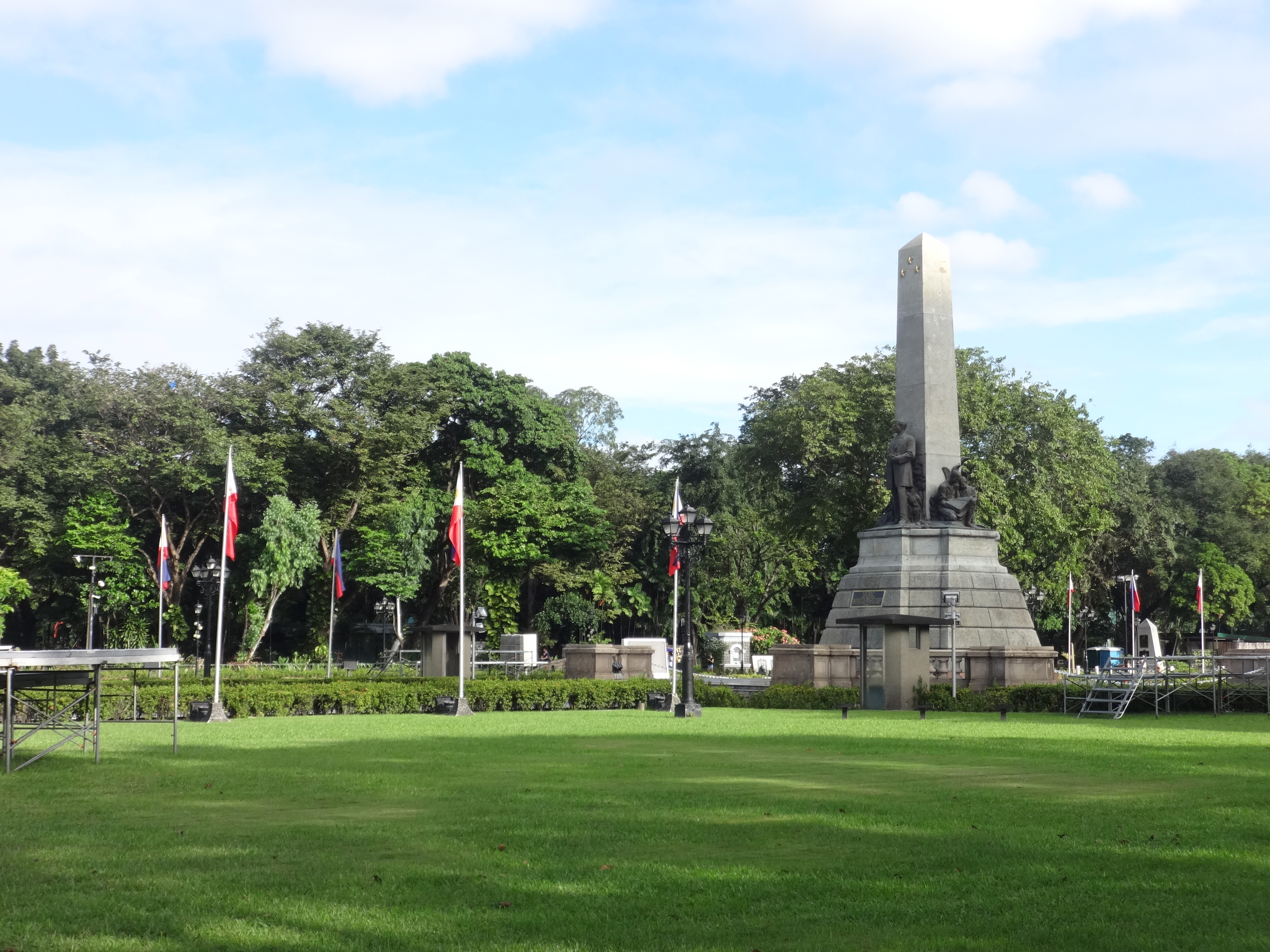
Rizal Park in Manila.

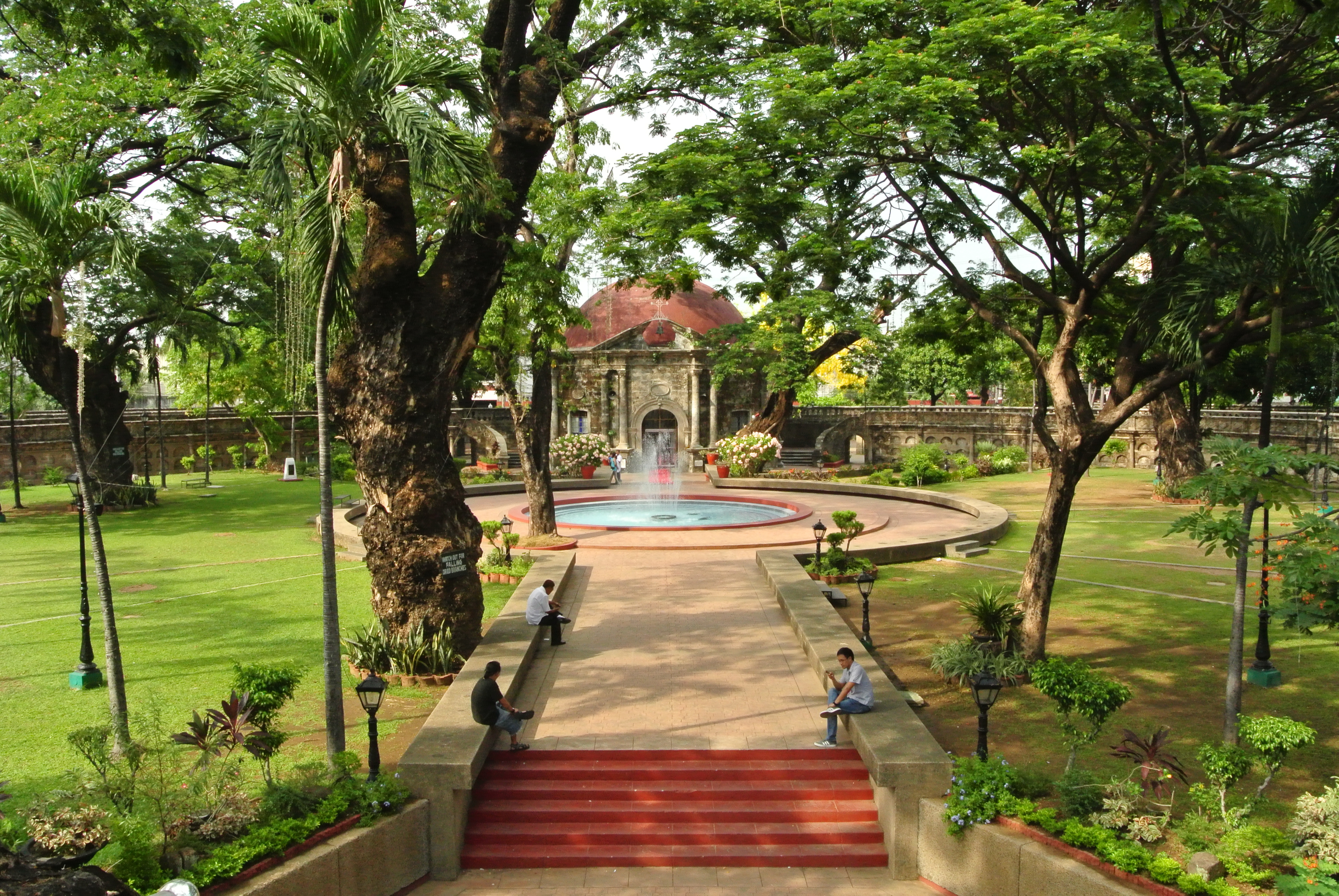
Paco Park is a former municipal cemetery built by the Dominicans during the Spanish colonial times

Quezon Memorial Shrine at the Quezon Memorial Circle

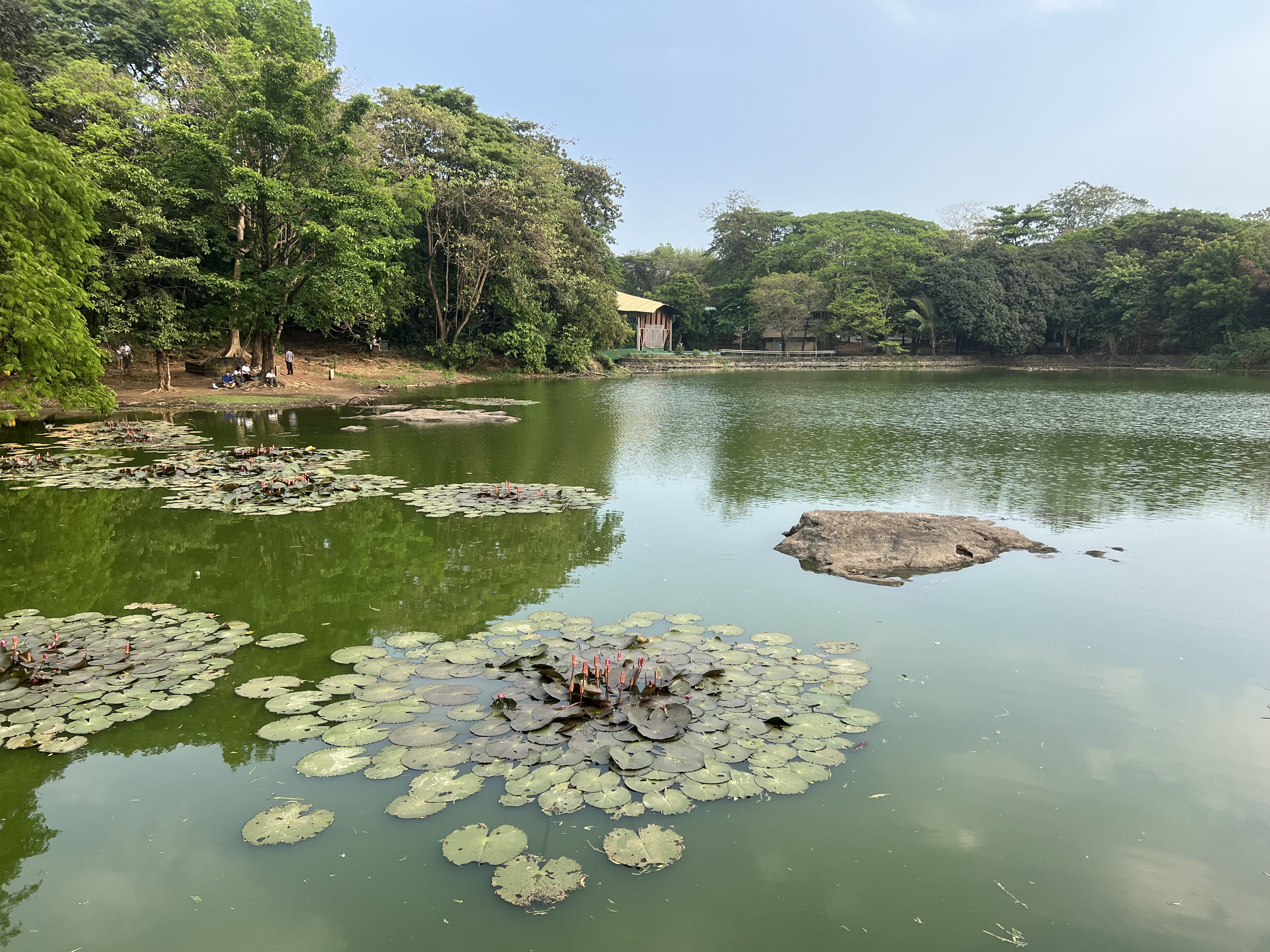
Lagoon of the Ninoy Aquino Parks & Wildlife Center, a nature reserve within Metro Manila

There are four national parks in Metro Manila. These are the Rizal Park, Paco Park, and Fort Santiago in the City of Manila and Quezon Memorial National Park in Quezon City. Rizal Park and Paco Park are managed by the National Parks and Development Committee (NPDC), while Fort Santiago is managed by the Intramuros Administration. A tripartite agreement between the Quezon City Government, the National Historical Institute and the NPDC transferred the management of Quezon Memorial National Park to the Quezon City Government. The region also has three protected areas, namely the Rizal Park, Ninoy Aquino Parks & Wildlife Center and the Manila Bay Beach Resort.

Rizal Park, also known as Luneta Park, is considered the largest urban park in Asia with an area of 58 hectares (140 acres). The park along with the historic walled area of Intramuros are designated as flagship destination to become a tourism enterprise zone according to the Tourism Act of 2009. Paco Park is a recreational garden which was once the city's municipal cemetery built by the Dominicans during the Spanish colonial period. Filipino Landscape architect IP Santos, the "Father of Philippine Landscape Architecture", was commissioned to do the design of converting the former cemetery into a park.

Manila Zoo is the oldest zoo in Asia, which was founded in 1959. It is the home to more than a thousand animals from 90 different species including the 40-year-old elephant, Mali. The zoo has an average of 4,000 visitors weekly. An estimated 40,000 tourists visit the zoo each month.

La Mesa Ecopark is a 33-hectare well-developed sanctuary around the La Mesa Watershed. It was established through a joint partnership between the Metropolitan Waterworks and Sewerage System, ABS-CBN, and the Quezon City Government. La Mesa Ecopark, along with the Ninoy Aquino Parks & Wildlife Center, are important nature reserves in the Philippines.

The Las Piñas-Parañaque Critical Habitat and Ecotourism Area (LPPCHEA) was declared as a critical habitat by the Government of the Philippines in 2007 and was listed by the Ramsar Convention as a Wetland of International Importance in 2013. LPPCHEA is composed of the Freedom Island in Parañaque and the Long Island in Las Piñas that covers 175 hectares and features a mangrove forest of eight species, tidal mudflats, secluded ponds with fringing salt-tolerant vegetation, a coastal lagoon, and a beach.

== Administration ==
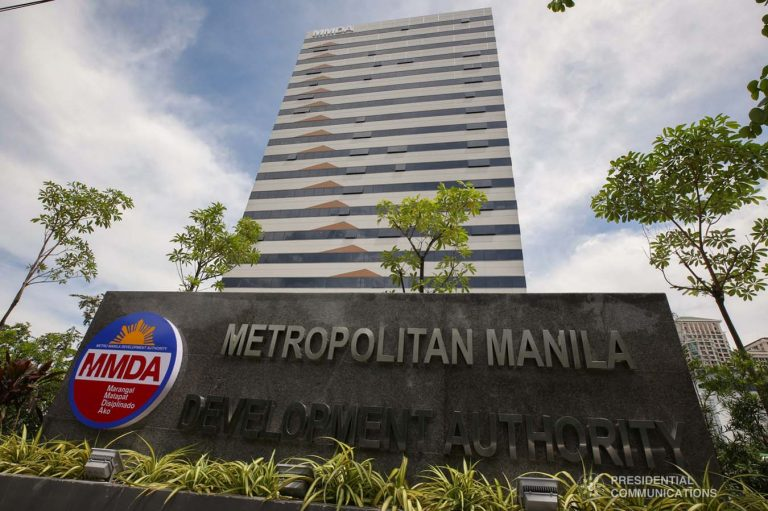
The Metropolitan Manila Development Authority (MMDA) headquarters since 2022

Malacañan Palace is the official residence and principal workplace of the President of the Philippines.

The Batasang Pambansa Complex is the seat of the House of Representatives.

The framework of government in Metro Manila is based on Republic Act No. 7160, also known as the "Local Government Code of 1991". This law outlines the powers and responsibilities of all local government units (LGUS) in the Philippines and thus forms the basis of inter-local governmental relations among the area's constituent local governments. The local government code grants these units significant political and administrative autonomy in accordance with the principles of decentralization and devolution of power. The autonomy of the 16 cities and 1 municipality presents a challenge to the coordination of policy and service delivery across the multiple autonomous local government units, and is thus the underlying dilemma of metropolitan governance in the region. Previously Metro Manila was governed by a regional government authority, the Metro Manila Commission and was headed by a governor.

The Metropolitan Manila Development Authority (MMDA) is the agency responsible for the urban planning, policy-making, coordination, and the delivery of public services in Metro Manila without diminution of the autonomy of the local government units. Currently, the MMDA is responsible for the region's traffic management along national highways, flood control and sewerage management, disaster risk reduction, and garbage collection. It also conducts an annual metro-wide earthquake drill, rescues vagrants in coordination with the local and national social welfare agencies, and runs the annual Metro Manila Film Festival. MMDA manages the Pasig River Ferry Service.

A bill was introduced in 2014 proposing the creation of a new governing body in Metro Manila to be known as the Metropolitan Manila Regional Administration (MMRA). Unlike the MMDA which is limited to being an administrative coordinating body, the proposed MMRA will have police and other typical municipal powers and is more akin to the Bangsamoro Autonomous Region in Muslim Mindanao.

=== Local Government Units ===
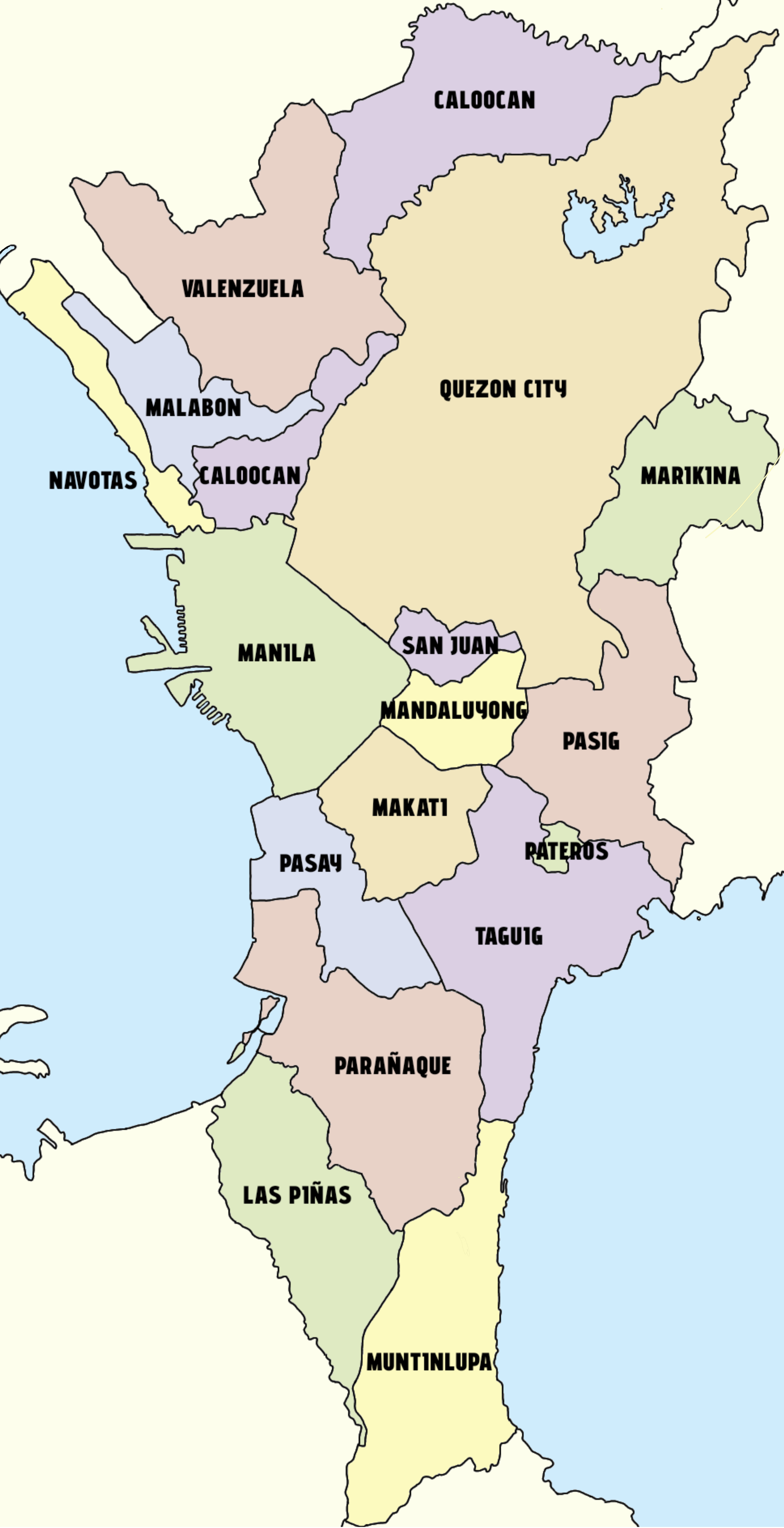
Map of Metro Manila with NAMRIA-drawn boundaries

The political and administrative boundaries of the National Capital Region has not changed since its formation in 1975 as a public corporation under Presidential Decree No. 824. They are composed of sixteen independent cities, classified as highly urbanized cities, and one independent municipality: Pateros. However, a few territorial changes occurred within the region, such as the reintegration and transfer of municipal control of the Enlisted Men's Barrios barangays from Makati to Taguig, while coastal cities such as the City of Manila, Navotas, Pasay and Parañaque expanded their territories through land reclamation.

- † Regional center

| City or municipality | Population (2024) | | Area^{[a]} | | Density | | GDP (2025) | GDP per capita | Incorporated (city) | Ref. |
| | | | km^{2} | sq mi | /km^{2} | /sq mi | | | | |
|---|---|---|---|---|---|---|---|---|---|---|
| Caloocan | 12.2% | 1,712,945 | 55.80 | 21.54 | 31,000 | 80,000 | ₱259.15 billion | ₱153,541 | 1962 | |
| Las Piñas | 4.4% | 615,549 | 32.69 | 12.62 | 19,000 | 49,000 | ₱121.78 billion | ₱199,426 | 1997 | |
| Makati | 2.2% | 309,770 | 18.17 | 7.02 | 17,000 | 44,000 | ₱1.27 trillion | ₱4.26 million | 1995 | |
| Malabon | 2.8% | 389,929 | 15.71 | 6.07 | 25,000 | 65,000 | ₱73.8 billion | ₱194,470 | 2001 | |
| Mandaluyong | 3.3% | 465,902 | 11.26 | 4.35 | 41,000 | 110,000 | ₱332.54 billion | ₱711,853 | 1994 | |
| † Manila | 13.6% | 1,902,590 | 42.34 | 16.35^{[b]} | 45,000 | 120,000 | ₱1.06 trillion | ₱565,047 | 1571 | |
| Marikina | 3.4% | 471,323 | 21.52 | 8.31 | 22,000 | 57,000 | ₱121.96 billion | ₱268,312 | 1996 | |
| Muntinlupa | 3.9% | 552,225 | 39.75 | 15.35 | 14,000 | 36,000 | ₱284.19 billion | ₱499,945 | 1995 | |
| Navotas | 1.8% | 252,878 | 8.94 | 3.45 | 28,000 | 73,000 | ₱42.54 billion | ₱179,662 | 2007 | |
| Parañaque | 5.0% | 703,245 | 46.57 | 17.98 | 15,000 | 39,000 | ₱383.76 billion | ₱533,443 | 1998 | |
| Pasay | 3.2% | 453,186 | 13.97 | 5.39 | 32,000 | 83,000 | ₱379.07 billion | ₱844,468 | 1947 | |
| Pasig | 6.1% | 853,050 | 48.46 | 18.71 | 18,000 | 47,000 | ₱541.59 billion | ₱639,534 | 1995 | |
| Pateros | 0.5% | 67,319 | 1.66 | 0.64^{[c]} | 41,000 | 110,000 | ₱9.76 billion | ₱154,587 | 1909 (Not a city) | |
| Quezon City | 22.0% | 3,084,270 | 171.71 | 66.30 | 18,000 | 47,000 | ₱1.4 trillion | ₱474,963 | 1939 | |
| San Juan | 1.0% | 134,312 | 5.95 | 2.30 | 23,000 | 60,000 | ₱95.9 billion | ₱773,336 | 2007 | |
| Taguig | 9.3% | 1,308,085 | 47.28 | 18.25 | 28,000 | 73,000 | ₱686.68 billion | ₱502,198 | 2004 | |
| Valenzuela | 5.2% | 725,173 | 47.02 | 18.15 | 15,000 | 39,000 | ₱184.69 billion | ₱240,608 | 1998 | |
| Total | | 14,001,751 | 636.00 | 245.56 | 22,000 | 57,000 | | | | |
1. Land area figures are from the Philippine Institute of Volcanology and Seismology and Geoscience Australia.; 2. Land area of Manila from the City of Manila official government website.; 3. Land area of Pateros from the Municipality of Pateros official government website.

==== Districts ====
Unlike other administrative regions in the Philippines, Metro Manila is not composed of provinces. Instead, the region is divided into four geographic areas called "districts". The districts have their district centers at the four original cities in the region: the city-district of Manila (Capital District), Quezon City (Eastern Manila), Caloocan (Northern Manila, also informally known as Camanava), and Pasay (Southern Manila). The districts serve mainly to organize the region's local government units for fiscal and statistical purposes.

Districts of Metro Manila

Districts of Metro Manila
| District | Cities/Municipality | Population (2024) | Area |
|---|---|---|---|
| Capital District (1st District) | Manila | 1,902,590 | 42.34 km^{2} (16.35 sq mi) |
| Eastern Manila District (2nd District) | Mandaluyong; Marikina; Pasig; Quezon City; San Juan | 5,008,857 | 236.36 km^{2} (91.26 sq mi) |
| Northern Manila District (Camanava) (3rd District) | Caloocan; Malabon; Navotas; Valenzuela | 3,080,925 | 126.42 km^{2} (48.81 sq mi) |
| Southern Manila District (4th District) | Las Piñas; Makati; Muntinlupa; Parañaque; Pasay; Pateros; Taguig | 4,009,379 | 208.28 km^{2} (80.42 sq mi) |
| Metro Manila | | 14,001,751 | 636.00 km^{2} (245.56 sq mi) |
Sources: Population; Land area; Pateros area

=== National government ===
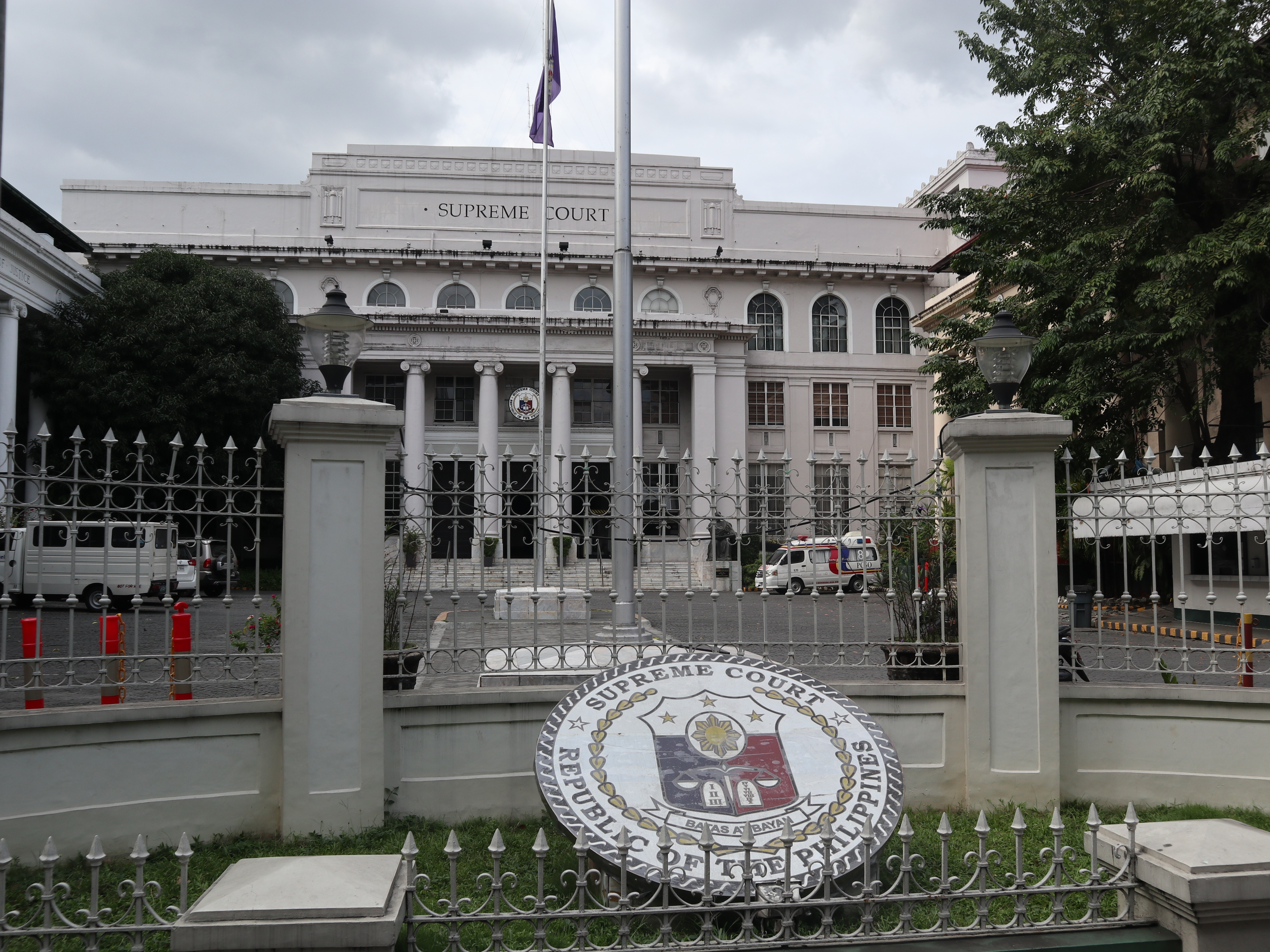
Supreme Court of the Philippines

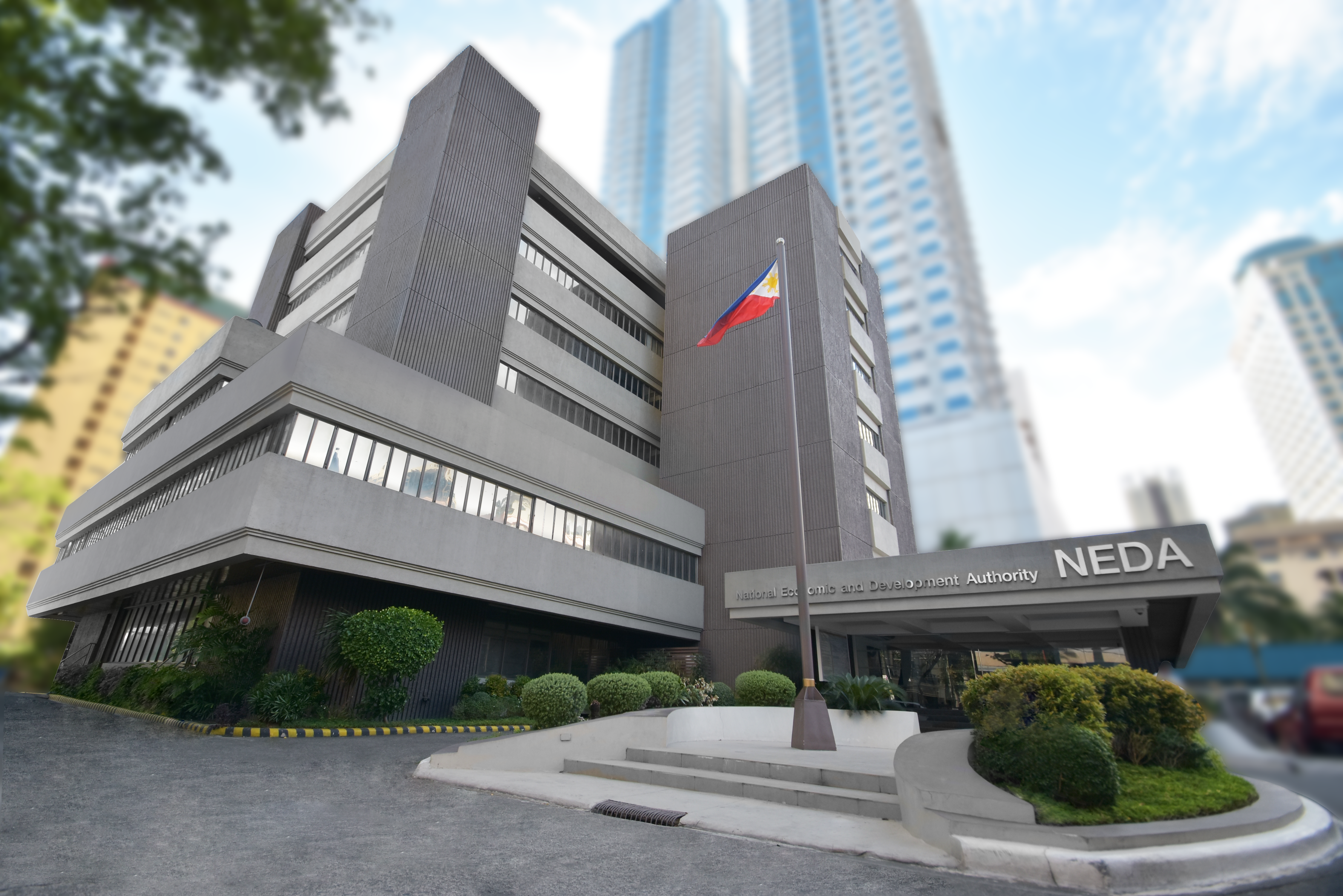
Department of Economy, Planning, and Development

Metro Manila, the National Capital Region, is the seat of the national government. All three branches of the government: the executive (Cabinet led by the President), legislature (Congress), and the judiciary (Supreme Court of the Philippines) are seated here. Most of the executive departments were concentrated in Manila and Quezon City. Important economic and financial institutions headquartered in the region are the Asian Development Bank, Bangko Sentral ng Pilipinas, Development Bank of the Philippines, and the Land Bank of the Philippines.

Manila, the capital city of the country, is the home to Malacañan Palace, the official residence and office of the President of the Philippines. The city is also the home to the Supreme Court of the Philippines. Other key national institutions based in Manila are the Court of Appeals, the Bangko Sentral ng Pilipinas, and the Departments of Budget and Management, Finance, Health, Justice, Labor and Employment and Public Works and Highways. Meanwhile, other departments are located elsewhere in the metropolis: the Department of Economy, Planning, and Development is in Pasig, Department of Foreign Affairs is in Pasay, Department of Migrant Workers is in Mandaluyong, Department of Science and Technology is in Taguig, Department of Transportation is in San Juan, while the Departments of Tourism and Trade and Industry are in Makati.

As the former capital, Quezon City is the home to numerous government departments, agencies and institutions. The House of Representatives of the Philippines (Lower House), as well as the Departments of Agrarian Reform, Agriculture, Environment and Natural Resources, Human Settlements and Urban Development, Information and Communications Technology, Interior and Local Government, National Defense and Social Welfare and Development calls the city home. Independent constitutional bodies such as the Commission on Audit and the Office of the Ombudsman, as well as special courts such as the Court of Tax Appeals and the Sandiganbayan are located in the city.

The main office of the Government Service Insurance System in Pasay serves as home to the Senate of the Philippines. The Coconut Palace once served as the official office and residence of the Vice President of the Philippines in 2010–2016 and then the Quezon City Reception House for 2016-2022.

=== Future expansion ===
There is a high demand for the inclusion of San Pedro, Laguna in Metro Manila. Support groups from the local government and non-government organizations are striving to incorporate San Pedro into Metro Manila. San Pedro was looked at as the 18th member of Metro Manila during former MMDA chairman Francis Tolentino's term. Tolentino pushed for the inclusion of San Pedro in the National Capital Region to become its 18th member city.

== Demographics ==
Population census of Metro Manila

| Year | Pop. | ±% p.a. |
|---|---|---|
| 1903 | 328,939 | — |
| 1918 | 461,166 | +2.28% |
| 1939 | 993,889 | +3.72% |
| 1948 | 1,569,128 | +5.20% |
| 1960 | 2,462,488 | +3.83% |
| 1970 | 3,966,695 | +4.88% |
| 1975 | 4,970,006 | +4.63% |
| 1980 | 5,925,884 | +3.58% |

| Year | Pop. | ±% p.a. |
|---|---|---|
| 1990 | 7,948,392 | +2.98% |
| 1995 | 9,454,040 | +3.30% |
| 2000 | 9,932,560 | +1.06% |
| 2007 | 11,566,325 | +2.12% |
| 2010 | 11,855,975 | +0.90% |
| 2015 | 12,877,253 | +1.59% |
| 2020 | 13,484,462 | +0.97% |
| 2024 | 14,001,751 | +0.91% |

Source: Philippine Statistics Authority

Metro Manila has a population of 14,001,751 according to the 2024 national census. It is an ethnically diverse metropolis, and has a long history of immigration both local and international. People from all over the Philippines flock to Metro Manila in search of better economic opportunities. NCR's total urban area, composed of the urban agglomeration which refers to the continuous urban expansion of Metro Manila into the provinces of Bulacan, Cavite, Laguna and Batangas has an estimated population of 24,100,000 as of 2015. It is the second most populous (after Calabarzon) and most densely populated region in the Philippines, the 7th most populous metropolitan area in Asia, and the 6th most populous urban area in the world.

As of 2024, the most populous cities in Metro Manila are Quezon City (3,084,270), Manila (1,902,590), Caloocan (1,712,945), Taguig (1,308,085), Pasig (853,050), Valenzuela (725,173), Parañaque (703,245), Las Piñas (615,549), Muntinlupa (552,225), and Marikina (471,323).

Metro Manila's two key demographic features are its density and diversity. It is often regarded as one of the most diverse city in Asia. The region also has an extremely high population density.

=== Poverty, housing and urban slums ===
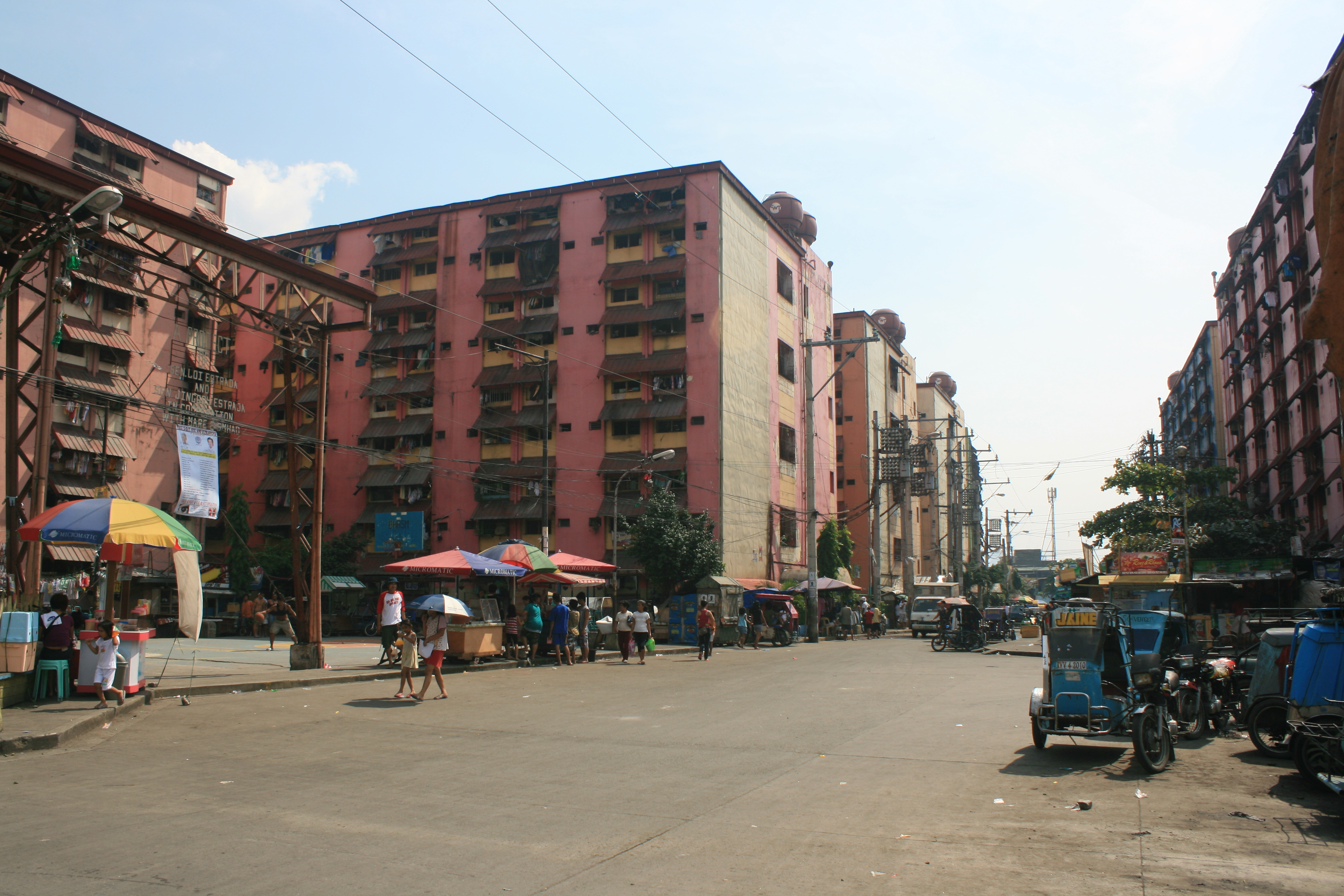
The Smokey Mountain Development and Reclamation Project for the former Smokey Mountain dumpsite and slum community is one of the in-city relocation housing for informal settler families in Tondo, Manila

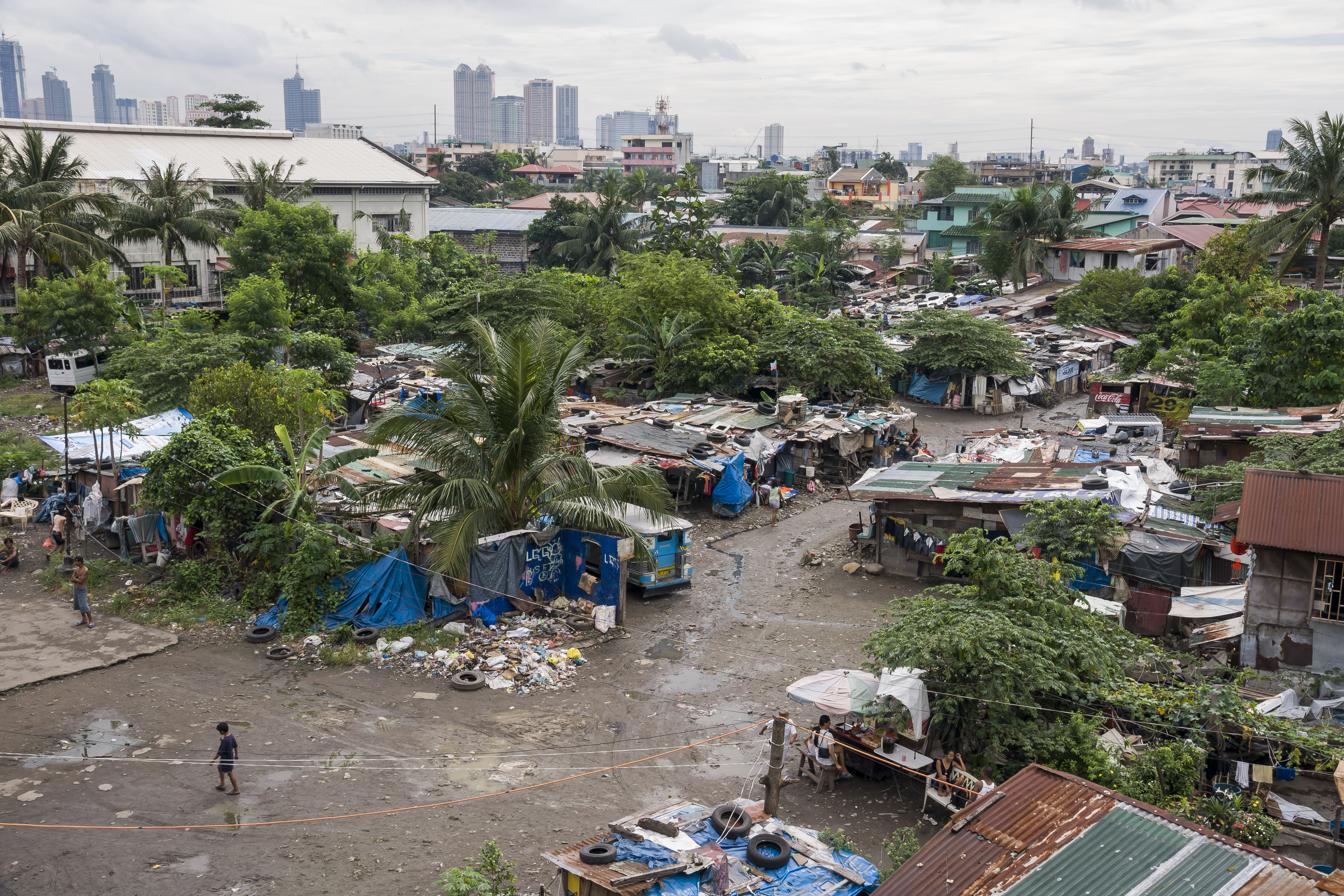
A squatter colony in Mandaluyong in 2008, almost all of the informal settlers families within Metro Manila came from the provinces, who went to Metro Manila to seek better employment opportunities

From the 1980s up to the present, informal settlers (squatters) have accounted for roughly one-third of the Metro Manila population. A majority of informal settlers belong to the middle-class. In 2014, there are an estimated four million slum dwellers living in Metro Manila. Homelessness is also a major problem in Metro Manila. However, these are being addressed by creating in-city relocation housing, and by relocating informal settler families in low-density housing built in the nearby provinces of Batangas, Bulacan, Cavite, Laguna and Rizal. During the American occupation, housing policies in Manila dealt the problem of sanitation and concentration of settlers around business areas. Among those implemented were business codes and sanitation laws in slum areas in the 1930s. During this period and until the 1950s, new communities were opened for relocation. Among these were Projects 1–8 in Quezon City and the Vitas tenement houses in Tondo. The government implemented the Public Housing Policy in 1947 that established the People's Homesite and Housing Corporation (PHHC). A few years later, it put up the Slum Clearance Committee which, with the help of the PHHC, relocated thousands of families from Tondo and Quezon City to Sapang Palay in San Jose del Monte, Bulacan in the 1960s.

During the time of President Ferdinand Marcos, the World Bank and the Asian Development Bank supported the programs for the "development of relocation" and "on-site development". Carmona and Dasmariñas in Cavite and San Pedro in Laguna opened as relocation sites. Along with the establishment of the National Housing Authority (Philippines), Presidential Decree 772 made squatting a crime, making the Philippines one of only two countries (the other is South Africa) where squatting is a crime. The government formulated the National Shelter Program which became the over-all framework for dealing with housing needs of all income classes.

Imelda Marcos held both the position as Governor of Metro Manila and as Minister of Human Settlements and Ecology (MHSE) until the downfall of the dictatorship in 1986. The MHSE, through loans from the World Bank, initiated the Bagong Lipunan Improvement of Sites and Services (BLISS) housing projects not only in Metro Manila but also in other provinces.

Men playing basketball in a makeshift court in the streets of San Nicolas, Manila, near the slums

From 1960 to 1992, the government transferred some 328,000 families to resettlement sites 25 to 40 km (16 to 25 mi) from Metro Manila. According to the Asian Coalition on Housing Rights, during President Corazon C. Aquino's time, the government would bring some 100,000 persons to relocation sites yearly. During the said period, Sapang Palay and Carmona had a 60% abandonment rate. Congress enacted Republic Act No. 7279 or the Urban Development and Housing Act (UDHA) in 1992. The law gave a new name for the squatters: informal settlers. Essentially, UDHA gives protection for big private ownership of land in the urban areas, ensuring that these are protected from illegal occupants. The law also widened the scope of private sector participation in the National Shelter Program (NSP).

In the middle of the presidency of Gloria Macapagal Arroyo, infrastructure projects of the government led to the demolition of hundreds of thousands of families (from along railways, C-4 Road, C-5 Road, and from Fort Bonifacio). During the same period, new relocation sites in Bulacan, Valenzuela and Caloocan opened.

Poverty incidence of Metro Manila (%)

Source: Philippine Statistics Authority

==== Housing projects ====
The different LGUs of Metro Manila has initiated their own housing projects to shelter the populace. Makati has constructed Makati Homes I for city government employees, while Makati Homes 2 in Rizal, Taguig is available for all residents of the city. The city also has off-city sites housing projects located in the provinces of Laguna and Bulacan where informal settlers from the city are relocated. Valenzuela has constructed Disiplina Village in different locations of the city, housing thousands of former informal settlers. These villages are located in barangays Arkong Bato, Bignay, Lingunan and Ugong. These villages are integrated with their own schools, community centers, sports facilities, police, fire and health services.

=== Languages ===
The primary mainstream spoken casual vernacular language is Tagalog (Filipino), which is taught in all schools across Metro Manila under Filipino class. The main formal medium of instruction used in schools and the main language (at least primarily in most written contexts) for commerce, industry, and government is English. (Note: Native English is most concentrated here among affluent urban households, though it still represents less than 1% to 2% of households as an L1. The highest concentration of native English-speaking households in the country, largely linked to urban, high-socioeconomic status families.) Meanwhile, Spanish formerly moribund across Metro Manila, besides the rare few families who may privately use it and the Spanish taught in a few schools and universities as a foreign language elective. Among speakers of Hokkien may also occasionally be heard spoken amongst fellow speakers especially within households, schools, churches, temples, businesses who privately use it, while Mandarin (Standard Chinese) is taught in Chinese class in and as a foreign language elective in a few schools and universities. There are also the occasional speaker of other Philippine languages coming from the provinces working, studying, or living in Metro Manila, such as speakers of Cebuano Bisaya, Ilocano, Hiligaynon (Ilonggo), Central Bikolano, Chavacano, Kapampangan, Pangasinense, Waray, etc. There are also the rare that speaks Japanese, that speaks Korean, that speaks Farsi (Persian), that speaks Punjabi or etc. There are also a few Japanese schools teaching Japanese in Japanese class in Metro Manila, such as the Manila Japanese School and of course, a few schools and universities teaching it as a foreign language elective. Other languages also taught as foreign language electives in some universities and schools in Metro Manila besides those aforementioned are those such as, French, Korean, German, Italian, Thai, Indonesian, Portuguese, Russian, etc. Besides Filipino, there are also other newspapers distributed across Metro Manila in languages such as Mandarin (i.e. United Daily News, World News, Chinese Commercial News, etc.), Japanese (i.e. Manila Shimbun), Korean (i.e. Manila Seoul, Weekly Manila, Ilyo Shinmun, etc.) to cater to the aforementioned readers.

== Economy ==
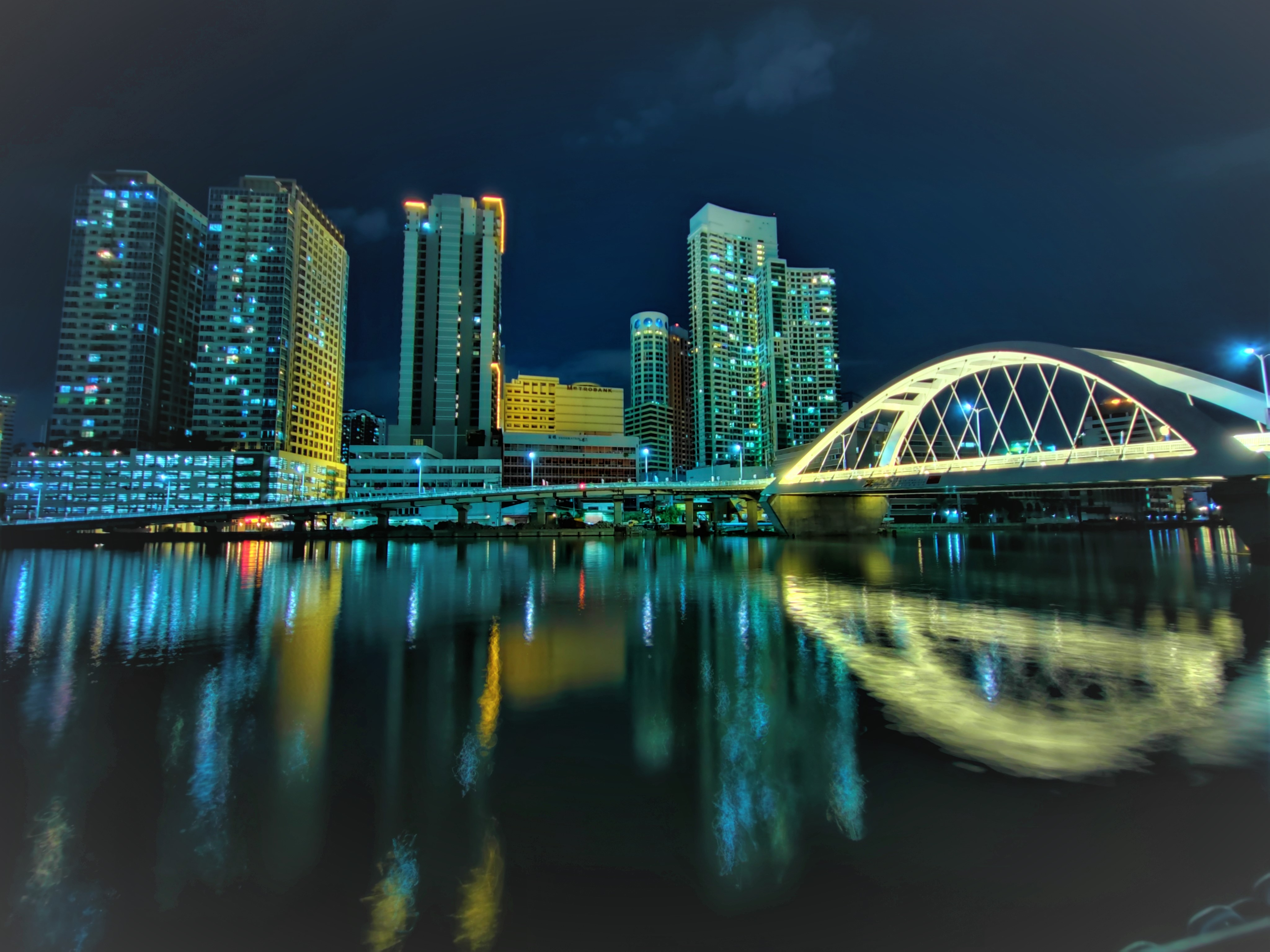
Binondo, founded in 1594, is considered as the oldest chinatown in the world.

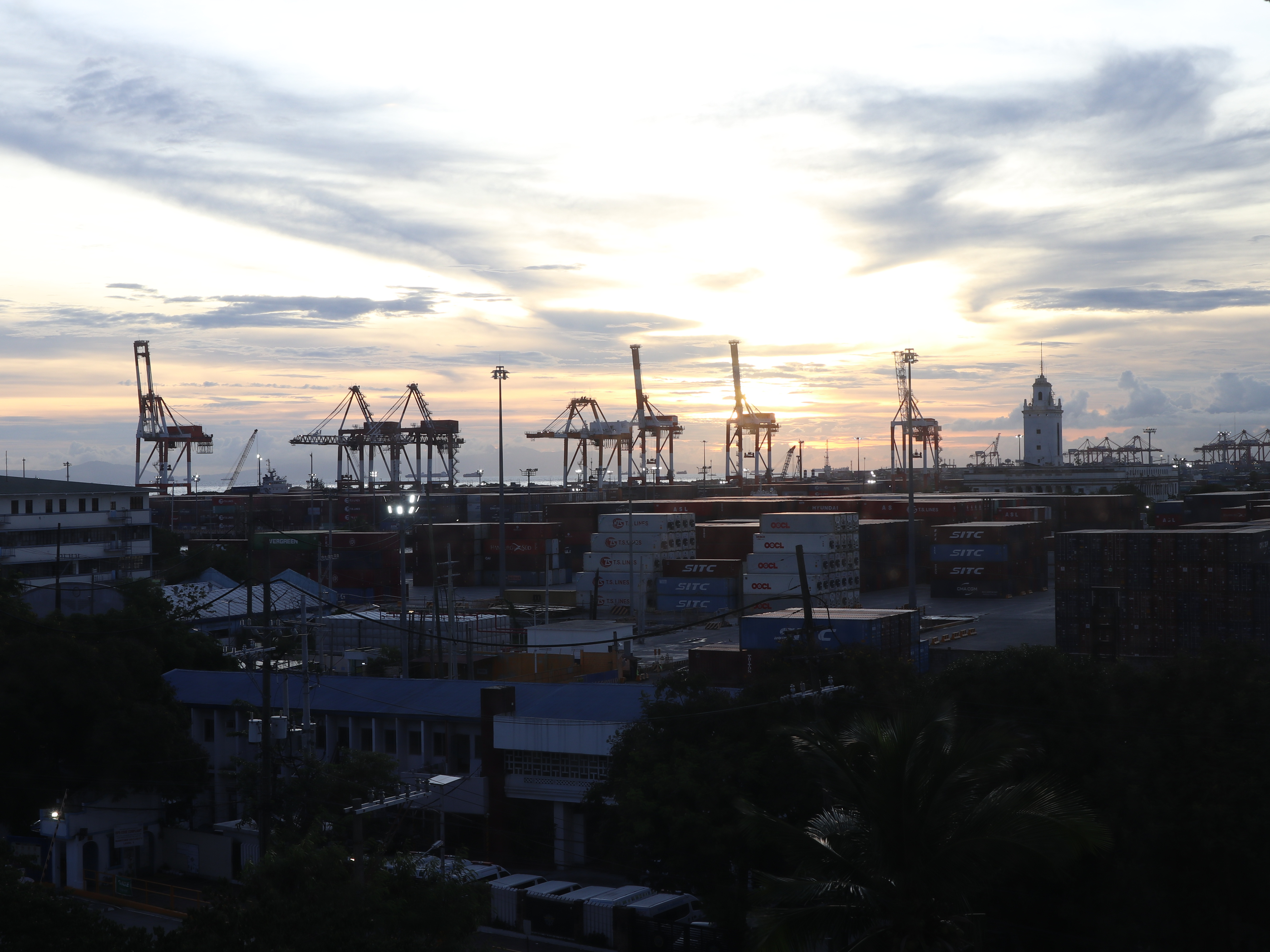
The Port of Manila is the largest and the premier international shipping gateway of the Philippines.

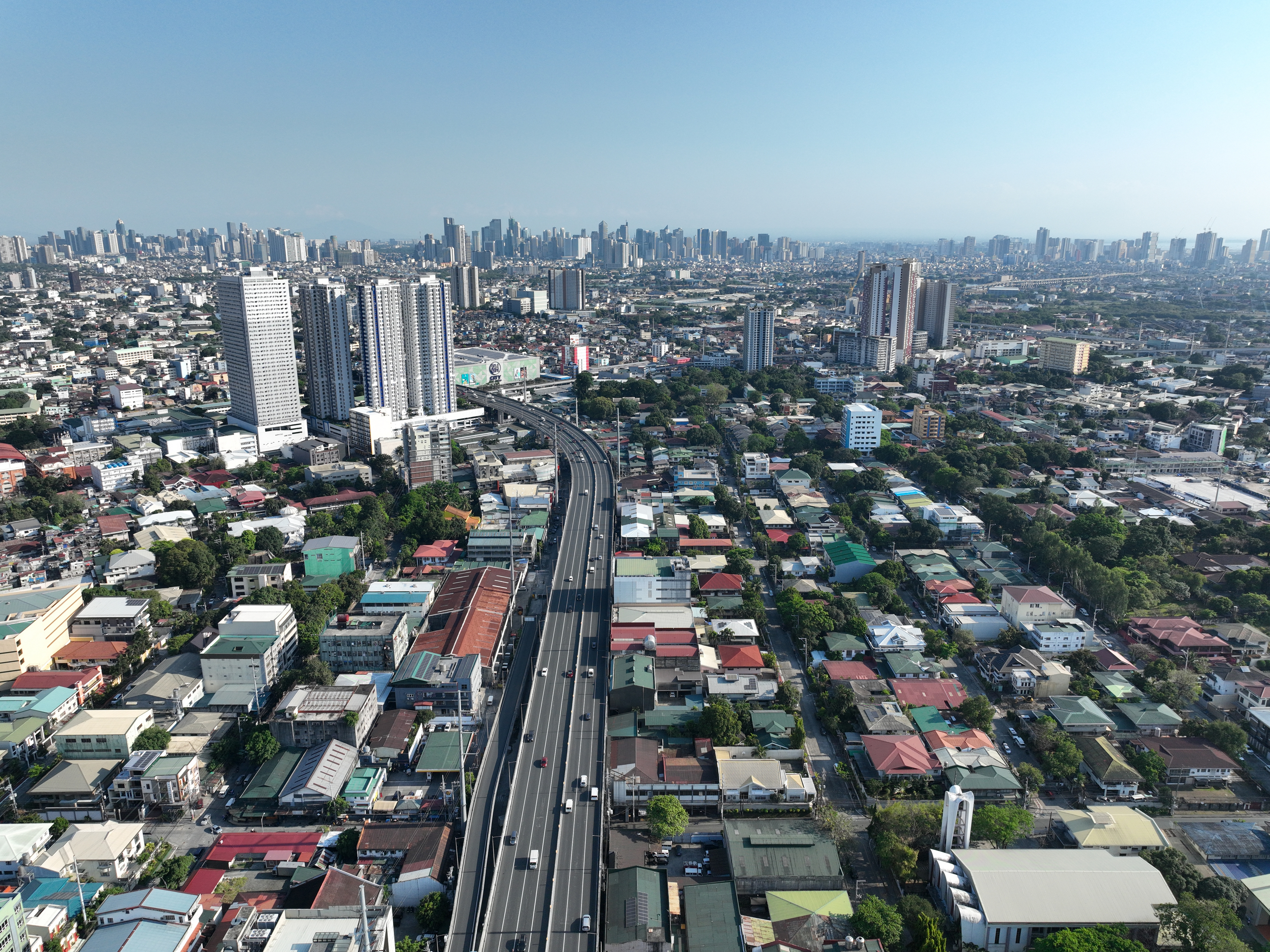
Aerial view of Metro Manila

The National Capital Region accounts for 31.2% of the gross domestic product of the Philippines in 2024. Furthermore, it has the highest per capita GDP of the country at ₱595,768 (US$10,426). As of 2025, 4 of the 10 largest contributor in the economy of the Philippines is located within Metro Manila: Quezon City, Makati, the City of Manila, and Taguig. According to the Brookings Institution, the 2014 share of output by industry in Metro Manila is as follows: trade and tourism: 31.4%, business/finance: 28.6%, local/non-market: 15.6%, manufacturing: 12.5%, transportation: 4.9%, construction: 4%, utilities: 2.8%, and commodities: 0.3%. The employment rate in the region is at 91.3% as of April 2021.

Metro Manila has an office vacancy rate of 19.8% by the end of 2024, due to the expiration of pre-pandemic leases and the 2023 ban on Philippine offshore gaming operator by President Marcos Jr. About 791,000 square meters of office spaces were vacated in 2024, up from 581,000 square meters reported in 2023. As of end of 2024, the vacancy rate for Metro Manila are as follows: Makati Central Business District: 8.3%, Ortigas Center: 12.8%, Fort Bonifacio: 17.2%, Quezon City: 22.8%, Ortigas Fringe: 24.2%, Alabang: 32.5%, Bay Area: 34.9%, and Makati Fringe: 35.9%.

Metro Manila makes it to the "Global Top 30" cities according to property consultancy firm Jones Lang LaSalle, citing its economic scale, vast population, large gross domestic product and BPO specialization as its competitive edge. Furthermore, the region ranks 3rd for the top business process outsourcing global destinations, next to Bangalore and Mumbai. The region's retail sector remains strong, bolstered by remittances abroad, BPOs, and its tourism sector.

Historically, the main business district of the metropolis was Binondo, where commercial trading flourished since the 15th century. By the 1960s, economic activities shifted from Binondo to Makati. It transformed Makati into one of the leading financial centers in Asia. Still, Binondo remained as a cultural and financial center because of the vast Chinese population residing and doing business in the area.

Nominal wages are what Metro Manila's current minimum wage rates are known as. The Philippine government has set these wage rates at a fixed amount. The minimum wage of the region is at ₱645.00 ($13.1) per-day for non-agricultural workers and at ₱608.00 ($12.35) per-day for those working in the agricultural sector, the highest minimum wage among all the 17 regions of the country. However, an increase of ₱25 was made and implemented in November 2018.

On the other hand, the amount after inflation is what is considered the real minimum wage. For instance, the non-agricultural employees of NCR typically receive ₱428.23 ($8.7) per day as opposed to ₱537 ($10.9). The minimum salary for agricultural employees in Manila (including plantation and non-plantation workers) is ₱398.72 ($8.1) after accounting for inflation.

=== Central business districts ===
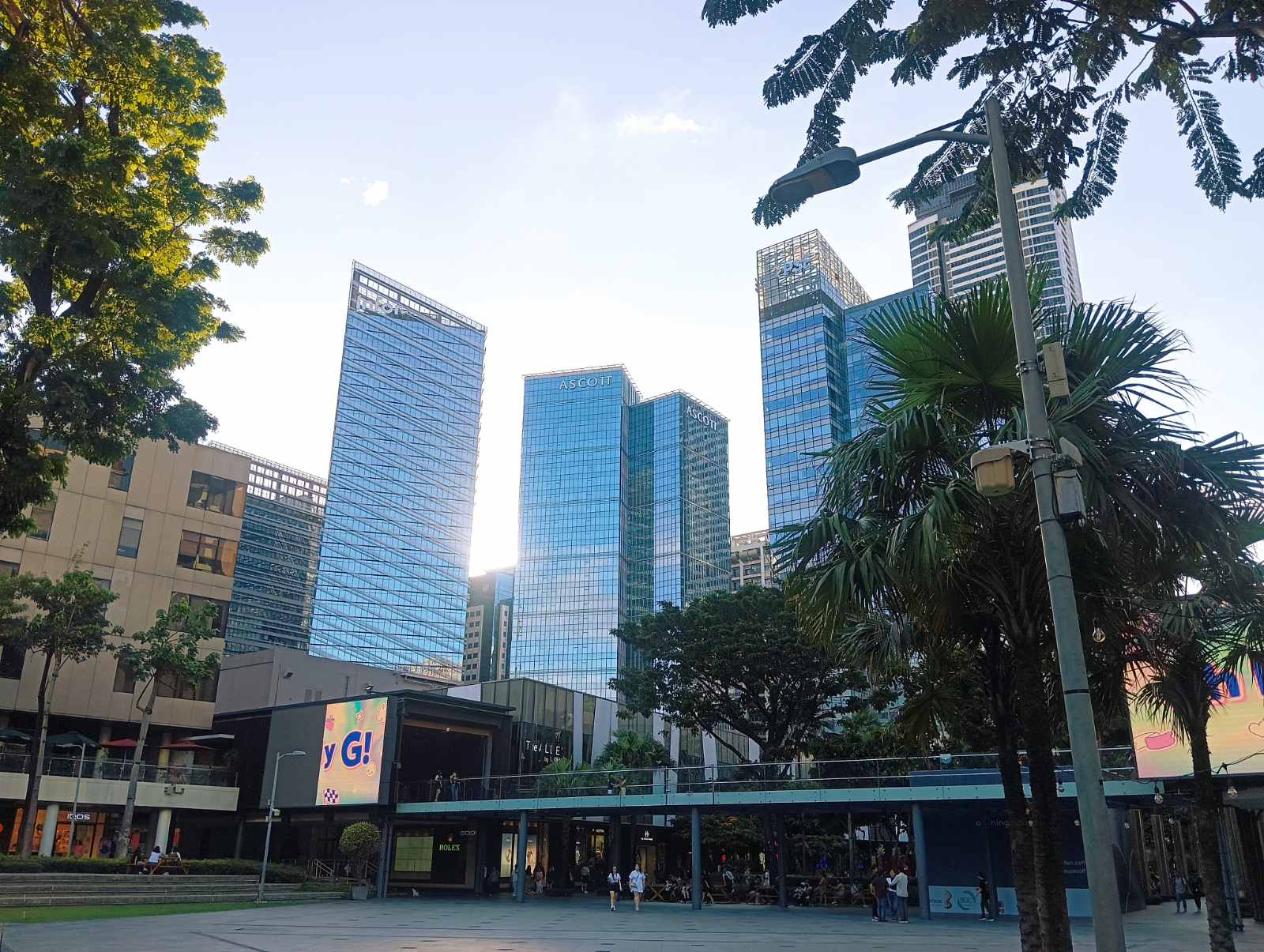
Bonifacio High Street in Bonifacio Global City, Taguig

Filinvest City in Muntinlupa

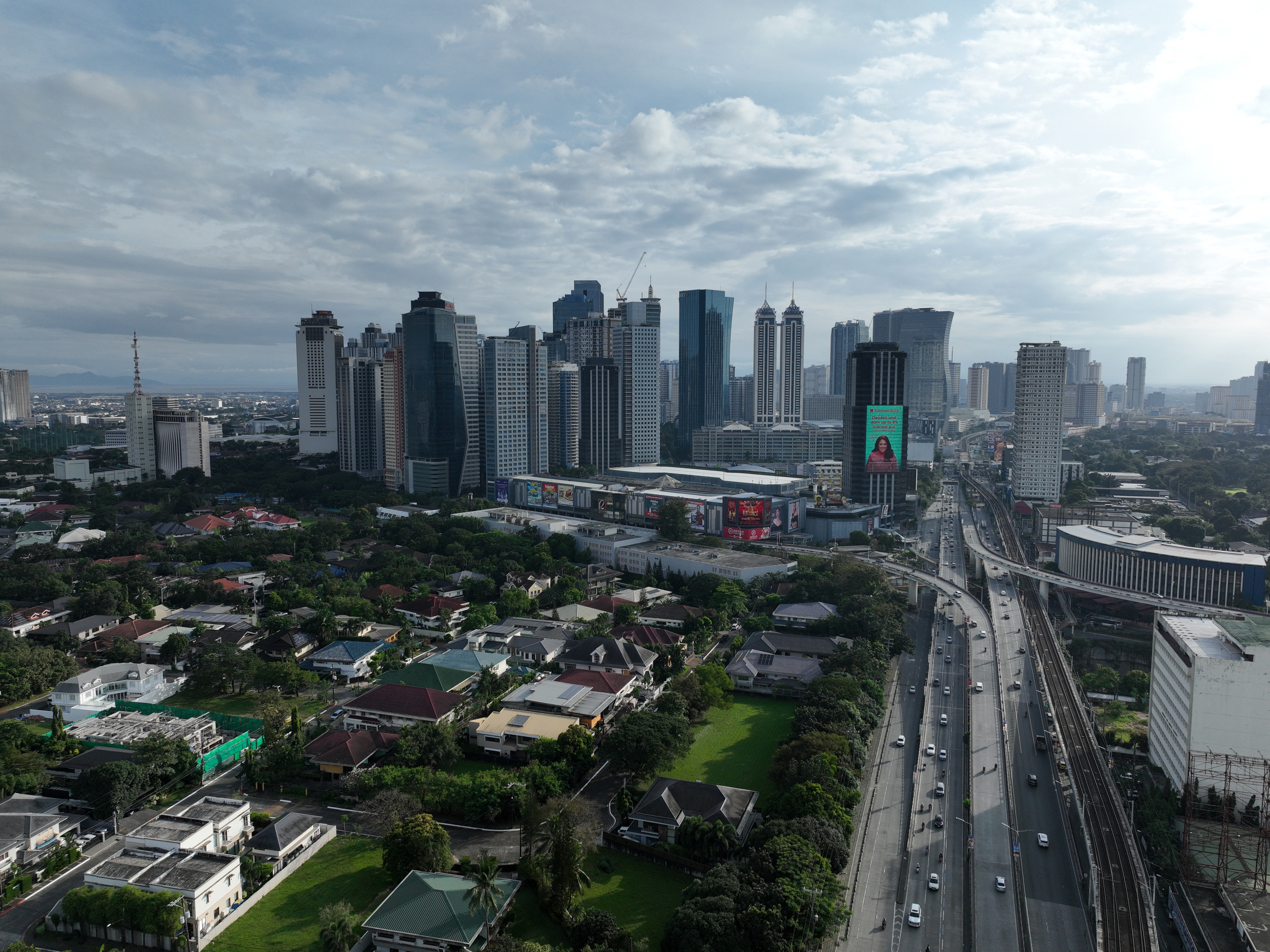
Ortigas Center in Pasig and Mandaluyong, with a small portion of it located within Quezon City

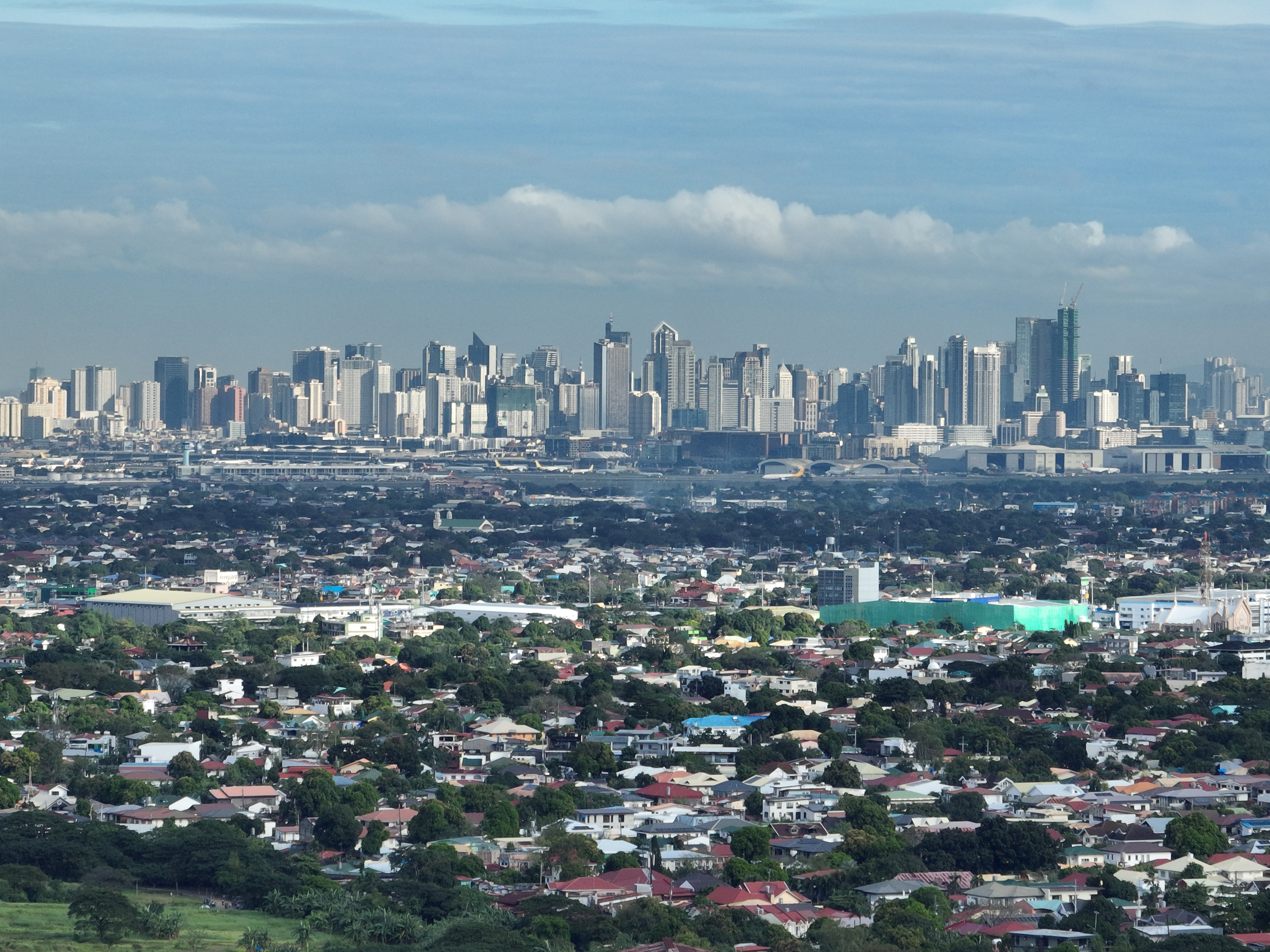
Skyline of Makati, the premier financial center of the Philippines

Metro Manila has many central business districts (CBD), which categorizes it under the multiple nuclei model in human geography terms. The most prominent CBDs are the Makati Central Business District, Bonifacio Global City, Ortigas Center, Binondo, and Filinvest City. The region also has plenty of mixed-use developments owned and developed by private corporations such as the Ayala Corporation, Eton Properties, Megaworld Corporation and SM Prime Holdings.

The Makati Central Business District is the premier business and commercial center of the Philippines. It is the headquarters to most of the multinational corporations residing in the Philippines as well as the country's biggest commercial firms and BPO companies. The Central Business District has an office stock of 1.1 million square meters of Grade A and premium office space. It is the home to the tallest skyscrapers in the region as well as in the country.

Bonifacio Global City is the newest business district of Manila and is the premier financial and lifestyle center of the metropolis. It is located in the north-western part of Taguig. It used to be a military base known as Fort Bonifacio. The Bases and Conversion Development Authority (BCDA) privatized the property and its income from the sale was intended to be used for the modernization of the Armed Forces of the Philippines. Upon its privatization, the place was transformed into a business hub featuring numerous tourist attractions such as The Mind Museum, high-end shops, towering office skyscrapers, and luxurious lofts and condominiums. Bonifacio Global City will soon overtake the Makati Central Business District as the premier financial center of the country in the future. One of the reasons for it is that the Philippine Stock Exchange relocated its headquarters in BGC. Also, it has more spaces and land for future developments. It is also the most active business district, generating over 50 percent of the growth in property market and has more available space for rent or lease and sale than Makati.

Ortigas Center is a central business district located in Mandaluyong and Pasig, with a small portion of it located in Quezon City. Landmarks in Ortigas include the EDSA Shrine, Shangri-La Plaza and the SM Megamall. Furthermore, The Medical City has its main campus in Ortigas Center. Important financial and national institutions headquartered in Ortigas are the Asian Development Bank, Union Bank of the Philippines and the National Economic and Development Authority. Ortigas is also the home to the headquarters of San Miguel Corporation, Jollibee Foods Corporation, Lopez Group of Companies and The Manila Electric Company.

=== Shopping ===
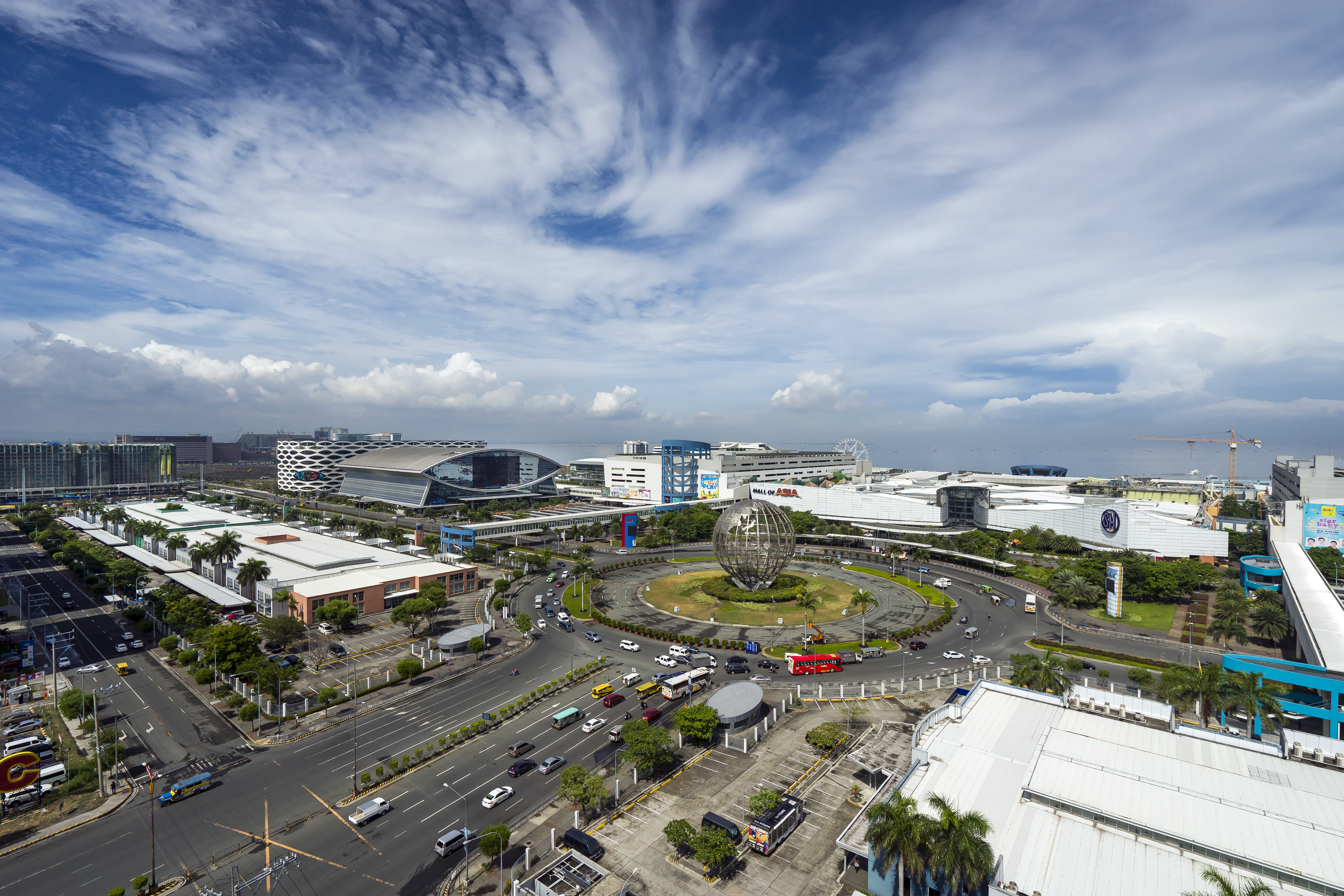
Aerial view of the SM Mall of Asia Complex, the 5th largest shopping mall in the world

Global Blue ranked Manila as one of the "Best Shopping Destinations" in Asia. Metro Manila is home to some of the largest shopping malls in the world, five of which are in the top 20. SM Mall of Asia in Pasay ranks as the 5th largest shopping mall in the world, followed by SM North EDSA in Quezon City bagging the 13th place. Meanwhile, SM Megamall in Mandaluyong ranks as the 15th largest shopping mall in the world. Almost all of these malls are anchored in a mixed-use development which contains residences and offices, ensuring sustainability in the shopping mall's operations and commerce. Some are also integrated into transit-oriented development such as One Ayala in Makati, which is linked to the EDSA Carousel and the Ayala station of MRT Line 3.

Mandaluyong is known as the shopping capital of the Philippines due to the presence of numerous malls, some of which are standing next to each other and forming a cluster of malls. Metro Manila has a diverse range of luxury and upscale shopping malls such as the Shangri-La Plaza and The Podium in Mandaluyong, Century City Mall, Glorietta, Greenbelt and Power Plant Mall in Makati, and Bonifacio High Street, Mitsukoshi BGC, and SM Aura in Taguig. Other prominent malls in region are Estancia in Pasig, Festival Alabang in Muntinlupa, Gateway Mall, Robinsons Magnolia and Trinoma in Quezon City, Greenhills in San Juan, Market! Market! and Venice Grand Canal Mall in Taguig, Riverbanks Center in Marikina, and Lucky Chinatown and Robinsons Manila in the City of Manila.

=== Tourism and gambling ===
Fort Santiago in Intramuros is a popular tourist destination

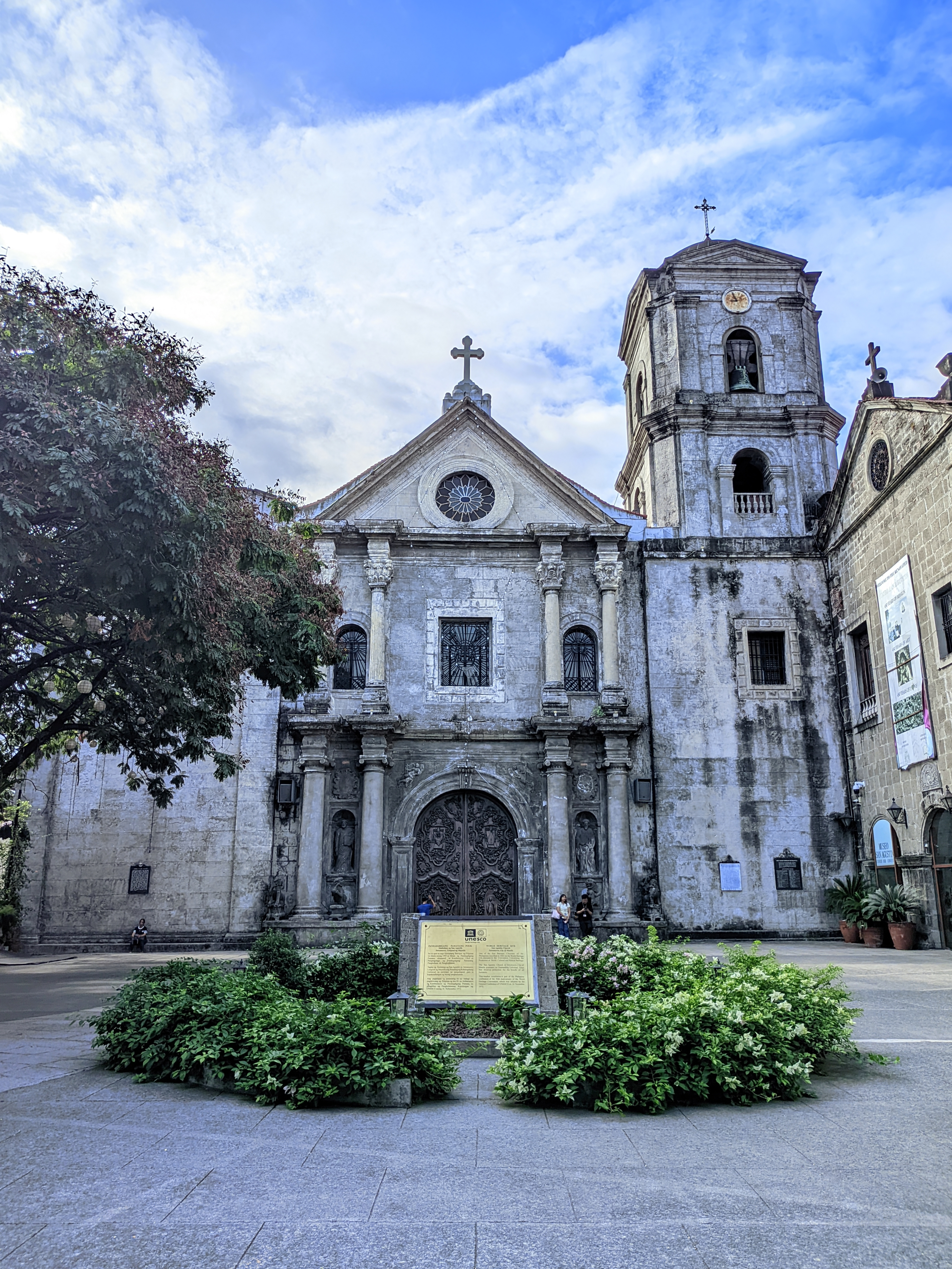
San Agustin Church, built in 1604, is a UNESCO World Heritage Site

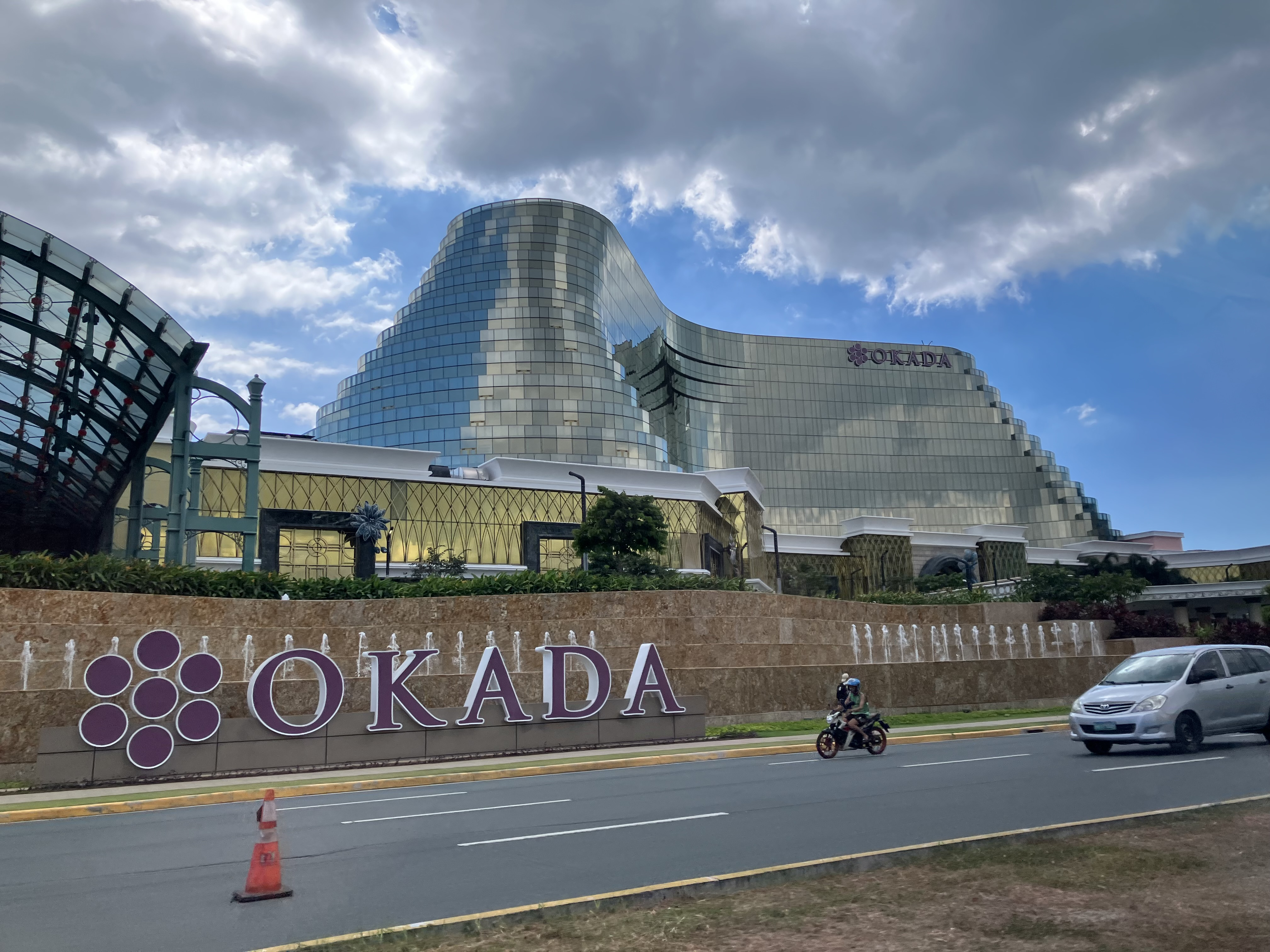
Okada Manila is one of Metro Manila's integrated casino resort and hotel complex

Tourism is a vital industry of the region. Metro Manila is the main gateway to the Philippines. Trade and tourism represent 31.4% of share of NCR's output by industry according to Brookings Institution. Metro Manila welcomed 974,379 overnight visitors in 2012, making it the top overnight tourist destination of the country. Manila is visited by the majority of international tourists coming to the country registering a total of 3,139,756 arrivals in 2012.

Metro Manila has opened 4,612 hotel rooms in 2015. It is also expected to exceed the 3,500 annual addition of hotel rooms in the next two years. Gambling in Metro Manila has also become a popular tourist attraction in the region. Metro Manila is a popular gaming destination in Asia, rivaling other major gaming destinations such as Macau and Singapore. There are around 20 casinos in the metropolis, featuring luxurious casino hotels and integrated resorts. Its thriving local gambling market makes Manila attractive to casino operators. Popular gaming destinations are Newport World Resorts in Newport City in Pasay, Solaire Resort & Casino, City of Dreams Manila, Okada Manila, Westside City Resorts World, and NayonLanding in Entertainment City in Bay City, Parañaque.

Intramuros is the historic walled area within the modern City of Manila. Originally, it was considered to be Manila itself at the time when the Philippines was under the Spanish Empire colonial rule. Owing to its history and cultural value, Intramuros and Rizal Park were designated as flagship destination to become a tourism enterprise zone in the Tourism Act of 2009. Intramuros is managed by the Intramuros Administration.

The architecture of Intramuros reflects the Spanish colonial style and the American neoclassical architectural style, since the Philippines was a colony of Spain and the United States before it was granted its independence in 1946. Kalesa is a popular mode of transportation in Intramuros and nearby places such as Binondo, Ermita and the Rizal Park.

Popular tourist destinations in Intramuros include the Baluarte de San Diego, Club Intramuros Golf Course, Cuartel de Santa Lucia, Fort Santiago, Manila Cathedral, Palacio Arzobispal, Palacio de Santa Potenciana, Palacio del Gobernador, Plaza Mexico, Plaza de Roma, San Agustin Church and its newest tourist attraction, the Ayuntamiento de Manila.

== Infrastructure ==
=== Transportation ===
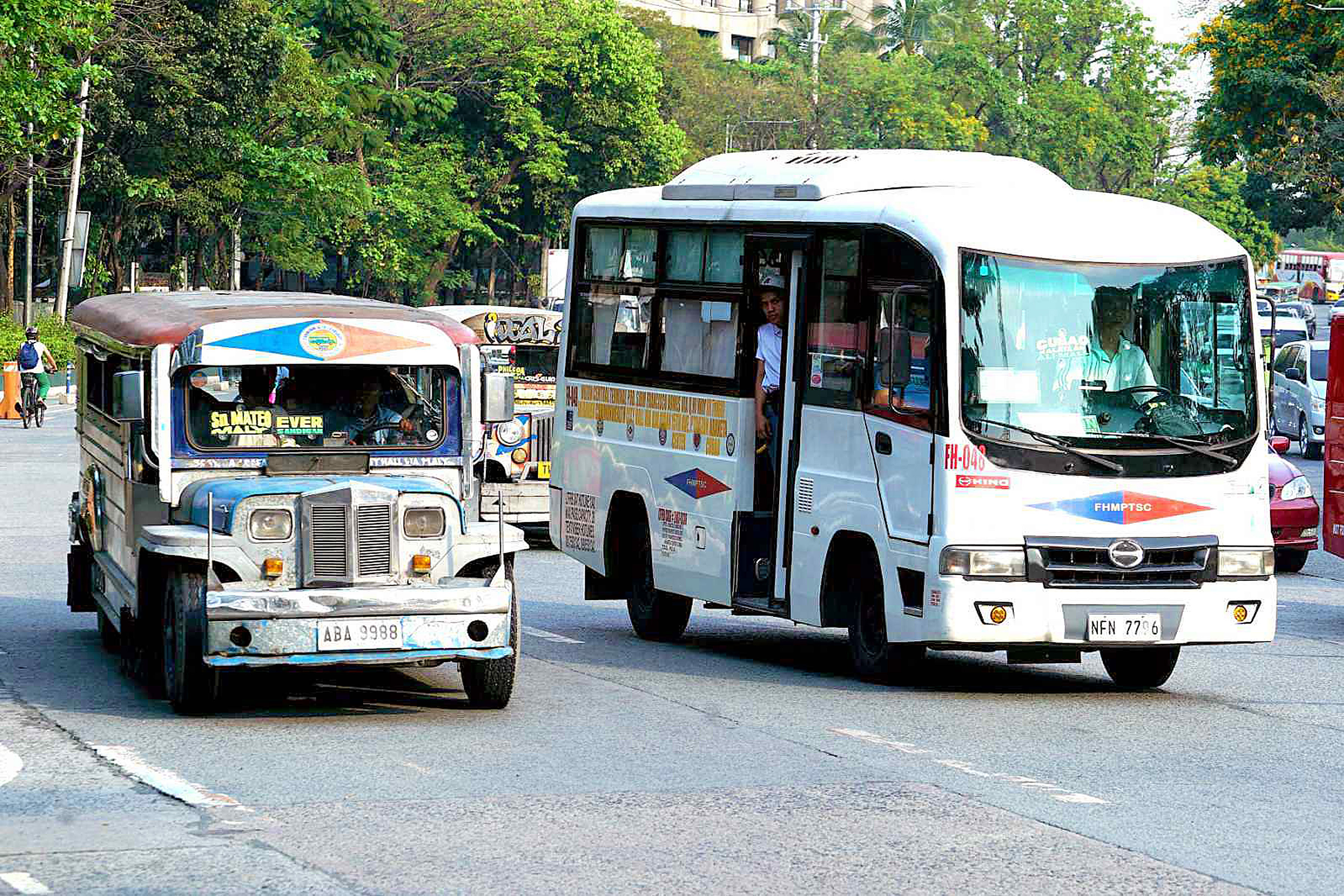
A traditional jeepney (left) and modern jeepney (right) in Quezon City

According to the Land Transportation Franchising and Regulatory Board, public ridership in Metro Manila composes of the following: 46% of the people go around by jeepneys, 32% by private vehicle, 14% by bus, and 8% use the railway system. Transportation development in Metro Manila follows the Metro Manila Dream Plan, which consists of building short-term to long-term infrastructure lasting up to 2030 and addressing its issues on traffic, land use and environment.

The Metropolitan Manila Development Authority (MMDA) has exclusive authority to enforce traffic laws, rules and regulations, and that the local government units in Metro Manila may participate only when their own traffic enforcers are deputized by the agency. Furthermore, MMDA has traffic jurisdiction over Metro Manila's ten radial roads, five circumferential roads and other roads it may include to enforce traffic laws and traffic management activities. However, the MMDA has route designations for radial roads and circumferential roads different from the route classifications of the Department of Public Works and Highways due to the MMDA's focus on only major roads and thoroughfares.

==== Roads and highways ====
DPWH map of Circumferential and Radial Roads in Metro Manila

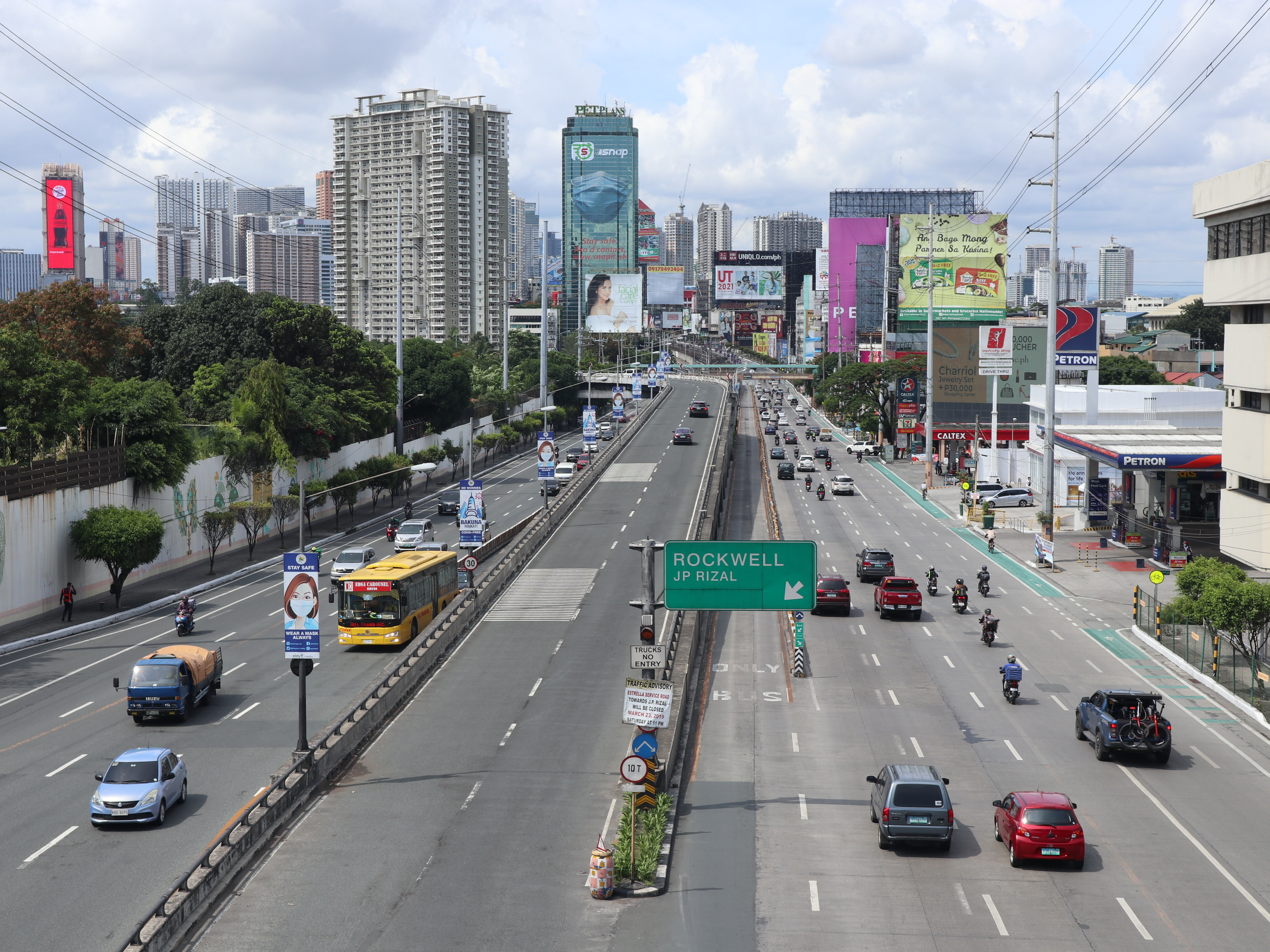
Estrella Flyover at EDSA in Makati

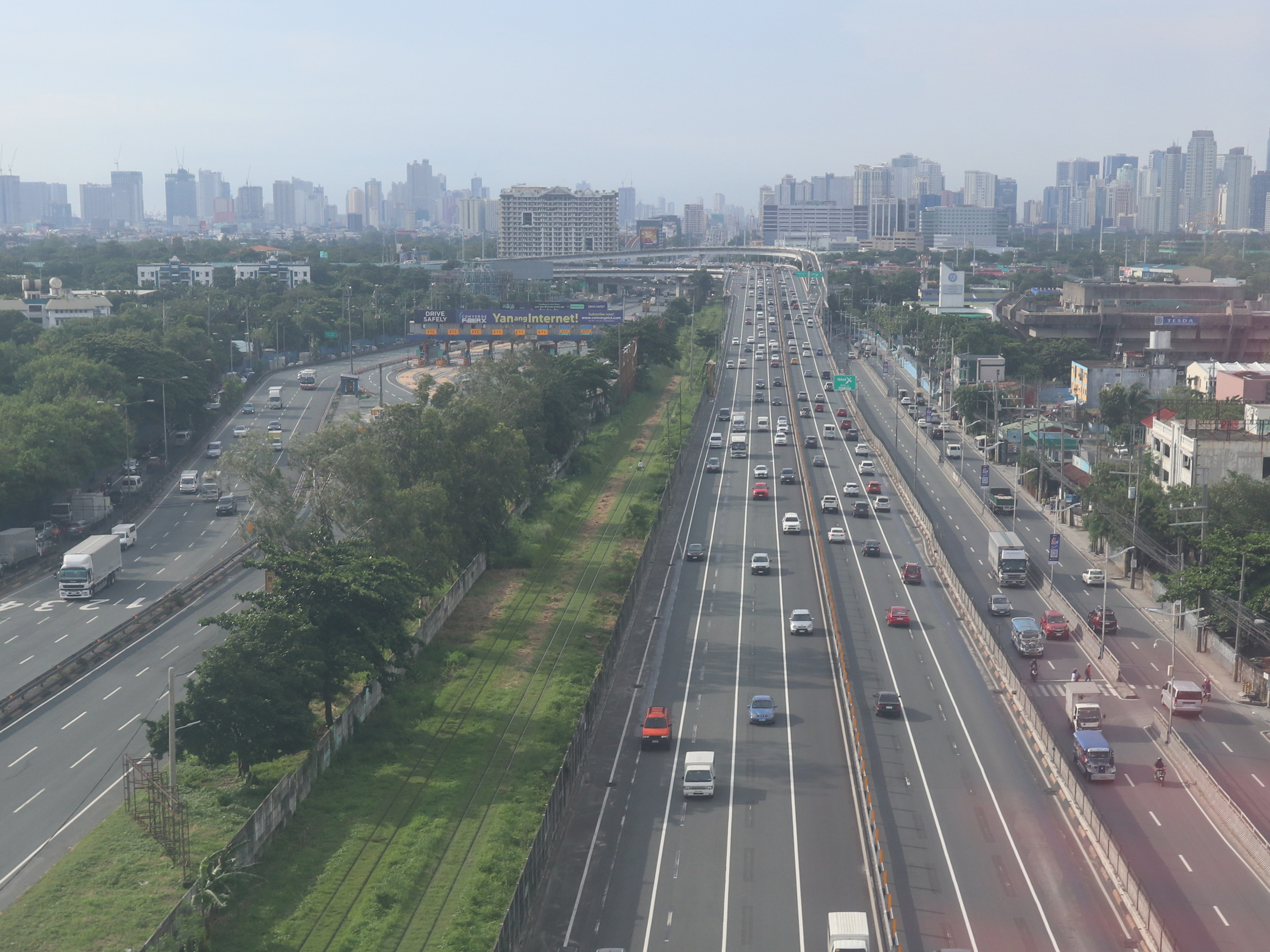
Skyway (center), South Luzon Expressway (left) and the East Service Road (right)

The roads of Metro Manila are built around the City of Manila. Roads are classified as local, national or subdivision roads. There are ten radial roads branching out from the city. Also there are five circumferential roads forming a series of concentric semi-circular arcs around Manila. The circumferential and radial roads are systems of interconnected roads, bridges and highways. A problem with the circumferential roads are the missing road links. These are the roads that are not yet constructed to give way for development due to Metro Manila's rapid urbanization. The metropolis is resolving this problem through the completion of missing road links or through the construction of connector roads. The radial and circumferential road system are being supplanted by a new numbered highway system implemented by the Department of Public Works and Highways, and new signage are being placed with its implementation. Expressways are being assigned numbers with the E prefix. National roads are assigned 1 to 3 digit numbers, except for those classified as tertiary national roads.

An important circumferential road is the Circumferential Road 4, with the Epifanio de los Santos Avenue as its major component. It traverses the cities of Pasay, Makati, Mandaluyong, Quezon City and Caloocan. Line 3 follows the alignment of EDSA, from Taft Avenue in Pasay up to TriNoma, terminating before it reaches Caloocan. Circumferential Road 5 serves the people near the regional limits of Metro Manila and also serves as an alternate route for Circumferential Road 4.

Prominent radial roads include the Radial Road 1, composed of Roxas Boulevard and the Manila–Cavite Expressway (Coastal Road) that connects Metro Manila to Cavite, Radial Road 3 or the South Luzon Expressway that connects Metro Manila to Laguna, Radial Road 6, composed of Aurora Boulevard and Marcos Highway that runs up to Rizal and Radial Road 8 or the North Luzon Expressway that serves as the gateway to the north.

The Skyway serves as the region's main expressway, directly connecting the North Luzon Expressway and the South Luzon Expressway. It also enables access to Ninoy Aquino International Airport via the NAIA Expressway (NAIAX). The Skyway is the first fully grade-separated highway in the Philippines and one of the longest elevated highways in the world with a total length of approximately 42.79 kilometers (26.59 mi). Other expressways such as the Manila-Cavite Expressway and Muntinlupa–Cavite Expressway also connect Metro Manila to its surrounding areas.

In 2014, the Metro Manila Dream Plan was formulated. Road infrastructure projects based from the plan that were completed are the EDSA rehabilitation, CAVITEX–C-5 Link, NLEX Connector, and the Santa Monica–Lawton Bridge.

==== Rail ====
System map of the Metro Manila railway system.

Rail transportation in the Greater Manila Area is a major part of the transportation system in Metro Manila and its surrounding areas. It consists of the Manila Light Rail Transit System, Manila Metro Rail Transit System, and the PNR Metro Commuter Line. As of 2021, the three systems and its four operational lines combined has 82 stations, covering a total of 113.3 km (70.4 mi). The network makes up the majority of active railways in the country and bear the brunt of providing the metropolis with rail as a faster alternative mode of transport other than buses and jeepneys. However, these systems are currently insufficient for the rapidly expanding metropolis; to address this, new lines and line extensions are under construction, which will extend the system far out into neighboring regions.

Several new railway projects are being undertaken by the national government and the private sector. These include the North–South Commuter Railway, the Metro Manila Subway, and MRT Line 7, all of which are under construction. Line extensions such as the LRT Line 1 Cavite extension and the LRT Line 2 West extension are in the pipeline. The proposed MRT Line 4 was also planned. Other line extensions and railway lines are in the planning stage.

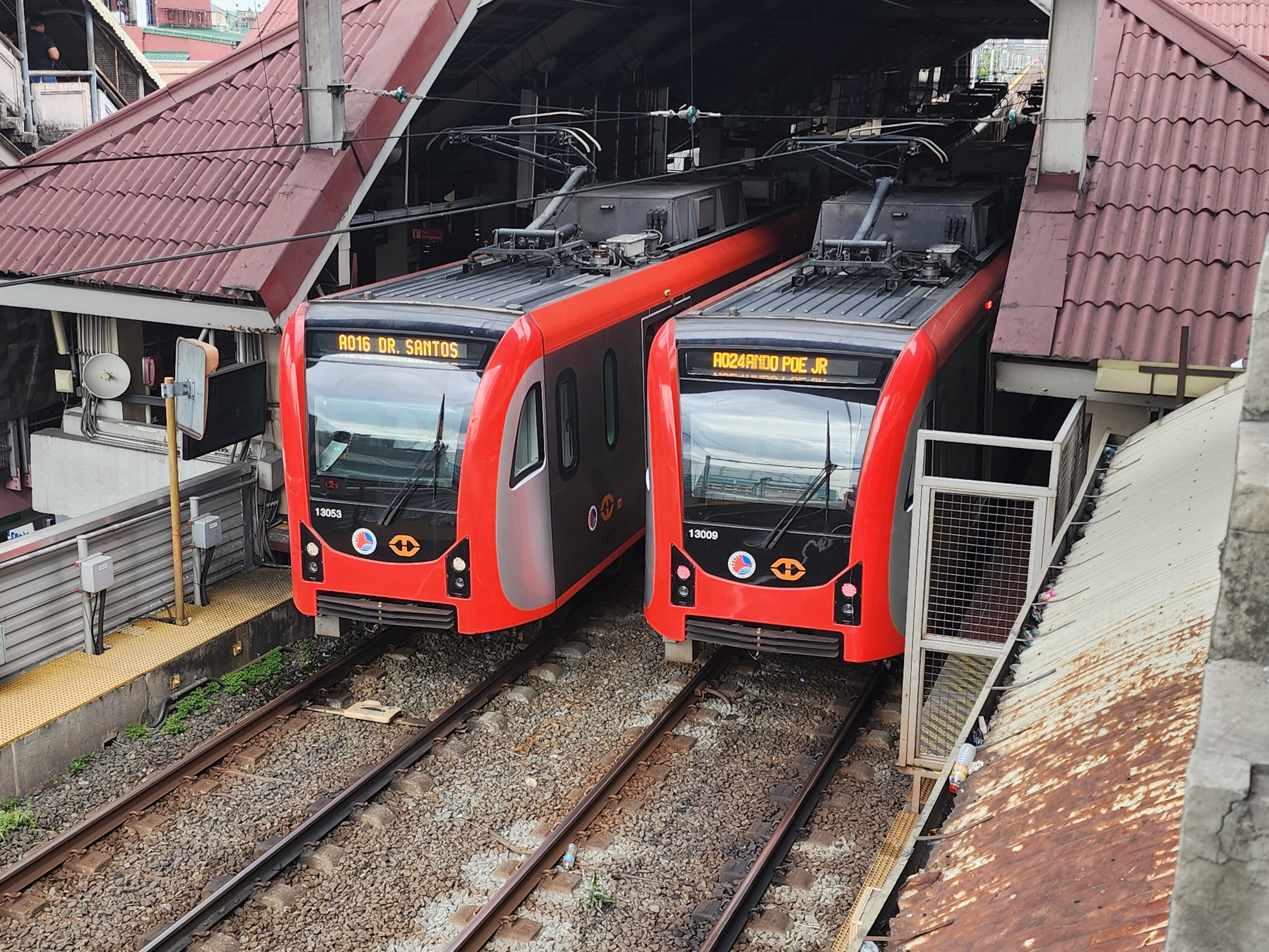
LRT Line 1

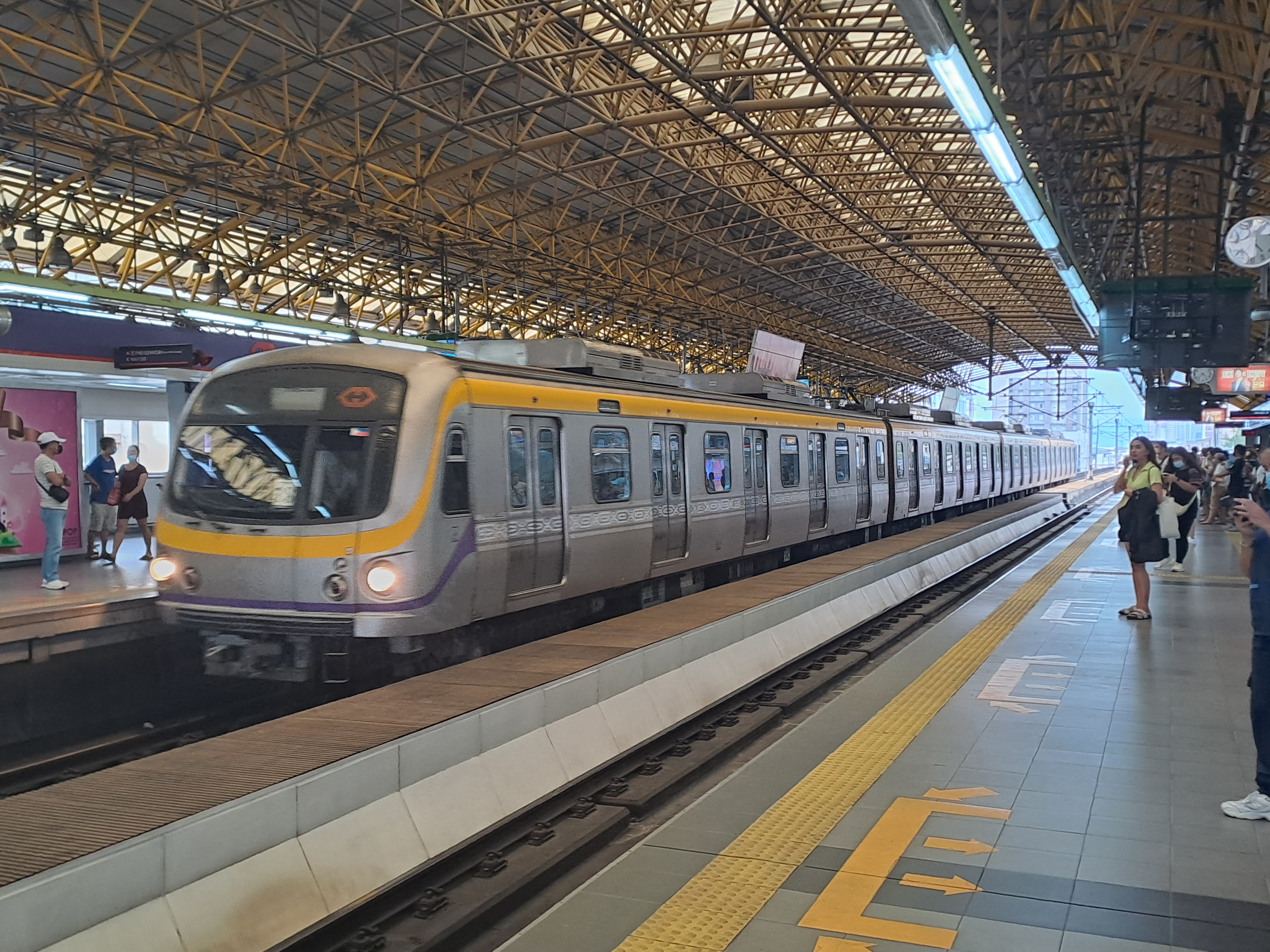
LRT Line 2

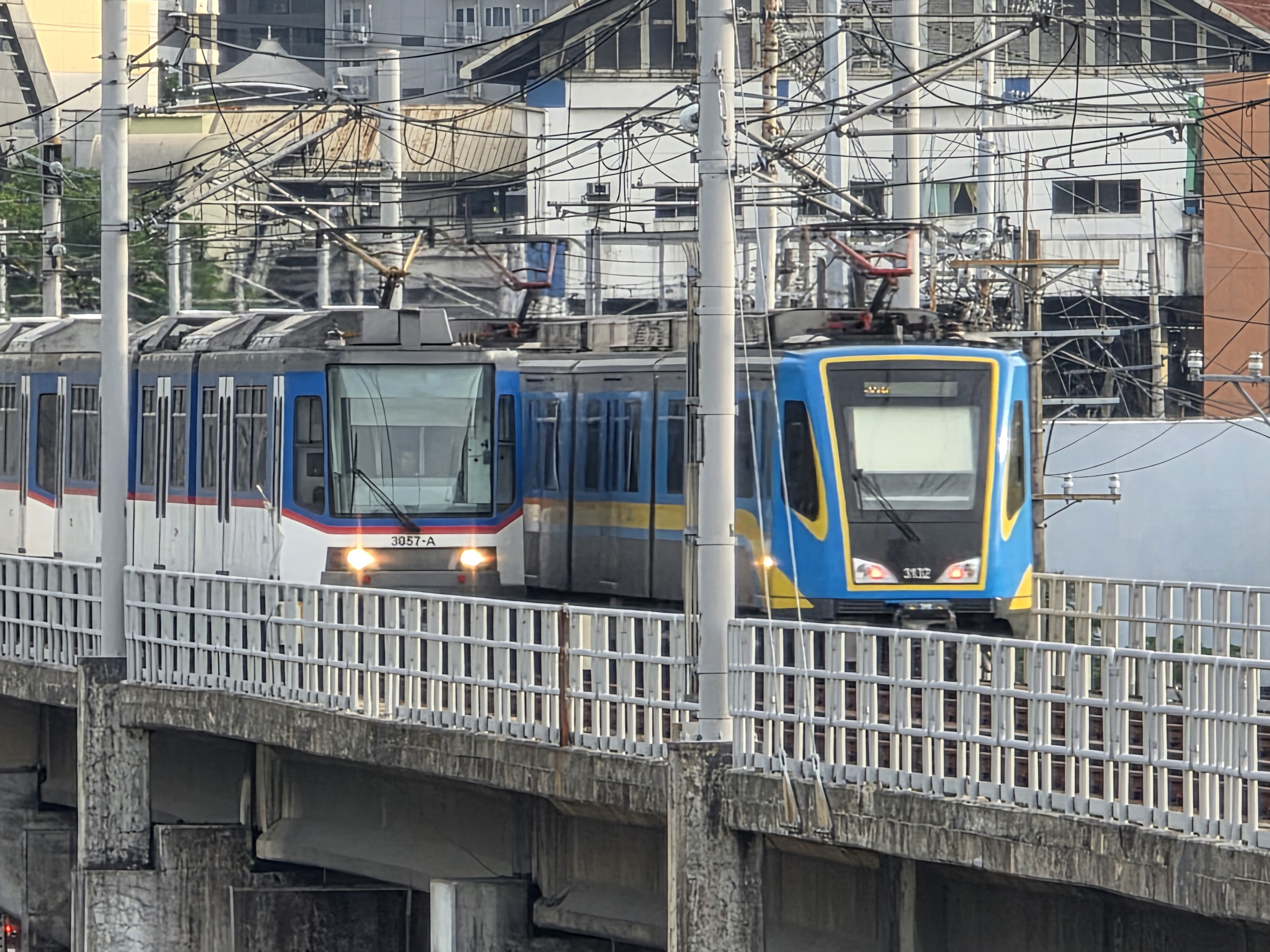
MRT Line 3

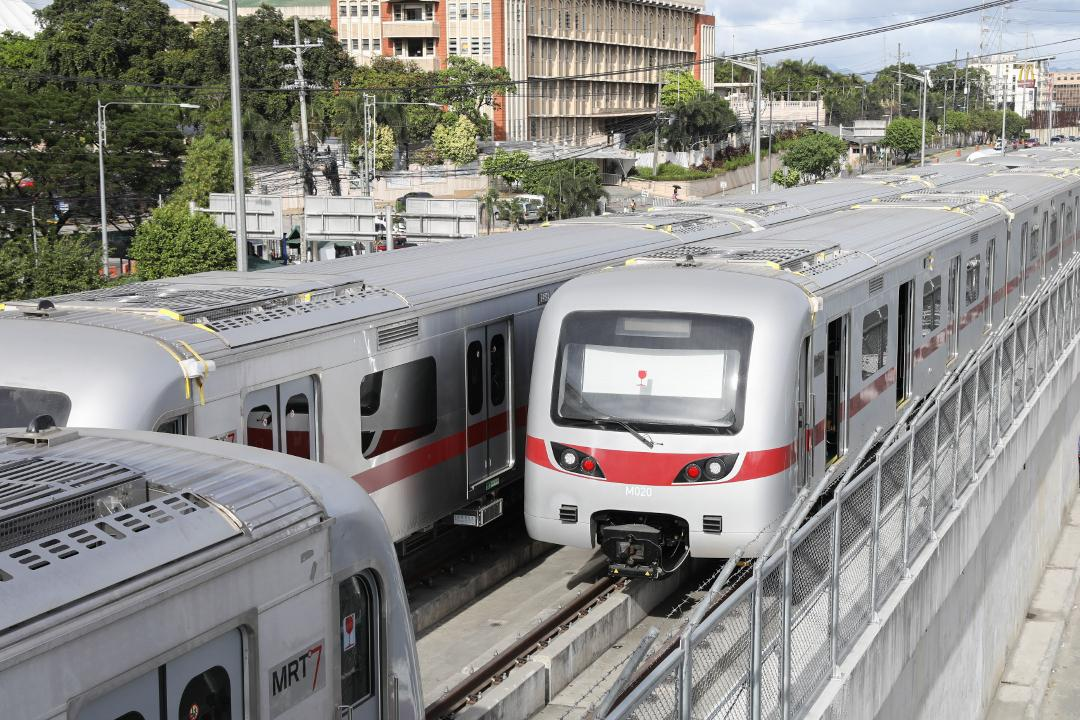
MRT Line 7

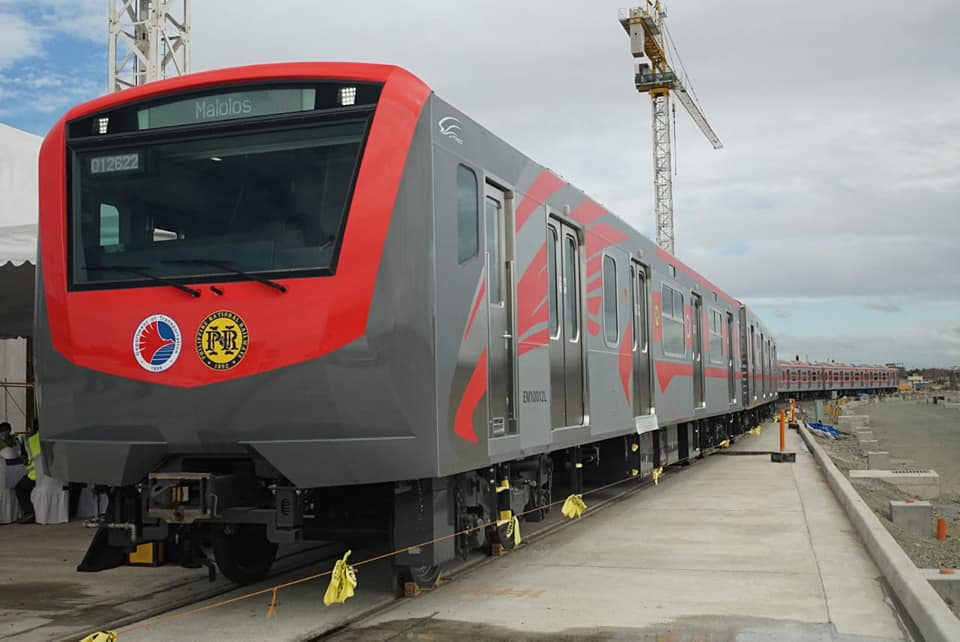
PNR North–South Commuter Railway

==== Aviation ====
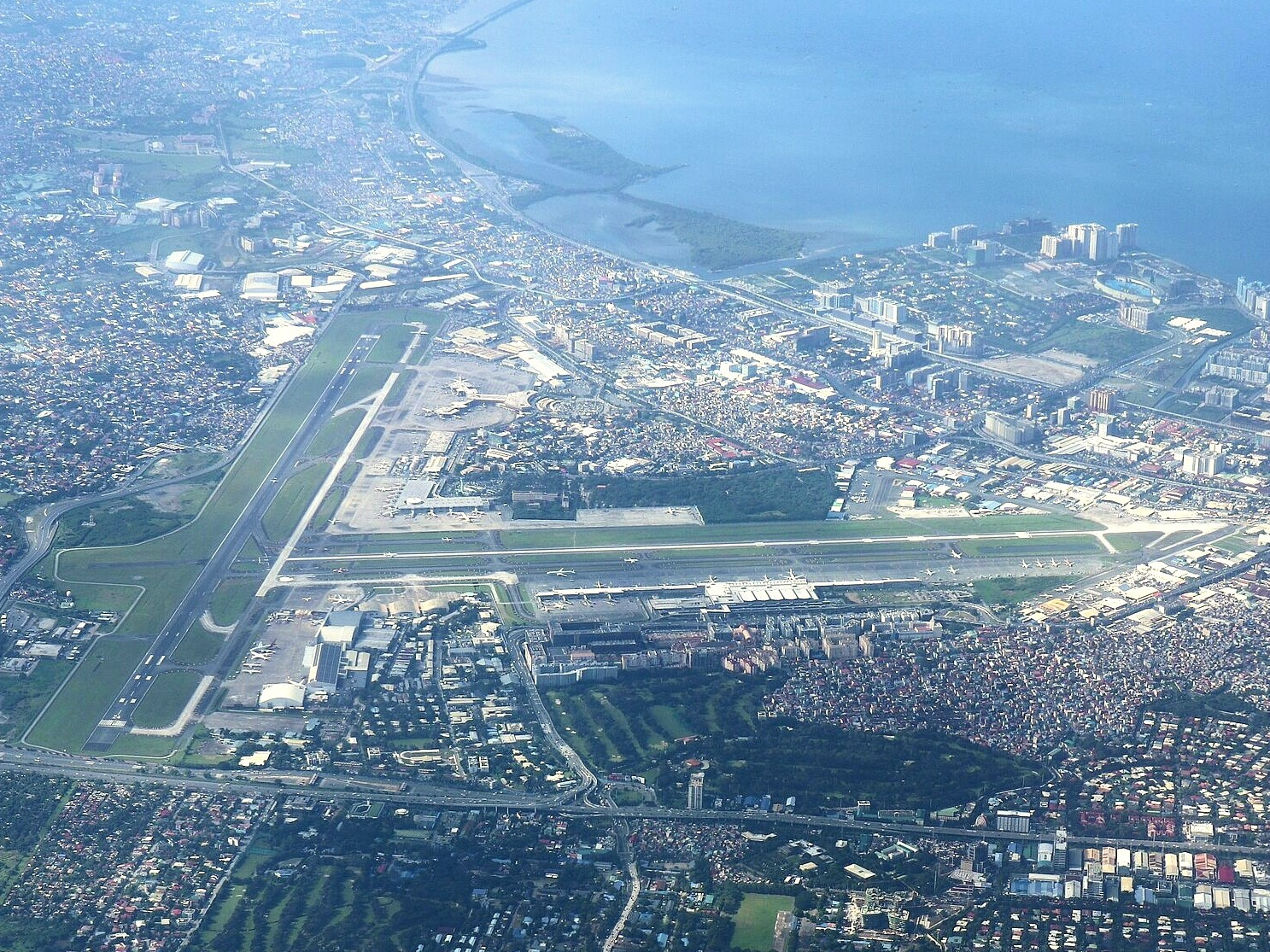
Aerial view of the Ninoy Aquino International Airport

Metro Manila is served by the Ninoy Aquino International Airport, the primary airport serving the region and nearby provinces since the 1950s. It is located within the cities of Pasay and Parañaque, and is the busiest airport in the Philippines. NAIA has four terminals: Terminal 1, Terminal 2 (which is exclusively used by Philippine Airlines), Terminal 3, and Terminal 4 (domestic terminal). However, underinvestment by the Philippine government has resulted in the airport being congested and overcrowded, as it cannot keep up with the rapid growth of the metropolis. As a result, the Clark International Airport in Angeles City which is located 80 kilometers (50 mi) away was designated as the secondary airport serving the region. Clark is connected to Metro Manila by the North–South Commuter Railway.

In the 2020s, the New Manila International Airport started its construction in Bulakan, Bulacan, which is situated 35 km (22 mi) north of Manila. It aims to decongest and replace the Ninoy Aquino International Airport as the primary airport of the Greater Manila Area.

==== Buses ====
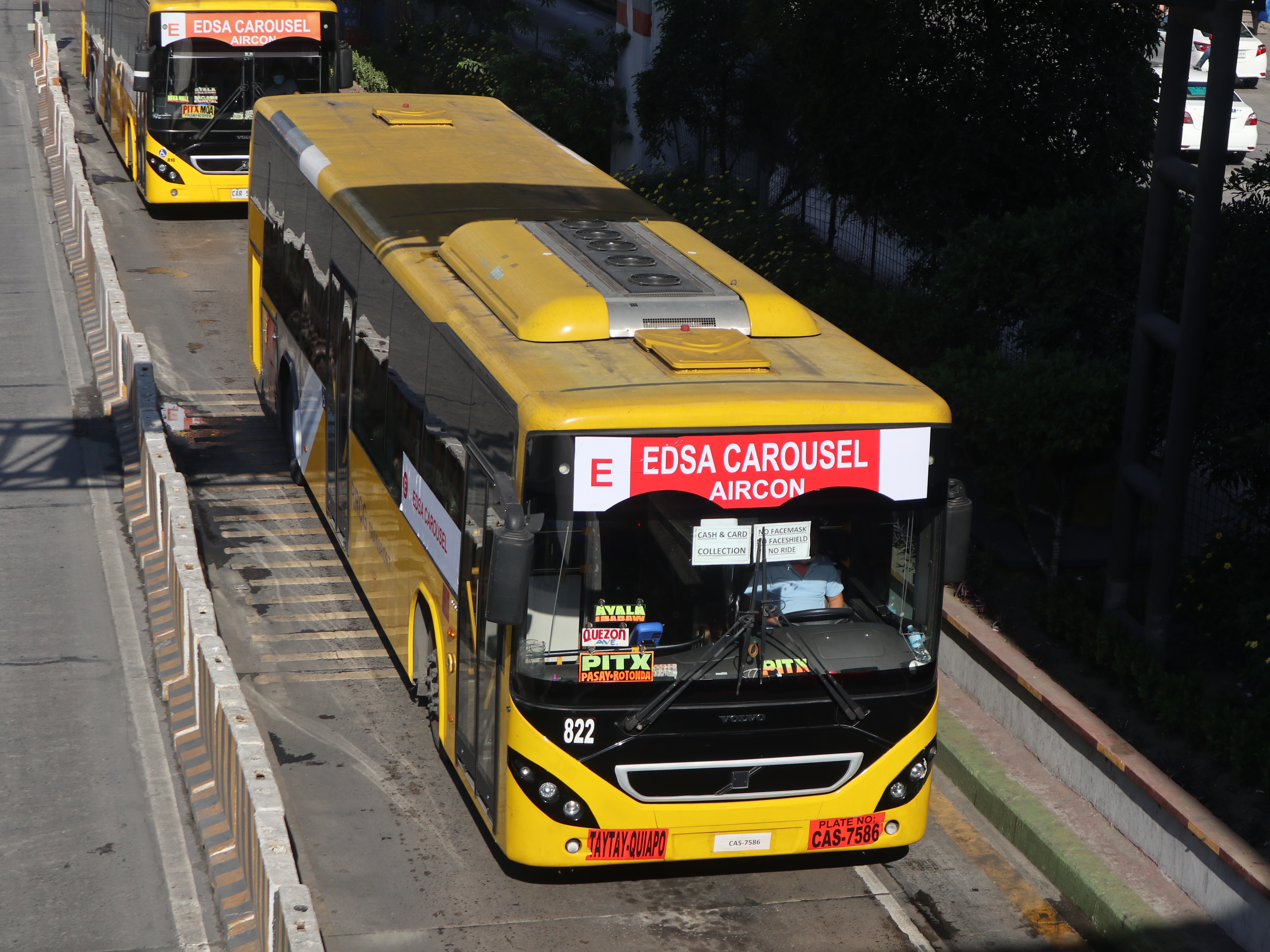
EDSA Carousel

Bus franchises in the region are regulated by the Land Transportation Franchising and Regulatory Board. The Premium Point-to-Point Bus Service is the express bus system that runs from its dispatch terminal in Fairview up to the central business districts along EDSA. It aims to cut travel time substantially and provide a faster, safer and more convenient bus service to commuters, who are usually caught at the heavy traffic across the metropolis. A second express bus link from SM North EDSA, Trinoma and SM Megamall to Makati opened in December 2015, and by January 2016 was the line on which, for the first time in nearly three decades, a double-decker bus traveled on EDSA, to the delight of motorists, followed by a third link, this time from Robinsons Galleria to the Ayala Center complex in February 2016 and a fourth in March linking the Ayala Center to the Alabang Town Center in Muntinlupa via the Metro Manila Skyway (and later to Ayala Malls South Park). As of the present express buses also link the Market Market mall and Circuit Makati to both the Nuvali residential township and the Pacita Village complex in San Pedro, both in Laguna, in services launched in 2014 and 2017, respectively (plus additional services to the UP Town Mall in Quezon City and SM Masinag in Antipolo, Rizal), while intercity express buses have been in operation since 2015 to alleviate traffic on EDSA. In 2018, additional services from the Makati CBD and from San Lorenzo Place up to Cavite debuted.

Metro Manila has a bus rapid transit (BRT) system, particularly the EDSA Carousel. Another BRT system will traverse for 27.7 kilometers (17.2 mi) from Commonwealth Avenue up to the Manila City Hall. The planned BRT system costs ₱4.9 billion ($109.5 million) and will have a fleet of 300 buses and 32 stations.

==== Ferry ====
The Pasig River Ferry Service run by the Metropolitan Manila Development Authority is the principal ferry shuttle system of Metro Manila. It traverses the Pasig River from Barangay Pinagbuhatan in Pasig to Plaza Mexico in Intramuros. Although it was referred to as a ferry, it is more akin to a water bus. It has 17 stations, but only 14 are operational. Another ferry route called the Manila-Bataan Ferry was launched on May 10, 2017, and traverses Manila Bay from the Bay Terminal at CCP Complex in Manila to Orion, Bataan. A new ferry route known as the Cavite-Manila Ferry Service that runs between Noveleta, Cavite and Intramuros was launched in January 2018.

=== Electricity and water ===
Water zones for Metro Manila and the surrounding areas. Maynilad Water Services operates in the red areas while Manila Water operates in the blue areas.

Meralco is the sole electric distributor of Metro Manila. It generates its power from the National Power Corporation and other independent power producers in Luzon. The Metropolitan Waterworks and Sewerage System (MWSS) was responsible for the supply and delivery of potable water and the sewerage system in Metro Manila. It was privatized in 1997 and the region and its immediate surrounding areas were split into the east and west concession. The winning corporations provide the same function of MWSS.

The Maynilad Water Services took over the west zone, which is composed of Manila (excluding the southeastern part of the city), Caloocan, Las Piñas, Malabon, Muntinlupa, Navotas, Parañaque, Pasay and Valenzuela. It also operates in some parts of Makati and Quezon City. Manila Water operates on the east zone, comprising the cities of Mandaluyong, Marikina, Pasig, Pateros, San Juan and Taguig. It also operates in large areas of Makati and Quezon City and the southeastern part of Manila, which was excluded from the west zone.

=== Waste management ===
The Metro Manila Development Authority and the local government units of Metro Manila have shared responsibilities for the waste management and disposal of the metropolis. For garbage hauling, the region spent ₱8.5 billion ($93.855 million) in 2024. In 2013, Quezon City spent the most at ₱994.59 million ($22.115 million) while Pateros, the region's only municipality, spent the least money on garbage at ₱9.478 million ($210,747).

== Human resources ==
=== Education ===
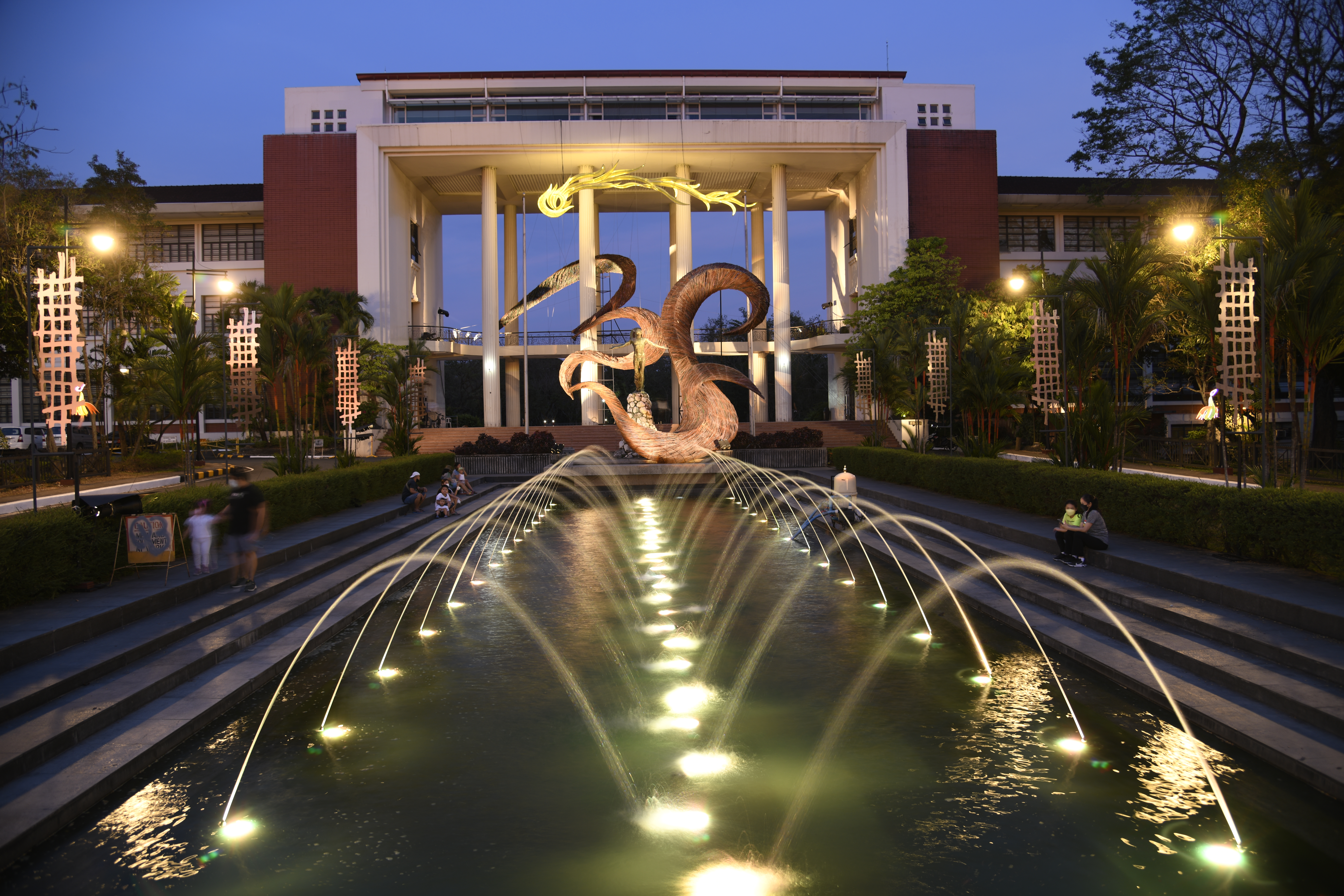
University of the Philippines Diliman is the flagship university of the University of the Philippines System since 1949

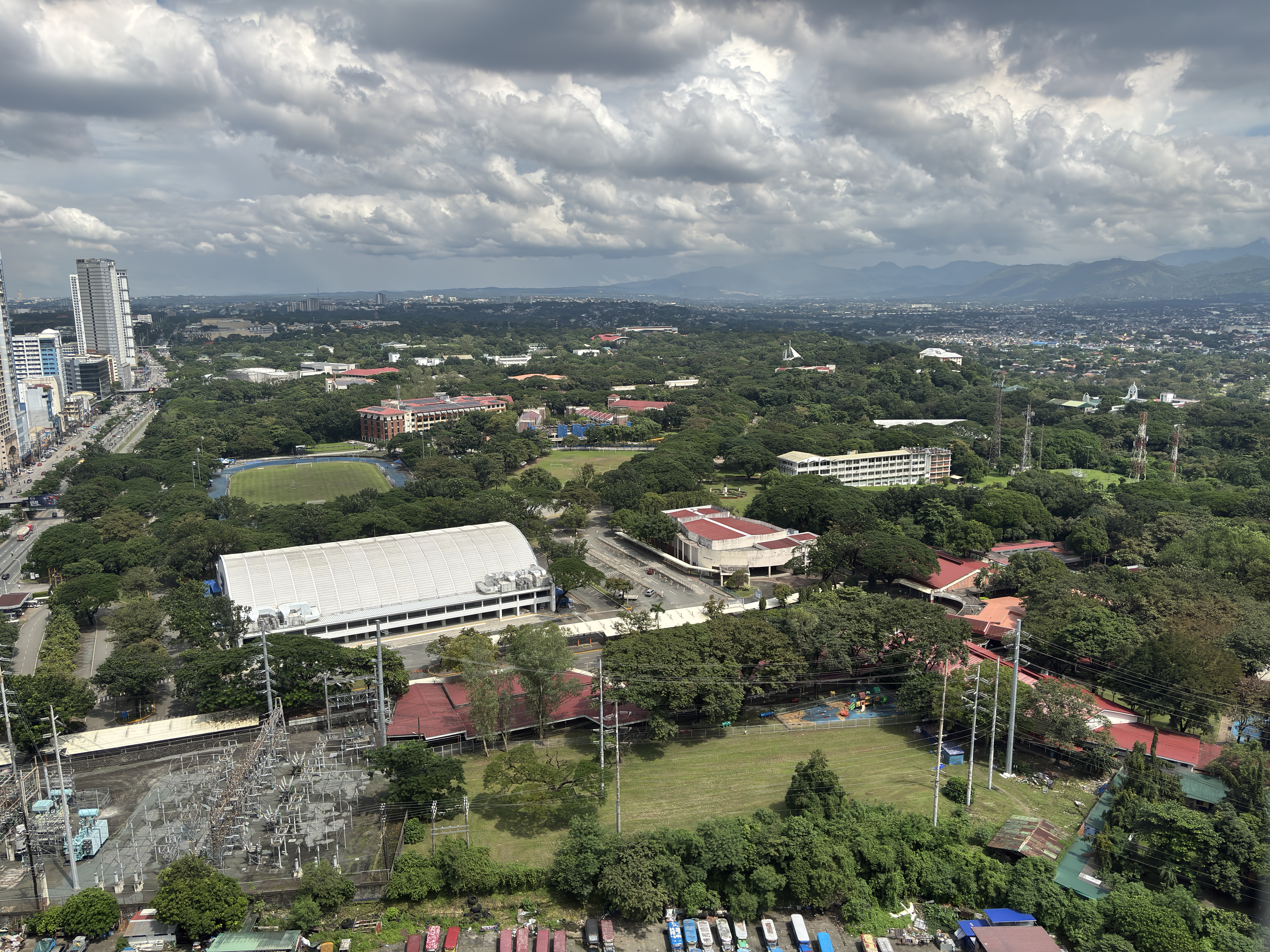
Ateneo de Manila, Quezon City

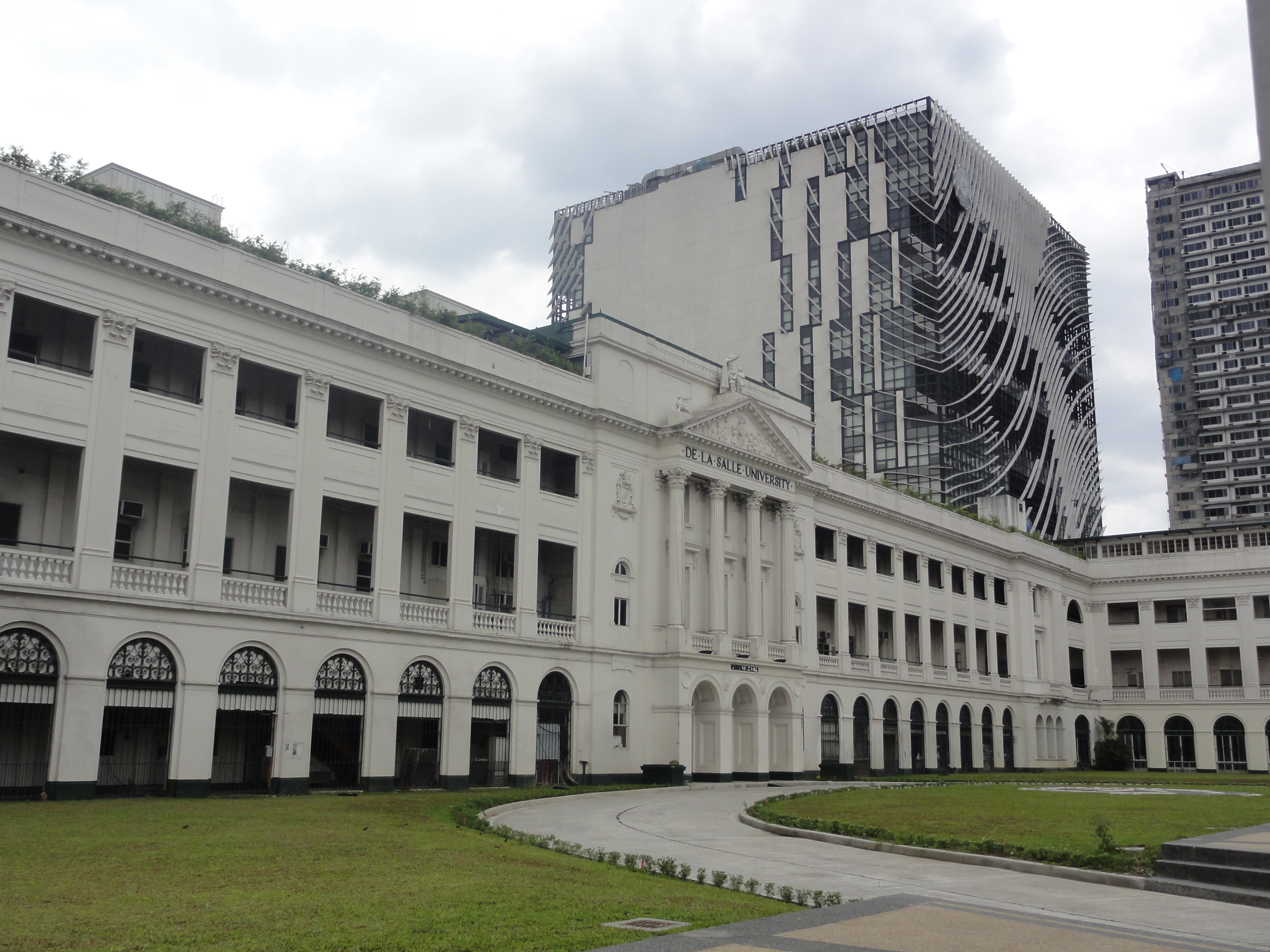
De La Salle University, Manila

Since the Spanish colonial period, Manila has been the center of education. The country's top ranked universities, colloquially known as the "Big Four", located in Metro Manila, are the University of the Philippines System, Ateneo de Manila University, De La Salle University, and University of Santo Tomas. The University of Santo Tomas (1611), Colegio de San Juan de Letran (1620) and Ateneo de Manila University (1859) are some of the oldest educational institutions that was established during the colonial period. The University of the Philippines (Diliman and Manila constituent units), along with seven other State Universities and Colleges (SUC), namely the Eulogio "Amang" Rodriguez Institute of Science and Technology, Marikina Polytechnic College, Philippine Normal University, Philippine State College of Aeronautics, Polytechnic University of the Philippines, Rizal Technological University and the Technological University of the Philippines, are based in Metro Manila. Manila's University Belt form the largest concentration of higher education institutes in the Philippines, making Manila the center for higher learning in the country.

Primary and secondary education is in the region is governed by the Department of Education-National Capital Region (DepEd-NCR). Meanwhile, the higher educational institutions are under the CHED-National Capital Region. Notable secondary schools in Metro Manila include the Philippine Science High School in Quezon City, the national science school of the Philippines, and the Manila Science High School in Manila, the forerunner of all the science schools in the country. The Makati Science High School, which is formerly administered by Makati, is now under the management and administration of Taguig, following the resolution of the territorial dispute between the two cities which places the school under the territory of Taguig.

The region has the highest literacy rate among all the regions of the Philippines, with 99.2% in 2008. Literacy rate for males is at 99.0% while literacy rate for females is at 99.4%. Metro Manila has 516 public elementary schools and 456 public junior and senior high schools. It is complemented by 1,982 private pre-schools, 2,122 private elementary schools, 965 private junior high schools and 721 private senior high schools serving more than 2.8 million students in the region. As of 2009, There are 309 tertiary (public and private) institutions as of the year-end of 2009. For the said school year, enrollment in public elementary schools is at 1,219,333, public secondary schools at 661,019 and 687,096 for tertiary (public and private) institutions.

=== Public health ===
St. Luke's Medical Center – Global City in Taguig is named as one of the best hospitals in the world

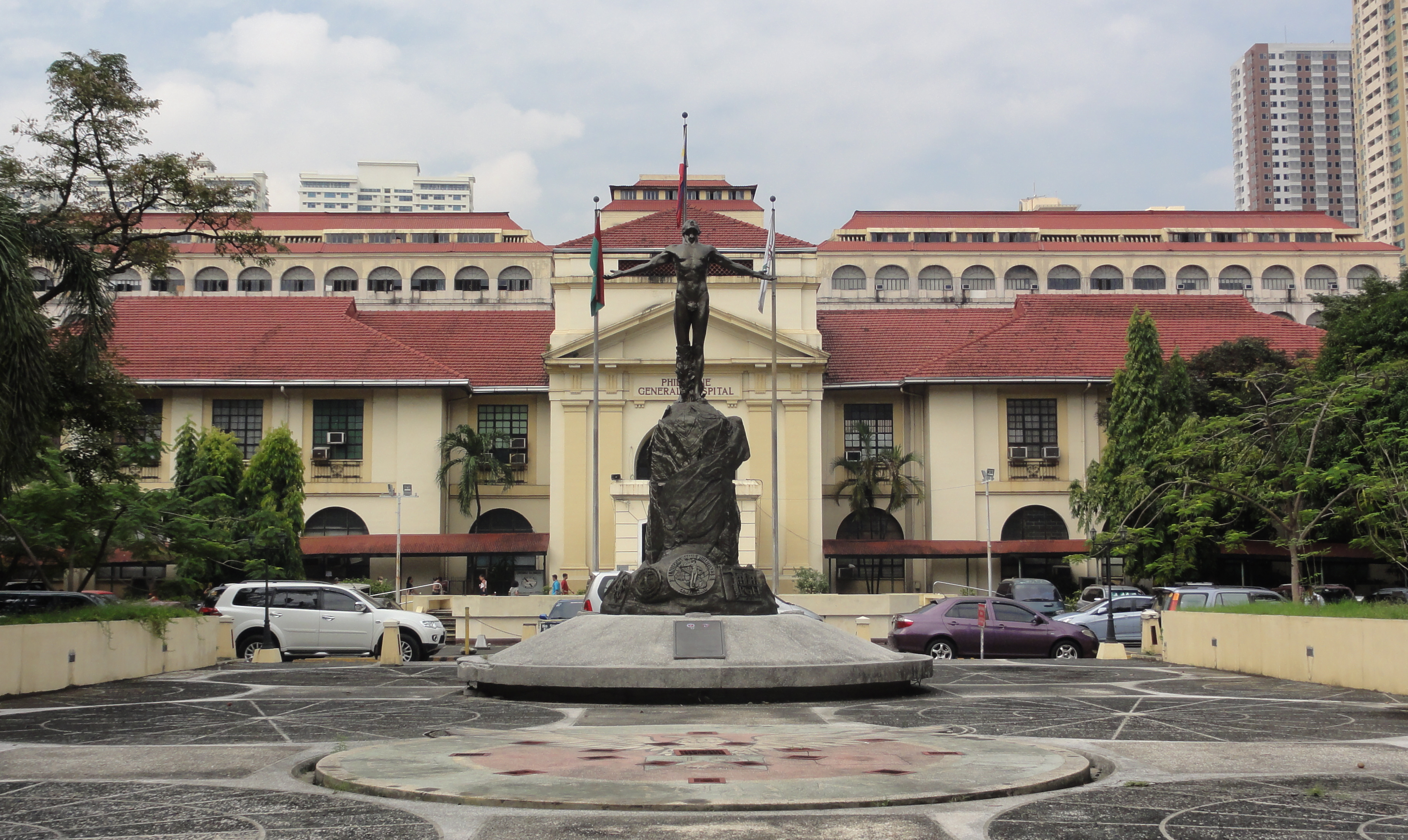
Philippine General Hospital in Ermita, Manila.

Healthcare in Metro Manila is mostly provided by private corporations. 72% of region's hospitals are privately owned. As of 2009, the region has 179 hospitals. Quezon City has the most hospitals while Pateros does not have any. In 2008, government health workers in NCR comprises 590 doctors, 498 dentists, 4,576 nurses, and 17,437 midwives. Furthermore, Metro Manila has 27,779 beds with a ratio of 2.47 per 1,000 population as of 2008. The region has the lowest malnutrition rate among all the regions in the country.

The headquarters of the World Health Organization Regional Office for the Western Pacific, and the World Health Organization Country Office for the Philippines are in the region. The main office of the Department of Health, the national health department, is also in the region.

Metro Manila is designated by the Department of Health as the pioneer of medical tourism, expecting it to generate $1 billion in revenue annually. However, lack of progressive health system, inadequate infrastructure and the unstable political environment are seen as hindrances for its growth. Under the Philippine Medical Tourism Program, there are 16 participating hospitals (private and public) in Metro Manila with a total number of 6,748 beds as of 2013. Five out of six hospitals in the country accredited by the Joint Commission International are in the region, these are the Asian Hospital and Medical Center, Makati Medical Center, St. Luke's Medical Center – Global City, St. Luke's Medical Center – Quezon City and The Medical City.

East Avenue in Quezon City is the location of prominent national health centers: the Lung Center of the Philippines, National Kidney and Transplant Institute, and the Philippine Heart Center. Other national special hospital in Metro Manila include the Philippine Orthopedic Center in Quezon City, and the National Center for Mental Health in Mandaluyong. The Philippine General Hospital, the country's premier state-owned tertiary hospital is located at the City of Manila and it is managed by the University of the Philippines Manila. The Research Institute for Tropical Medicine is a hospital and health research facility located in Muntinlupa. The St. Luke's Medical Center which operates in Quezon City and Taguig, is a private tertiary referral hospital cited as one of the best hospitals in the world.

=== Public safety ===
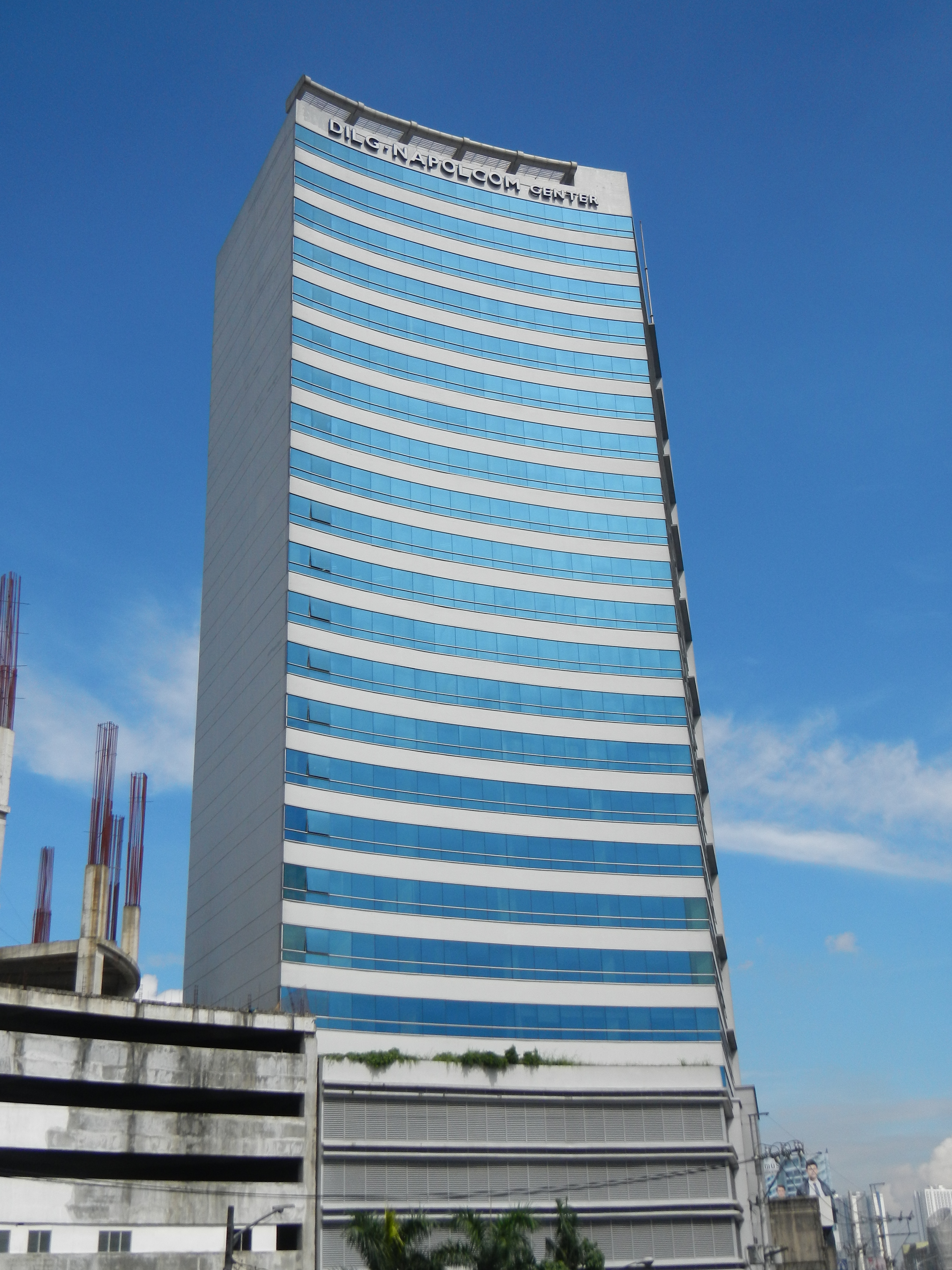
The DILG–NAPOLCOM Center is the headquarters of the Department of the Interior and Local Government and its attached agency, the National Police Commission which administers and maintains operational supervision of the Philippine National Police.

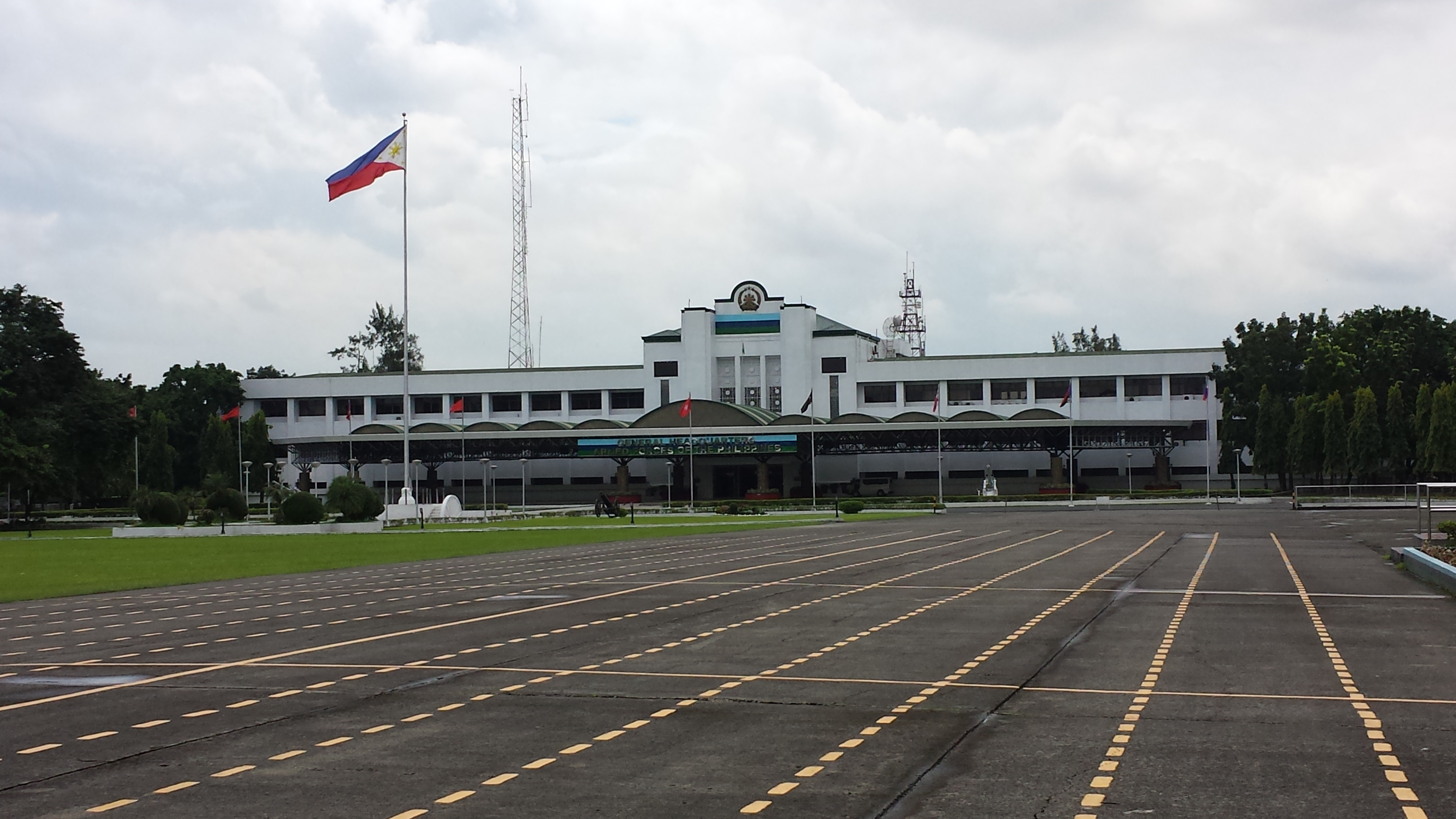
Camp Aguinaldo is the headquarters of the Armed Forces of the Philippines

The Philippine National Police is responsible for law enforcement in the country. Its headquarters is located at Camp Crame along Bonny Serrano Avenue, Quezon City. The National Capital Region Police Office (NCRPO) is the regional branch of PNP that operates in the region. Its headquarters is located at Camp Bagong Diwa in Bicutan, Taguig. Under the supervision of NCRPO, Metro Manila is divided into five police districts. The five police districts are the Northern Police District, Eastern Police District, Southern Police District and Quezon City Police District.

Metro Manila has the highest rate of crime in the country in 2014, with 59,448 crimes reported (excluding crimes reported in barangay level) with 25,353 of these crimes committed against persons. Following criticisms of high crime rate in Metro Manila, the Philippine National Police launched a relentless anti-crime drive that resulted in the decrease of crimes in the metropolis. As of March 2015 Metro Manila's crime rate is down by 50%. From an average of 919 crimes reported weekly, it has gone down to 412. Recorded robberies and theft also decreased by 63 in just a month. All the 159 police community precincts of Metro Manila will be using the electronic blotter system in recording crimes starting June 2015.

The Bureau of Fire Protection National Capital Region provides fire protection and technical rescue as well as emergency medical services to the metropolis. It is broadly organized into five firefighting districts: Manila, Quezon City, District II, District III and District IV.

The headquarters of the Armed Forces of the Philippines is located at Camp Aguinaldo, along with the Department of National Defense, in Murphy, Quezon City. Aside from Camp Aguinaldo, other military bases situated in the region are Camp Atienza and Fort Bonifacio. The Philippine Army has their headquarters at Fort Bonifacio, Taguig. The Villamor Air Base in Ninoy Aquino International Airport is the home to the headquarters of the Philippine Air Force while the headquarters of the Philippine Navy is located at Roxas Boulevard, Malate, Manila.

The Philippine Coast Guard is headquartered at Port Area (Manila South Harbor), City of Manila. Its Coast Guard NCR District also has its headquarters in the city and has another Coast Guard Station in Pasig. It also has a base in Taguig and maintains several detachments located in Navotas, Parañaque, Tangos, Vitas, Manila North Harbor, Manila South Harbor and the Cultural Center of the Philippines.

In 2012, the AFP Joint Task Force-National Capital Region was launched to ensure peace and stability in Metro Manila, bearing the same function of the deactivated National Capital Regional Command, although it operates on a much smaller size than its predecessor.

== Culture ==
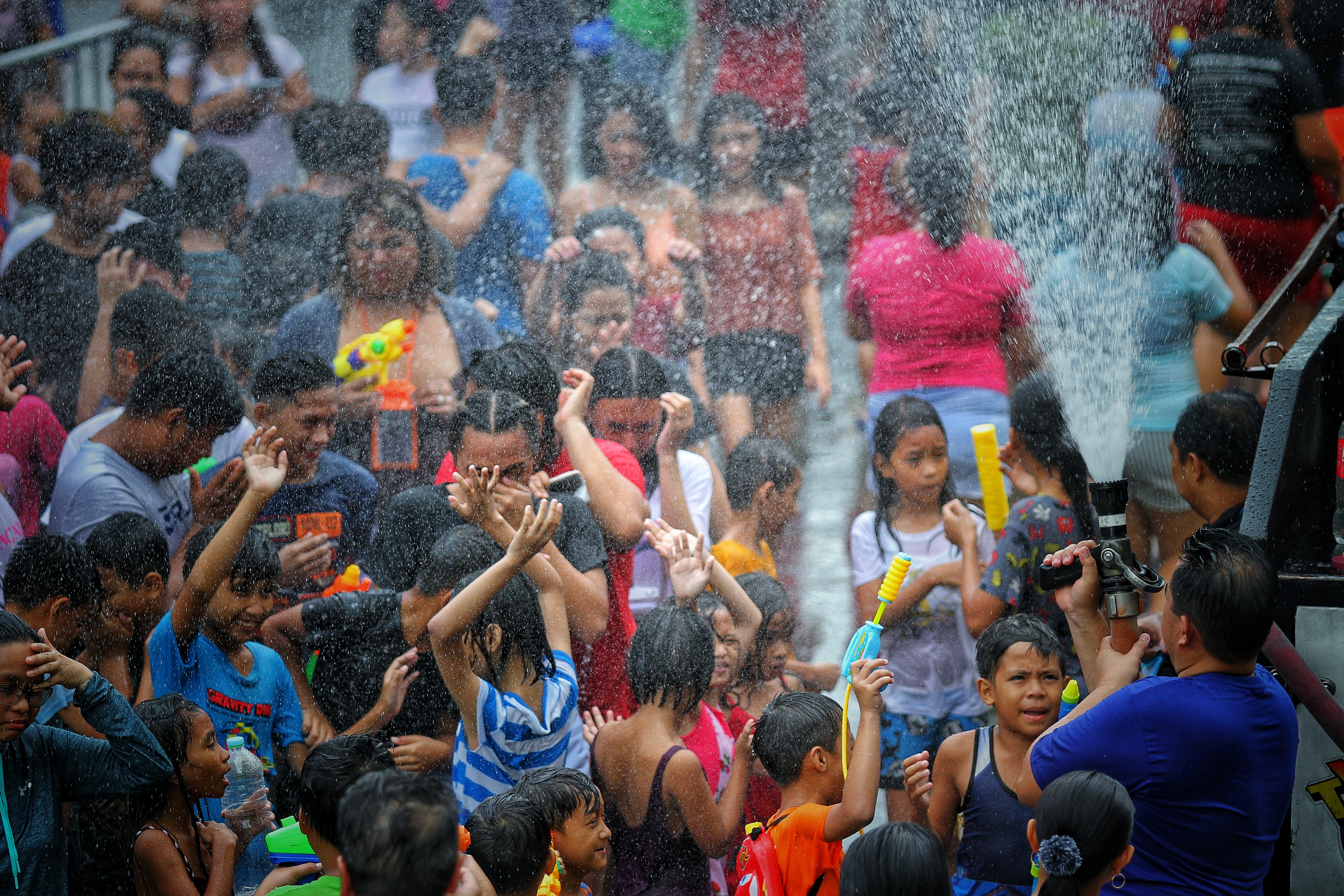
Wattah Wattah Festival

Metro Manila is frequently the setting for mostly Filipino books, movies, and television programs. Flores de Mayo is widely celebrated throughout all the places in Metro Manila. The yearly Metro Manila Film Festival, inaugurated in 1966, is the forerunner of all Philippine film festivals. The Wattah Wattah Festival is widely celebrated in San Juan, which involves dousing of water to people.

=== Architecture ===
Metro Manila has architecturally noteworthy buildings in a wide range of styles and from distinct periods, from the Spanish colonial period such as the Walled City of Intramuros, to the modern skyscrapers such as the Mega Tower in Ortigas Center and the Metrobank Center in Bonifacio Global City. Metro Manila's skyline, with its many skyscrapers, has been recognized as an iconic symbol of the region, and is home to almost all of the tallest buildings in the Philippines. It ranks 16th for metropolitan area with the most number of skyscrapers in the world.

The character of Metro Manila's residential districts reflect a vary of architectural styles from the Spanish Colonial Period up to the modern contemporary architecture.

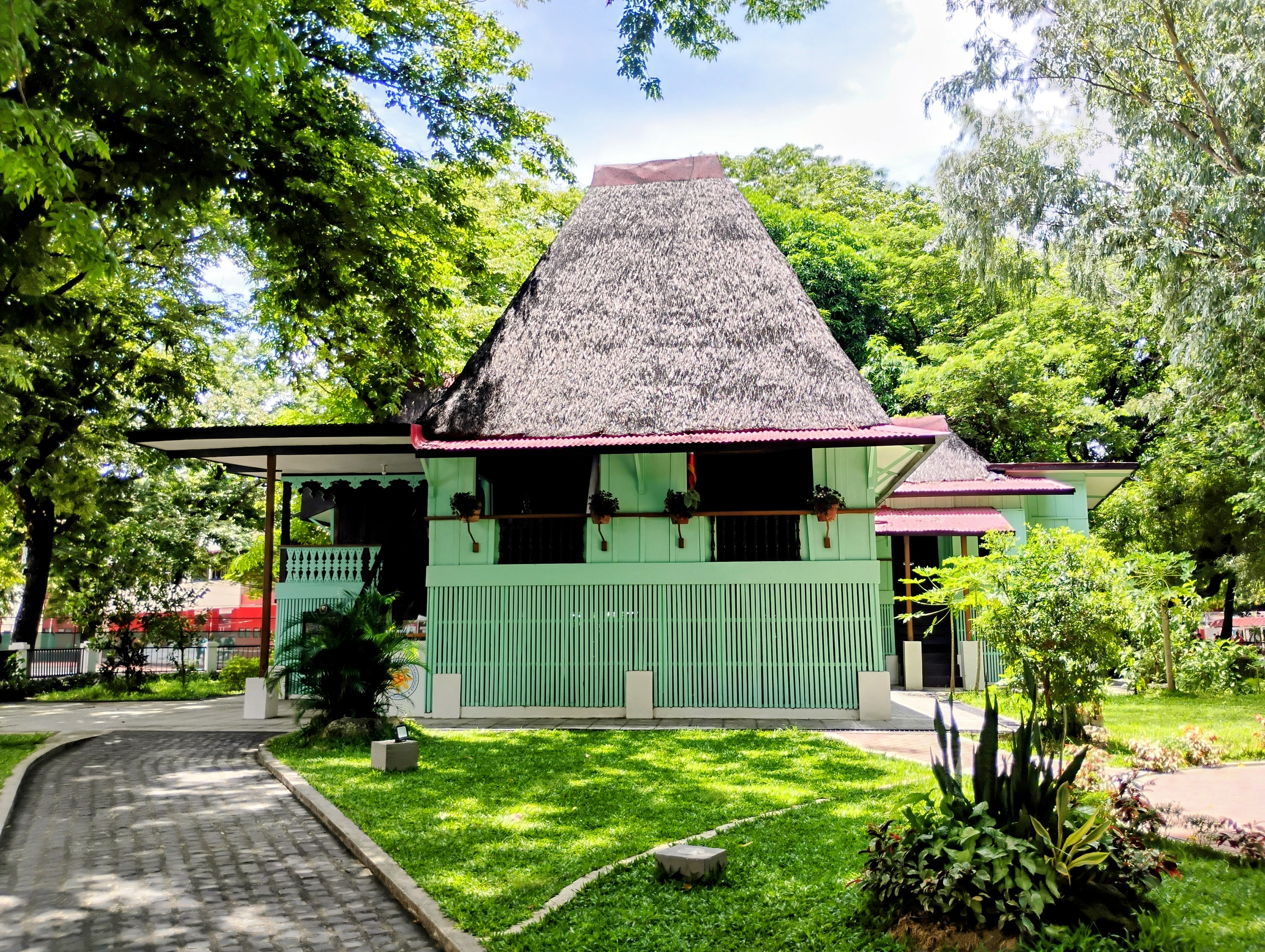
Mabini Shrine in Manila

Ocampo Pagoda Mansion in Manila

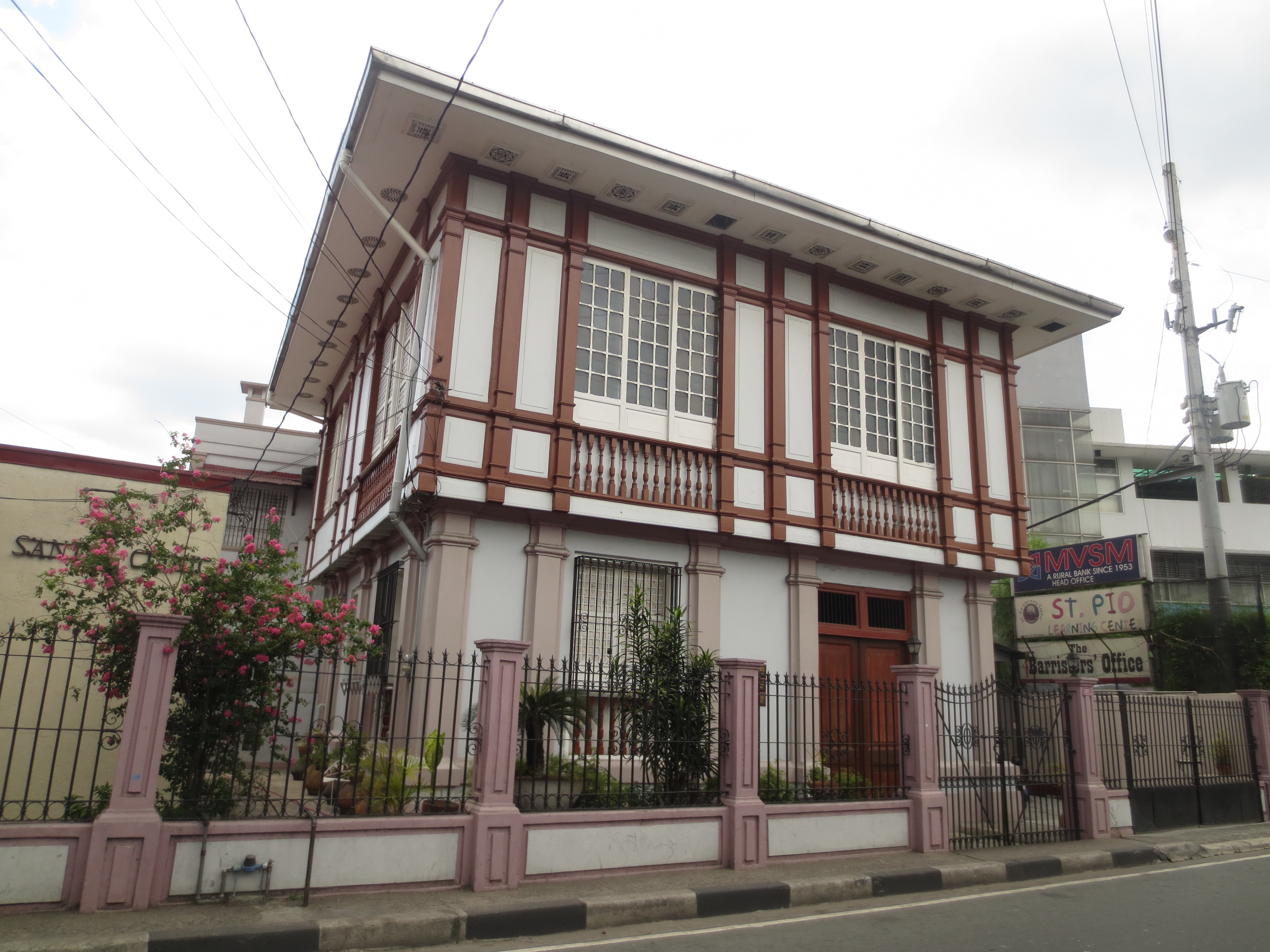
Zamora House in Marikina

The Philippine Heart Center in Quezon City is an exemplary model of brutalist government edifice

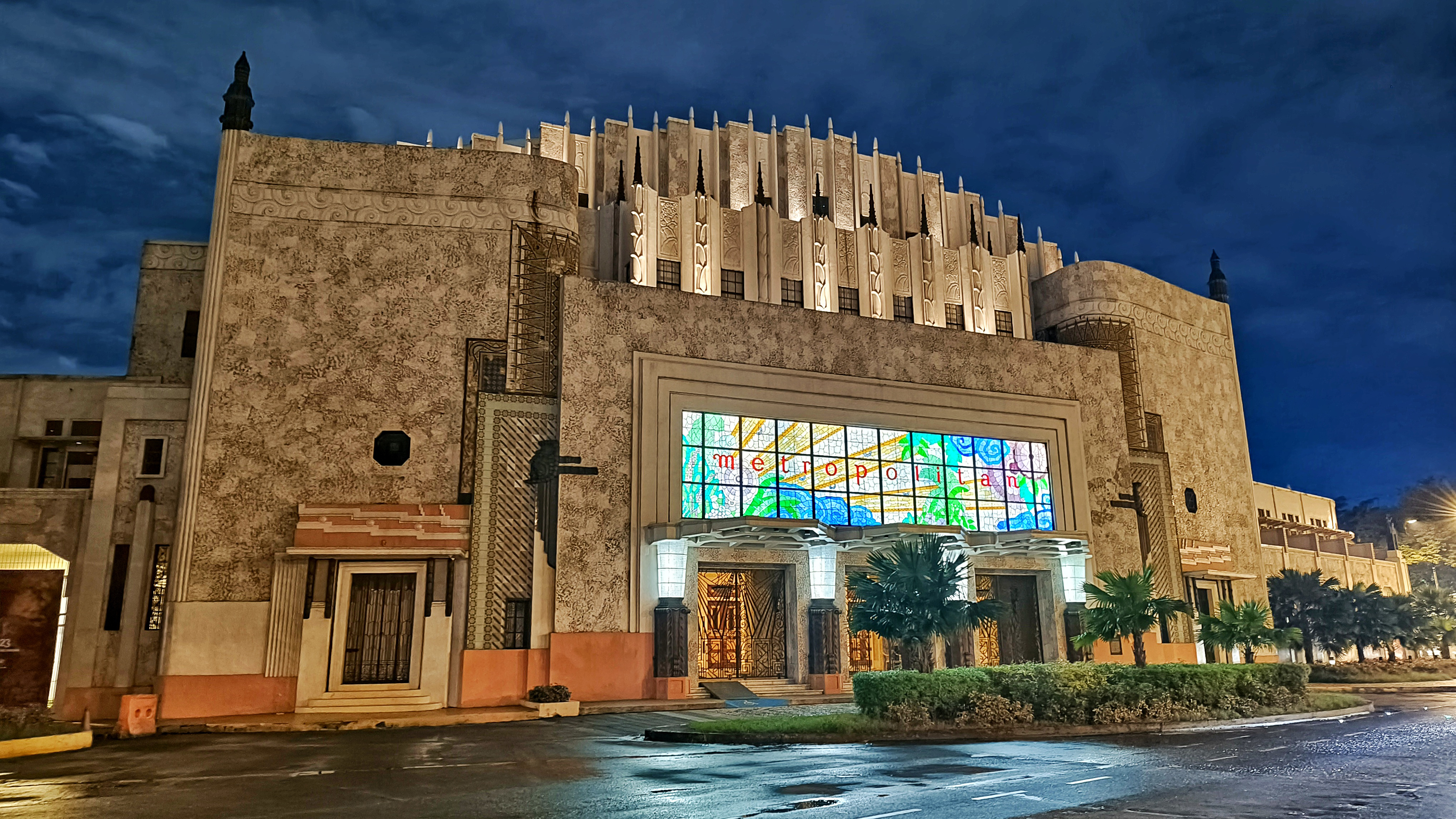
The Manila Metropolitan Theater in Art Deco style

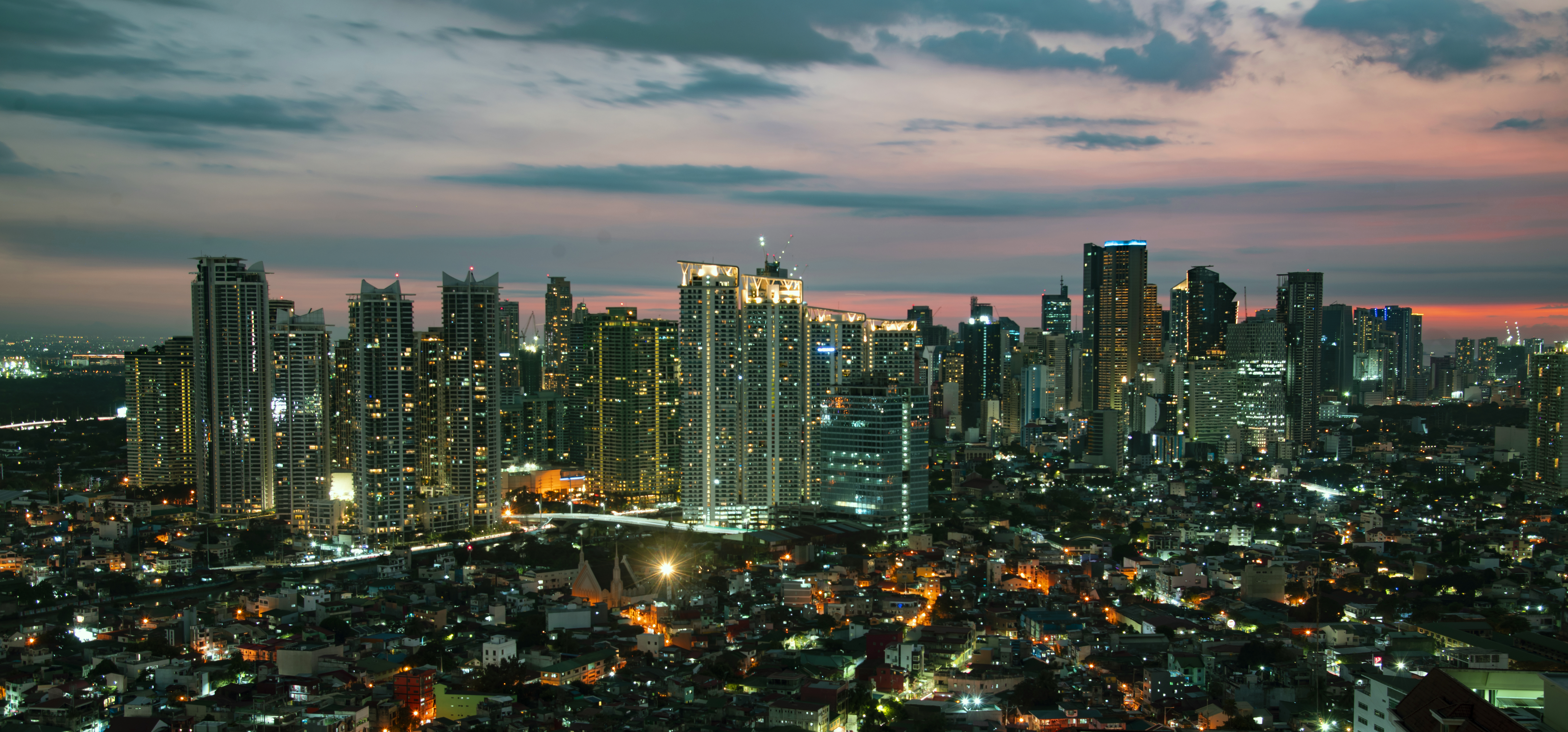
Makati-Mandaluyong skyline showing the various architectural styles in Metro Manila

New Manila neighborhood in Quezon City, one of the more affluent areas in the region, has lush landscaping and vegetation

A street in Pasig, with a typical cityscape that can be found throughout the metropolitan area

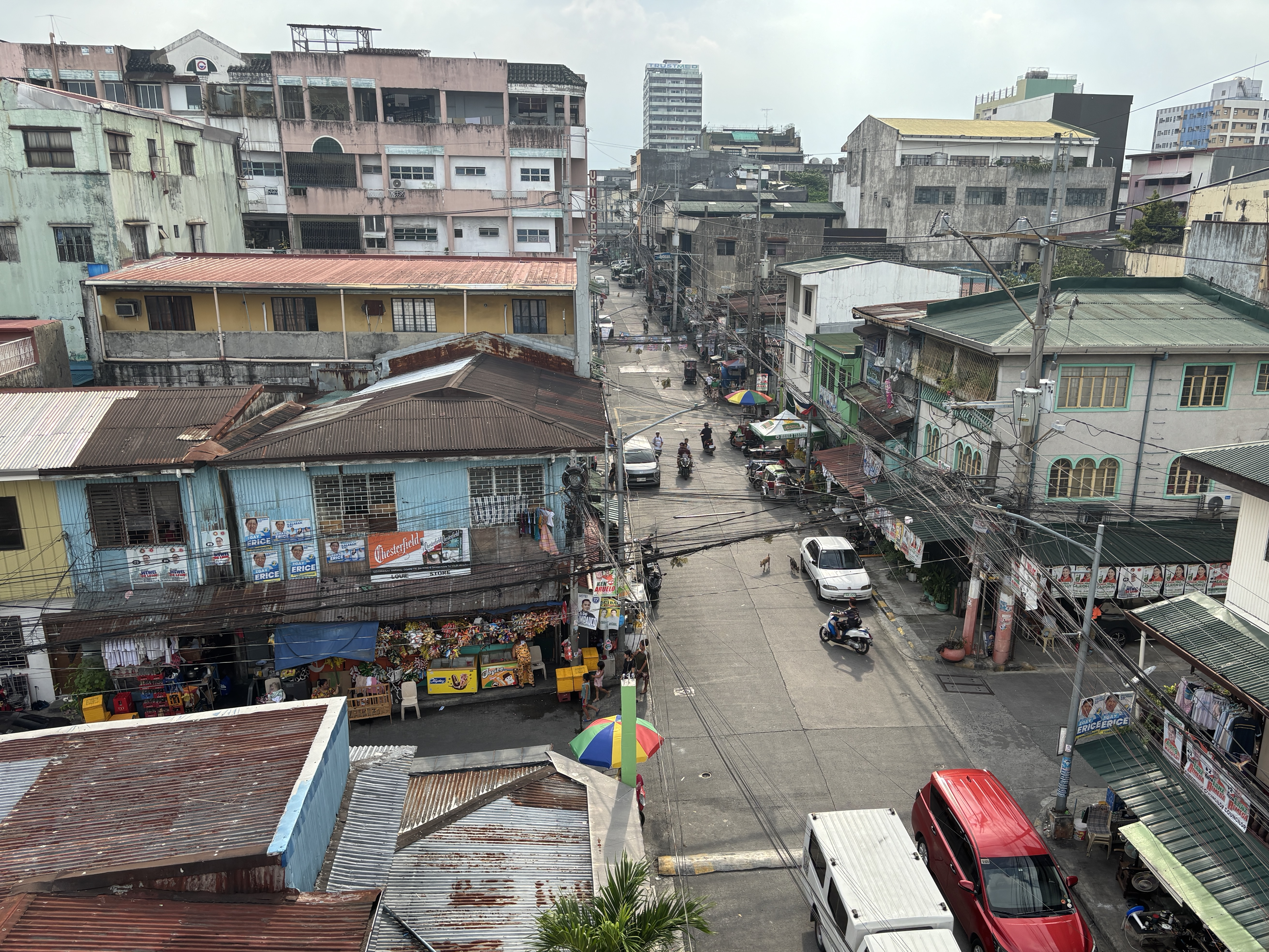
Typical residential area in Caloocan

=== Arts ===
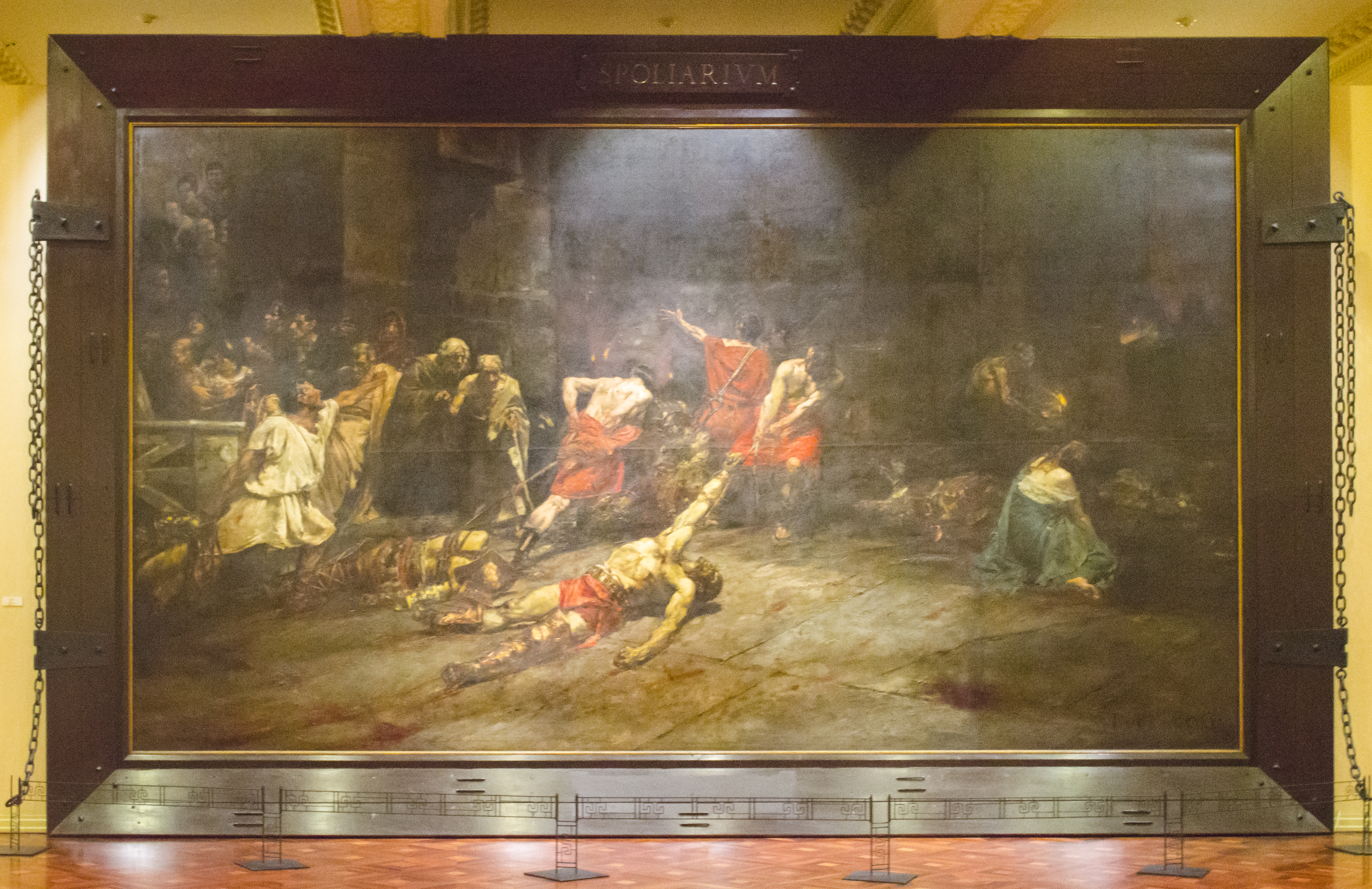
"Spoliarium", displayed at the National Museum of the Philippines

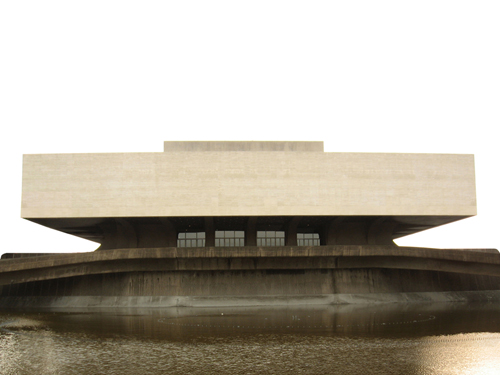
The Tanghalang Pambansa of the Cultural Center of the Philippines

Metro Manila is the home to the National Museum of the Philippines, the national museum of the country. It operates a chain of museums located in the grounds of Rizal Park just outside Intramuros, such as the National Museum of Fine Arts, the National Museum of Anthropology and the National Museum of Natural History. The National Museum complex occupies the place and buildings that were a part of a new capital center proposed by Daniel Burnham in 1901.

Prominent museums in Metro Manila include the Ayala Museum, Bahay Tsinoy, Casa Manila, Lopez Museum, Metropolitan Museum of Manila, The Mind Museum, Museo Pambata, Museo Valenzuela, Museum of Philippine Political History, Pasig City Museum and the Rizal Shrine. Museums established by educational institutions are the Ateneo Art Gallery, Jorge B. Vargas Museum and Filipiniana Research Center, Museum of Contemporary Art and Design, UP Museum of a History of Ideas, and the UST Museum of Arts and Sciences. The Light and Space Contemporary is an artist-run gallery in within Quezon City.

The national theater of the Philippines, known as the "Tanghalang Pambansa", is situated on a 62 hectares (150 acres) cultural center called the Cultural Center of the Philippines Complex. The complex is located between the cities of Manila and Pasay. Aside from the CCP, other popular performing arts venue include Cuneta Astrodome, Mall of Asia Arena, Rizal Park, Quezon Memorial Circle and Smart Araneta Coliseum. Other venues used are the UPFI Film Center and UP Theater in the University of the Philippines Diliman. The famed Manila Metropolitan Theater, also known as The Met, was constructed in 1931 and was known as the "Grand Dame" among all the Art Deco theaters of Manila. Years of neglect forces its closure in 1996. The Met will be restored through a tripartite agreement with the National Commission for Culture and the Arts, the National Museum of the Philippines and the Escuela Taller.

=== Religion ===
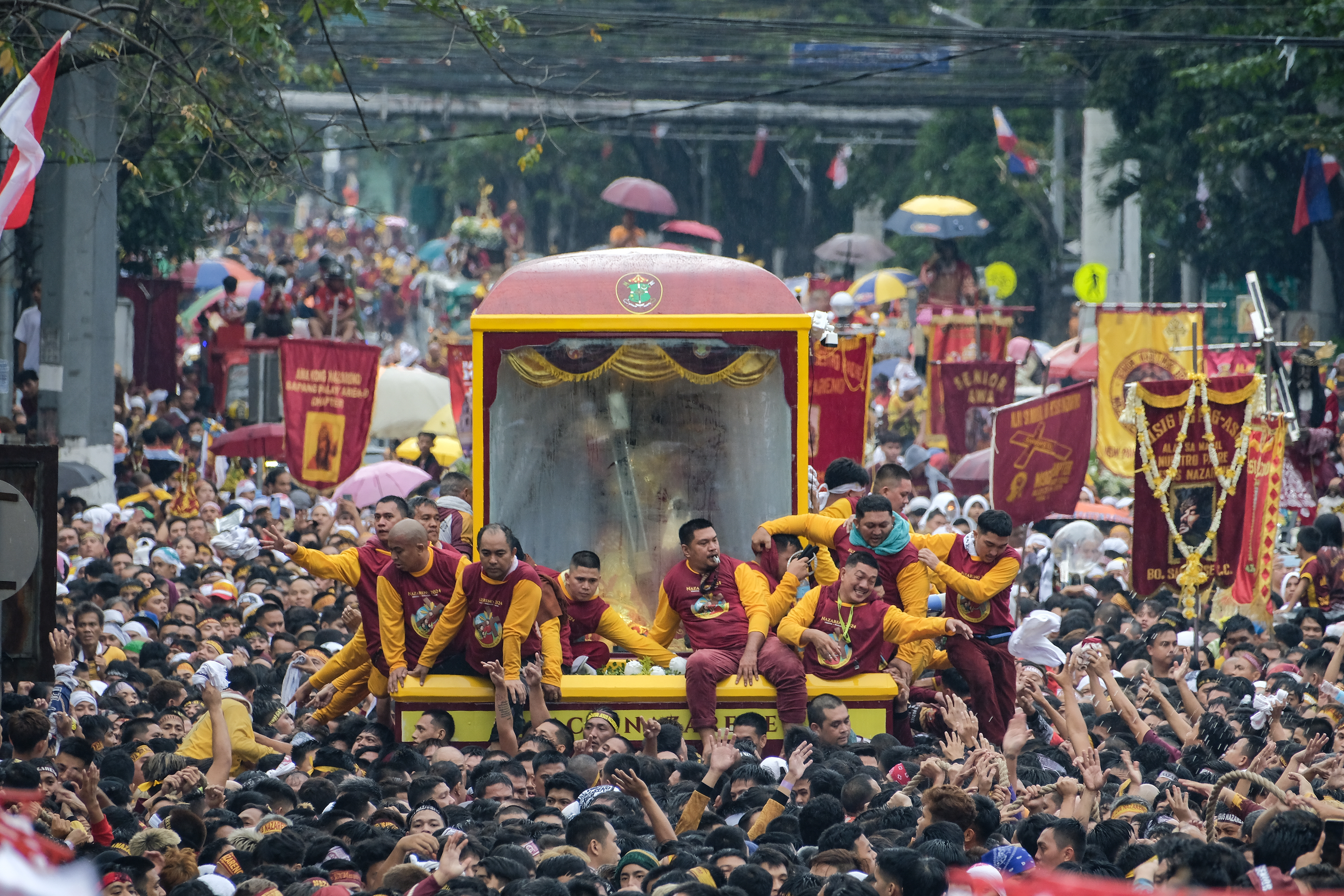
Feast of the Black Nazarene, a Catholic event originating in Manila

Christianity is the dominant religion in Metro Manila, which is subdivided in different denominations. The Catholic Church is the predominant religion in Metro Manila. Among the most important Catholic churches in the region are Manila Cathedral, San Sebastian Church (Manila), Tondo Church, San Agustin Church (Manila), Quiapo Church and Baclaran Church. Other Christian denominations in the region include the Iglesia ni Cristo, a new religious Christian movement founded in Manila on 1913, the Iglesia Filipina Independiente, an independent Catholic denomination in the form of religious nationalism, and other non-denominational churches such as the Cathedral of Praise, Christ's Commission Fellowship, Jesus Is Lord Church, and the Every Nation Churches & Ministries. Numerous Buddhist temples have been established throughout the region, notably in areas where there are a high-concentration of Filipino-Chinese people. The Muslims maintains a strong presence in the region, mainly located at the Muslim quarter in Quiapo, Manila where the Masjid Al-Dahab is located, as well as in Maharlika Village in Taguig, the home of the Blue Mosque. Other beliefs and faiths such as Anitists, animists, and atheists are the minority.

Manila Cathedral is the seat of the Archdiocese of Manila

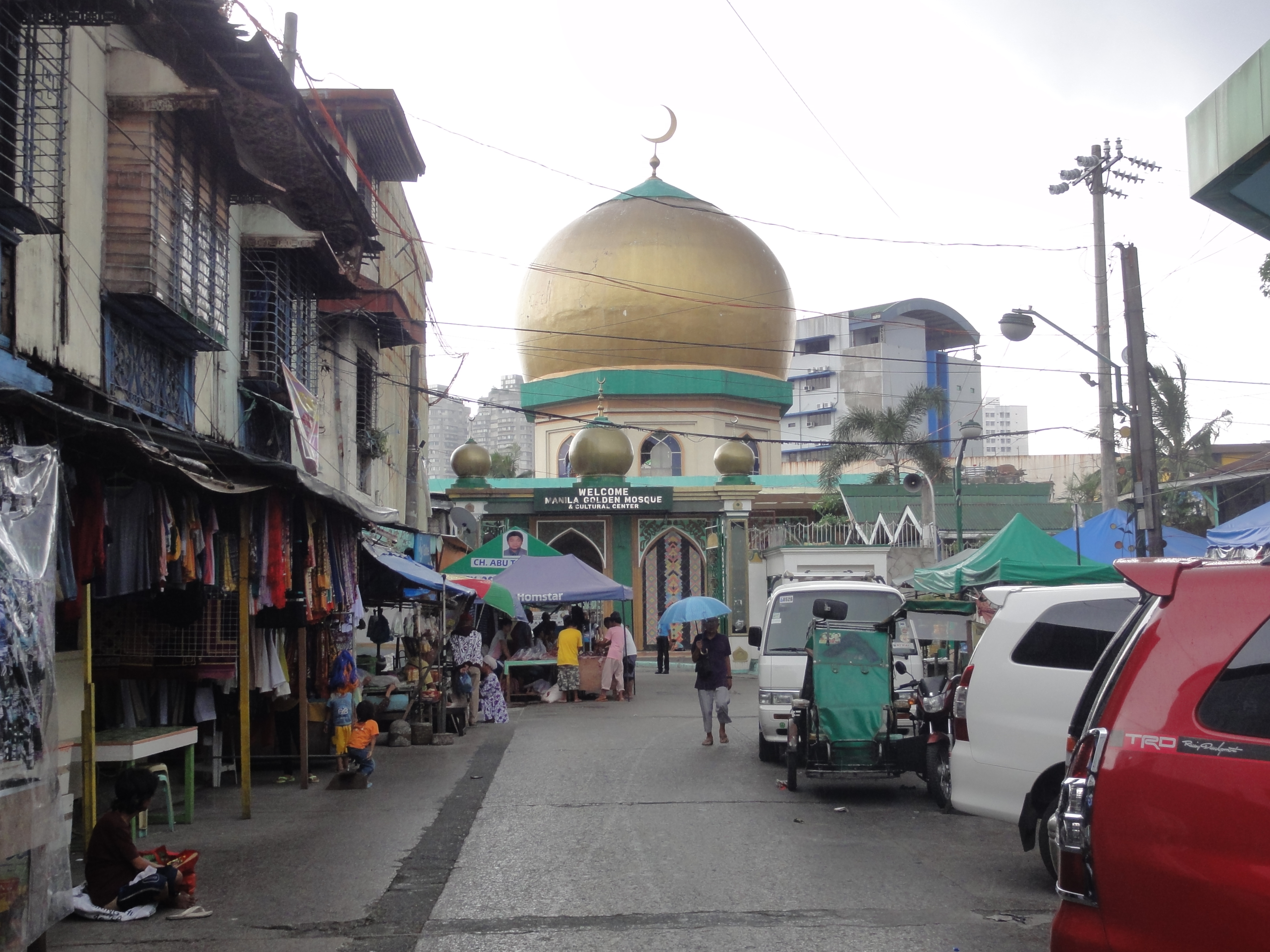
The Masjid Al-Dahab is considered as the largest mosque in Metro Manila

INC Central Temple is the flagship temple of the Christian new religious movement Iglesia ni Cristo (INC)

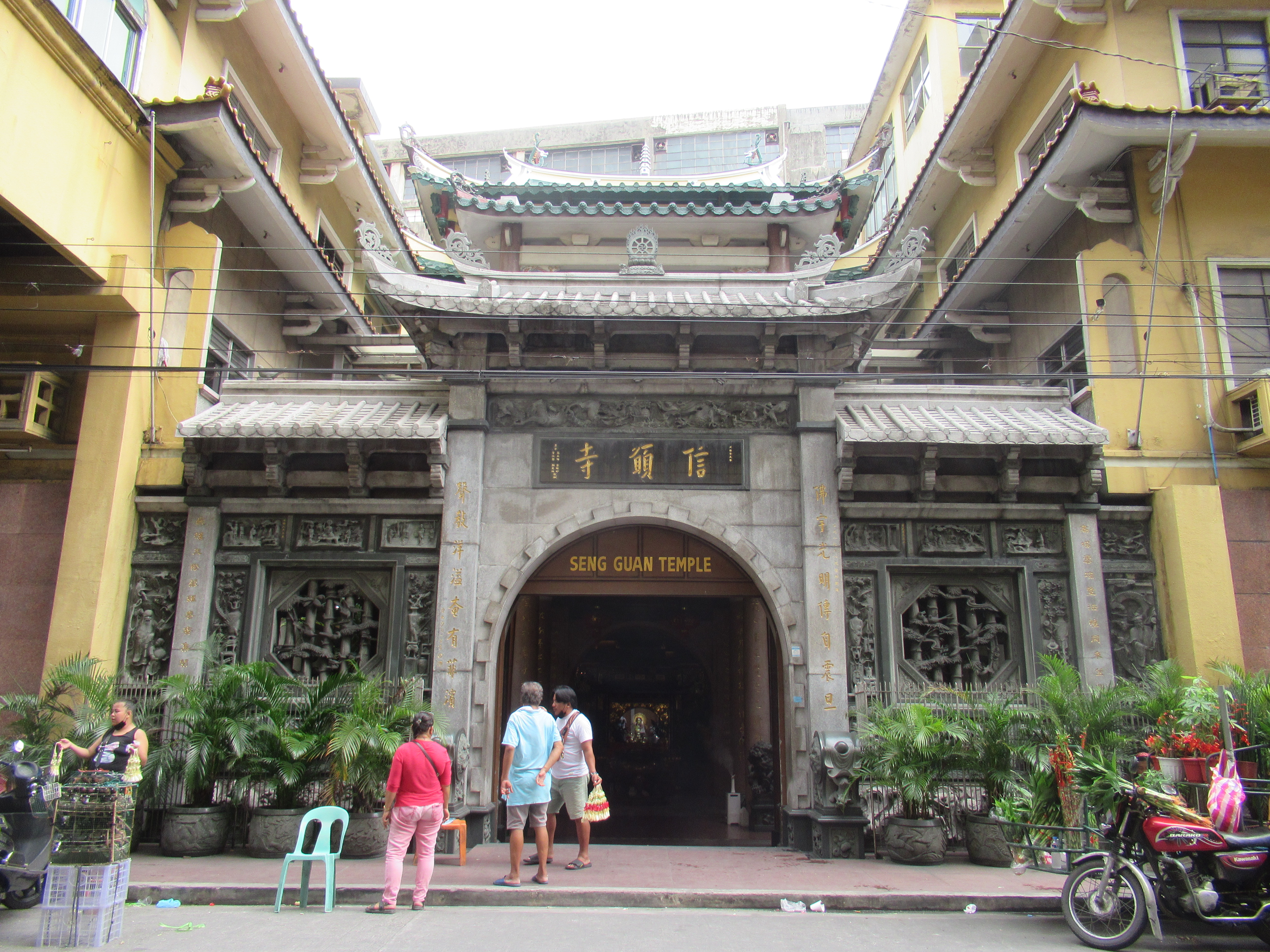
Seng Guan Temple in Tondo, Manila is regarded as the first Buddhist temple in the Philippines

Christ's Commission Fellowship, one of the largest non-denominational church located in Pasig

=== Sports ===
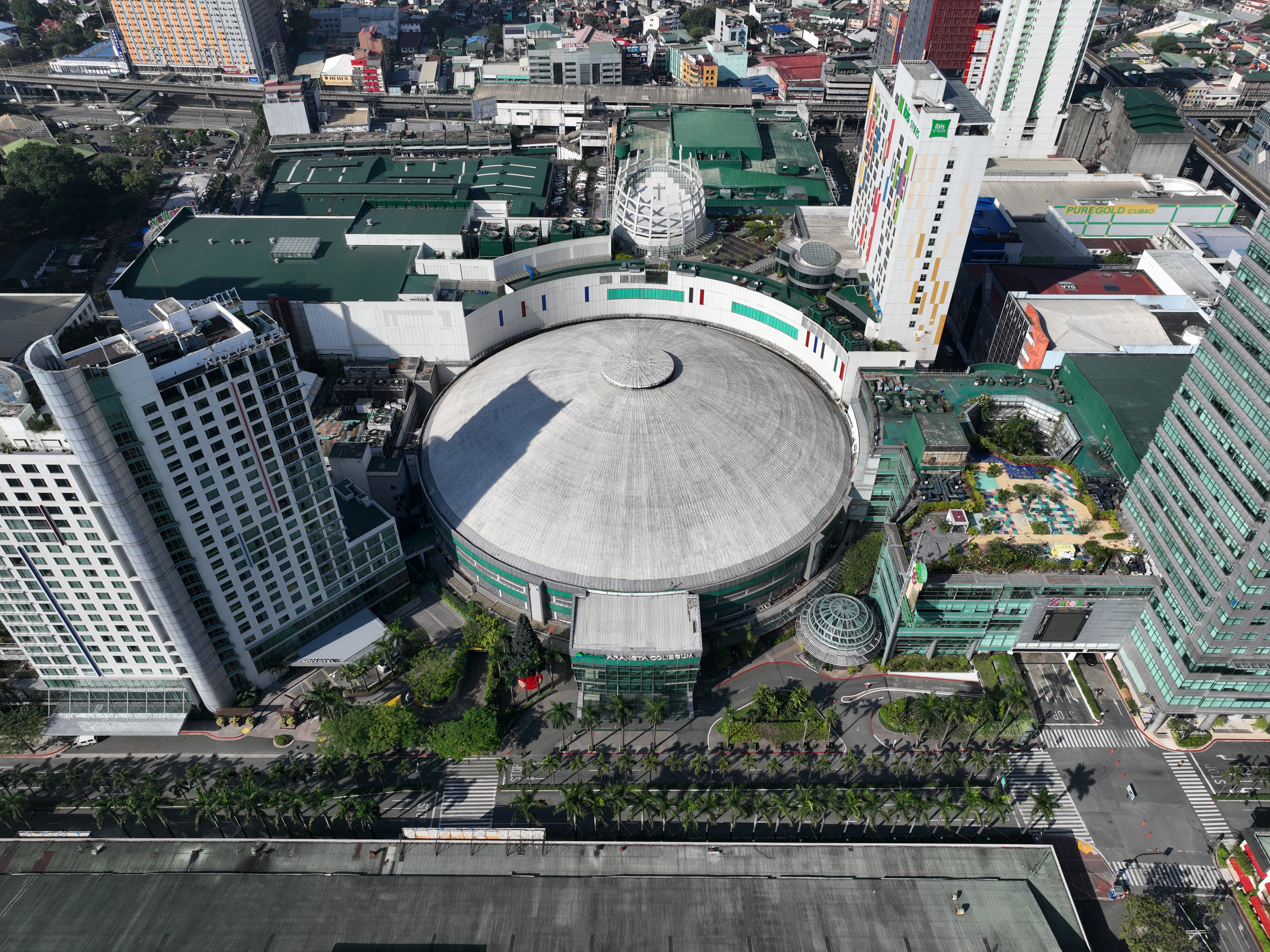
Araneta Coliseum was the largest indoor arena in Asia from 1960 until 2001

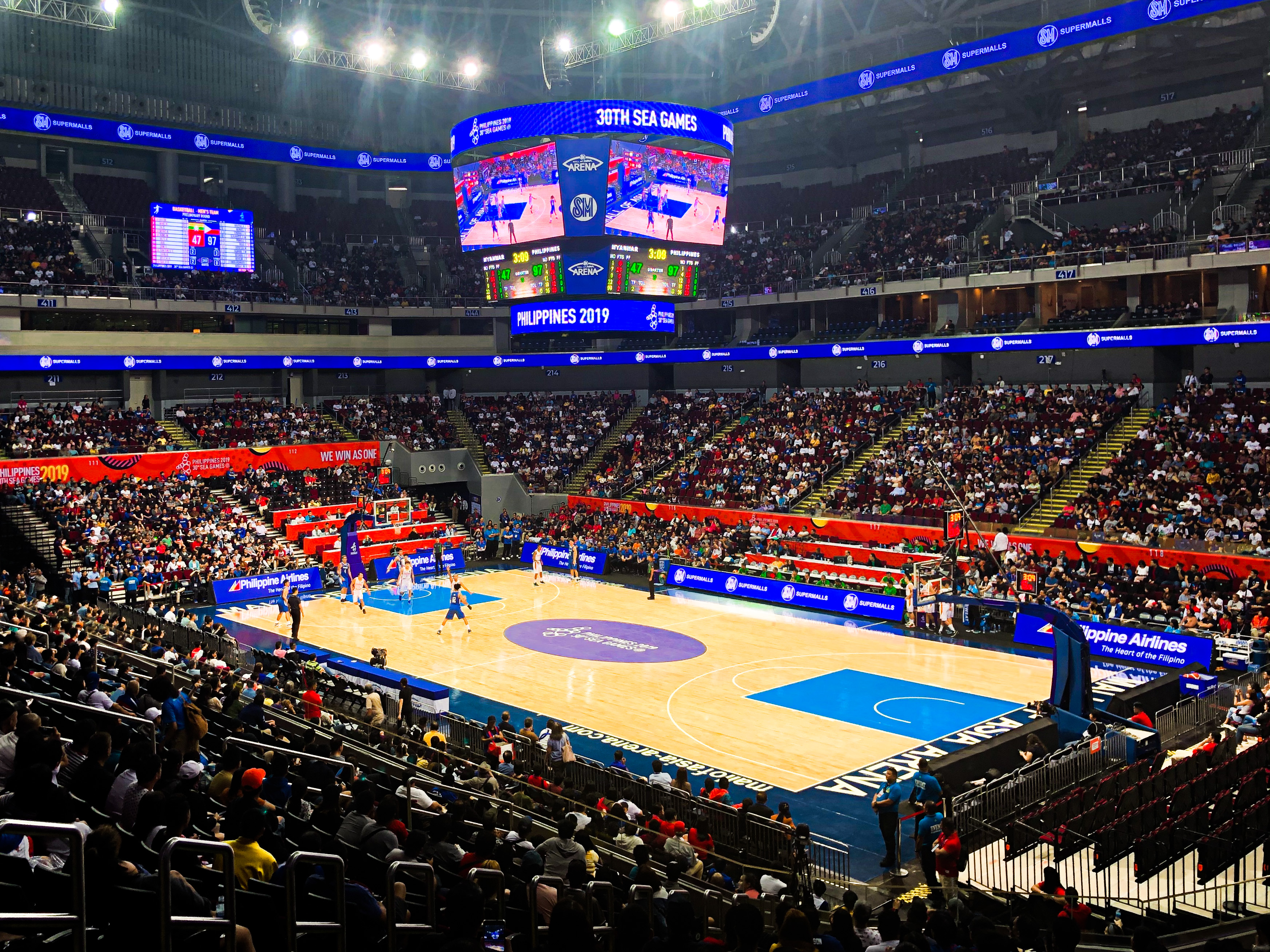
A 2019 Southeast Asian Games basketball game held at the Mall of Asia Arena

The National Capital Region is the home to the headquarters of the ASEAN Basketball League, Baseball Philippines, Philippine Basketball Association, Maharlika Pilipinas Basketball League, Philippine Super Liga, Shakey's V-League and the Philippines Football League. Collegiate leagues based in the National Capital Region are the Colleges and Universities Sports Association, National Athletic Association of Schools, Colleges and Universities, National Collegiate Athletic Association, National Capital Region Athletic Association, State Colleges and Universities Athletic Association, Universities and Colleges Athletic Association, University Athletic Association of the Philippines, Women's National Collegiate Athletic Association, Men's National Collegiate Athletic Association and University of Makati's Association of Local Colleges and Universities.

Two national sports complex is located in the region, the Rizal Memorial Sports Complex and the PhilSports Complex. The Wack Wack Golf and Country Club has hosted major tournaments such as the Philippine Open and the World Cup. Prominent sporting venues in Metro Manila include the Smart Araneta Coliseum, Mall of Asia Arena, Filoil Flying V Arena and the Cuneta Astrodome. The Greater Manila Area is also home to the Philippine Arena, the world's largest indoor arena. It is located in Bocaue, Bulacan and it has a maximum capacity of 55,000 people.

Metro Manila's, and in general the country's main sport is basketball. Another popular sport in the city are cue sports, and billiard halls are found in many places. Baseball, volleyball, football and swimming are also widely played sports. The region has been the champion of the Palarong Pambansa for 13 straight years. Manila Storm are a rugby league team training out of Rizal Park (Luneta Park) and playing home matches at the Southern Plains Field, Calamba, Laguna. The Metro Manila area is also home to a number of rugby union teams such as the Alabang Eagles, Makati Mavericks, Manila Nomads Sports Club and the Manila Hapons.

== Media ==
=== TV stations ===
There are 11 analog and 17 digital television stations in the region.

== See also ==
- Outline of Metro Manila
- List of metropolitan areas in Asia
- Greater Manila Area
- Imperial Manila
- Mega Manila
