= 2022 San Mateo, Rizal, local elections =

Part of the Philippine general election

2022 San Mateo local elections
- May 9, 2022
- Turnout: 84.16% ▲9.46 pp
- Mayoral election
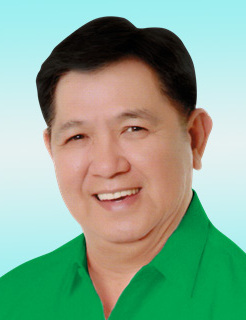
		PDPLBN
Candidate	Omie Rivera	Jose Rafael Diaz
Party	Liberal	PDP–Laban
Alliance	I Love San Mateo	1SanMateo
Running mate	Ariel Diaz	Jimmy Roxas
Popular vote	56,110	36,695
Percentage	60.46%	39.54%
Mayor before election
Tina Diaz
PDP–Laban
Elected mayor
Omie Rivera
Liberal
- Vice mayoral election
	PDPLBN	Aksyon
Candidate	Jimmy Roxas	Ariel Diaz
Party	PDP–Laban	Aksyon
Alliance	1SanMateo	I Love San Mateo
Popular vote	45,951	41,909
Percentage	52.30%	47.70%
Vice mayor before election
Jose Rafael Diaz
PDP–Laban
Elected Vice mayor
Jimmy Roxas
PDP–Laban

Local elections were held in San Mateo, Rizal, on May 9, 2022, as part of the Philippine general election. Held concurrently with the national elections, the electorate voted to elect a mayor, a vice mayor, eight members of the municipality's municipal council, a board member to the Rizal Provincial Board, and a representative to the House of Representatives. Those elected assumed their respective posts on June 30, 2022, alongside other local and national officials. 92,805 of 110,276 registered voters voted in these elections.

Omie Rivera and Jimmy Roxas were elected to the mayoralty and vice mayoralty respectively, ending the Diaz family's longstanding hold on the municipality's mayoralty. Despite their mayoral loss, 1SanMateo won an outright majority in the municipal council, winning six of the eight elective seats. The remaining two seats were won by members of Team I Love San Mateo.

This election was the first to utilize the newly created Rizal's 3rd congressional district, which gave the municipality its own representation in the House of Representatives and the Rizal Provincial Board. Jose Arturo Garcia Jr. and John Patrick Bautista won their respective races to represent the district as a representative and as a board member respectively.

== Background ==
In the 2019 elections, Tina Diaz and her husband Jose Rafael Diaz were re-elected to the municipality's mayoralty and vice mayoralty respectively, with Tina defeating Independent Wilfredo Selga and Jose Rafael being unopposed in the vice mayoral race. The Diaz family has controlled the municipality's mayoralty for decades at that point.

On March 25, 2022, President Rodrigo Duterte signed Republic Act 11533 into law, thereby separating the municipalities of San Mateo and Rodriguez from the province's second district to create its third and fourth districts. The law took effect on April 12, 2022, though the second district remained intact until the election and subsequent inauguration of the representatives for the new districts. Juan Fidel Felipe Nograles remained as the second district's representative until the end of the 18th Congress; he was redistricted to the fourth district after the division.

On August 20, 2020, both Tina and Jose Rafael Diaz tested positive for COVID-19; Municipal Administrator Ricardo Gomez was designated as the alternate signatory to all official municipal transactions as Diaz recovers from the disease.

MMDA General Manager Jose Arturo Garcia resigned his post as general manager on October 4, 2021, in order to run for representative.

== Coalitions ==
As the mayor, vice mayor and the members of the municipal council are elected on the same ballot, mayoral candidates may present or endorse a slate of candidates. These slates usually run with their respective mayoral and vice mayoral candidates along with the other members of their slate. A group of candidates independent of any mayoral or vice mayoral candidate may also form a slate consisting of themselves.

=== Administration coalition ===
1SanMateo
#	Name	Party
For Mayor
1.	Jose Rafael Diaz	PDP–Laban
For Vice Mayor
2.	Jimmy Roxas	PDP–Laban
For House of Representatives (Rizal–3rd)
1.	Tina Diaz	PDP–Laban
For Rizal Provincial Board (3rd district)
2.	Hermenegildo Cequeña	PDP–Laban
For Municipal Council
4.	Leo Buenviaje	PDP–Laban
6.	Cristeo Cruz	PDP–Laban
7.	Denzel Diaz	PDP–Laban
8.	Joel Diaz	PDP–Laban
12.	Jojo Mariano	PDP–Laban
17.	Froy Sales	PDP–Laban
18.	Roger San Miguel	PDP–Laban
20.	Tonyo Santos	PDP–Laban

=== Primary opposition coalition ===
Team I Love San Mateo
#	Name	Party
For Mayor
2.	Omie Rivera	Liberal
For Vice Mayor
1.	Ariel Diaz	Aksyon
For House of Representatives (Rizal–3rd)
3.	Jose Arturo Garcia Jr.	NPC
For Rizal Provincial Board (3rd district)
1.	John Patrick Bautista	NPC
For Municipal Council
2.	Nelson Antonio	NPC
3.	Joey Briones	PDP–Laban
5.	Jancat Cataluña	Aksyon
10.	Lani Inton	Aksyon
15.	Frank Lamsen	PDP–Laban
17.	Vince Robosa	Aksyon
16.	Boy Salen	NPC
22.	Noel Sta. Maria	Liberal

=== Other coalitions ===
Aksyon Demokratiko
#	Name	Party
For House of Representatives (Rizal–3rd)
2.	Maria Cristina Diaz	Aksyon
For Rizal Provincial Board (3rd district)
2.	Cirilo Oropesa Jr.	Aksyon

Labor Party Philippines
#	Name	Party
For Municipal Council
18.	Rommel San Pascual	WPP
21.	Wilfredo Selga	WPP

=== Independents not in coalitions ===
#	Name	Party
For Municipal Council
1.	Geremy Albeleda	Independent
9.	Ariel Gutierrez	Independent
14.	Juanito Payumo	Independent

=== Non-independents not in coalitions ===
#	Name	Party
For Municipal Council
13.	Nimfa Operio	PDDS

== Mayoral election ==
The incumbent mayor was Tina Diaz, who was re-elected in 2019 with 82.67% of the vote. Diaz opted to run for representative in the newly created San Mateo–based Rizal's 3rd congressional district, rather than a third term as mayor. Her coalition, 1SanMateo nominated her husband, Vice Mayor Jose Rafael to run in her stead. Jose Rafael previously served as mayor from 2007 through 2016.

Team I Love San Mateo slated outgoing Board Member and former Vice Mayor Omie Rivera to challenge Diaz.

=== Candidates ===
- Jose Rafael Diaz (PDP–Laban) – incumbent vice mayor of San Mateo (2019–2022), former mayor of San Mateo (2007–2016)
- Omie Rivera (Liberal) – incumbent Board Member for the 2nd district (2016–2022), former vice mayor of San Mateo

=== Results ===
Results of the election per ER Returns

Rivera defeated Diaz in a landslide, ending the family's decades-long hold on the municipality's mayoralty. Rivera's election as mayor was considered as an upset victory by some observers.

Candidate	Party	Votes	%
Omie Rivera	Liberal Party	56,110	60.46
Jose Rafael Diaz	PDP–Laban	36,695	39.54
Total		92,805	100.00
Registered voters/turnout		110,276	–
Liberal gain from PDP–Laban			

Popular vote percentage
Rivera	60.46%
Diaz	39.54%

==== Per barangay ====
Barangay	Rivera		Diaz	
Barangay	Votes	%	Votes	%
Ampid 1	7,175	67.38	3,473	32.62
Ampid 2	1,192	46.82	1,354	53.18
Banaba	5,774	61.47	3,619	38.53
Dulong Bayan 1	1,676	60.51	1,094	39.49
Dulong Bayan 2	2,549	62.38	1,537	37.62
Guinayang	2,389	65.15	1,278	34.85
Guitnang Bayan 1	7,420	68.96	3,340	31.04
Guitnang Bayan 2	4,270	63.75	2,428	36.25
Gulod Malaya	2,347	61.22	1,487	38.78
Malanday	3,572	55.23	2,896	44.77
Maly	3,315	56.58	2,544	43.42
Pintong Bukawe	847	40.64	1,237	59.36
Santa Ana	2,614	52.5	2,365	47.5
Santo Niño	2,633	55.99	2,070	44.01
Silangan	8,337	58.26	5,973	41.74
Total	56,110	60.46	36,695	39.54

== Vice mayoral election ==
The incumbent vice mayor was Jose Rafael Diaz, who was re-elected without opposition in 2019. Diaz ran for a comeback to the municipality's mayoralty, after his wife, Tina, opted to run for Congress. His coalition nominated incumbent Councilor Jimmy Roxas to run in his place.

Team I Love San Mateo slated Ariel Diaz to challenge Roxas.

=== Candidates ===
- Ariel Diaz (Aksyon)
- Jimmy Roxas (PDP-Laban) – Incumbent Member of the Municipal Council, Candidate for mayor in 2013

=== Results ===
Results of the election per ER Returns

Roxas narrowly defeated Diaz, defending the vice mayoralty for PDP-Laban.

Candidate	Party	Votes	%
Jimmy Roxas	PDP–Laban	45,951	52.30
Ariel Diaz	Aksyon Demokratiko	41,909	47.70
Total		87,860	100.00
Registered voters/turnout		110,276	–
PDP–Laban hold			

Popular vote percentage
Roxas	52.30%
Diaz	47.70%

==== Per barangay ====
Barangay	Roxas		Diaz	
Barangay	Votes	%	Votes	%
Ampid 1	5,299	52.20	4,852	47.80
Ampid 2	1,473	61.32	929	38.68
Banaba	4,751	53.47	4,134	46.53
Dulong Bayan 1	1,424	53.59	1,233	46.41
Dulong Bayan 2	1,991	50.71	1,935	49.29
Guinayang	1,855	53.06	1,641	46.94
Guitnang Bayan 1	4,809	46.80	5,466	53.20
Guitnang Bayan 2	3,250	50.95	3,129	49.05
Gulod Malaya	2,002	55.17	1,627	44.83
Malanday	3,279	53.33	2,869	46.67
Maly	2,940	52.85	2,623	47.15
Pintong Bukawe	1,260	64.85	683	35.15
Santa Ana	2,436	51.64	2,281	48.36
Santo Niño	2,321	53.48	2,019	46.52
Silangan	6,861	51.40	6,488	48.60
Total	45,951	52.30	41,909	47.70

== House of Representatives election ==
On March 25, 2021, Rizal's 2nd congressional district—which then included San Mateo—was split into three districts, with the third solely encompassing San Mateo. The second district in its previous form was last represented by Juan Fidel Nograles, who was re-elected in 2019 with 69.01% of the votes within the municipality. Nograles, who hails from Rodriguez, was redistricted to the fourth district, leaving the third district with an open race as a result.

The field to fill the open seat included three candidates. Incumbent Mayor Tina Diaz was nominated by the PDP–Laban to run for the seat, with the support of the ruling 1SanMateo coalition. Meanwhile, Team I Love San Mateo nominated Former Metropolitan Manila Development Authority General Manager Jose Arturo Garcia to challenge Diaz for the seat. Maria Cristina Diaz ran under the Aksyon Demokratiko party.

=== Candidates ===
- Tina Diaz (PDP–Laban) – incumbent mayor of San Mateo (2016–2022)
- Ma. Cristina Diaz (Aksyon)
- Jose Arturo Garcia (NPC) – Metropolitan Manila Development Authority General Manager (2018–2021)

=== Results ===
Results of the election per ER Returns

Garcia defeated both Tina Diaz and Ma. Cristina Diaz to become the district's first representative in its history.

Candidate	Party	Votes	%
Jose Arturo Garcia	Nationalist People's Coalition	48,640	53.33
Tina Diaz	PDP–Laban	36,673	40.21
Maria Cristina Diaz	Aksyon Demokratiko	5,894	6.46
Total		91,207	100.00
Registered voters/turnout		110,276	–
NPC win (new seat)			

Popular vote percentage
Garcia	53.33%
T. Diaz	40.21%
M. Diaz	6.46%

==== Per barangay ====
Barangay	Garcia		T. Diaz		M. Diaz	
Barangay	Votes	%	Votes	%	Votes	%
Ampid 1	6,008	58.20	3,651	35.37	664	6.43
Ampid 2	1,002	40.13	1,350	54.06	145	5.81
Banaba	4,681	50.64	3,960	42.84	603	6.52
Dulong Bayan 1	1,525	55.68	1,110	40.53	104	3.8
Dulong Bayan 2	2,269	56.08	1,574	38.9	203	5.02
Guinayang	2,069	57.46	1,310	36.38	222	6.16
Guitnang Bayan 1	6,362	60.26	3,550	33.62	646	6.12
Guitnang Bayan 2	3,757	56.93	2,515	38.11	327	4.96
Gulod Malaya	1,885	50.54	1,569	42.06	276	7.4
Malanday	3,321	51.79	2,691	41.97	400	6.24
Maly	2,924	50.54	2,473	42.75	388	6.71
Pintong Bukawe	735	35.65	1,138	55.19	189	9.17
Santa Ana	2,218	45.54	2,325	47.74	327	6.71
Santo Niño	2,370	51.17	1,946	42.01	316	6.82
Silangan	7,514	53.26	5,511	39.06	1,084	7.68
Total	48,640	53.33	36,673	40.21	5,894	6.46

== Provincial board election ==
The second district in its previous form was represented in the Rizal Provincial Board by incumbents Rommel Ayuson, Omie Rivera, Rolando Rivera, and Dino Tanjuatco, who were all re-elected in 2019. Following the creation of the third district—which solely encompasses San Mateo—the municipality is represented by one board member elected by the district.

Among the four incumbents, Ayuson and Tanjuatco ran for public office in other districts; Omie Rivera ran for the Mayoralty of San Mateo; and Rolando Rivera was term-limited, later dying in office on March 24, 2022. Thus, the third district was left with an open race for its provincial board seat.

The ruling 1SanMateo coalition nominated Hermenegildo Cequeña for the seat, while Team I Love San Mateo nominated John Patrick Bautista for the seat. A third candidate—Cirilo Oropesa Jr.—also ran for the seat.

=== Candidates ===
- John Patrick Bautista (NPC) – Candidate for vice mayor in 2016
- Hermenegildo Cequeña (PDP–Laban)
- Cirilo Oropesa Jr. (Aksyon)

=== Results ===
Results of the election per ER returns

Bautista defeated both Cequeña and Oropesa to become the district's sole board member.

Candidate	Party	Votes	%
John Patrick Bautista	Nationalist People's Coalition	41,651	53.22
Hermenegildo Cequeña	PDP–Laban	30,429	38.88
Cirilo Oropesa Jr.	Aksyon Demokratiko	6,183	7.90
Total		78,263	100.00
Registered voters/turnout		110,276	–
NPC win (new seat)			

Popular vote percentage
Bautista	53.22%
Cequeña	38.88%
Oropesa Jr.	7.90%

==== Per barangay ====
Barangay	Bautista		Cequeña		Oropesa	
Barangay	Votes	%	Votes	%	Votes	%
Ampid 1	4,841	54.89	3,203	36.32	776	8.80
Ampid 2	971	45.91	1,024	48.42	120	5.67
Banaba	3,590	44.79	2,751	34.32	1,674	20.89
Dulong Bayan 1	1,593	64.57	817	33.12	57	2.31
Dulong Bayan 2	2,131	58.92	1,322	36.55	164	4.53
Guinayang	1,722	54.70	1,259	39.99	167	5.30
Guitnang Bayan 1	5,281	57.68	3,224	35.22	650	7.10
Guitnang Bayan 2	3,380	57.98	2,159	37.03	291	4.99
Gulod Malaya	1,629	51.39	1,254	39.56	287	9.05
Malanday	3,366	60.28	1,996	35.74	222	3.98
Maly	2,451	48.00	2,397	46.94	258	5.05
Pintong Bukawe	676	40.65	889	53.46	98	5.89
Santa Ana	2,166	51.65	1,828	43.59	200	4.77
Santo Niño	1,809	48.33	1,622	43.33	312	8.34
Silangan	6,045	51.95	4,684	40.25	907	7.79
Total	41,651	53.22	30,429	38.88	6,183	7.90

== Municipal Council election ==
The San Mateo Municipal Council is composed of eight councilors elected to serve three-year terms. The election for the council is done via multiple non-transferable vote in which a voter has eight votes to distribute to eight different candidates. The eight candidates with the most votes will be elected to the council.

1SanMateo maintained their control of the municipal council, winning six of the eight elective seats. Meanwhile, Team I Love San Mateo won two seats.

=== Results ===
==== Per candidate ====
2022 San Mateo municipal council election
Party	Candidate	Votes	%
NPC	Boy Salen	47,577	49.16%
PDP–Laban	Joey Briones	40,000	41.33%
PDP–Laban	Jojo Mariano	39,815	41.14%
PDP–Laban	Leo Buenviaje	38,136	39.40%
PDP–Laban	Cristeo Cruz	37,385	38.63%
PDP–Laban	Joel Diaz	36,387	38.06%
PDP–Laban	Froy Sales	36,057	37.26%
PDP–Laban	Denzel Diaz	34,658	35.81%
PDP–Laban	Roger San Miguel	34,221	35.36%
NPC	Antonio Nelson	32,975	34.07%
Liberal	Emmanuel Sta. Maria	32,898	33.99%
PDP–Laban	Tonyo Santos	32,321	33.40%
PDP–Laban	Frank Lamsen	31,062	32.09%
Aksyon	Lani Inton	30,189	31.19%
Aksyon	Jancat Cataluña	30,164	31.17%
Aksyon	Vince Robosa	29,670	30.66%
WPP	Wilfredo Selga	10,253	10.56%
Independent	Ariel Gutierrez	9,357	9.67%
WPP	Rommel San Pascual	8,326	8.60%
PDDS	Nimfa Operio	7,334	7.58%
Independent	Geremy Albeda	7,155	7.39%
Independent	Juanito Payumo	6,096	6.30%
Total votes		612,036	100.00%

==== Per coalition ====
Party or alliance		Votes	%	Seats
Partido Demokratiko Pilipino-Lakas ng Bayan		288,980	47.22	6
Team I Love San Mateo	Nationalist People's Coalition	80,552	13.16	1
Team I Love San Mateo	Partido Demokratiko Pilipino-Lakas ng Bayan	71,062	11.61	1
Team I Love San Mateo	Aksyon Demokratiko	90,023	14.71	0
Team I Love San Mateo	Liberal Party	32,898	5.38	0
Team I Love San Mateo	Total	274,535	44.86	2
Labor Party Philippines		18,579	3.04	0
Pederalismo ng Dugong Dakilang Samahan		7,334	1.20	0
Independents		22,608	3.69	0
Ex officio seats				2
Total		612,036	100.00	10

Vote share
1SanMateo	47.22%
Team I Love San Mateo	44.86%
Others	7.92%

City Council seats
1SanMateo	60.00%
Team I Love San Mateo	20.00%
Others	0%
