= Globe Asiatique =

Philippine real estate corporation

- Industry: Real estate
- Founded: November 1994; 31 years ago
- Founder: Delfin Lee
- Headquarters: Pasig, Philippines
- Products: Housing units
- Brands: Xevera
- Subsidiaries: Filmal

Globe Asiatique Realty Holdings Corp (GARHC), simply known as Globe Asiatique (abbreviated as GA), is a Philippine real estate corporation.

It is known for its townships in Central Luzon and Southern Luzon, mostly developed in the 2000s and has built high-rises along EDSA in Metro Manila. The company declined in the 2010s after it got implicated in a housing loan scandal.

== History ==
=== Early years ===
Globe Asiatique Realty Holding was incorporated on November 22, 1994 with Delfin Lee as its founder. Lee envisioned the company would be providing housing to people mostly in the low to middle-income demographic. The company's low-cost housing units and lots were made more affordable through the government's Home Development Mutual Fund (HDMF, also known as Pag-IBIG Fund) housing loan program. Globe Asiatique's first residential housing project was the Santa Barbara Villas I subdivision in San Mateo, Rizal launched in 1994. It was a socialized housing project, originally meant to house Lee's 300 employees but a total of 3,500 houses were built for the development.

=== Growth: 2000–2009 ===
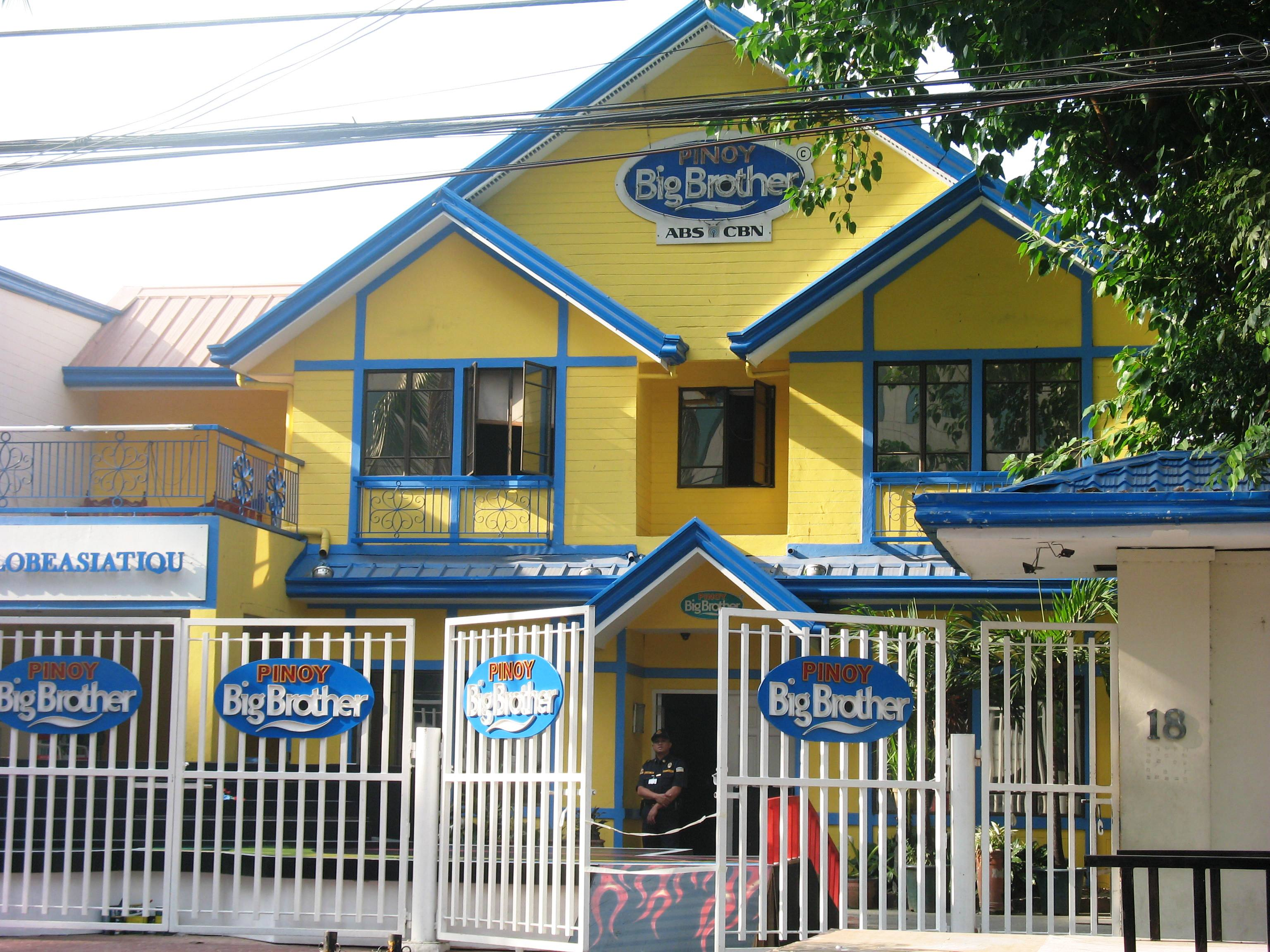
The Pinoy Big Brother house was patterned after St. Monique Valais housing units.

In the 2000s, Globe Asiatique established several residential townships including its flagship Xevera Homes in Bacolor and Mabalacat, Pampanga. It also built residential high-rises, with its first being the G.A. Tower Condominium I along EDSA in 2003. It also initiated the construction of the GA Skysuites (now The Skysuites Tower) in 2007.

The company has partnered with ABS-CBN with the company providing house and lot or condominium unit prizes to winners of the network's game shows Wowowee, Pinoy Big Brother (PBB), and Pinoy Dream Academy. The PBB house was modeled after a typical home in Globe Asiatique's St. Monique Valais subdivision. It also targeted Overseas Filipinos, by buying television spots on ABS-CBN's best performing shows which aired on The Filipino Channel.

Globe Asiatique was recognized as the Most Pioneering and Responsive Developer at the 2007 Real Estate Development Awards In 2009, Globe Asiatique listed a record income of ₱502 million and by that time has already established itself as a major player in real estate in the Philippines.

=== 2010s: Housing loan scandal ===
Globe Asiatique planned to make its debut in the Philippine Stock Exchange in 2010. However it did not push through its plans to launch its first initial public offering due to the 2008 financial crisis. In the same year, the company was already receiving negative publicity in regards to its transactions with the state-run Pag-IBIG Fund.

Pag-IBIG Fund employees in 2010 alleged that Globe Asiatique made the state-run agency grant housing loans to "ghost borrowers" who bought housing units in Xevera Homes in Pampanga. Executives of Globe Asiatique, including founder Delfin Lee, were charged with syndicated estafa (fraud) in 2012. The case was elevated to the Supreme Court. Lee was arrested in March 2014. Lee was later released in September 2018 on bail after his charge was downgraded to simple estafa. Lee denied the allegations, maintaining that no houses were "double sold", and expressed willingness to settle the issue with Pag-IBIG.

Lee and three other GA executives, along with a Pag-IBIG Fund chief, were cleared by a regional trial court in San Fernando, Pampanga in February 2026. The court granted a demurrer to evidence filed by the respondents, and stated that there was no proof showing the GA officials solicited funds from the public through illegal means. In May, Lee, as GA chairman, sought the return of funds held by Pag-IBIG Fund in escrow due to the fraud case.

== Projects ==
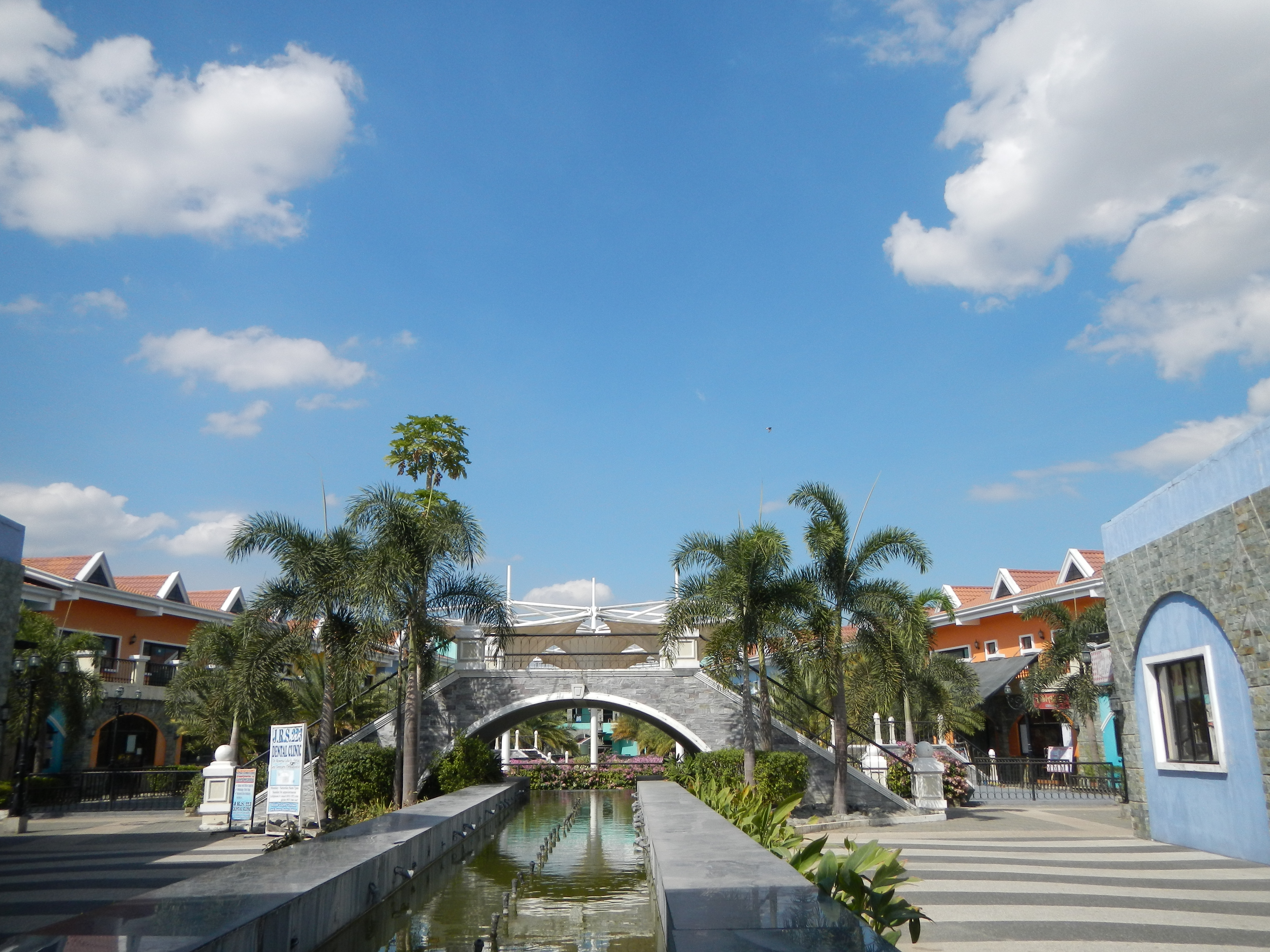
Xevera Mabalacat

The Skysuites Tower (formerly GA Skysuites)

GA Twin Towers

Globe Asiatique has several residential developments under its name, some of which are managed by its affiliate company Filmal Realty Corporation.

Xevera is the flagship township brand of Globe Asiatique. It has four subdivisions namely Xevera Mabalacat, Xevera Bacolor, and Sameera Angeles City in Pampanga and Xevera Neo-Calapan in Calapan, Oriental Mindoro. Westchester Realty Corp. acquired the three properties in Pampanga in 2020.

Other projects of Globe Asiatique include Chateau Valenzuela, a complex of 18 six-storey Mediterranean-style condominium buildings established in Valenzuela, Metro Manila in 2003, the Saint Monique Valais in Rizal in 2003, Casa Ibiza in Antipolo, Rizal in 2005, the Golden City Business Park in Bulacan in 2005, and The Enclave in Pampanga in 2006. It also developed the Santa Barbara Villas in San Mateo, Rizal in 1994. Globe Asiatique also planned to build a campus subdivision in Bacolod which was halted when the company got implicated in a controversy in 2010.

Globe Asiatique also developed high-rise residential projects along EDSA. Its first residential building was the GA Tower Condominium I which broke down in 2003. It was followed by GA Tower II in 2005 and the G.A. Twin Towers. Globe Asiatique began construction of GA Skysuites (later renamed to Skysuites Tower) in 2007. The property was foreclosed by the Rizal Commercial Banking Corporation in September 2010 and was acquired by DoubleDragon Properties in 2014.
