= DILG–NAPOLCOM Center =

Government building in Quezon City, Philippines

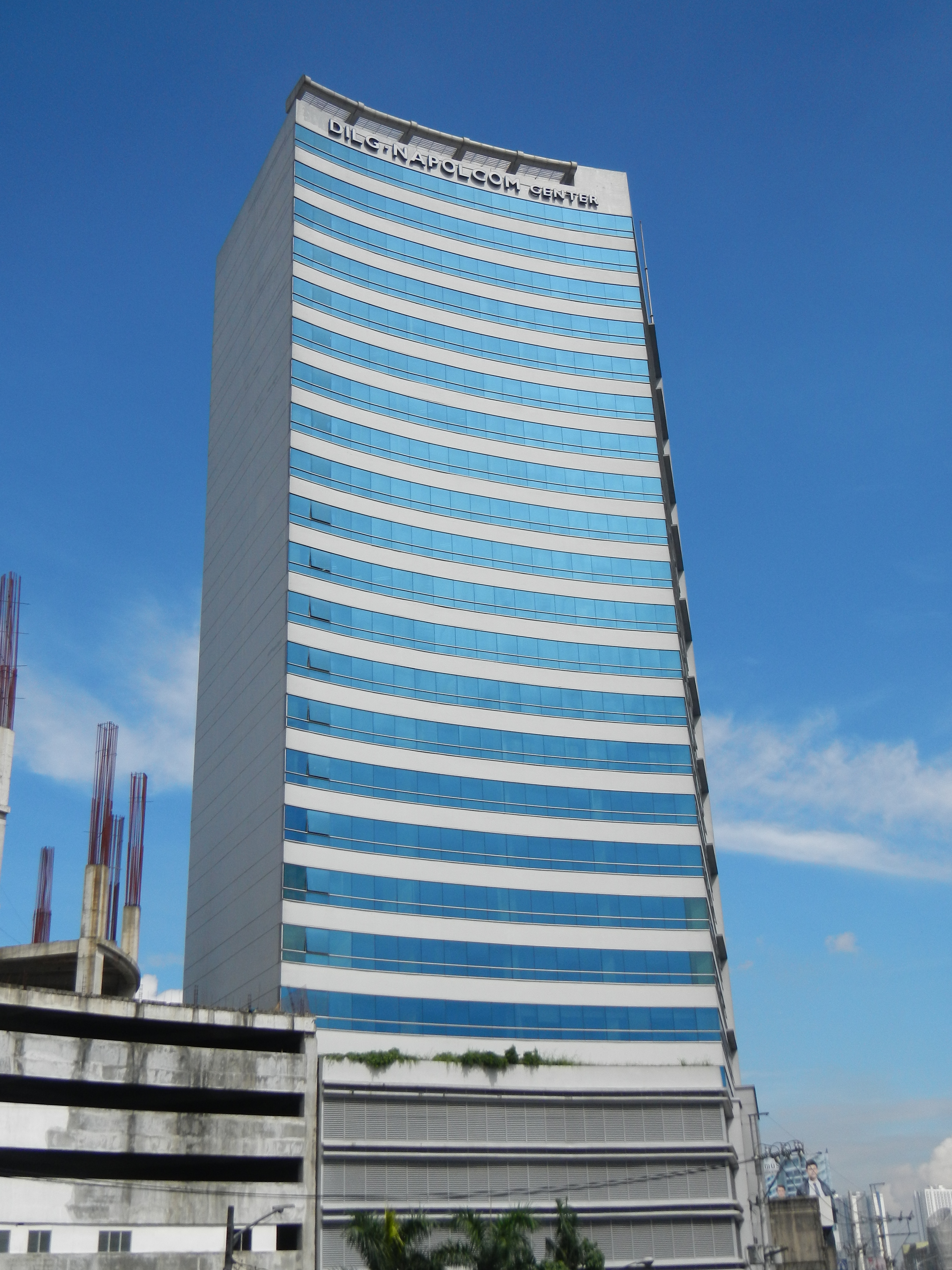
- Interactive map of the DILG–NAPOLCOM Center area
- Alternative names: NAPOLCOM Building

General information
- Status: Completed
- Location: West Triangle, Quezon City, Philippines
- Coordinates: 14°38′40.4″N 121°2′12.3″E
- Current tenants: Department of the Interior and Local Government; National Police Commission; Civil Service Commission (Philippines)
- Client: National Police Commission
- Owner: Government of the Philippines through National Police Commission
- Landlord: National Police Commission

Technical details
- Floor count: 27

Design and construction
- Developer: Megaworld Corporation

Other information
- Parking: 250 slots

The DILG–NAPOLCOM Center is a 27-storey government building situated along the corner of Quezon Avenue and EDSA in Quezon City, Philippines. It is beside The Skysuites Tower.

== Building ==
The main tenants of the DILG–NAPOLCOM Center, as its name suggests, is the Department of the Interior and Local Government (DILG) and the National Police Commission (NAPOLCOM). The DILG moved to the building in June 2013, while NAPOLCOM transferred to the building from its previous office in Makati in May 2014.

The 27-story building hosts an executive lounge, cafeteria, a roof deck, and a helipad. Eight levels are allotted as parking area, which has the capacity of 250 vehicles.

Megaworld Corporation was involved in the construction of the building as part of the company's ₱25 billion deal with NAPOLCOM.
