= Department of the Interior and Local Government =

Executive department of the Philippine government

- Kagawaran ng Interyor at Pamahalaang Lokal
- Seal

- Flag

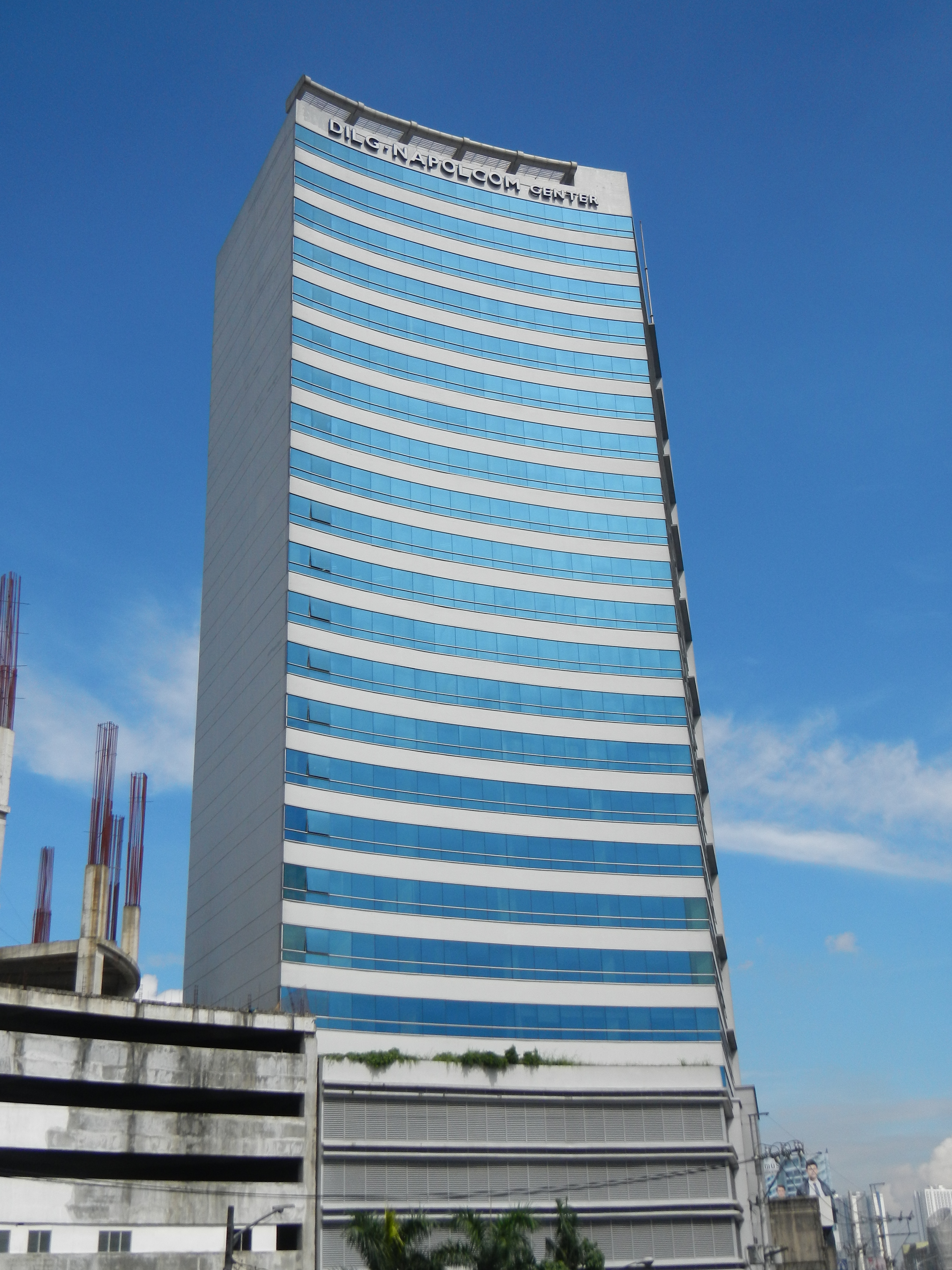
- DILG headquarters

Department overview
- Formed: March 22, 1897; 129 years ago
- Jurisdiction: Government of the Philippines
- Headquarters: DILG-NAPOLCOM Center, EDSA cor. Quezon Avenue, West Triangle, Quezon City; 14°38′39.9″N 121°2′12.3″E
- Employees: 4,352 (2024)
- Annual budget: ₱253.1 billion (2023) ▲
- Department executives: Juanito "Jonvic" Remulla, Secretary; Kevin R. Carpeso, Head Executive Assistant, Office of the Secretary; Rhazy Flor B. Fang, Spokesperson and Undersecretary for Plans, Public Affairs and Communications
- Child agencies: Bureau of Fire Protection; Bureau of Jail Management and Penology; Local Government Academy; National Commission on Muslim Filipinos; National Police Commission; National Youth Commission; Philippine Commission on Women; Philippine National Police; Philippine Public Safety College
- Website: dilg.gov.ph

The Department of the Interior and Local Government (DILG; Filipino: Kagawaran ng Interyor at Pamahalaang Lokal) is the executive department of the Philippine government responsible for promoting peace and order, ensuring public safety and strengthening local government capability aimed towards the effective delivery of basic services to the citizenry.

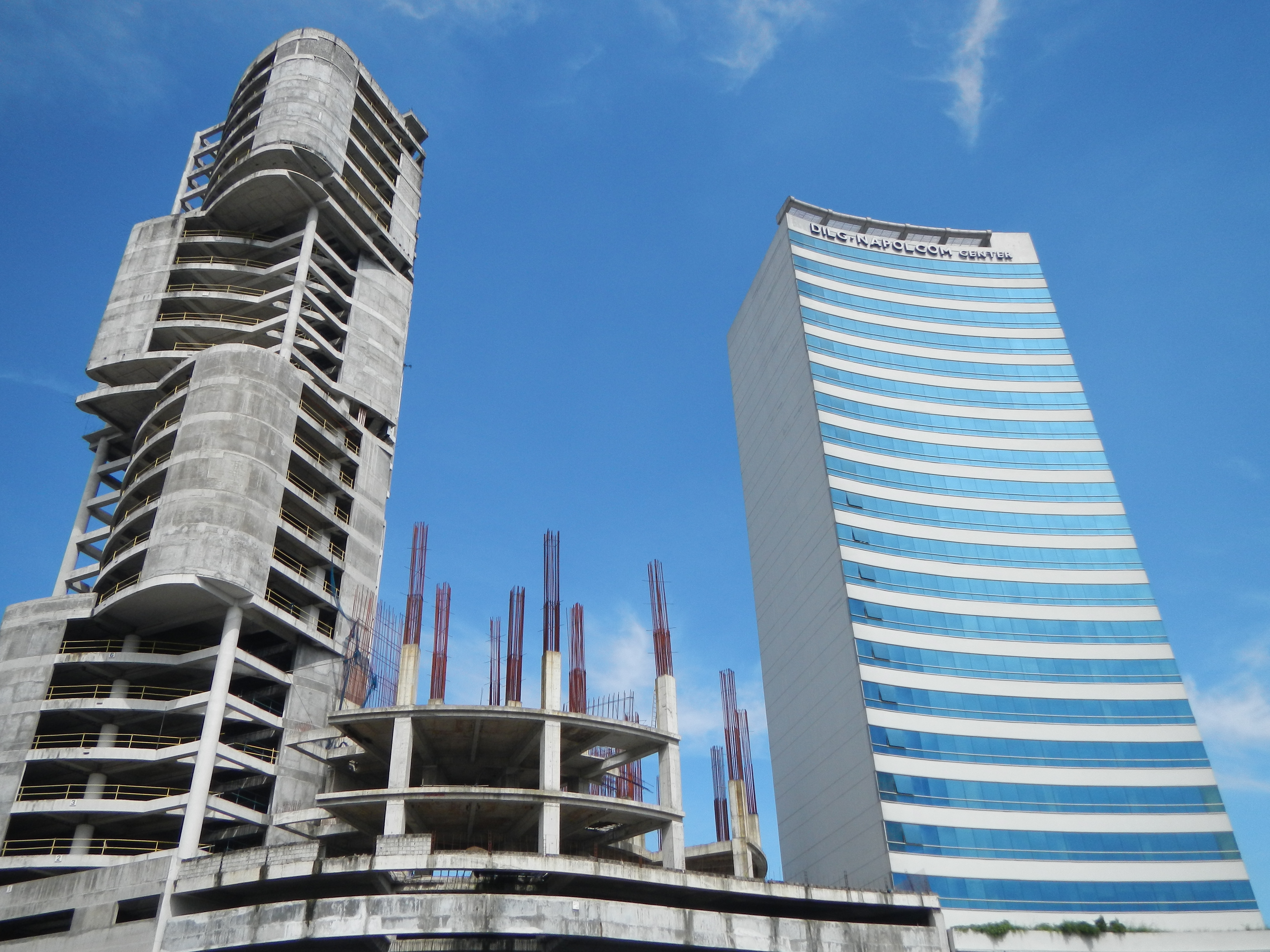
The DILG-Napolcom Center (right) beside the yet to be completed The Skysuites Tower (left), Quezon Avenue, EDSA

The department is currently led by the secretary of the interior and local government, nominated by the president of the Philippines and confirmed by the Commission on Appointments. The secretary is a member of the Cabinet. The current secretary of the interior and local government is Jonvic Remulla.

== History ==
The Department of the Interior and Local Government traces its roots to the Philippine Revolution against the Spanish Empire, specifically the Tejeros Convention of March 22, 1897. Initially the Department of the Interior, it was among the first Cabinet positions of the proposed revolutionary government, wherein General Emilio Aguinaldo was elected President. The leader of Katipunan's Magdiwang faction, Andrés Bonifacio, was elected last as Director of the Interior, but a controversial objection led to the Magdiwang walkout and Bonifacio declining the position. Gen. Pascual Álvarez would be appointed as secretary by Aguinaldo on April 17, 1897, during the Naic Assembly.

The Department of the Interior was officially enshrined on November 1, 1897, upon the promulgation of the Biak-na-Bato Republic, with Isabelo Artacho as secretary. Article XV of the Biak-na-Bato Constitution defined the powers and functions of the department that included statistics, roads and bridges, agriculture, public information and posts, and public order.

Following the American Occupation, the Department of the Interior was among four departments under the Insular Government created by virtue of Philippine Commission Act No. 222. Americans headed the department until 1917, when Rafael Palma was appointed by Governor-General Francis Harrison following the passage of the Jones Law. The Interior Department was tasked with various functions ranging from supervision over local units, forest conservation, public instructions, control and supervision over the police, counter-insurgency, rehabilitation, community development and cooperatives development programs.

At the outbreak of World War II, President Manuel L. Quezon abolished the department via Executive Order 390. It was recreated as part of the Philippine Executive Commission in 1942 under the Japanese Occupation, but again abolished the following year with the establishment of Japanese-controlled Second Philippine Republic. Its secretary before the abolition, José P. Laurel, was elected President by the National Assembly.

The department was reinstated by President Sergio Osmeña months after the country's liberation from Japanese forces in December 1944. It was then merged with the Department of National Defense in July 1945 until President Manuel Roxas' Executive Order No. 94 in 1947, which split the two, and tasked the reorganized Interior Department to administer the Philippine Constabulary and all local political subdivisions, among others.

A 1950 reorganization via Executive Order No. 383 (in pursuance of Republic Act No. 422) by President Elipidio Querido abolished the Interior Department once again. Its functions were transferred to the Office of Local Government (later the Local Government and Civil Affairs Office) under the Office of the President.

On January 6, 1956, under President Ramón Magsaysay, the Presidential Assistant on Community Development (PACD) office was created via Executive Order No. 156, with functions resembling that of the Interior Department sans supervision over the police force. It was renamed the Presidential Arm on Community Development in 1966.

The department was restored on November 7, 1972 under dictator President Ferdinand Marcos with the creation of the Department of Local Government and Community Development (DLGCD). The DLGCD was reorganized as a ministry in the parliamentary Batasang Pambansa in 1978, renamed the Ministry of Local Government in 1982, and became the Department of Local Government (DLG) in 1987 under President Corazon Aquino.

On December 13, 1990, Republic Act No. 6975 placed the Philippine National Police, Bureau of Fire Protection, Bureau of Jail Management and Penology and the Philippine Public Safety College under the reorganized Department of the Interior and Local Government (DILG). The new DILG merged the National Police Commission (NAPOLCOM), and all the bureaus, offices, and operating units of the former DLG under Executive Order No. 262. RA No. 6975 paved the way for the union of local governments and the police force after nearly four decades of separation.

In 2019, Republic Act No. 11292 was passed, starting the Seal of Good Local Governance, an award and recognition program for government units, which the Department of the Intererior and Local Government runs.

== Powers and functions ==
On its website, the department provides it powers and functions as:

- Assist the President in the exercise of general supervision over local governments
- Advise the President in the promulgation of policies, rules, regulations and other issuances on the general supervision over local governments and on public order and safety
- Establish and prescribe rules, regulations and other issuances implementing laws on public order and safety, the general supervision over local governments and the promotion of local autonomy and community empowerment and monitor compliance thereof
- Provide assistance towards legislation regarding local governments, law enforcement and public safety; Establish and prescribe plans, policies, programs and projects to promote peace and order, ensure public safety and further strengthen the administrative, technical and fiscal capabilities of local government offices and personnel
- Formulate plans, policies and programs which will meet local emergencies arising from natural and man-made disasters; Establish a system of coordination and cooperation among the citizenry, local executives and the Department, to ensure effective and efficient delivery of basic services to the public
- Organize, train and equip primarily for the performance of police functions, a police force that is national in scope and civilian in character

== List of secretaries of the interior and local government ==
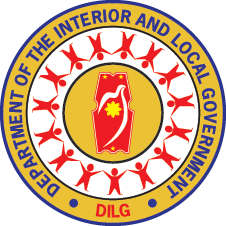
Former seal.

== Organizational structure ==
At present, the department is headed by the secretary of the interior and local government, with the following undersecretaries and assistant secretaries:

- Undersecretary for Barangay Affairs
- Undersecretary for Local Government
- Undersecretary for Mindanao Affairs and Special Concerns
- Undersecretary for Operations
- Undersecretary for Peace and Order
- Undersecretary for External, Legal and Legislative Affairs
- Undersecretary for Project Development Management
- Undersecretary for Plans, Public Affairs and Communications
- Undersecretary for Public Safety
- Assistant Secretary for Administration, Finance and Comptrollership
- Assistant Secretary for Community Participation
- Assistant Secretary for Human Resources Development
- Assistant Secretary for International Relations
- Assistant Secretary for Peace and Order
- Assistant Secretary for Plans and Programs
- Assistant Secretary for Public Safety

Under the Office of the Secretary are the following offices and services:

- Administrative Service
- Central Office Disaster Information Coordinating Center (CODIX)
- Emergency 911 National Office
- Financial and Management Service
- Information Systems and Technology Management Service
- Internal Audit Service
- Legal and Legislative Liaison Service
- Planning Service
- Public Affairs and Communication Service
- Public Assistance and Complaint Center
- Local Government Academy

A regional director is assigned to each of the 18 regions of the Philippines. A DILG Officer is assigned to every Province, Municipality, City, and Barangay.

=== Bureaus ===
The DILG is composed of four bureaus, namely:

- Bureau of Local Government Development (BLGD)
- Bureau of Local Government Supervision (BLGS)
- National Barangay Operations Office (NBOO)
- Office of Project Development Services (OPDS)

=== Leagues ===
Recognized Leagues under the DILG:

- Barangay Councilors' League of the Philippines
- Lady Local Legislators' League of the Philippines
- League of Cities of the Philippines
- League of Municipalities of the Philippines
- League of Provinces of the Philippines
- League of Vice Governors of the Philippines
- Liga ng mga Barangay sa Pilipinas/Association of Barangay Captains
- Metro Manila Councilors' League
- National Movement of Young Legislators
- Philippine Councilors' League
- Provincial Board Members' League of the Philippines
- Sangguniang Kabataan National Federation
- Union of Local Authorities of the Philippines
- Vice Mayors' League of the Philippines
- Philippine League of Secretaries to the Sanggunian

== Attached agencies ==
The following are attached to the DILG:

- Bureau of Fire Protection
- Bureau of Jail Management and Penology
- Local Government Academy
- National Commission on Muslim Filipinos
- National Police Commission (NAPOLCOM)
  - Philippine National Police
- National Youth Commission
- Philippine Commission on Women
- Philippine Public Safety College
