= Manila Waldorf School =

Waldorf school in Rizal, Philippines

Coordinates: 14°40′36″N 121°09′33″E

Manila Waldorf School is the first Waldorf school in the Philippines. The school was founded in 1994 as a kindergarten, and currently has over 200 students from kindergarten up to Grade 12.

The Manila Waldorf School, Inc. (MWSI) is a private non-stock, non-profit educational foundation recognized by the Department of Education since 1994. MWSI is part of the non-traditional educational movement. Its philosophy is based on the teachings of the Austrian philosopher Dr. Rudolf Steiner on the development stages of childhood and adolescence. MWSI is recognized by the Goetheanum in Dornach, Switzerland as an authentic Waldorf or Steiner school.

MWSI offers Parent-Toddler (Paslitan); Kindergarten (Palaruan); Grade School (Paaralan); and High School (Kawayan). MWSI is located in Timberland Heights, San Mateo, Rizal just 15 minutes away from the Batansang Pambansa in Quezon City. It also has a satellite kindergarten school situated in E. Rodriguez, Quezon City.
