= Seal of Good Local Governance =

The Seal of Good Local Governance (SGLG) is an award and recognition program for government units in the Philippines. The program is designed to motivate local governments to improve their work in administration, financial accountability, disaster readiness, health services, social protection, education, environmental management and other areas of governance. Republic Act No. 11292, also called the Seal of Good Local Governance Act of 2019, made the program official.

The Department of the Interior and Local Government (DILG) runs this program. They evaluate local government units.

== History ==
The SGLG grew out of an initiative called the Seal of Good Housekeeping, also run by DILG. That program focused on transparency and accountability. Over time, the scope of the program expanded to include areas of public service and governance.

On April 12, 2019, the government signed Republic Act No. 11292 into law. This law gave SGLG a legal foundation and created the Council of Good Local Governance and the Seal of Good Local Governance Fund.

== Objectives ==
The main goal is to encourage government units to be more transparent and responsible when using public funds. It also aims to improve service delivery.

== Assessment criteria ==
The SGLG measures government units based on specific areas of governance.

Assessment criteria change when DILG updates its guidelines. For the 2025 assessment, DILG listed ten governance areas. Under these rules, local government units must meet all ten standards to earn the seal.

== Implementation ==
The DILG carries out assessments using its standard guidelines and evaluation indicators. They must meet all the requirements to get recognition.

The program links to government incentives. The Performance Challenge Fund is a grant program that supports development projects in local government units. Eligibility for the fund is tied to SGLG governance ratings.

== Challenges and research ==
The SGLG rollout brought attention to issues such as the difficulty of meeting assessment standards, the capacity of local governments and the impact of changing governance rules. The program’s policy design has changed over time, changing criteria, lowering passing rates and a lack of resources for governments to comply.

The researchers suggested that the government address resource constraints, change assessment criteria carefully and improve the evaluation process. These steps could help local governments better handle governance.

Studies on the SGLG and the Performance Challenge Fund examined how governance assessment connects with government incentives. These studies help explain how performance standards and financial support can work together to improve administration.
