= Jose F. Diaz Memorial National High School =

Public high school in Rizal, Philippines

Jose F. Diaz Memorial National High School (JFDMNHS)

Location
- Rosal Street, Vista Hermosa, Gulod Malaya; Calabarzon; San Mateo, Rizal 1850; Philippines
- Coordinates: 14°40′42″N 121°07′42″E

Information
- Former names: Sto. Niño National High School (1997); Jose F. Diaz Memorial National High School (present)
- Type: Public
- Established: 1997
- School number: 301460
- Principal: Relita V. Reyes
- Grades: 7 to 12
- Website: www.jfdmnhs.com

Jose F. Diaz Memorial National High School (JFDMNHS), formerly known as Sto. Niño National High School and founded in 1997, is a public secondary school located in San Mateo, Rizal, Philippines. It is recognized by the Department of Education (DepEd).

== History ==
Jose F. Diaz Memorial National High School (JFDMNHS) is named after the former mayor of San Mateo formerly known as Sto. Niño High School. It is a Department of Education (DepEd) managed urban Secondary Public School located in Vista Hermosa Subd., F Gulod Malaya, 1850 San Mateo, Rizal, Philippines.

== Senior High programs ==
  - STEM (Science, Technology, Engineering, Mathematics)
  - GAS (General Academic Strand)
  - HUMMS (Humanities and Social Sciences)
  - ABM (Accountancy, Business, Management)
  - TVL (Technical-Vocational-Livelihood Track)
  - ICT (Information Communication and Technology) or ICT Strand

== Secondary programs ==
=== Senior High School ===
- Grade 11
- Grade 12

=== Junior High School ===
- Grade 7-10
