= National Police Commission (Philippines) =

Philippine government agency

- Komisyon sa Pambansang Pulisya
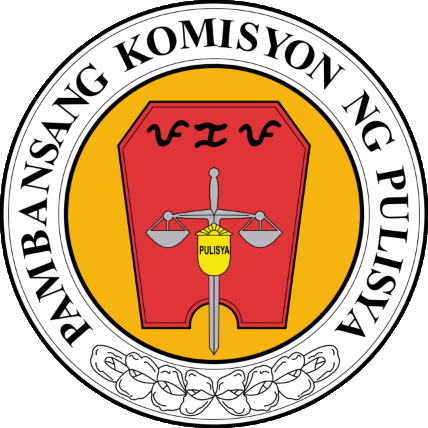

Department overview
- Formed: 1966|08|10
- Jurisdiction: Government of the Philippines
- Headquarters: DILG-NAPOLCOM Center, EDSA cor. Quezon Avenue, West Triangle, Quezon City, 1104 Philippines; 14°38′41″N 121°02′12″E
- Employees: 1,180 (2024)
- Annual budget: ₱1.91 billion (2023)
- Department executives: Juanito Victor C. Remulla Jr., DILG Secretary, Chairman; Atty. Rafael Vicente R. Calinisan, Vice-Chairman and Executive Officer; PGEN Jose Melencio Nartatez, Ex-Officio Commissioner and Chief, PNP
- Parent department: Department of the Interior and Local Government
- Child Department: Philippine National Police
- Website: www.napolcom.gov.ph

The National Police Commission (NAPOLCOM; Filipino: Komisyon sa Pambansang Pulisya) is an agency attached to the Department of the Interior and Local Government (DILG) responsible for the administrative control and operational supervision of the Philippine National Police (PNP). It has the authority to conduct police entrance examinations, investigate complaints against police anomalies and irregularities, and summarily dismiss erring police officers.

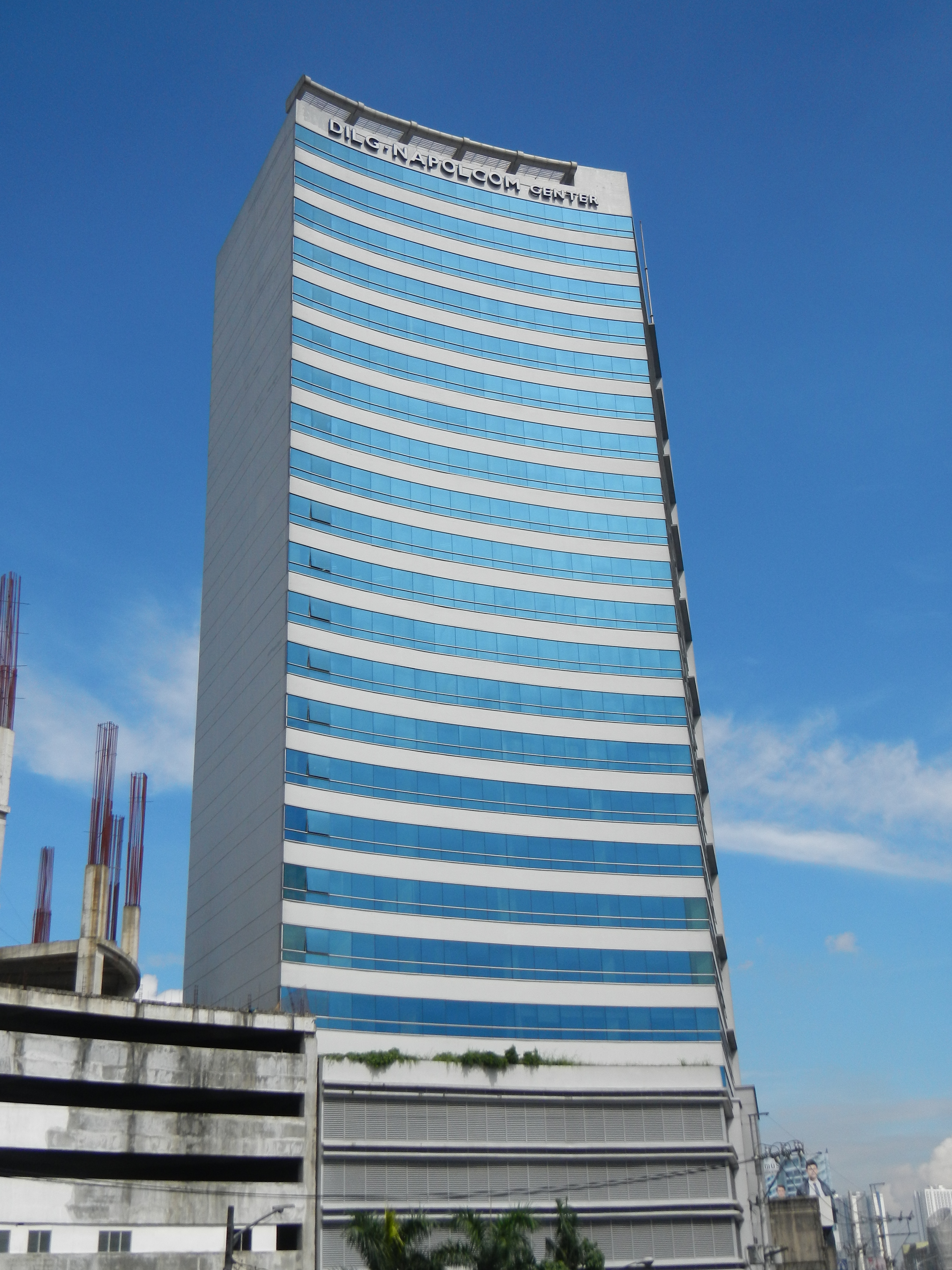
The DILG–NAPOLCOM Center, headquarters of the NAPOLCOM and its principal tenant and parent agency, the DILG, is located at the corner of Epifanio Delos Santos Avenue and Quezon Avenue, Quezon City, Philippines.

== History ==
The NAPOLCOM traces its roots from the creation of the Police Commission (POLCOM) under Republic Act 4864 (Police Act of 1966). It was reorganized as the National Police Commission (NAPOLCOM) in 1972.

The NAPOLCOM was under the Office of the President before being transferred to the Ministry of National Defense in 1975 by virtue of Presidential Decree 765 (Police Integration Law). In 1980, the agency was returned to the Office of the President by Executive Order No. 1040.

In 1990, with the establishment of the Philippine National Police (PNP), the present NAPOLCOM was created within the newly reorganized Department of the Interior and Local Government (DILG) under Republic Act No. 6975. The agency's authority was further strengthened and expanded by Republic Act No. 8551, otherwise known as 'Philippine National Police Reform and Reorganization Act of 1998'. Republic Act 8551 also amended Republic Act 6975, carving NAPOLCOM out of the DILG organization and making it simply an attached agency. The attachment of NAPOLCOM to DILG preserves it independence as the sole administrator and controller of the national police force under Article XVI, Section 6 of the 1987 Philippine Constitution.

== Organization ==
The NAPOLCOM as a collegial body is composed of an ex-officio chairperson, four regular Commissioners, and the PNP Chief as ex-officio member, one of whom is designated by the President as the vice-chairperson. The DILG Secretary is the ex-officio chairperson, while the vice-chairperson is the executive officer of the commission.

The ex-officio Chairperson and four Commissioners constitute the Commission Proper which serves as the governing body thereof.

The staff services of the commission are as follows:

- Planning and Research Service (PRS) provides technical services to the Commission in areas of overall policy formulation, strategic and operational planning, management systems or procedures, evaluation and monitoring of the commission's programs, projects and internal operations; and conducts thorough research and analysis on social and economic condition affecting peace and order in the country.
- Legal Affairs Service (LAS) provides the commission with efficient and effective service as legal counsel of the commission; draft or studies contracts affecting the commission and submit appropriate recommendations pertaining thereto; and render legal opinions arising from the administration and operation of the Philippine National Police and the commission.
- Crime Prevention and Coordination Service (CPCS) undertakes criminological researches and studies; formulates a national crime prevention plan; develop a crime prevention and information program; and provide editorial direction for all criminology research and crime prevention publications.
- Personnel and Administrative Service (PAS) performs personnel functions for the commission; administers the entrance and promotional examinations for policemen, provides the necessary services relating to records, correspondence, supplies, property and equipment, security and general services, and the maintenance and utilization of facilities; provides services relating to manpower, career planning and development, personnel transactions and employee welfare.
- Inspection, Monitoring and Investigation Service (IMIS) conducts continuous inspection and management audit of personnel, facilities and operations at all levels of command of the PNP; monitors the implementation of the commission's programs and projects relative to law enforcement; and monitors and investigates police anomalies and irregularities. This is the Law enforcement Unit of the commission.
- Installations and Logistics Service (ILS) reviews the commission's plans and programs and formulates policies and procedures regarding acquisition, inventory, control, distribution, maintenance and disposal of supplies and oversees the implementation of programs on transportation facilities and installations and the procurement and maintenance of supplies and equipment.
- Financial Service (FS) provides the commission with staff advice and assistance on budgetary and financial matters, including the overseeing of the processing and disbursement of funds pertaining to the scholarship program and surviving children of deceased and/or permanently incapacitated PNP personnel.

The ex-officio chairperson and four commissioners constitute the Commission Proper which serves as the governing body of NAPOLCOM. The incumbent chairperson is DILG Secretary Jonvic Remulla.

The NAPOLCOM also has disciplinary appellate boards and various staff services as well as Seventeen regional offices which are strategically located in the different regional centers of the country.

== Regional Offices ==
The Regional Offices of the commission are located in the following cities:

Region	Regional Office Location	Police Office Jurisdictions
Cordillera (CAR)	City of Baguio	Provinces of Abra, Apayao, Benguet, Ifugao, Kalinga, Mountain Province and the independent City of Baguio
National Capital Region (NCR)	City of Makati	Independent Cities of Caloocan, Las Piñas, Makati, Malabon, Mandaluyong, Manila, Marikina, Muntinlupa, Navotas, Parañaque, Pasay, Pasig, Quezon City, San Juan, Taguig, Valenzuela and Municipality of Pateros
I (Ilocos)	City of San Fernando, La Union	Provinces of Ilocos Norte, Ilocos Sur, La Union, and Pangasinan and the independent City of Dagupan
II (Cagayan Valley)	City of Tuguegarao, Cagayan	Provinces of Batanes, Cagayan, Isabela, Nueva Vizcaya, and Quirino, and the independent City of Santiago
III (Central Luzon)	City of San Fernando, Pampanga	Provinces of Aurora, Bataan, Bulacan, Nueva Ecija, Pampanga, Tarlac, and Zambales, and the independent Cities of Angeles and Olongapo
IV-A (Calabarzon)	City of Calamba, Laguna	Provinces of Batangas, Cavite, Laguna, Quezon, and Rizal, and the independent City of Lucena
IV-B (Mimaropa)	City of Calamba, Laguna	Provinces of Marinduque, Occidental Mindoro, Oriental Mindoro, Palawan, and Romblon and the Independent City of Puerto Princesa
V (Bicol)	City of Legazpi, Albay	Provinces of Albay, Camarines Norte, Camarines Sur, Catanduanes, Masbate, and Sorsogon, and the independent City of Naga
VI (Western Visayas)	City of Iloilo	Provinces of Aklan, Antique, Capiz, Guimaras, and Iloilo, and Independent City of Iloilo
VII (Central Visayas)	City of Cebu	Provinces of Cebu and Bohol and the independent Cities of Cebu, Lapu-Lapu and Mandaue
VIII (Eastern Visayas)	City of Tacloban, Leyte	Provinces of Biliran, Eastern Samar, Leyte, Northern Samar, Samar (Western Samar), and Southern Leyte, and independent Cities of Ormoc and Tacloban
IX (Zamboanga Peninsula)	City of Pagadian, Zamboanga del Sur	Provinces of Sulu, Zamboanga del Norte, Zamboanga del Sur, and Zamboanga Sibugay, and the Cities of Isabela and Zamboanga
X (Northern Mindanao)	City of Cagayan de Oro	Provinces of Bukidnon, Camiguin, Lanao del Norte, Misamis Occidental, and Misamis Oriental and the independent Cities of Cagayan de Oro and Iligan
XI (Davao)	City of Davao	Provinces of Davao de Oro, Davao del Norte, Davao del Sur, Davao Occidental, and Davao Oriental and the independent City of Davao
XII (Soccsksargen)	City of Koronadal, South Cotabato	Provinces of Cotabato (except Special Geographic Areas), South Cotabato, Sarangani, Sultan Kudarat and the independent City of General Santos
XIII (Caraga)	City of Butuan	Provinces of Agusan del Norte, Agusan del Sur, Dinagat Islands, Surigao del Norte, and Surigao del Sur and the independent City of Butuan
Bangsamoro (BARMM)	City of Cotabato	Provinces of Basilan (except Isabela City), Lanao del Sur, Maguindanao del Norte, Maguindanao del Sur, Tawi-Tawi and the Cities of Cotabato, Lamitan and Marawi, and the Special Geographic Areas in Cotabato
Negros (NIR)	City of Bacolod, Negros Occidental	Provinces of Negros Occidental, Negros Oriental, and Siquijor, and the independent City of Bacolod
