= Rizal's 3rd congressional district =

Legislative district of the Philippines

- Constituency for the House of Representatives of the Philippines
- Location of the district (San Mateo) within Rizal

- Location of Rizal within the Philippines
- Province: Rizal
- Region: Calabarzon
- Population: 273,306 (2020)
- Electorate: 134,335 (2025)
- Major settlements: San Mateo
- Area: 55.09 km^{2} (21.27 sq mi)

Current constituency
- Created: 2021
- Representative: Jose Arturo S. Garcia, Jr.
- Political party: NPC
- Congressional bloc: Majority

Rizal's 3rd congressional district is one of the four congressional districts of the Philippines in the province of Rizal. It has been represented in the House of Representatives since 2022. The district consists of the north-western municipality of San Mateo. It is currently represented in the 20th Congress by Jose Arturo "Jojo" S. Garcia, Jr. of the Nationalist People's Coalition, who is its first representative since its creation.

== Representation history ==
#	Image	Member	Tenure		Congress	Party	Electoral history	Constituent LGUs
#	Image	Member	Start	End	Congress	Party	Electoral history	Constituent LGUs
=== Rizal's 3rd district for the House of Representatives of the Philippines ===
District created April 12, 2021 from Rizal's 2nd district.
1		Jose Arturo S. Garcia, Jr.	June 30, 2022	Incumbent	19th	NPC	Elected in 2022.	2022–present San Mateo
1		Jose Arturo S. Garcia, Jr.	June 30, 2022	Incumbent	20th	NPC	Re-elected in 2025.	2022–present San Mateo

== Election results ==
=== 2025 ===
2025 Philippine House of Representatives election in Rizal's 3rd district
Party	Candidate	Votes	%
NPC	Jojo Garcia	67,417	66.34
AKAY	Paeng Diaz	34,210	33.66
Valid ballots		101,627	94.85
Invalid or blank votes		5,520	5.15
Total votes		107,147	100.00
NPC hold			

=== 2022 ===
2022 Philippine House of Representatives election in the 3rd district of Rizal
Party	Candidate	Votes	%
NPC	Jose Arturo S. Garcia, Jr.	48,640	53.32
PDP–Laban	Cristina Diaz	36,673	40.20
Aksyon	Ma. Cristina Diaz	5,894	6.46
Valid ballots		91,207	94.55
Invalid or blank votes		5,576	5.45
Total votes		96,783	100.00
NPC win (new seat)			

== See also ==
- Legislative districts of Rizal
