= The Skysuites Tower =

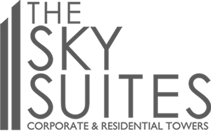

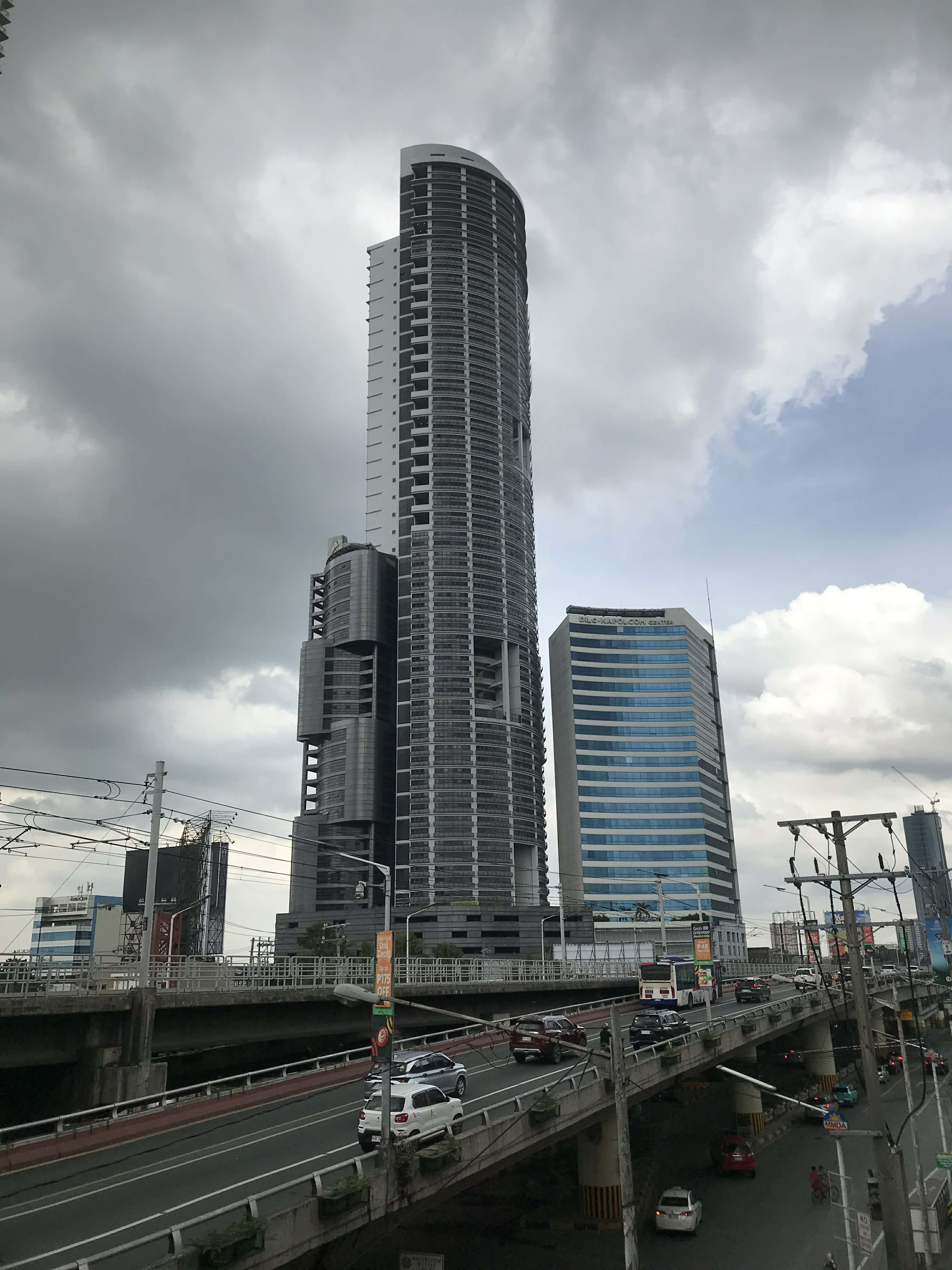
- Interactive map of the The Skysuites Tower area
- Former names: GA Sky Suites

General information
- Status: Completed
- Type: Mixed-use
- Location: Quezon City, Epifanio delos Santos Avenue Cor. Quezon Avenue, Philippines
- Coordinates: 14°38′38″N 121°02′11″E
- Construction started: 2007
- Completed: 2019
- Owner: Globe Asiatique (2007-2010) RCBC (2010-2014) DoubleDragon Properties (since 2014)

Height
- Height: 223 m (732 ft)

Technical details
- Floor count: 38
- Grounds: 2,811.60 square meters (30,264 sq ft)

Design and construction
- Developer: Globe Asiatique (2007-2010) DoubleDragon Properties (since 2014)

Website
- www.theskysuitestowers.com

The Skysuites Tower, also known as The Sky Suites Corporate & Residential Towers, is a twin building complex in Quezon City. Construction of the building was on hold for a while after its original owner, Globe Asiatique, got involved in a scam. The new owner, DoubleDragon Properties, acquired the building in 2014 and resumed construction of the building. The complex was completed in 2019.

== Construction ==
Globe Asiatique commenced the construction of the building, then named G.A. Sky Suites, in 2007. Construction of the nearly complete building was put into hold when the G.A. Sky Suites was foreclosed by the Rizal Commercial Banking Corporation (RCBC) in September 2010 after a ₱6.6 billion scam case was filed on Delfin Lee, the owner of Globe Asiatique. Lee was accused of devising ghost borrowers to gain ₱6.6 billion worth of housing loans from Pag-IBIG Fund. The land title of the building was transferred to RCBC in December 2010.

The building in 2018

In May 2014, DoubleDragon Properties began efforts to acquire the building from RCBC. Double Dragon announced in September 2014 that it has fully acquired the building after a 90 day due diligence period. The building was renamed as The Sky Suites Corporate & Residential Towers, or simply the Skysuites Tower.

== Architecture and design ==
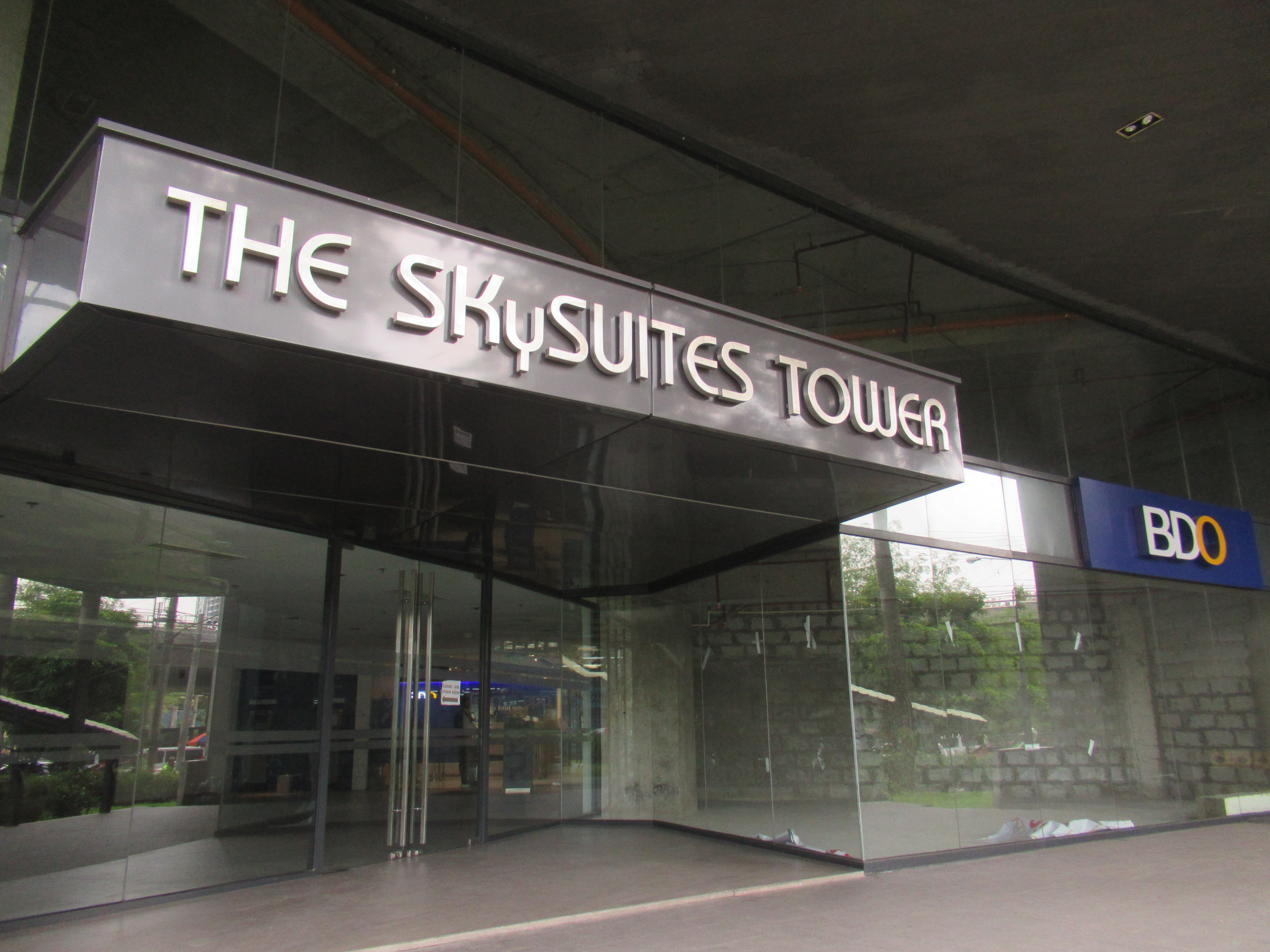
Groundfloor in 2023

The Skysuites Tower is composed of a 38-storey semi-circular tower and a 26-storey curvilinear tower upon a 2,812 square meter lot at the junction of EDSA and Quezon Avenue. The semi-circular tower is for residential use and the curvilinear tower is for office use. The two towers are connected by a parking and commercial podium. Its features include garden and podium lofts.
