= Napindan =

Barangay in Taguig, Metro Manila, Philippines

- Barangay
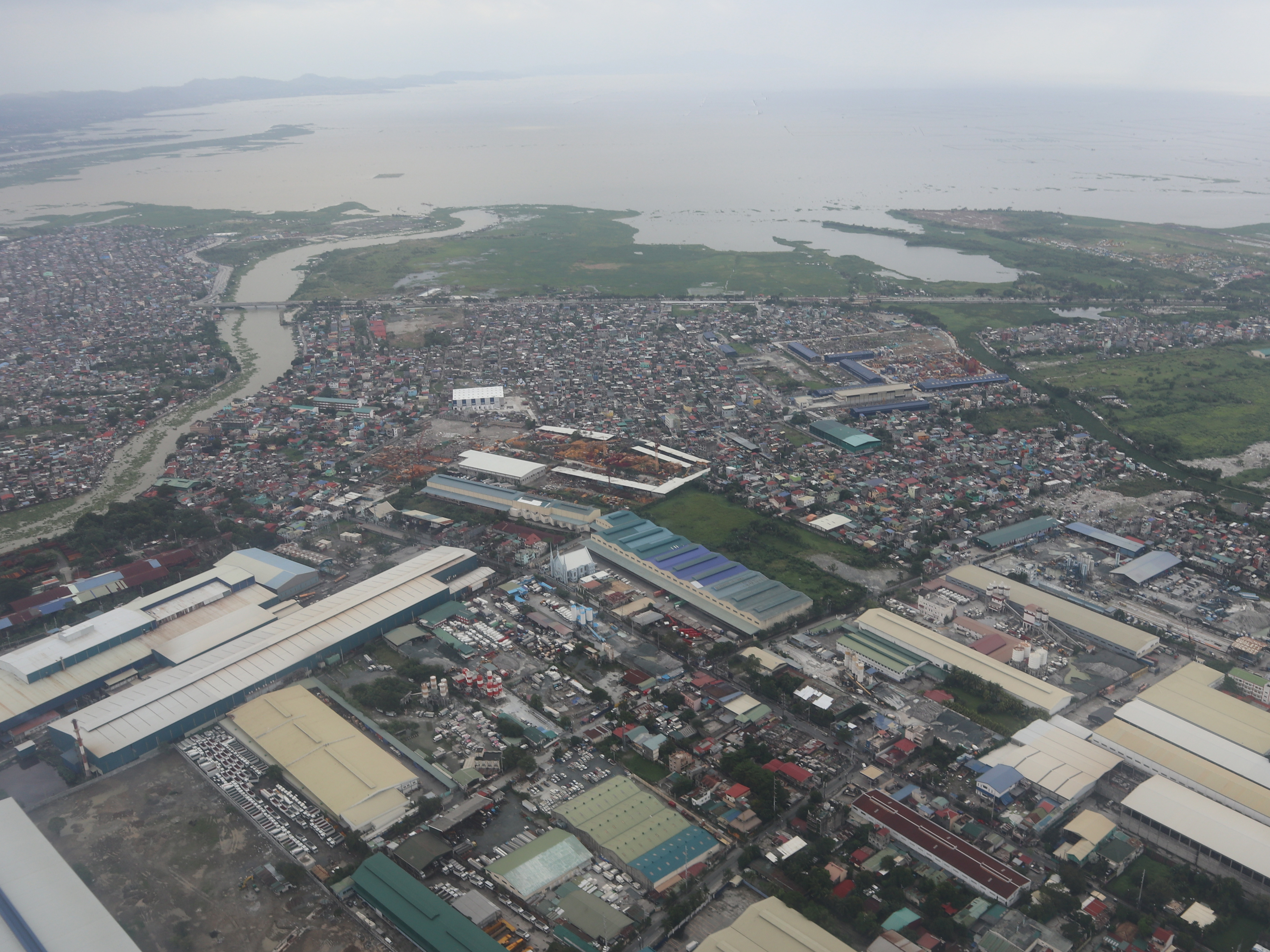
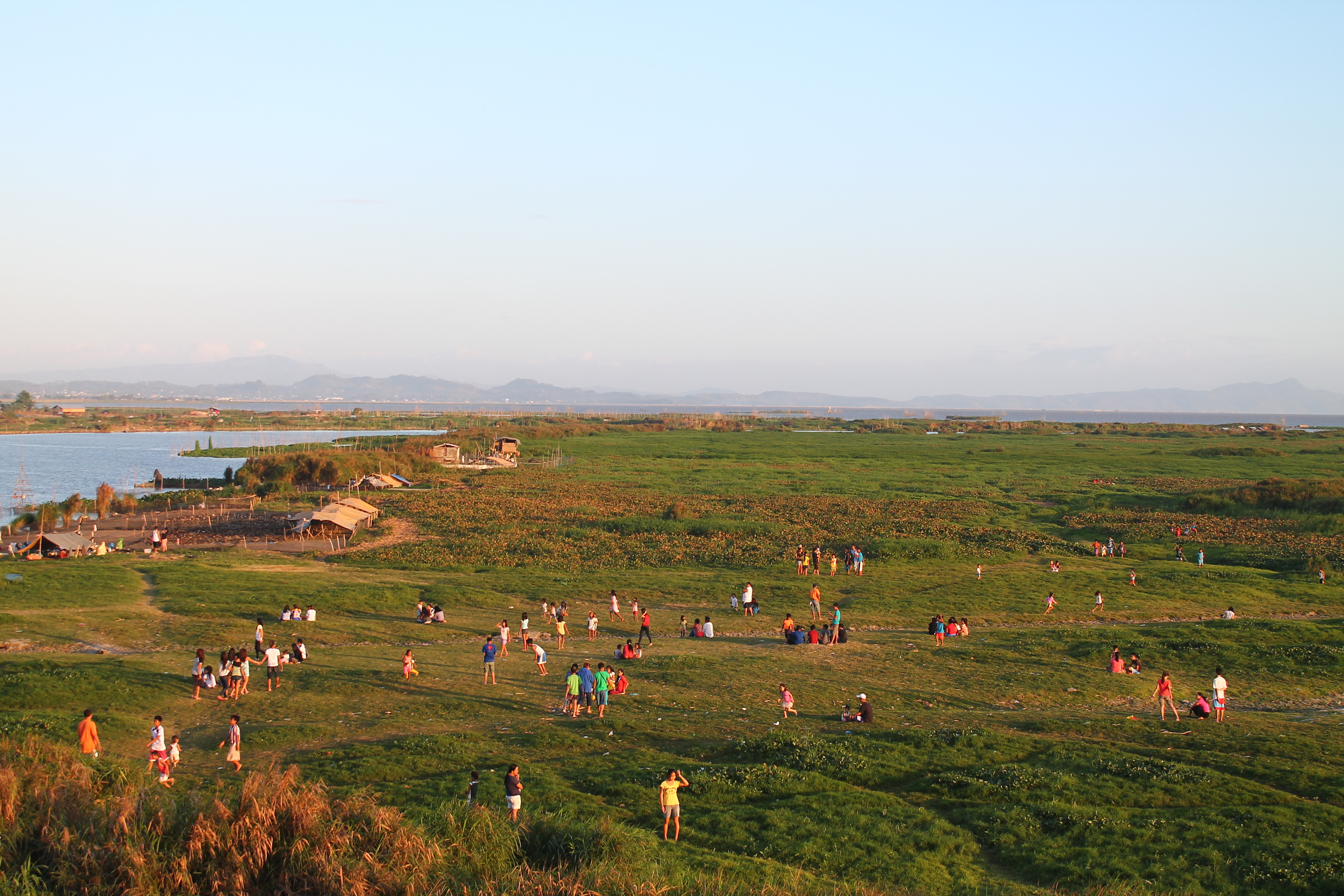
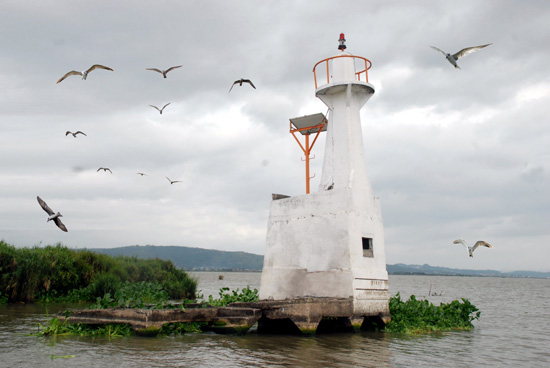
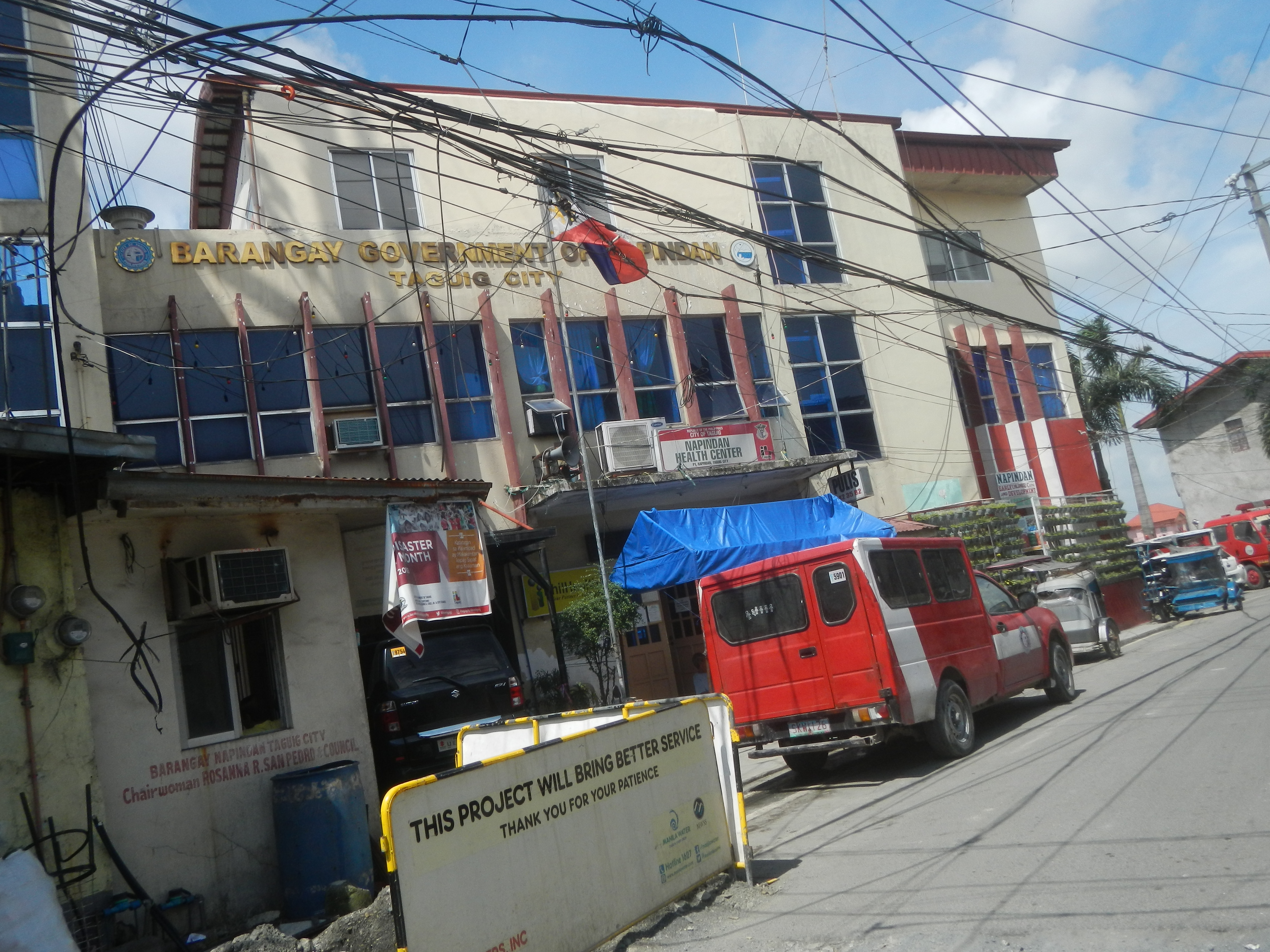
- Aerial view of Napindan Scenery near Pasig River Napindan Lighthouse Barangay hall

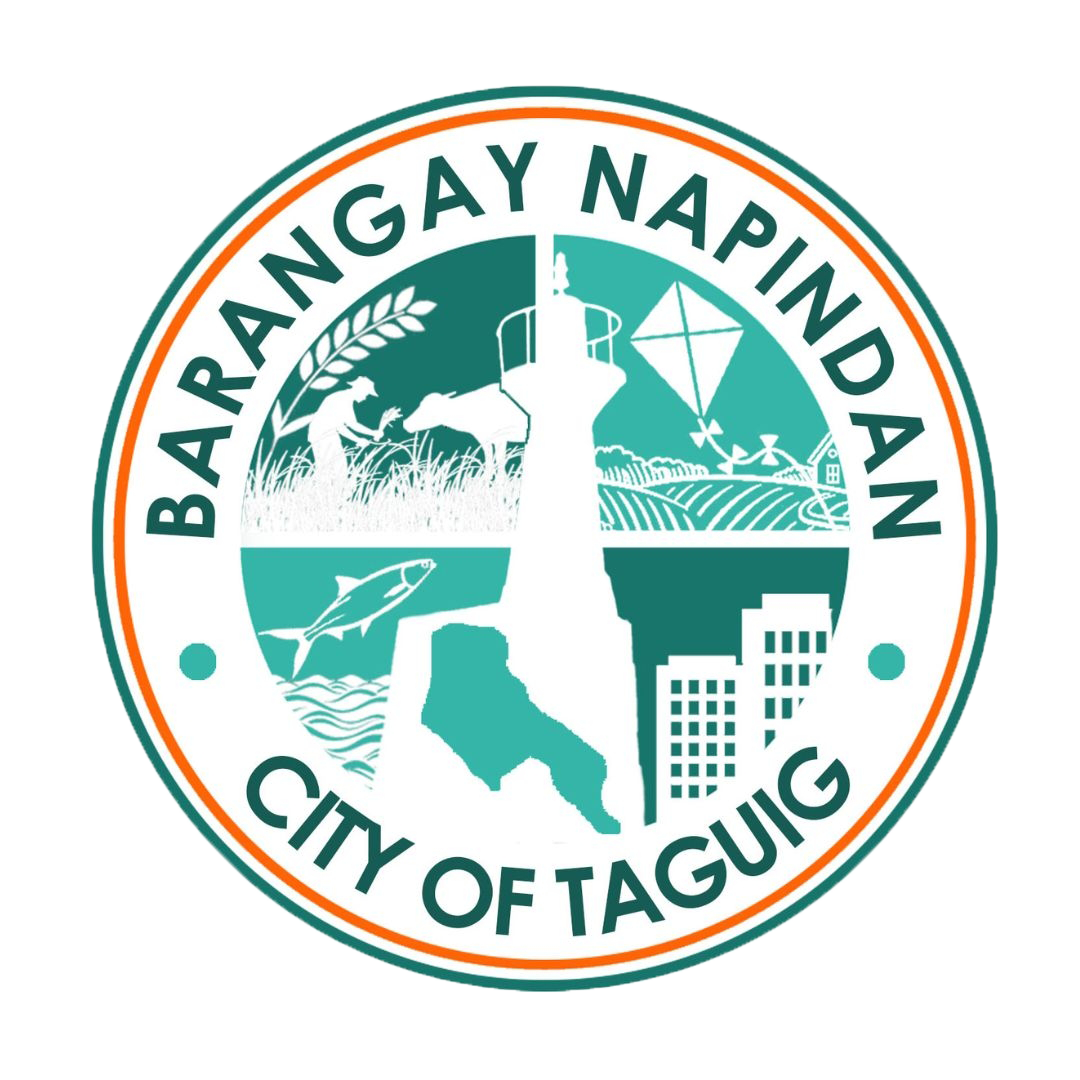
- Seal
- Interactive map of Napindan
- Location of Napindan within Metro Manila Location of Napindan within Luzon Location of Napindan within the Philippines
- Coordinates: 14°32′24.92″N 121°5′45.89″E
- Country: Philippines
- Region: Metro Manila
- City: Taguig
- District: District 1

Government
  - Type: Sangguniang Barangay
  - Barangay Captain: Gerome Michael San Pedro
  - Barangay Councilor: John-John Bautista; Andy Geronimo; Carlito Bernabe; Erick Esguerra; Glenmore Talampas; Christopher Dela Paz; Rodelio Bernardo
  - Sangguniang Kabataan Chairperson: Kaye Dominique Panganiban

Area
  - Total: 2.7 km^{2} (1.0 sq mi)

Population (2024)
  - Total: 27,635
- Time zone: UTC+08:00
- Area code: 02

Napindan, officially Barangay Napindan, is one of the 38 barangays of Taguig, Philippines. As of the 2024 census, the population was 27,635. It was one of the earlier barrios that was added to Taguig during the Spanish colonial period.

== Etymology ==
According to Vocabulario de la lengua tagala (1754), the name "Napindan" was derived from the Tagalog word pindan, which is a synonym of the words pinid (Tagalog pronunciation: [pɪˈn̪id̪̚]) or sarado (Tagalog pronunciation: [sɐˈɾaː.d̪o]), both meaning "closed". During the Spanish colonial period in the Philippines, merchants travelling in and out of Laguna de Bay via Napindan had issues with the formation of sandbars that blocked or clogged the waterway.

The name was also meant "being pierced through", which was attributed to the periodical action of the lake piercing through the land area where the barangay is presently located. According to a legend, based on the barangay's profile on the official website of Taguig, the son of a datu from Tipas arrived at the area, which at that time was an island due to surrounding creeks and rivers, and was abducted by bandits. He was then killed and pierced (Filipino: pinindang) on a bamboo branch. The datu's forces attacked the bandits and avenged his death by piercing them as well.

== History ==
Before the arrival of Spaniards to the Philippines, a settlement already existed in the area now known as Napindan, which became active in commerce and migration. During the Spanish rule of the country, Napindan became one of the five new barrios that was added to the original nine barrios of Taguig. On the eve of May 9, 1896, a meeting consisting of Andrés Bonifacio, Emilio Aguinaldo, Pío Valenzuela, and several high-ranking commanders of the Katipunan took place in a lighthouse located at the barrio, where they listened to Valenzuela's report of his visit to José Rizal, who was exiled in Dapitan, regarding Rizal's advise about their planned revolution against the Spaniards. Following the country's independence from Spain on June 12, 1898, Napindan was placed under Pedro Esguerra as the village president (Filipino: pangulo ng nayon).

During the Battle of Taguig on March 19, 1899, as part of the Philippine-American War, USS Laguna de Bay of the United States Asiatic Squadron destroyed the lighthouse to deprive the Katipunan command and control over the area. On March 29, 1900, during the American rule of the country, Taguig was established as an independent municipality, in which Napindan remained as one of its barrios. On August 26, 1920, the politicians from the barrio, as well as from Calzada, Ibayo, Palingon, and Tipas, filed a petition to then-Governor General Francis Burton Harrison to separate the five barrios from Taguig to form a new municipality named as Tipas. However, it was denied due to lack of financing and economic stability, as well as it would weaken Taguig.

Napindan was converted into a barangay by the virtue of Presidential Decree No. 557 signed by then-President Ferdinand Marcos on September 21, 1974.

== Geography ==
Napindan has a total land area of 2.7 square kilometers (270 hectares). It is bordered to the north by Pasig and Taytay, Rizal, to the south by Palingon and Laguna de Bay, to the east by Taytay and the lake, and to the west by Ibayo-Tipas and Palingon. The barangay is located near the portion of Napindan Channel, a channel that connects Laguna de Bay and Manila Bay.

== Demographics ==
Historical population
Year	Population	±%
1903	252	—
1918	359	+42.5%
1960	1,044	+190.8%
1970^{a}	2,400	+129.9%
1975	3,098	+29.1%
1980	4,103	+32.4%
1985^{b}	—	—
1990	5,371	—
1995	6,630	+23.4%
2000	9,751	+47.1%
2007^{c}	11,623	+19.2%
2010	13,354	+14.9%
2015	19,346	+44.9%
2020	24,437	+26.3%
2024	27,635	+13.1%
^{a} The Philippines began to conduct census every five years starting 1970^{b} No census was held in 1985 due to a political and economic crisis^{c} Census was delayed from the original 2005 due to the reenacted budget that lasted until 2006; Source: United States Bureau of the Census (1903 census), Census Office of the Philippine Islands (1918 census), Bureau of the Census and Statistics (1960 census), National Census and Statistics Office (1970, 1975, 1980, and 1990 census), National Statistics Office (1995, 2000, 2007, and 2010 census), and Philippine Statistics Authority (2015 and 2020 census)

As of the 2024 Philippine census, there were 27,635 residents of Napindan.
