= Napindan Lighthouse =

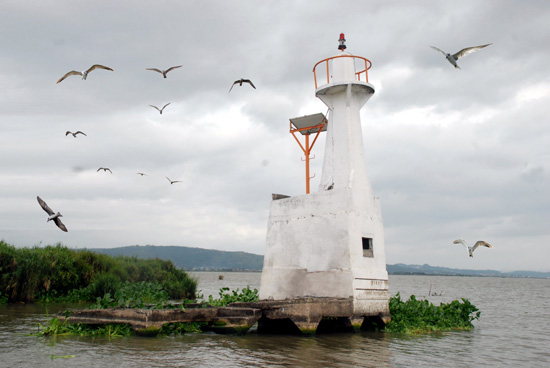
- Location: Taguig, Rizal, Philippines
- Coordinates: 14°31′14″N 121°06′57.8″E

The Napindan Lighthouse (Filipino: Parola ng Napindan) was a lighthouse in Taguig, Rizal (present day Metro Manila). It served as a meeting point for the Katipunan, a revolutionary group that led the Philippine Independence movement. It was destroyed during the Philippine–American War.

== Background ==
The Napindan Lighthouse (Parola ng Napindan) is a named used by historians to refer to a former lighthouse situated at the mouth of Napindan Channel, a vantage point of the Pasig River and Laguna de Bay. The site of the former lighthouse is in present-day Barangay Napindan in Taguig. There is no known extant photograph of the lighthouse.

=== Philippine Revolution ===
According to local historians of both the cities of Taguig and Pasig, the lighthouse was the first site where Katipunan leaders Andrés Bonifacio and Emilio Aguinaldo met with fellow revolutionaries on the night of May 29, 1896 to launch an armed revolution against the Spanish colonial administration over the Philippines. The ensuing Cry of Pugad Lawin occurred in August 1896 in its wake, and is widely regarded as the start of the Philippine Revolution.

At the lighthouse, Katipunan members were briefed by Pío Valenzuela regarding his dialogue with reformist writer José Rizal over the later's opinion on a revolution. Valenzuela reported that for a revolution to succeed, they must maintain relations with wealthy traders, mobilize sympathizers to join the revolution, secure foreign government support, and enlist the service of Antonio Luna, a military commander with training in peninsular Spain. It was during their meeting at the lighthouse, that the Katipunan decided to launch a revolution and planned to start the uprising following an onslaught of a typhoon. The revolution was started earlier than planned with the discovery of the Katipunan by Spanish colonial authorities.

=== Philippine-American War and destruction ===
During the Philippine–American War, the Katipunan used the site again as a command center. During the Battle of Taguig, the lighthouse was destroyed on March 19, 1899, by an American ship, the USS Laguna de Bay.

== Replacement ==
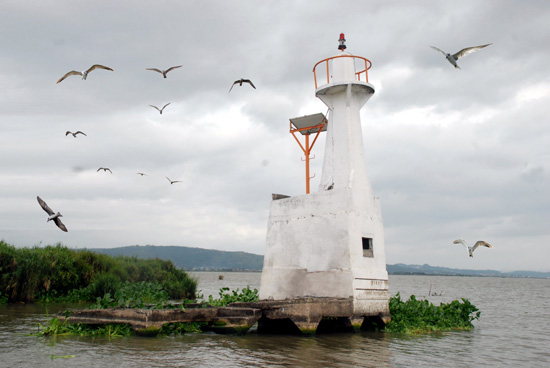
The structure which replaced the old Napindan Lighthouse. The structure is also referred to with the same name.

A small concrete structure with a solar-power beacon was built by the Philippine Coast Guard to aid marine vessels entering the Pasig River from Laguna de Bay and vice versa. Nevertheless, the structure is presently classified as "permanently closed" pending a proposed restoration.
