= Valenzuela City Convention Center =

Convention center in Valenzuela, Philippines

Coordinates: 14°41′38″N 120°58′10″E

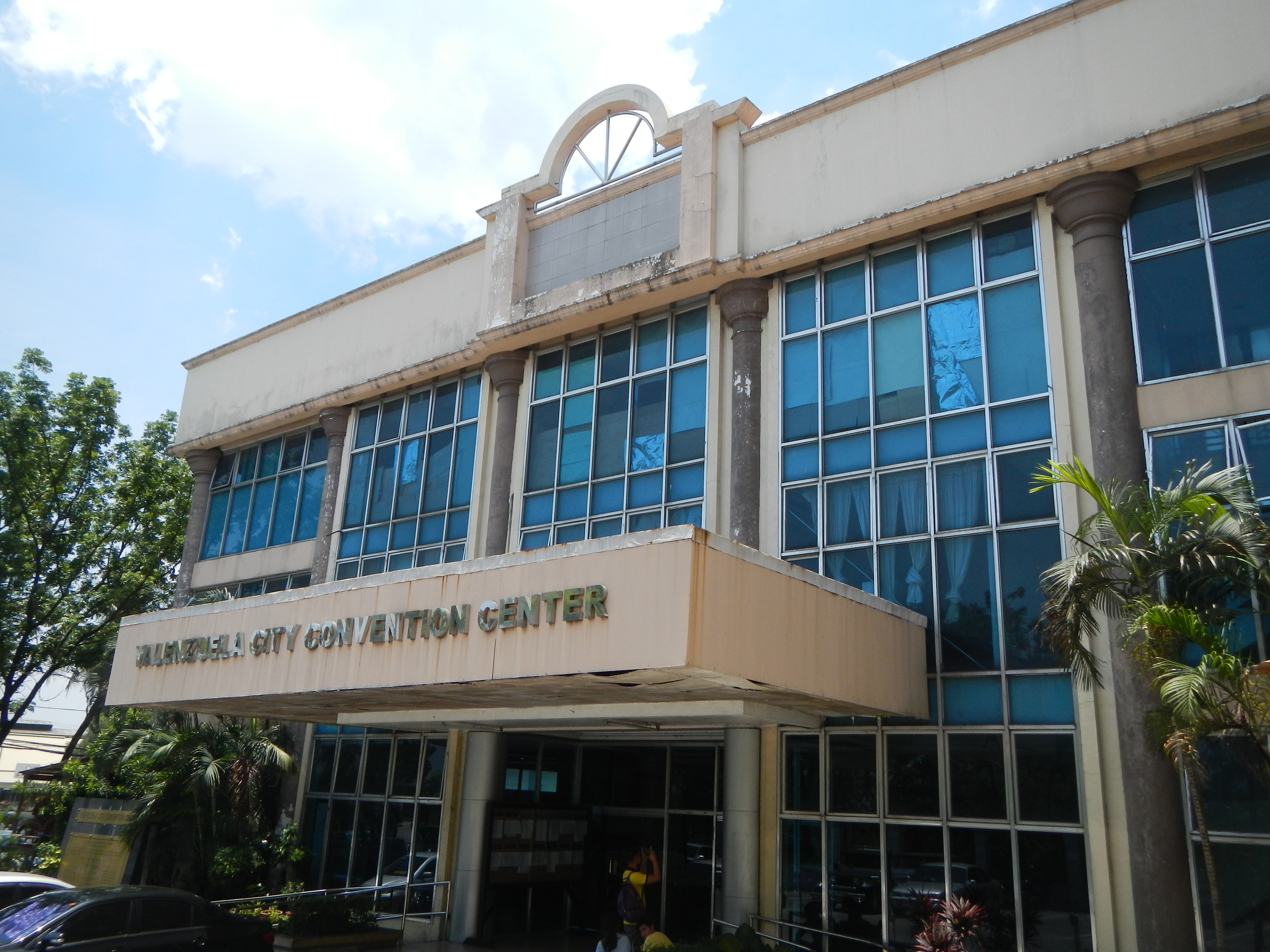
Facade

Valenzuela City Convention Center is a convention center located in Valenzuela in Metro Manila, Philippines. It is well known among the citizens of Valenzuela as its center for the performing arts, as well as a popular venue for concerts, art shows and exhibits, and conventions.

== See also ==
- Museo Valenzuela
