= Museo Valenzuela =

Museum in Valenzuela, Philippines

- The museum in 2021
- Established: November 6, 1998
- Location: Valenzuela, Metro Manila, Philippines
- Coordinates: 14°40′55″N 120°58′49″E

Museo Valenzuela is a museum in Valenzuela, Metro Manila, Philippines. It opened on November 6, 1998. It is the city's historical and cultural landmark, named after Pío Valenzuela in 1963. Museo Valenzuela features collections of artifacts depicting the city's past and continuing development. It is also a venue for historical, cultural, and artistic presentations as well as seminars and symposia on national and local issues.

== History ==
The original museum of Valenzuela was the house where Pío Valenzuela, a hero in the struggle of freedom against Spain and in whose memory the old town of Polo was renamed, was born and saw the best years of his life. The original house was burned down by the Japanese in 1945 and the first attempts at reconstruction frequently flooded.

The house was reconstructed starting in 2021; this construction was finished and the museum reopened to the public in 2023. The museum was accredited as a museum and gallery by the Department of Tourism in accordance with Republic Act 9593, also known as The Tourism Act of 2009, in January 2024.

== Gallery ==
These pictures predate the reconstruction.

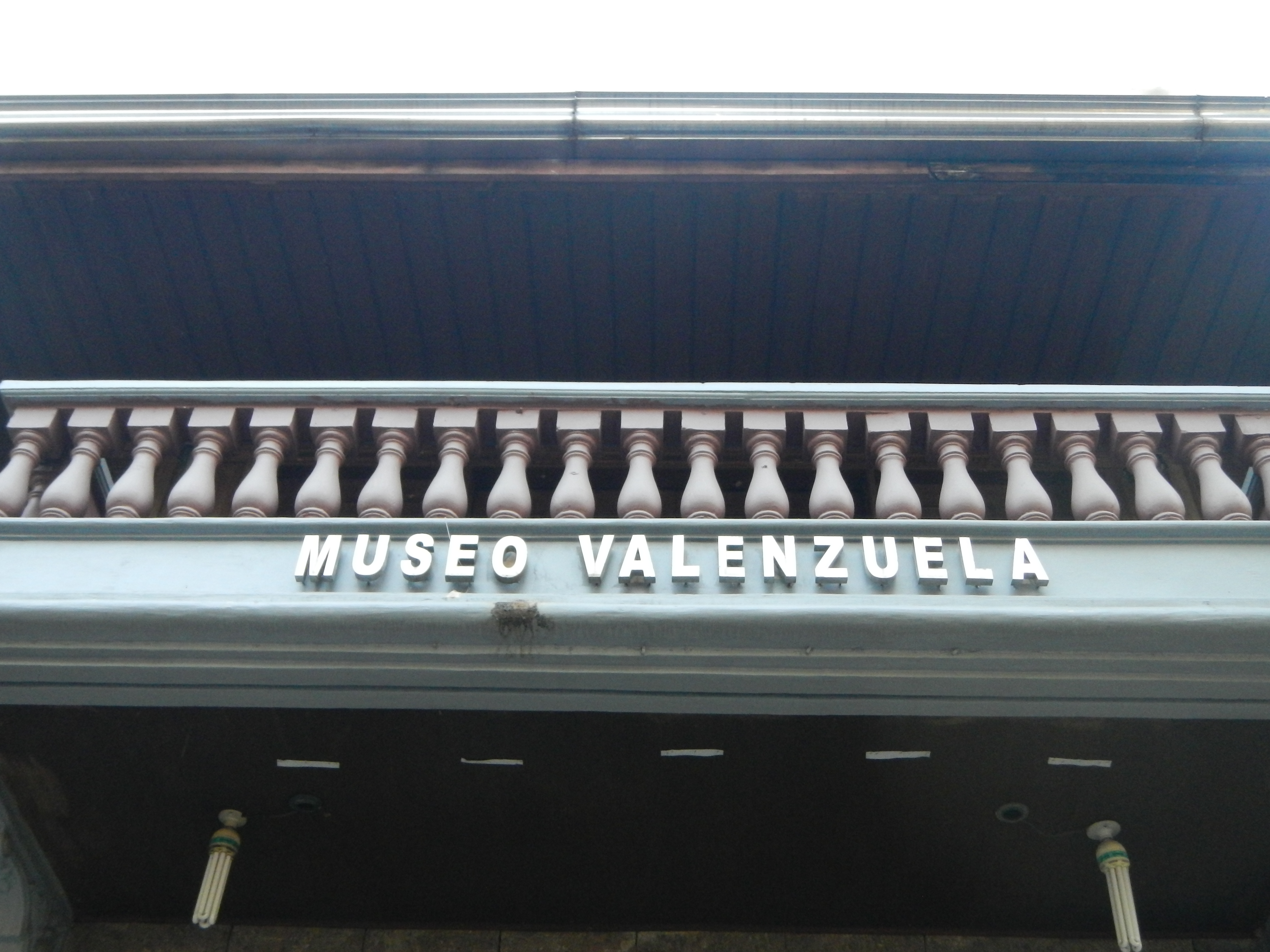
Frontage

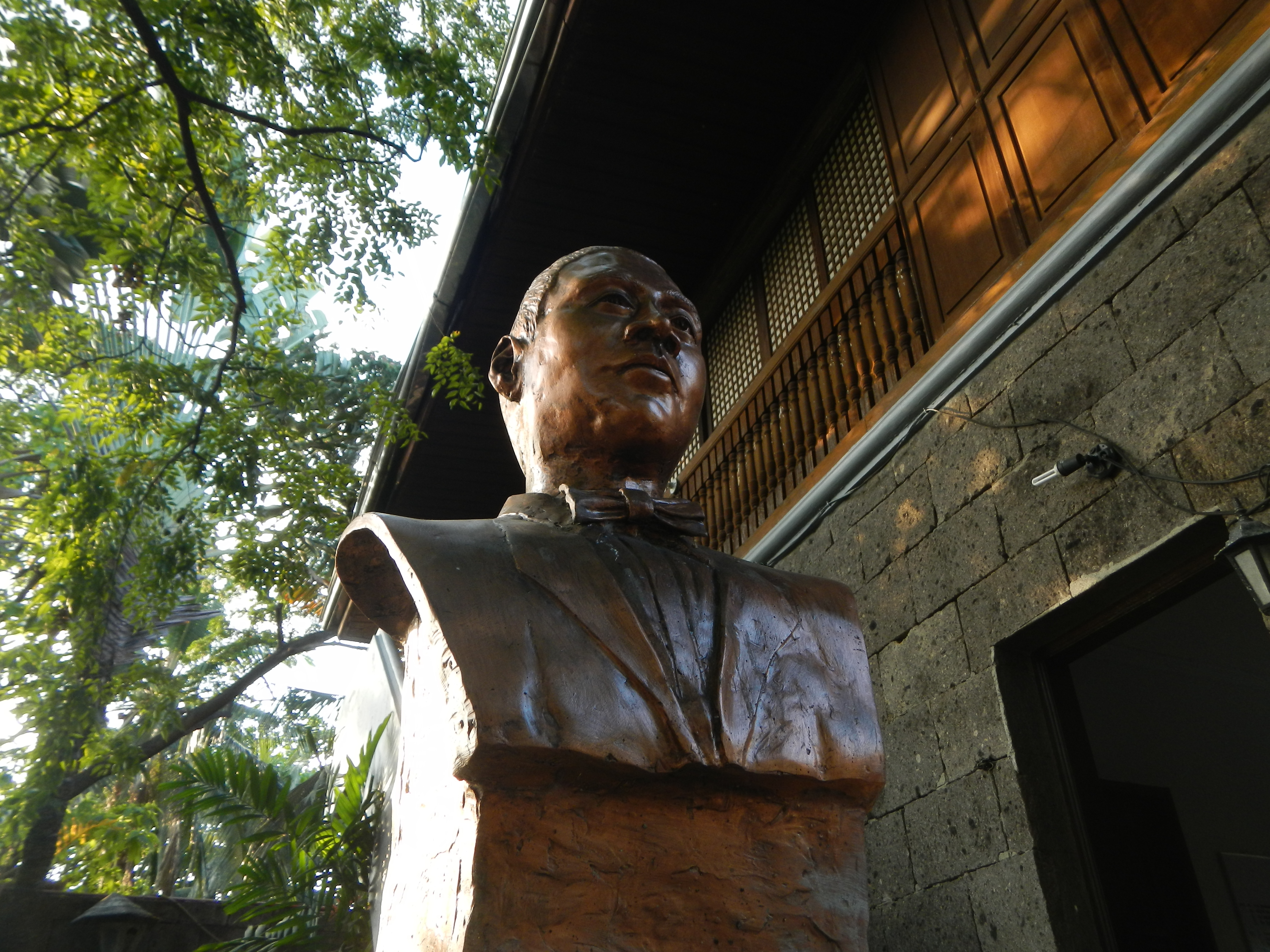
Pío Valenzuela

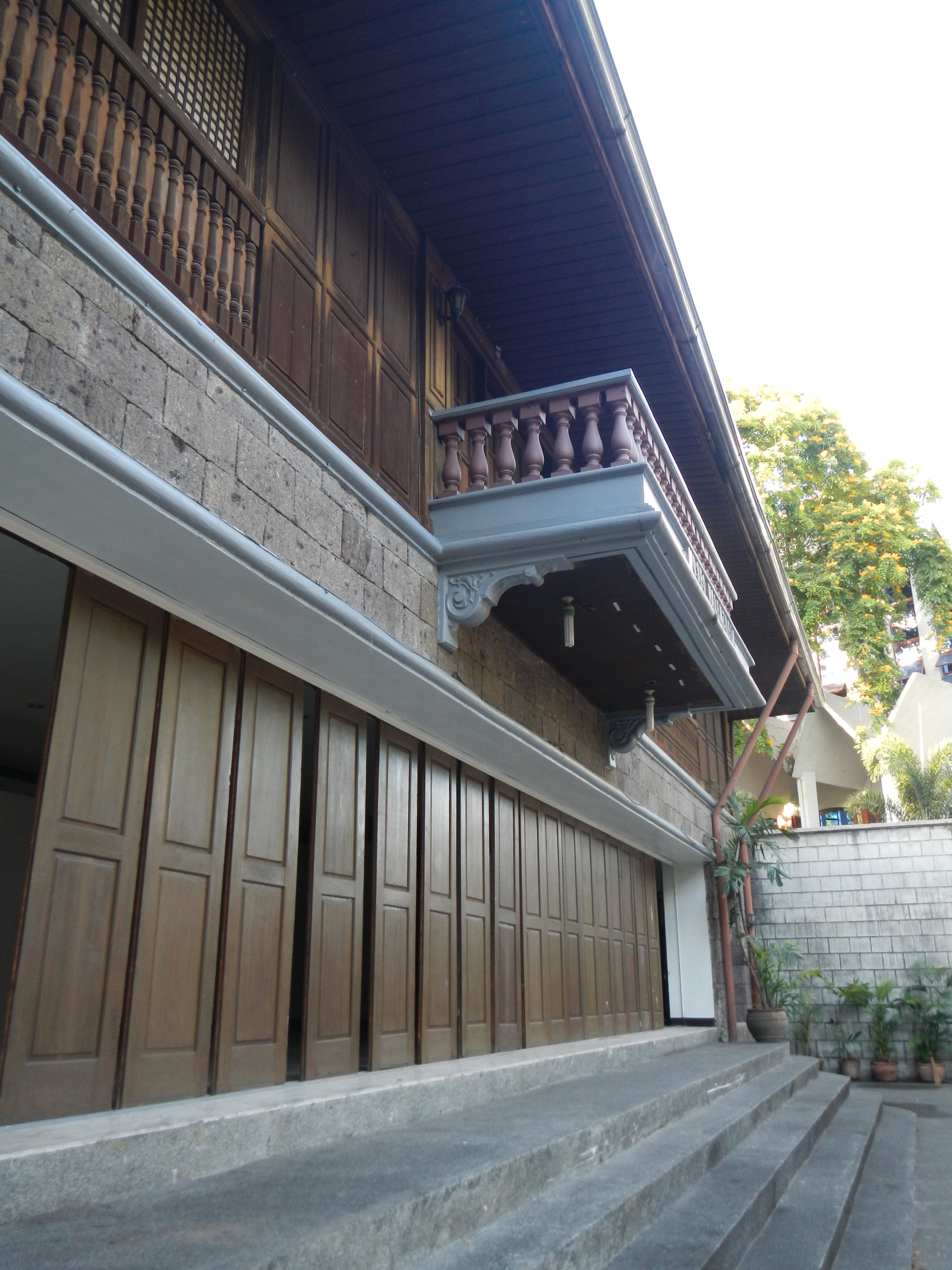
Side facade

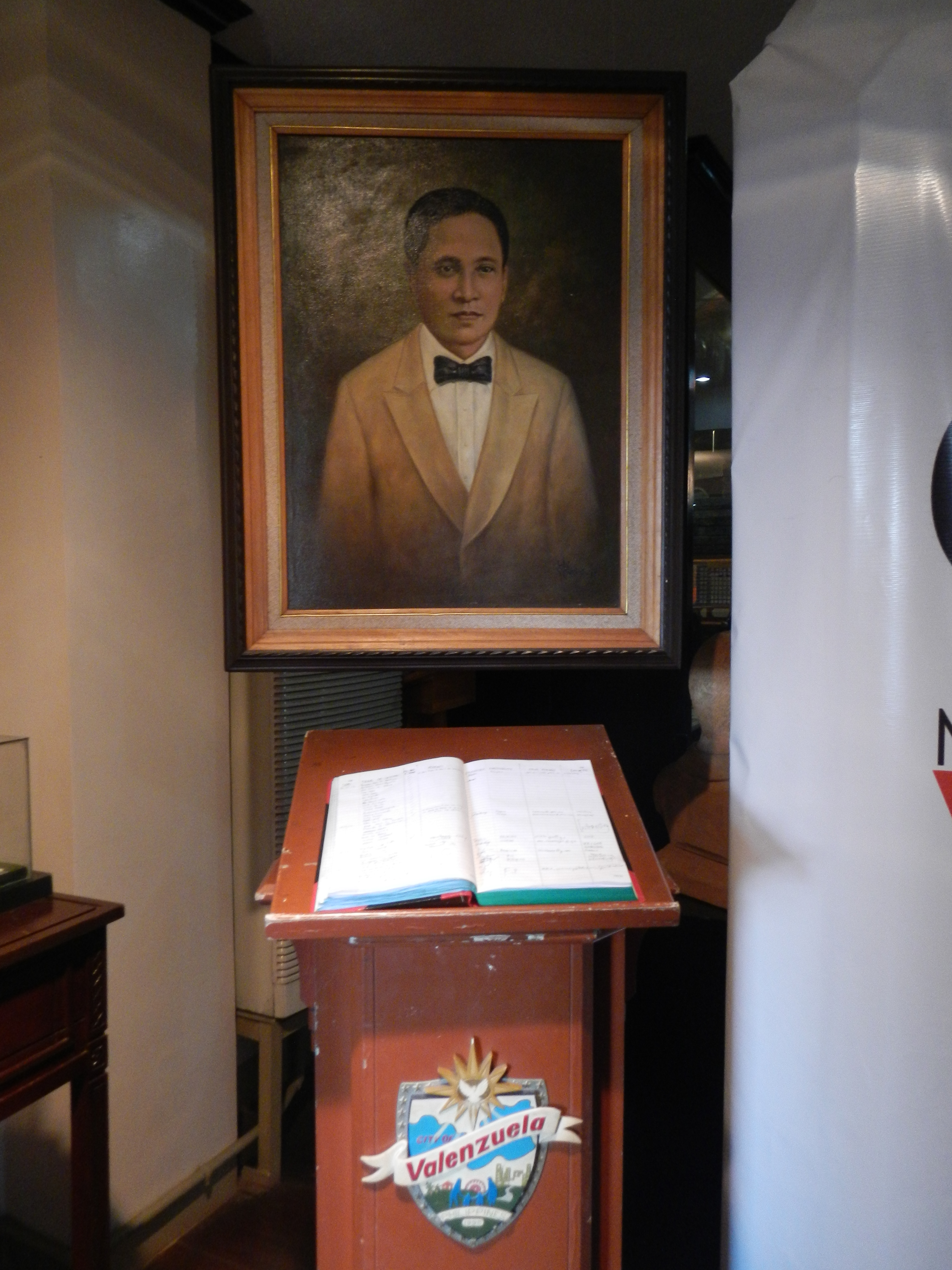
Entrance portrait

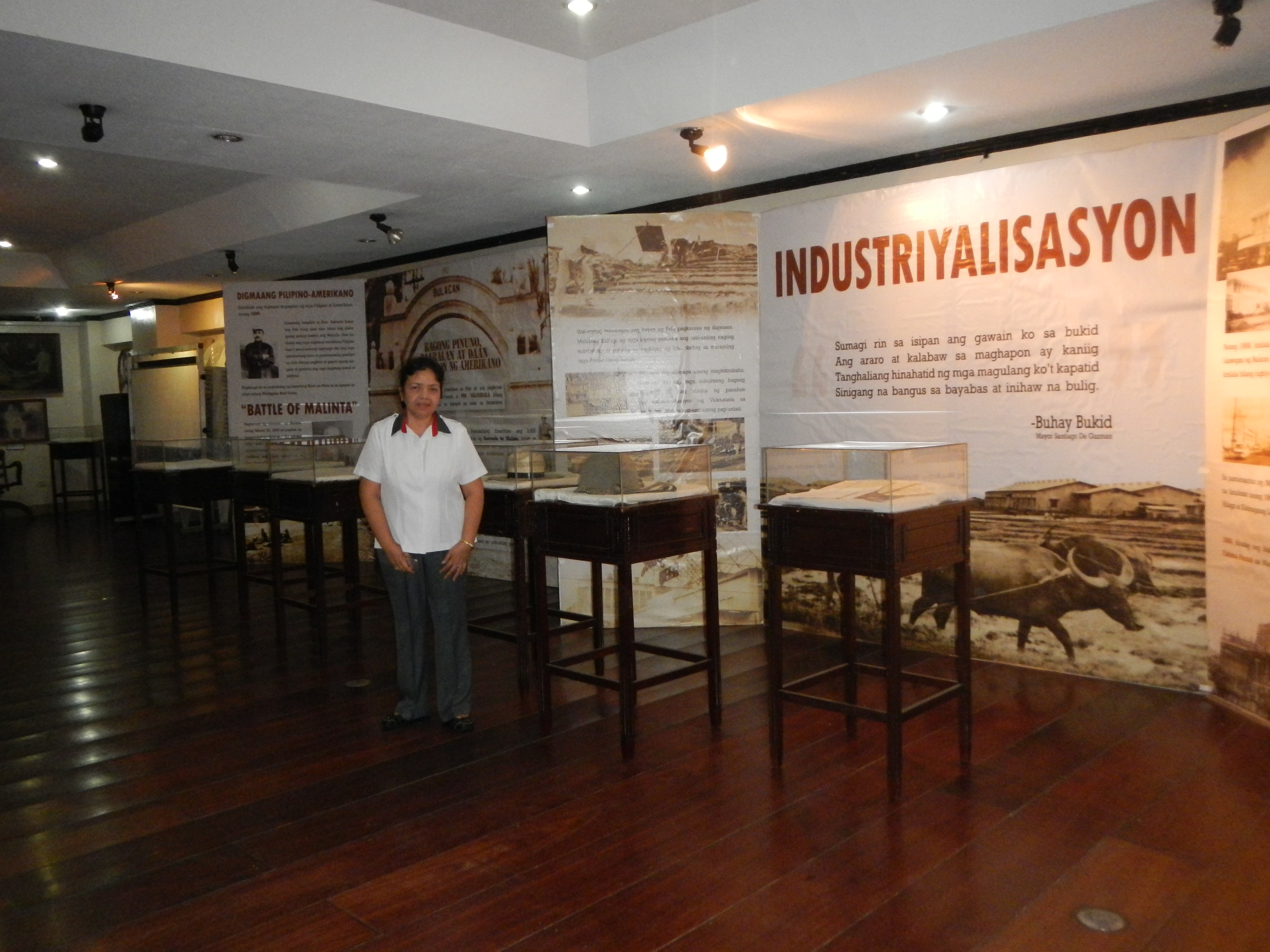
Interior, second floor

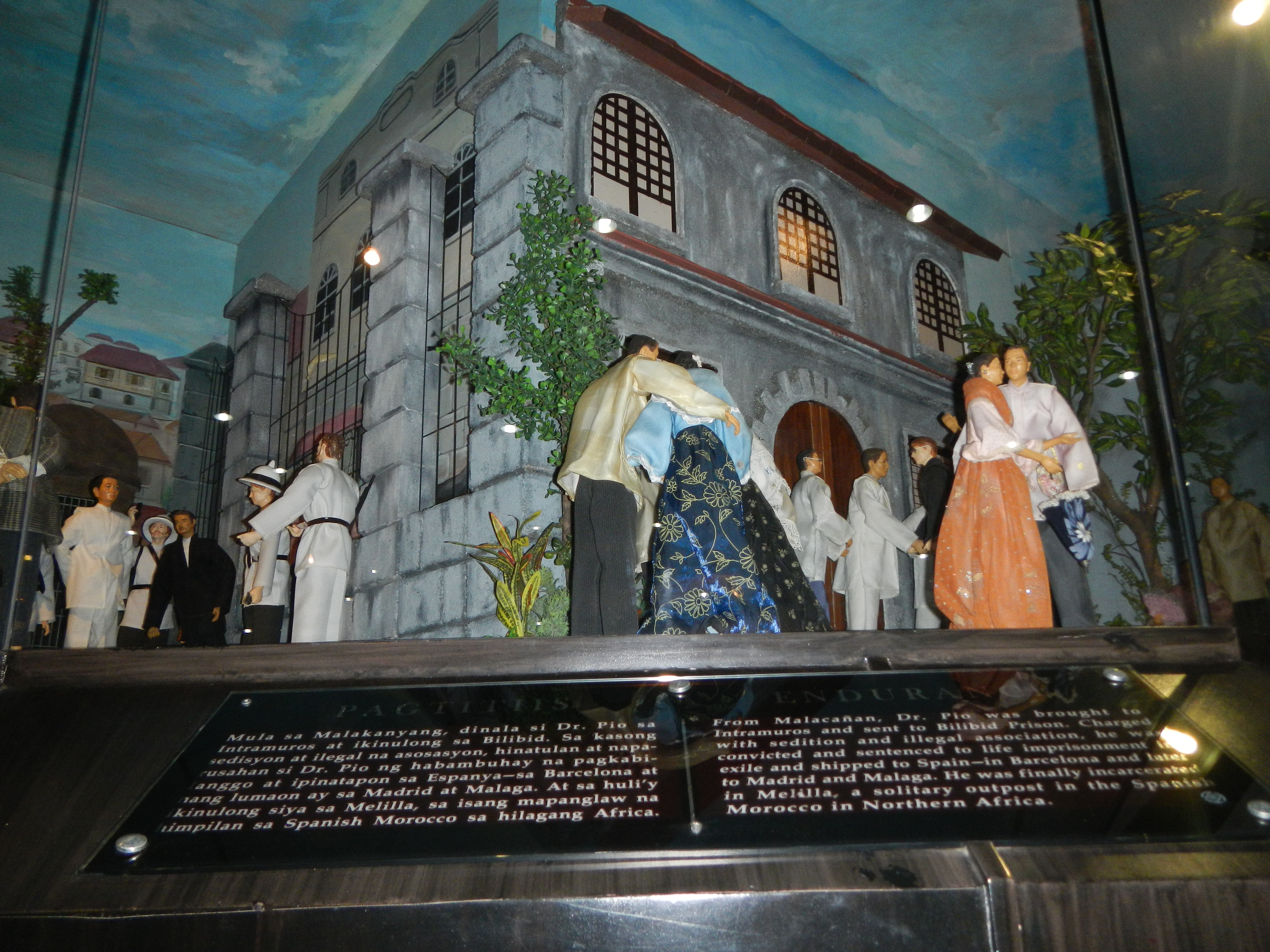
One of the dioramas

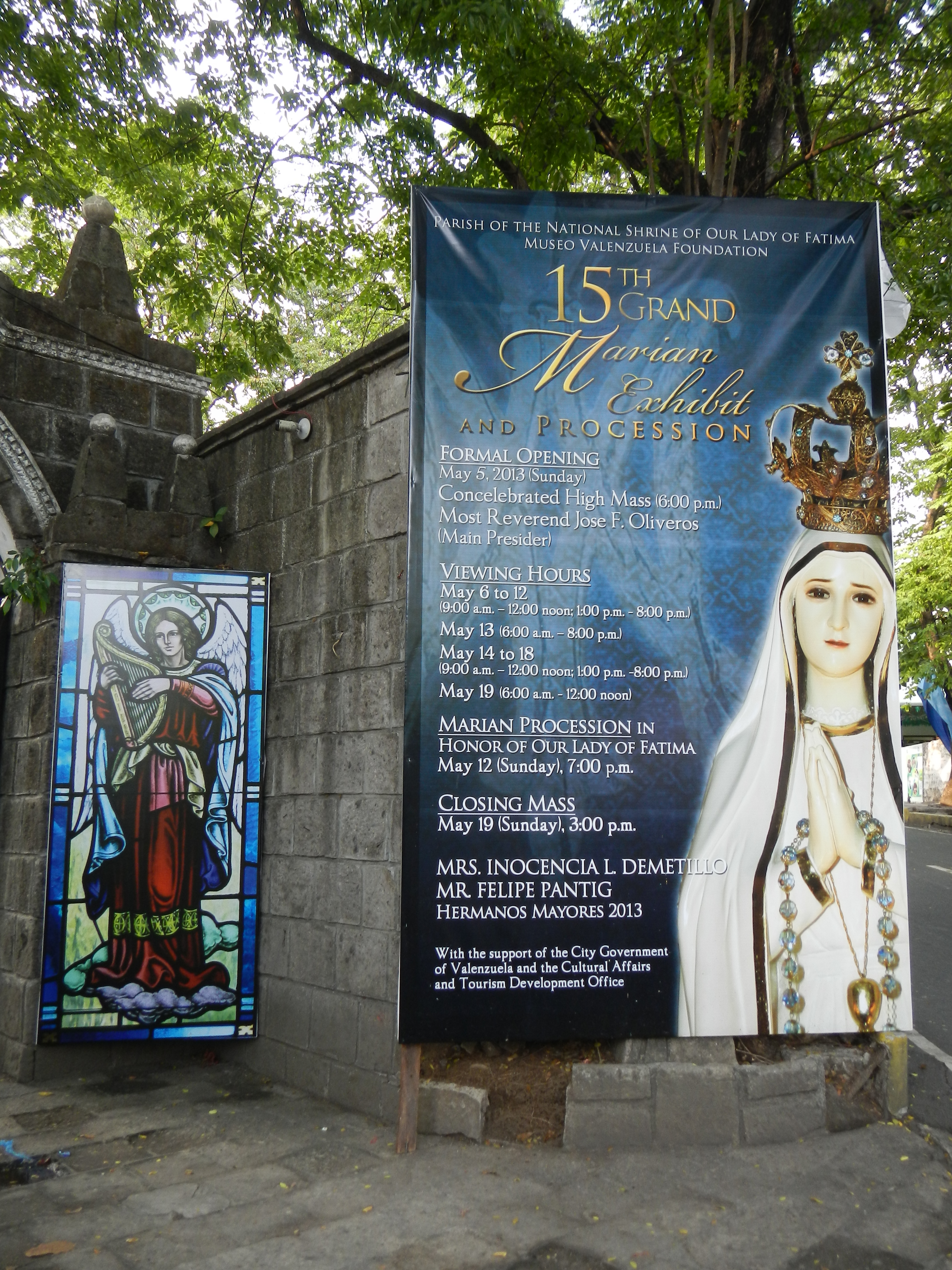
15th Grand Marian Exhibit, National Shrine of Our Lady of Fatima

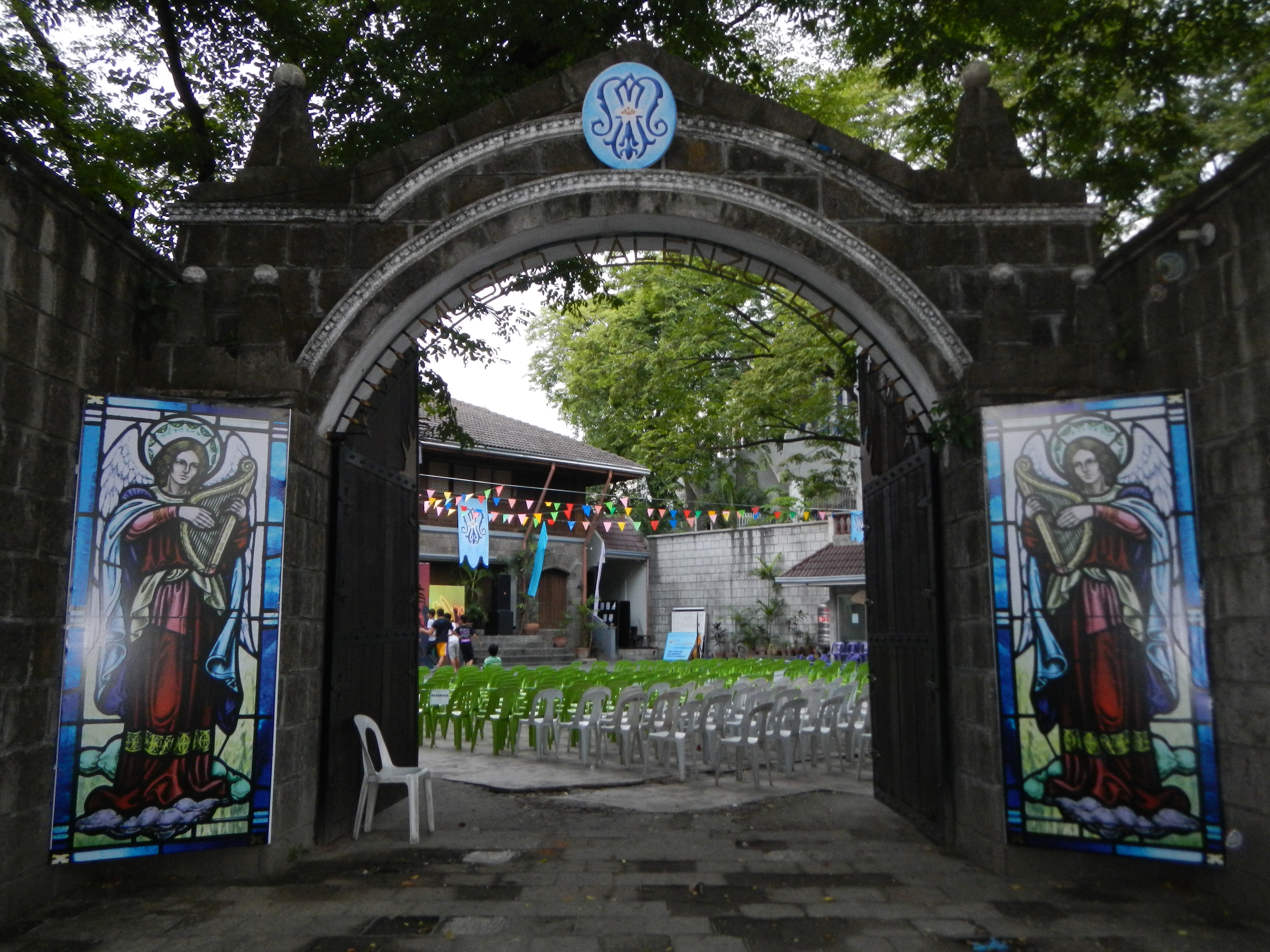
Entrance arch

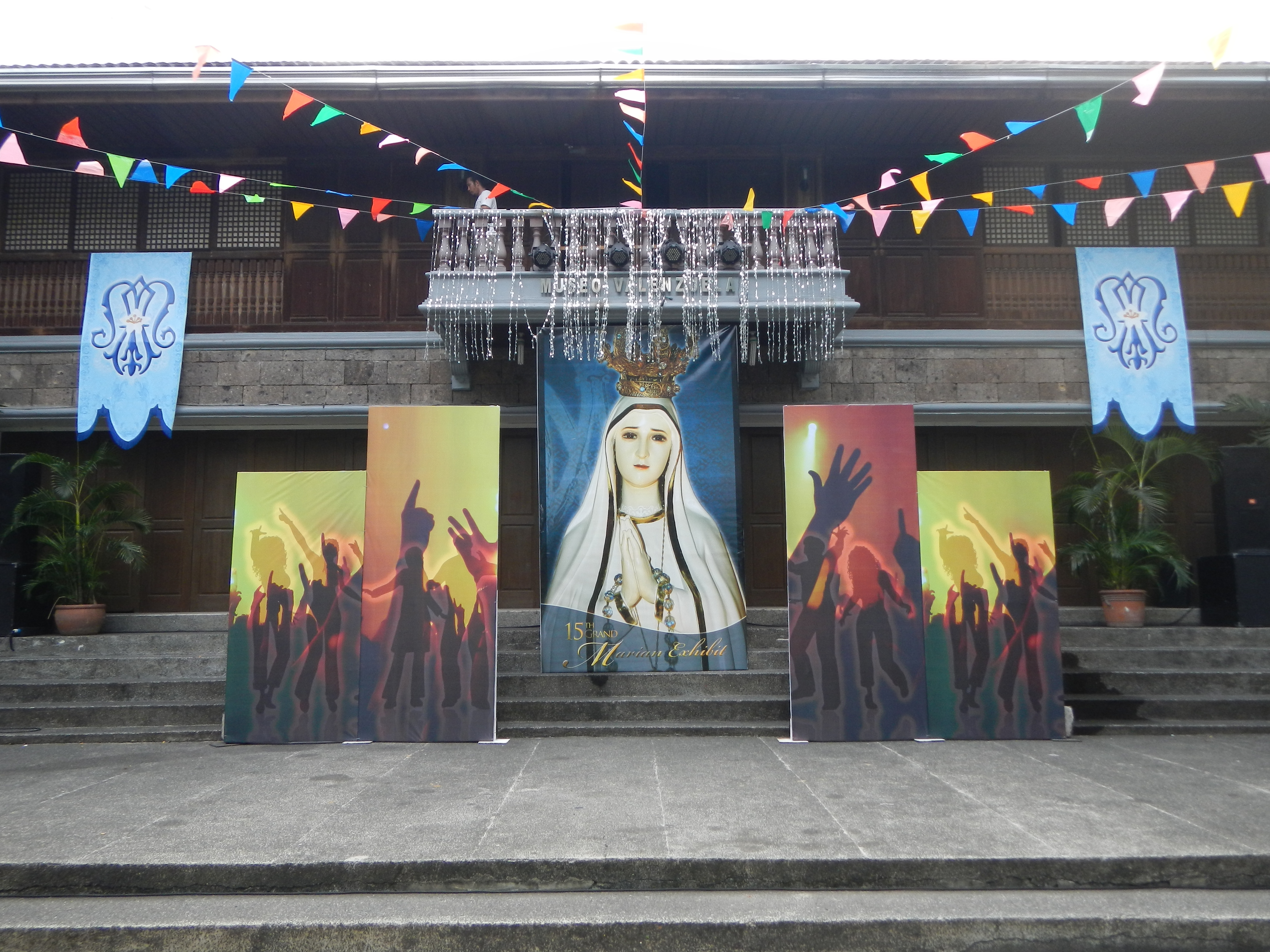
Front facade

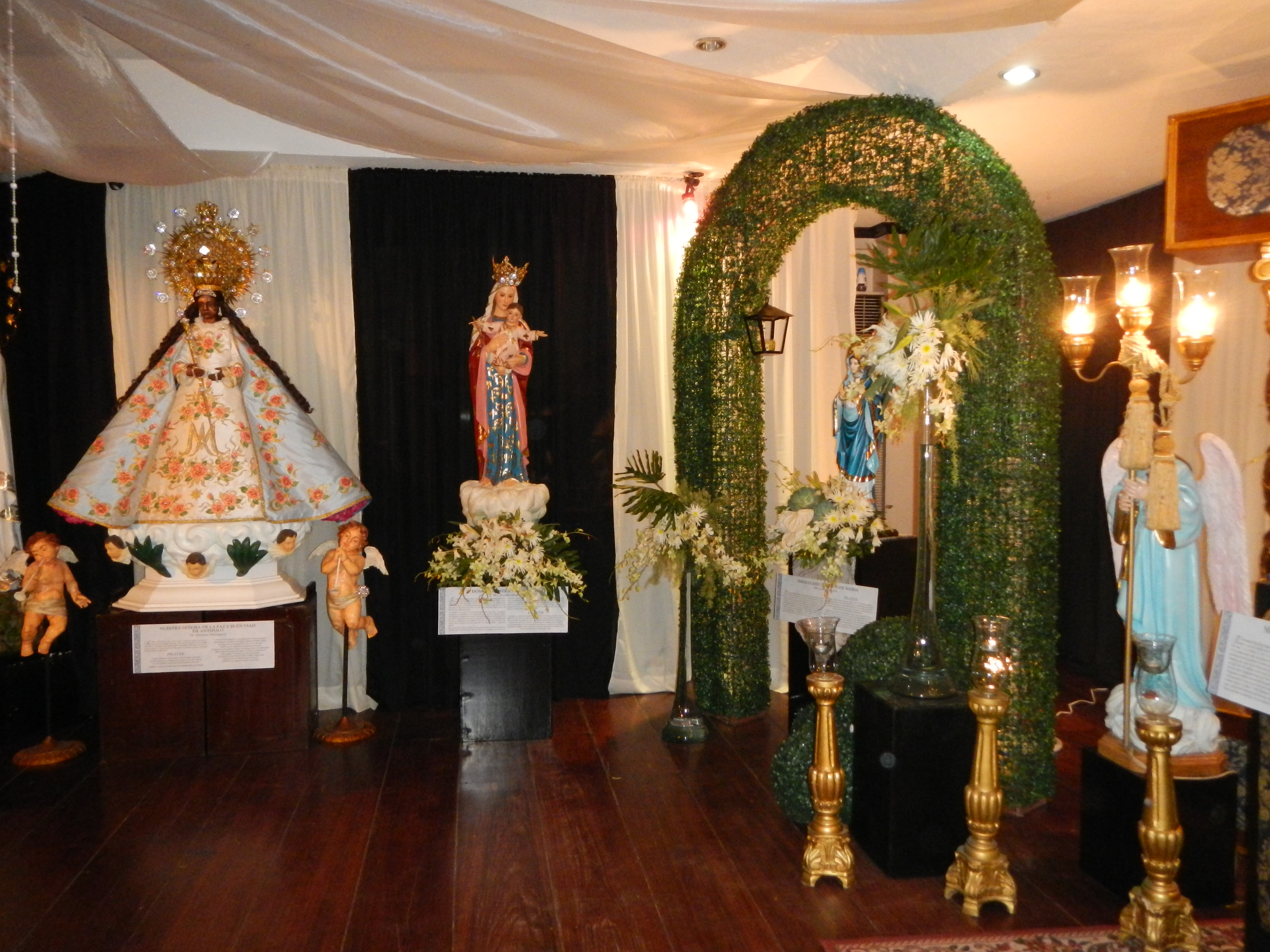
The Marian Statues of the Exhibit, 2013

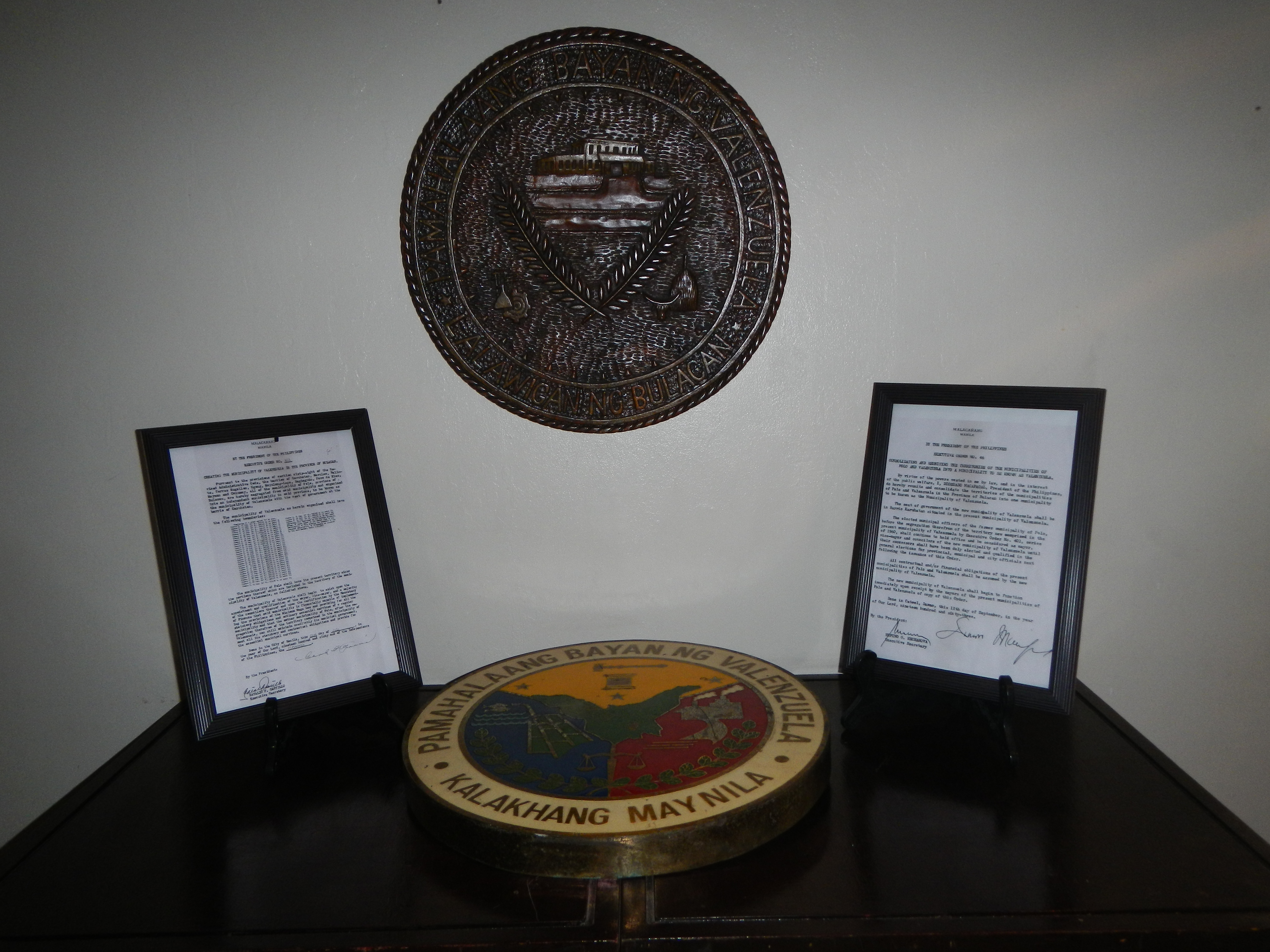
Valenzuela City creation documents

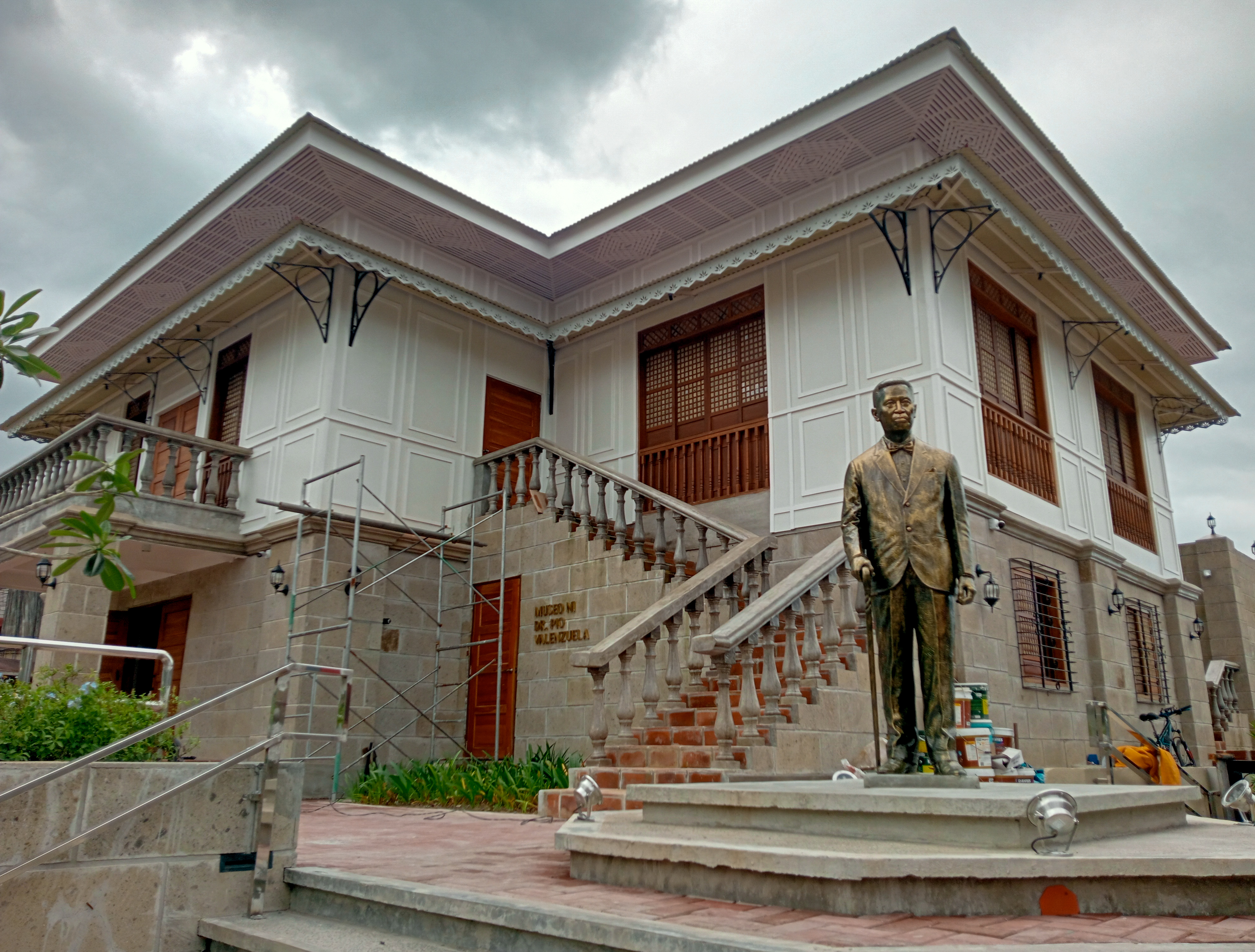
Museo ni Dr. Pio Valenzuela in Barangay Pariancillo Villa was inaugurated on February 14, 2023.

== See also ==
- Valenzuela, Philippines
- Pío Valenzuela
