= Pío Valenzuela =

Filipino physician and revolutionary (1869–1956)

The Honorable Pío Alejandrino Valenzuela
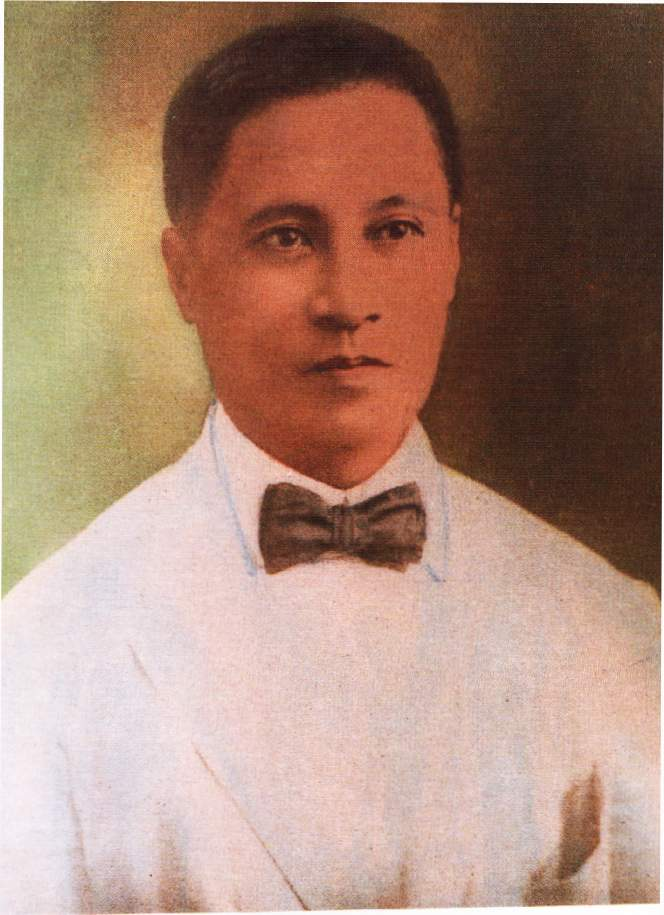

10th Governor of Bulacan
- In office 1921–1925
- Preceded by: Juan Carlos
- Succeeded by: Restituto Castro

Provincial Executive of Bulacan
- In office 1919–1922

President of Military Division of Polo Municipality
- In office 1902–1919

Municipal President of Polo
- In office September 6, 1899 – 1901
- Preceded by: Rufino Valenzuela; Cabeza de barangay (Spanish period)
- Succeeded by: Nemencio Santiago

Physician General of the Katipunan Supreme Council
- In office 1895–1898

Personal details
- Born: Pío Valenzuela y Alejandrino; 11 July 1869 Polo, Bulacan, Captaincy General of the Philippines, Spanish Empire
- Died: 6 April 1956 (aged 86) Polo, Bulacan, Philippines
- Party: Nacionalista
- Spouse: Marciana Castro
- Children: Mercedes Valenzuela-Los Baños; Amadeo Castro Valenzuela; Diego Castro Valenzuela; Rosa Valenzuela-Tecson; Abelardo Castro Valenzuela; Arturo Castro Valenzuela; Alicia Valenzuela-Lozada
- Profession: Physician

Pío Valenzuela y Alejandrino (July 11, 1869 – April 6, 1956) was a Filipino physician and revolutionary leader. At the age of 22, he joined the society of Katipunan, a movement which sought the independence of the Philippines from Spanish colonial rule and started the Philippine Revolution. Together with Andrés Bonifacio and Emilio Jacinto, they formed the secret chamber of the society called Camara Reina or Kamara Negra. He took charge of the publication of Ang Kalayaan, Katipunan's official publication. He was the one who tried to convince the exiled José Rizal to join the revolutionary movement.

When the Katipunan was discovered, he fled to Balintawak (now part of Quezon City) on August 20, 1896, but he later availed of an amnesty that the Spanish colonial government offered, and he surrendered on September 1, 1896. He was deported to Spain where he was tried and imprisoned in Madrid. He was later transferred to Málaga, and then to a Spanish outpost in Africa. He was incarcerated for about two years.

He returned to the Philippines in April 1899 and resumed his medical practice. He was immediately arrested by the Americans in fear of inciting insurrection. While still in prison, Valenzuela was elected the municipal president in his hometown Polo which forced the Americans to release him. From 1919 to 1925, he served as the governor of the province of Bulacan.

== Early years ==
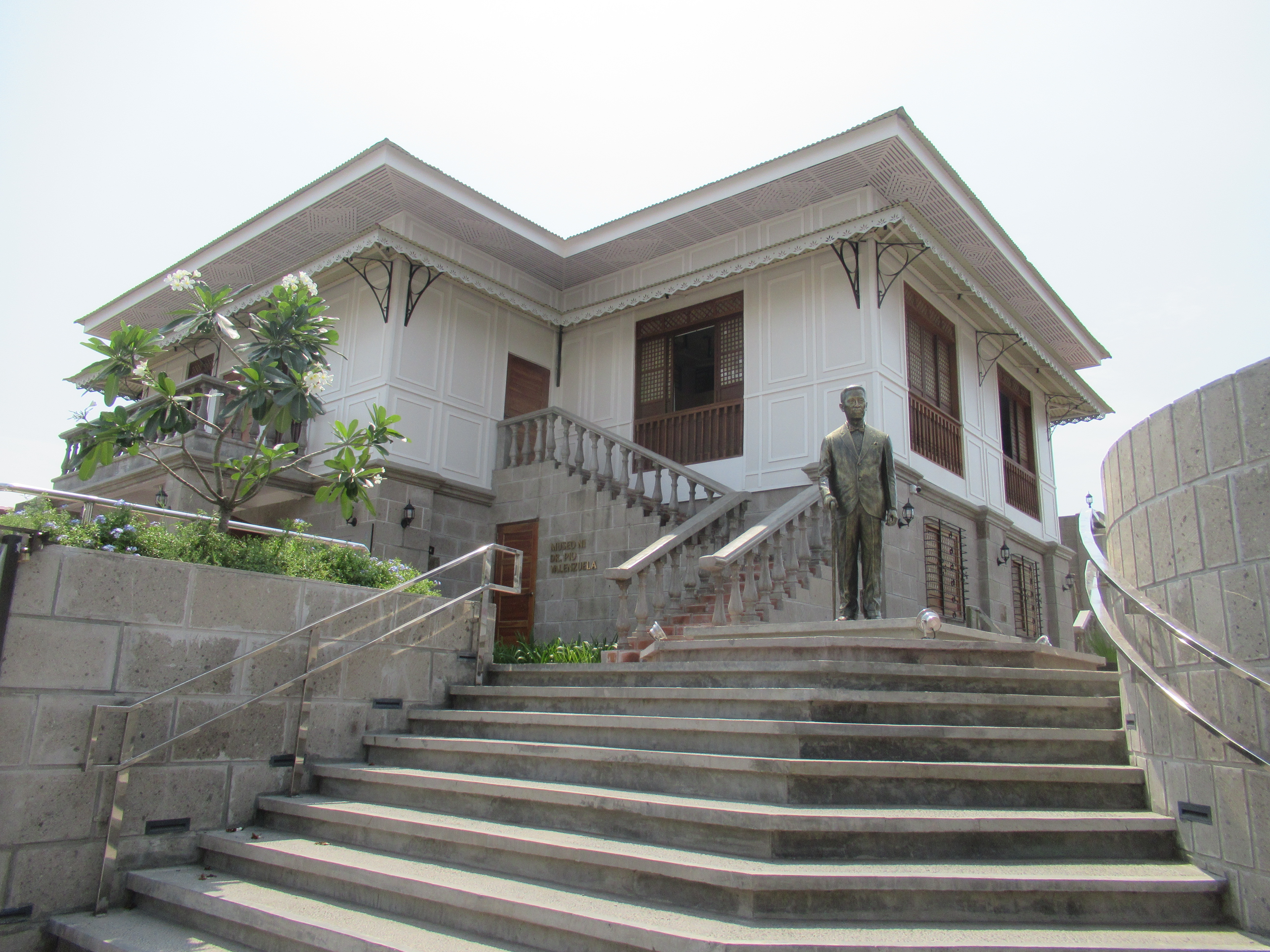
Dr. Pio Valenzuela Ancestral House, Valenzuela's birthplace has been converted into a museum called Museo ni Dr. Pio Valenzuela

Pío Valenzuela was born in Polo, Bulacan (present-day city of Valenzuela, Metro Manila), to Francisco Valenzuela and Lorenza Alejandrino, who both came from wealthy families. Pío was the third eldest sibling of the Valenzuela family: Agustina (born in 1861), Severo (born in 1865) and Tomás (born in 1871). His father came from a prominent family of gobernadorcillos of Polo.

After he was tutored at home, he was brought to Manila to study at Colegio de San Juan de Letran. In 1888, he enrolled at the University of Santo Tomas and finished his Licenciado en Medicina in 1895. He practiced his profession in Manila and Bulacan.

In July 1892, when he was a medical student and the Katipunan was barely a week old, he joined this secret organization. He became a close friend of its founder, Andrés Bonifacio, and was godfather to the first child of Bonifacio and Gregoria de Jesús. After their house burned down, Bonifacio and his family lived with Valenzuela.

== The revolutionary life ==
Valenzuela was elected fiscal of the secret society in December 1895. He was inducted together with the other elected officials at Bonifacio's home on New Year's Day in 1896. He used the nom de guerre "Dimas Ayaran" (untouchable) in the movement.

Shortly after his induction, Valenzuela moved to San Nicolas district in Manila so he could supervise the publication of the secret society's official organ, where he also wrote articles using the nom de plume "Madlang-Away" (bellicose). Valenzuela claimed in his memoirs that he was supposed to be the editor of the publication but Emilio Jacinto would eventually be the one to supervise its printing.

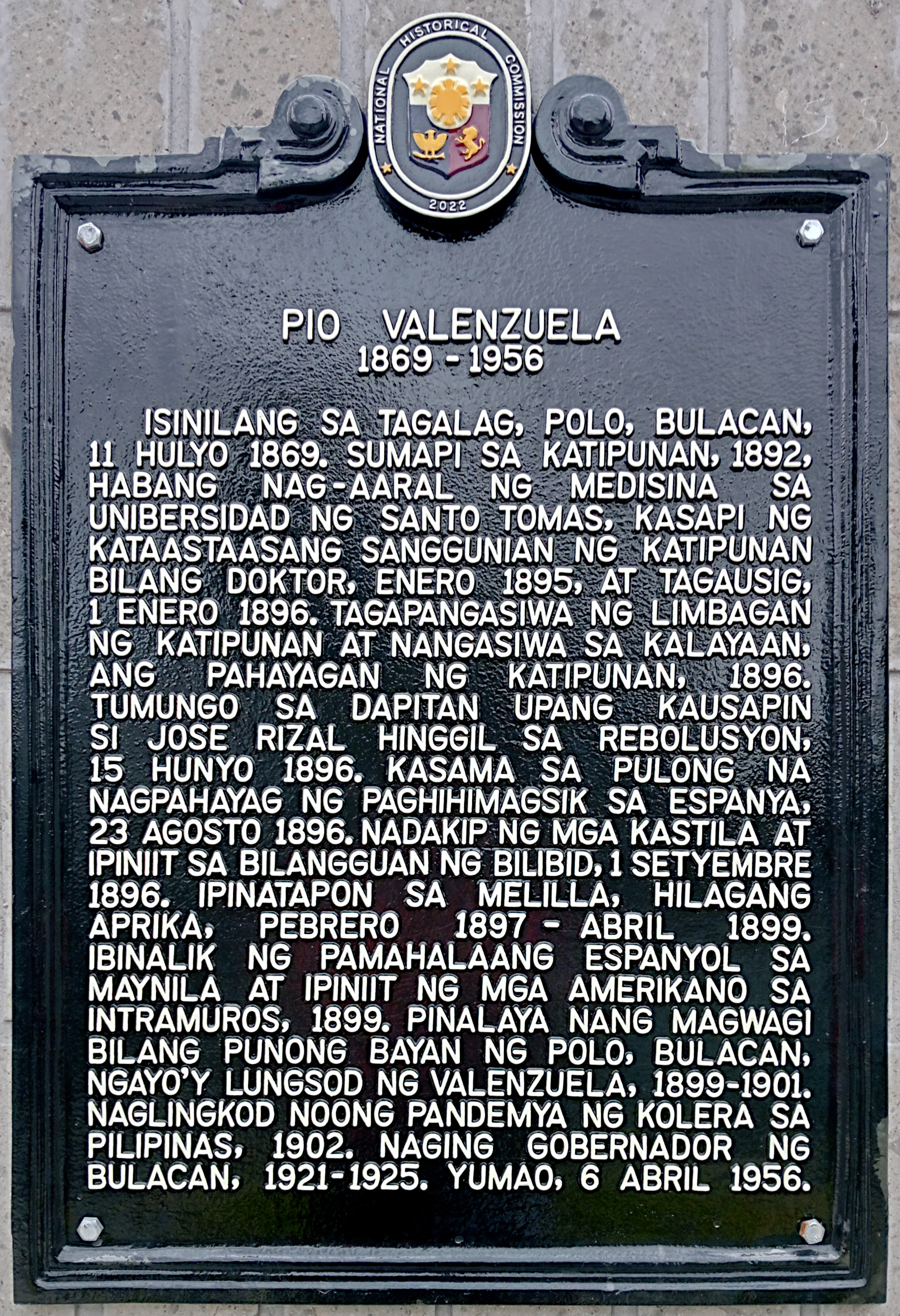
National historical marker installed in 2023 at the Dr. Pio Valenzuela Museum

Valenzuela said he was the one who suggested the name Kalayaan (Freedom) for the publication. To mislead the Spanish authorities, he also suggested that they place the name of Marcelo H. del Pilar as editor and Yokohama, Japan as the place of publication.

Kalayaan's first number, dated January 18, 1896, came out in March 1896 and consisted of a thousand copies, which were distributed to Katipunan members all over the country. However, the publication only came out with one more issue because the Katipunan had already been uncovered by the Spanish authorities. He considered the publication of Kalayaan as the most important accomplishment of the secret chamber of the Katipunan, which he claimed consisted of himself, Bonifacio and Jacinto, and he leaves.

In a meeting of the secret chamber in July 1896, they decided to assassinate the Spanish Augustinian friar who uncovered the Katipunan to the authorities, but they failed to accomplish the mission. Valenzuela also claimed that after the discovery of the Katipunan, he and Bonifacio distributed letters implicating wealthy Filipinos, who refused to extend financial assistance to the Katipunan.

He was a member of the committee that was tasked to smuggle arms for the Katipunan from Japan. He was also with Bonifacio, Jacinto and Procopio Bonifacio when they organized the Katipunan council in Cavite.

At the secret general meeting called by Bonifacio on the night of May 1, 1896, at Barrio Ugong in Pasig, Manila province, Valenzuela presented to the body a proposal to solicit contributions to buy arms and munitions from Japan. The proposal was approved on condition that it first be approved by José Rizal, who was in exile in Dapitan in Mindanao.

Pio Valenzuela's visit to José Rizal in Dapitan on June 15, 1896

Valenzuela was tasked to discuss the matter with Rizal, and he left for Dapitan on June 15, 1896. However, Rizal told him that the revolution should not be started until sufficient arms had been secured and the support of the wealthy Filipinos had been won over.

When the Katipunan was discovered, he fled to Balintawak on August 20, 1896, but he later availed of an amnesty that the Spanish colonial government offered, and he surrendered on September 1, 1896.

He was deported to Spain where he was tried and imprisoned in Madrid. He was later transferred to Málaga, Barcelona and then to a Spanish outpost in Africa. He was incarcerated for about two years.

== Under the Americans ==
He returned to the Philippines in April 1899. In Manila, he was denounced to the American Military authorities as a radical propagandist and once more imprisoned up to September of the same year.

To suppress aggressive leadership upon his release, he was made municipal president of Polo. From 1902 to 1919, he served as president of the military division of his district. In 1917, he became a District Health Officer. From 1919 to 1925, he served the people of Bulacan for two terms as provincial executive. As governor, he was uncompromising against graft and corruption in the government.

After he retired from politics, he wrote his memoirs on the revolutionary days. He also practiced his medical profession, but only for philanthropic purposes. He was married to Marciana Castro by whom he had seven children. Early in the morning of April 6, 1956, he died in his hometown, and was buried at the local cemetery.

== In popular culture ==
Valenzuela was portrayed in various films which featured or centered on the Revolution. He was portrayed by the following actors in these films:

- 1997 – Nonie Buencamino in Rizal sa Dapitan.
- 1998 – Marco Sison in the biopic Jose Rizal.
- 2012 – Sonny Alcantara in El Presidente.
- 2013 – Yuwin Cruz in the TV series, Katipunan.
- 2013 – Zieg Tercias in the Musical 1863

He was also portrayed by the following actors in the theater production Nom de Plume: Madlang Away of the Valenzuela City Center for the Performing Arts:

- 2006 – Arnold Reyesand Joel Molina, held at the Valenzuela City Convention Center
- 2013 – Marxs Escondo and Dariel Bagual, held at the Valenzuela City Convention Center.
- 2015 – Joel Molina and Dariel Bagual, held at the Valenzuela People's Park.

Directed by Andre Tiangco, Music by Arnel de Pano and Jose Jeffrey Camañag, with Roeder Camañag as the Artistic Director.

== Legacy ==
Valenzuela's old hometown of Polo was renamed to Valenzuela in 1960. Other places named after Pío Valenzuela, aside from places named after the city Valenzuela are:

- Pio Valenzuela Elementary School (Polo, Valenzuela)
- Pio Valenzuela Street (in University of the Philippines Diliman, Quezon City)
- Pio Valenzuela Street and Pio Valenzuela Street Extension (Marulas, Valenzuela)
- Dr. Pio Valenzuela Street (Pariancillo Villa, Valenzuela)
- Valenzuela Street (Santa Mesa, Manila).

The Dr. Pio Valenzuela Scholarship Program was enacted by the municipal government of Valenzuela in 1995 to grant educational assistance its deserving citizens.

== Images ==
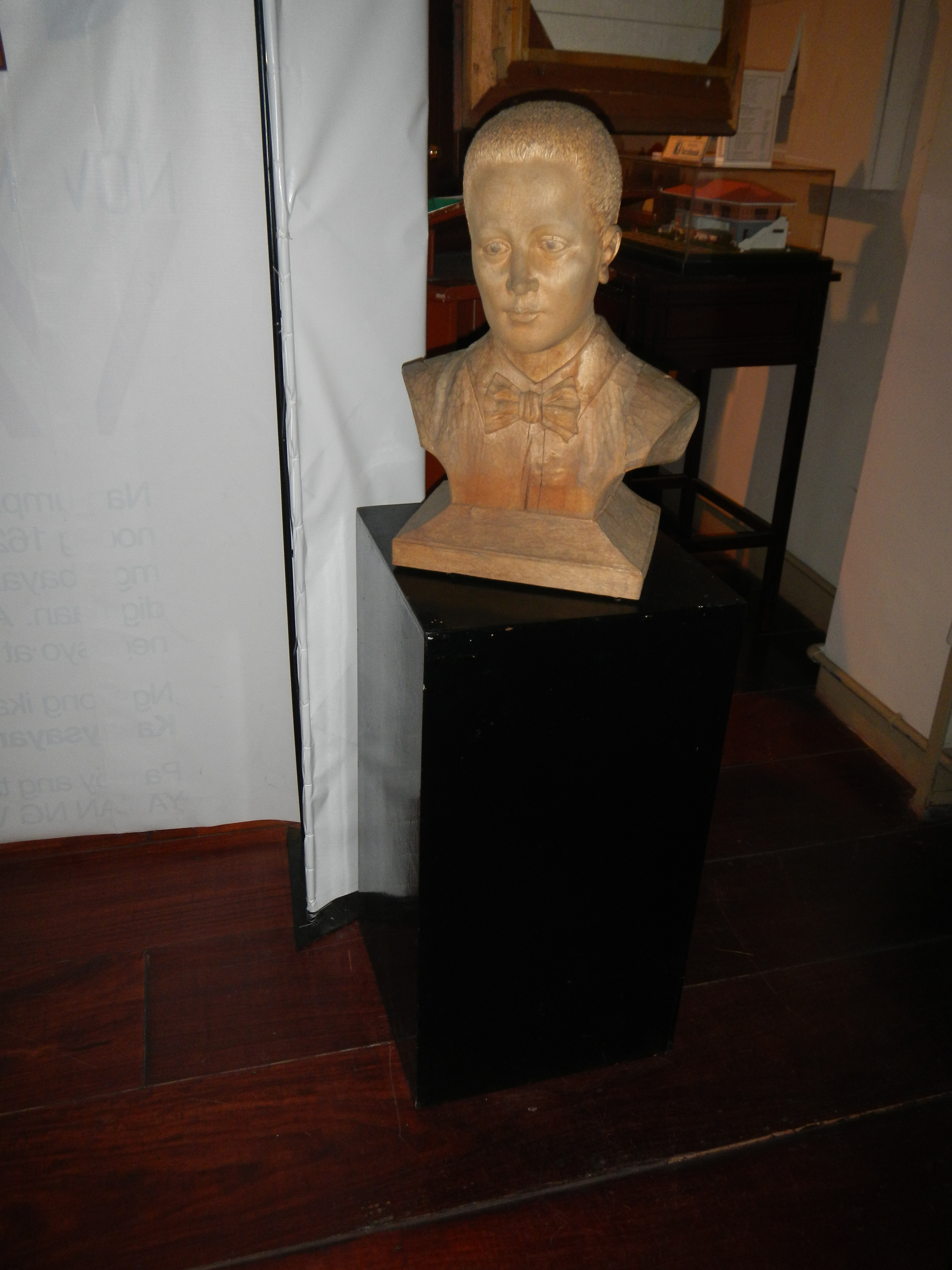
Bust in the Museo

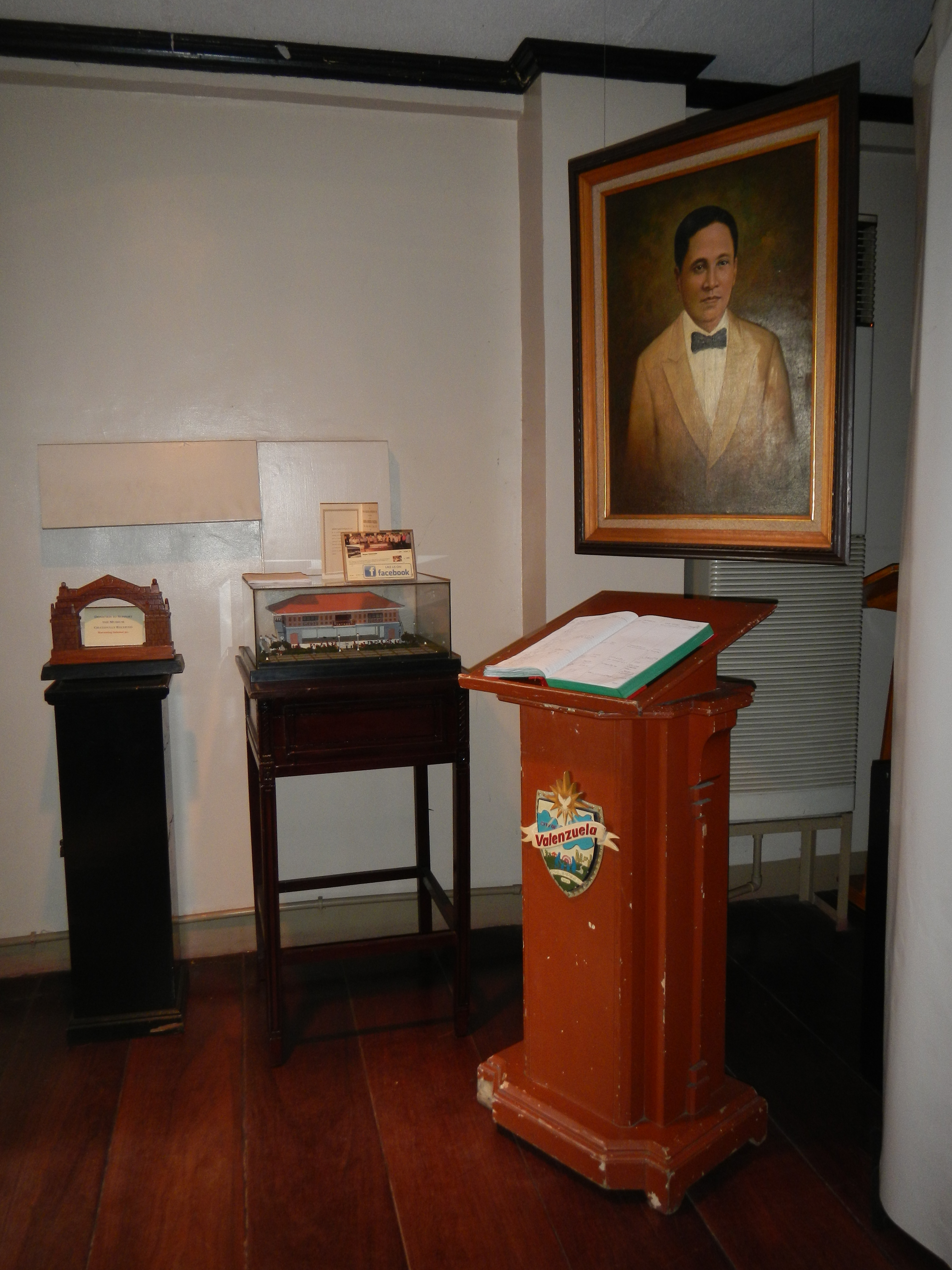
Legacy in Museo Valenzuela

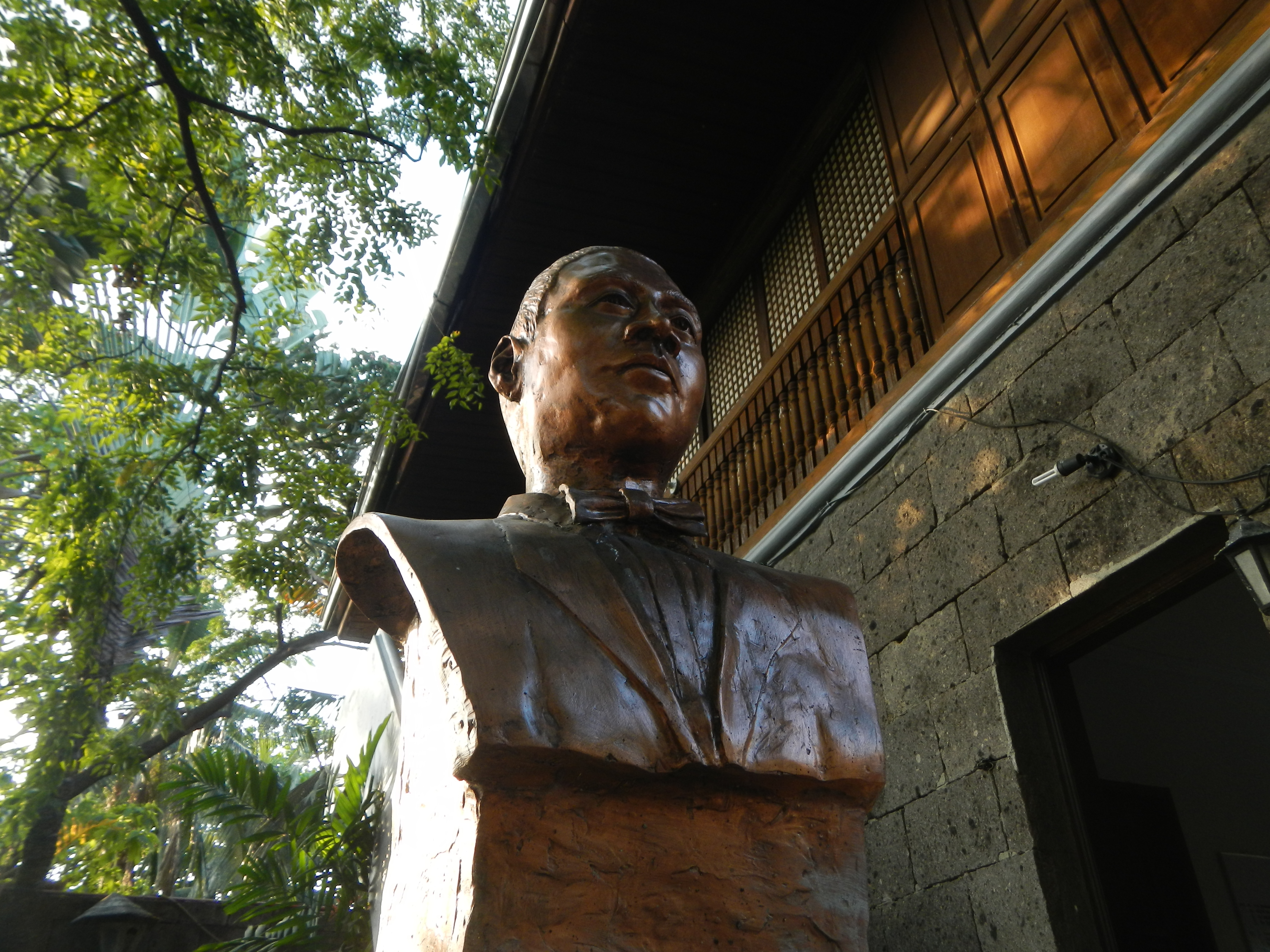
Another bust of Pío Valenzuela

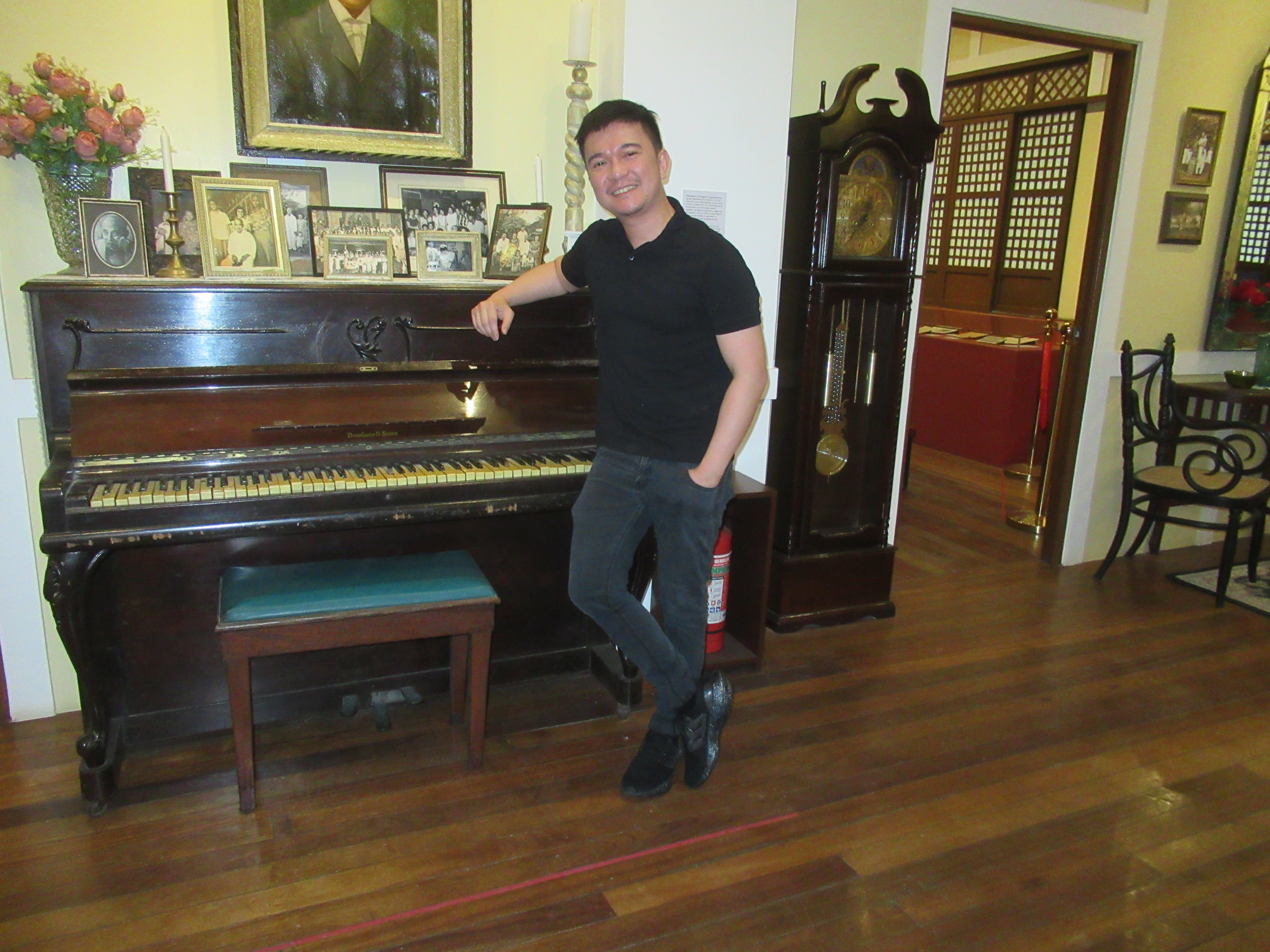
Jonathan Manalo - Interior of Museo ni Dr. Pio Valenzuela

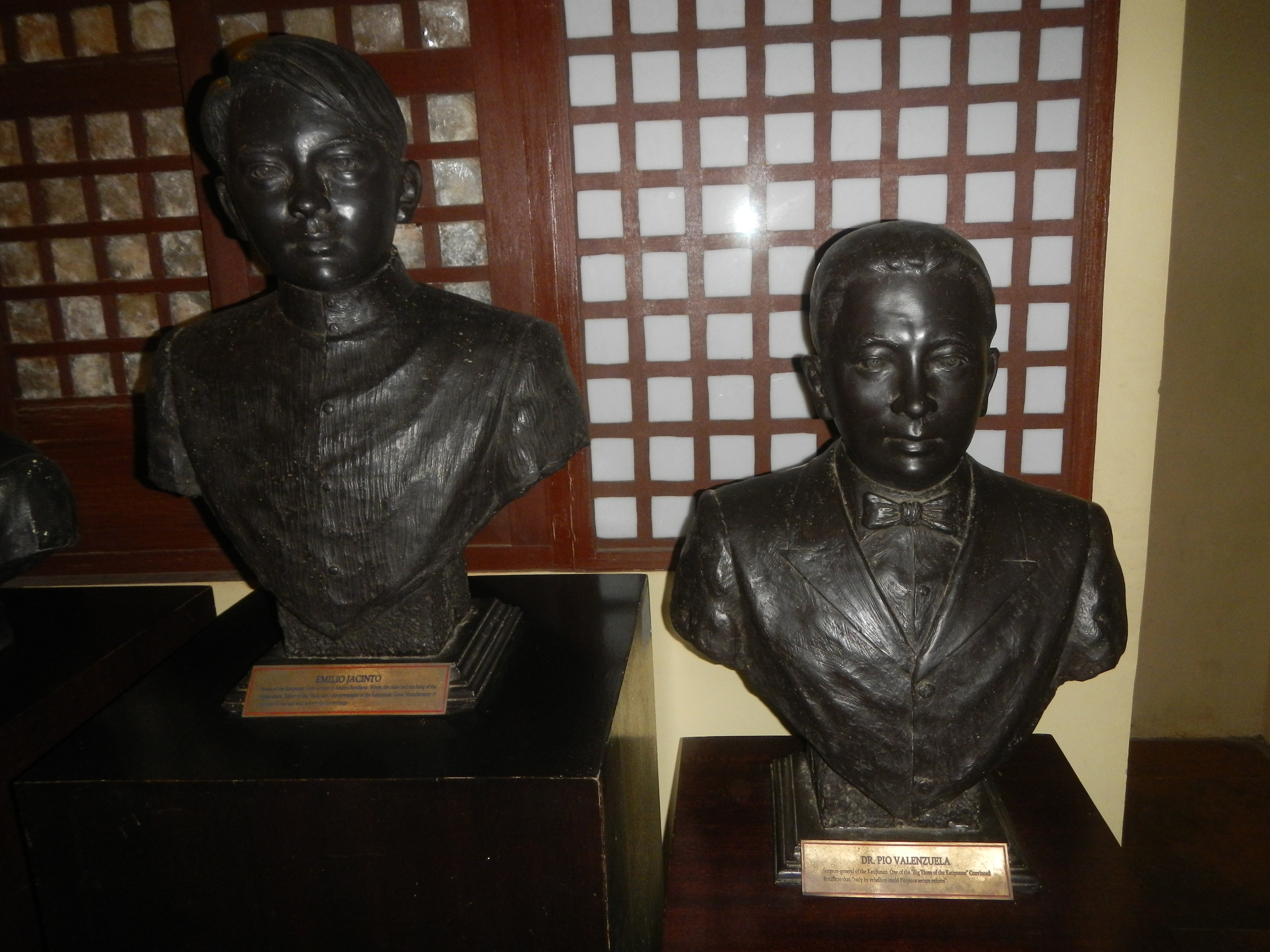
Bust at Museo ng Katipunan

Political offices
New office	Municipal President of Polo; 1899–1901	Succeeded by Nemencio D. Santiago
Preceded by Juan Carlos	Governor of Bulacan; 1921–1925	Succeeded by Restituto J. Castro
