= Gambling in Metro Manila =

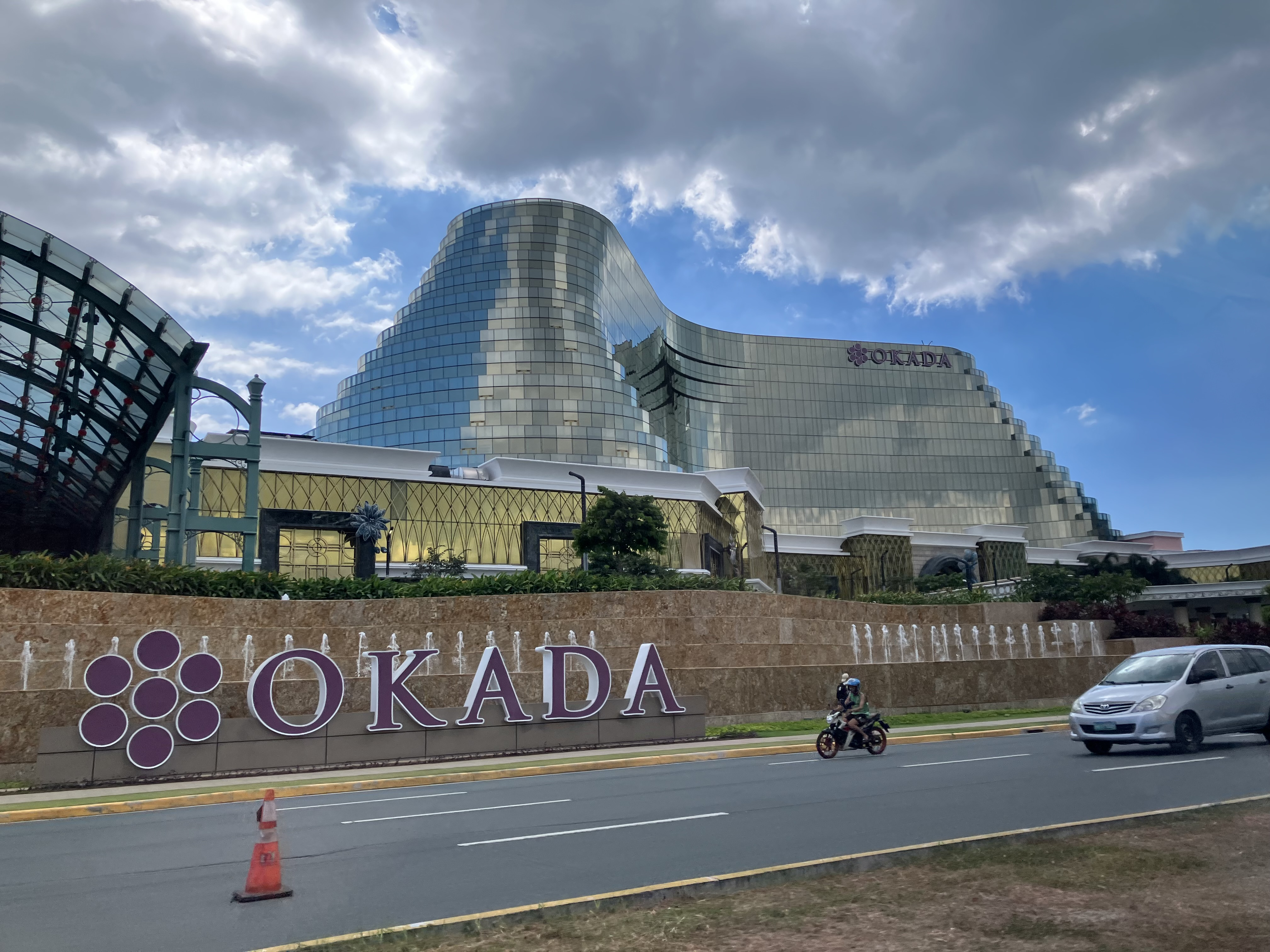
Okada Manila in Entertainment City, 2024

Gambling in Metro Manila has been regulated since 1976 when the Philippine Amusement and Gaming Corporation (PAGCOR) was created through Presidential Decree 1067. Under its charter promulgated in 1983, the 100% state-owned PAGCOR, running under the direct supervision of the Office of the President, serves three crucial roles: to regulate and operate all games of chance in the country, particularly casino gaming; generate funds for the government's infrastructure and socio-civic projects; and boost local tourism.

Prior to 1976, illegal gambling dominated the Philippines as unlicensed casinos and underground bookmaking operations were opened across the country. Illegal forms of gambling included jueteng, masiao and last two. Among the few lawful gambling activities in those days were church-organised bingo sessions and jai alai wagering at the Manila Jai Alai Building.

In 1977, PAGCOR opened its first casino, The Manila Bay Casino, a floating casino which operated in all three decks of luxury liner MS Philippine Tourist off Manila Bay in partnership with the Philippine Casino Operators Corporation (PCOC) and Manila Bay Enterprises, Inc. (MBEI) which was majority owned by the Sociedade de Turismo e Diversões de Macau of casino magnate, Stanley Ho. When a fire gutted the ship in 1979, PAGCOR shifted its operations to land-based casinos. By the end of that year, the Philippine Village Hotel built in 1974 at the old Nayong Pilipino complex adjacent to Ninoy Aquino International Airport (NAIA) became home to the city's first land-based casino.

== Casino gambling ==
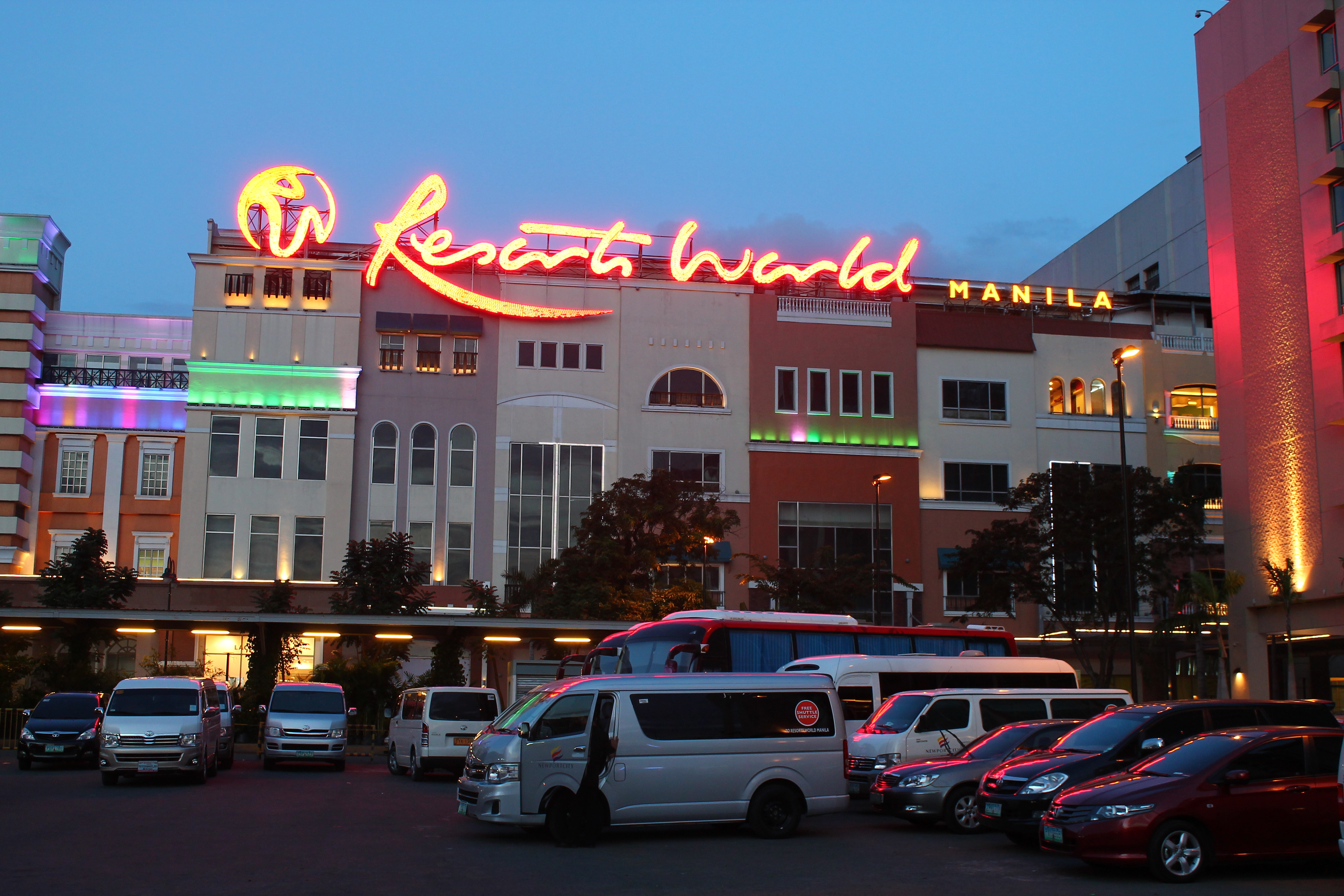
Resorts World Manila

Metro Manila currently has around twenty casinos, most of which are located near the Manila Bay area and Ninoy Aquino International Airport in Parañaque. Most casinos in the city are operated by PAGCOR under the Casino Filipino brand. Gambling in Manila now takes place primarily in luxury casino hotels and integrated resorts located in Entertainment City and Newport City under license from PAGCOR.

The Casino Filipino Pavilion at the Waterfront Manila Pavilion (formerly Holiday Inn Manila Pavilion) is Manila's oldest surviving casino which opened in 1986 until it was forced to suspend operations indefinitely after the building itself was severely damaged by a fire in 2018. The city's largest stand-alone casino was Casino Filipino Airport housed in the PRIC Building on Ninoy Aquino Avenue formerly occupied by Duty Free Philippines until 1997 but was closed down in July 2014. In 2009, Resorts World Manila, the Philippines' first integrated resort, was built on a portion of Villamor Air Base in Pasay across from NAIA Terminal 3. The city's newest casino is the $2.4-B Okada Manila completed in December 2016 in Entertainment City, the third of four billion-dollar casinos to rise in Manila's gaming strip.

Current casinos
Casino	District	City	Type	Comments
Casino Filipino Binondo	Binondo	City of Manila	Stand-alone	
Casino Filipino Citystate	Ermita	City of Manila	Stand-alone	
Casino Filipino Malabon		Malabon	Stand-alone	
Casino Filipino Santa Cruz	Santa Cruz	City of Manila	Stand-alone	
Casino Filipino Universal	Santa Cruz	City of Manila	Stand-alone	Casino Filipino VIP Club
City of Dreams Manila	Entertainment City	Parañaque	Resort	The second integrated resort to open in Entertainment City
Club Tropicana Las Piñas	Almanza	Las Piñas	Stand-alone	PAGCOR Club
Club Tropicana Santa Mesa	Santa Mesa	City of Manila	Stand-alone	PAGCOR Club
Empire Poker Sports Club	Ortigas Center	Pasig	Card room	
Lancaster Hotel	Ortigas Center	Mandaluyong	Hotel casino	Casino Filipino VIP Club
Madison Square Garden Hotel & Casino	Barangka Ilaya	Mandaluyong	Hotel casino	Casino Filipino VIP Club
Malabon Grand Hotel	Potrero	Malabon	Hotel casino	PAGCOR Club
Manila Grand Opera Hotel and Casino	Santa Cruz	City of Manila	Hotel casino	
Master Poker Sports Club	Bel-Air Village	Makati	Card room	
Metro Card Club	Ortigas Center	Pasig	Card room	
Midas Hotel & Casino	San Rafael	Pasay	Hotel casino	Formerly Hyatt Regency. PAGCOR Club
Midas Touch Poker Sports Club	Oranbo	Pasig	Card room	
Networld Hotel Spa & Casino	San Isidro	Pasay	Hotel casino	PAGCOR Club (Majestic)
New World Manila Bay Hotel & Casino	Malate	City of Manila	Hotel casino	Formerly Hyatt Regency Hotel & Casino Manila
Newport World Resorts	Newport City	Pasay	Resort	The first integrated resort in the Philippines. Originally known as Resorts World Manila.
Okada Manila	Entertainment City	Parañaque	Resort	The third integrated resort to open in Entertainment City
Sheraton Manila Bay	Malate	City of Manila	Hotel casino	Formerly Pan Pacific Manila. PAGCOR Club (Adriatico Square)
Sofitel Philippine Plaza Hotel	CCP Complex	Pasay	Hotel casino	Casino Filipino VIP Club
Solaire Resort & Casino	Entertainment City	Parañaque	Resort	The first integrated resort to open in Entertainment City
Winford Hotel and Casino	Santa Cruz	City of Manila	Hotel casino	An ₱8 billion hotel-casino complex developed by the Manila Jockey Club, Inc. in San Lazaro Tourism and Business Park.

Casinos under construction
Casino	District	City	Type	Comments
NayonLanding	Entertainment City	Parañaque	Resort	A US$1.5 billion integrated resort by Hong Kong-based Landing International Development that also includes a theme park originally slated for completion in 2022. Project is currently stalled due to five-year moratorium on new casinos in Entertainment City.
Solaire North	Triangle Park	Quezon City	Resort	Bloomberry Resorts and Hotels' second casino complex in Metro Manila at Vertis North, Quezon City Central Business District.
Westside City Resorts World (previously named Resorts World Bayshore)	Entertainment City	Parañaque	Resort	Genting Group's second integrated resort in Manila to open in 2021.
Waterfront Manila Hotel & Casino	Ermita	City of Manila	Hotel casino	Formerly Manila Hilton, Holiday Inn Manila Pavilion & Waterfront Manila Pavilion Hotel & Casino. Will retain the Casino Filipino Pavilion VIP Club. The reconstructed hotel casino is set to open under Phase 1 in late 2024, six years after a fire severely damaged it in 2018.

=== Closed casinos ===
- Casino Filipino Airport (closed 2014)
- Casino Filipino Heritage Hotel (closed 2013)
- Grand Boulevard Hotel & Casino
- Silahis International Hotel (closed 2008)
- Philippine Village Hotel Casino (closed 2001)
- Manila Bay Casino (closed 1979)

== Sports gambling ==
Sports betting has a long history in the Philippines. Popular forms of legalized sports gambling include betting on cockfighting, jai alai and horseracing. Sabong, as how cockfighting is known locally, has been hugely popular even prior to Spanish colonization in 1521. It was legalized and regulated in the early 18th century as a source of revenue for the Spanish colonial government. In 1854, the Tondo cockpit in Manila generated as much as 80,000 Mexican silver dollars for the government. By 1861, a new series of regulations were passed which permitted it to be held on Sundays and holidays, including town fiestas. The sport remains popular today and is regulated by the Philippine Gamefowl Commission created in 1981 under the Games and Amusement Board.

The Games and Amusement Board also regulates jai alai and horseracing operations as well as off-track bookmaking stations in the country. Jai alai was first introduced in the Philippines in 1899 with some of the earlier games played in the Casino Español de Manila. In 1939, the games shifted to the Manila Jai Alai Building. Jai alai was temporarily banned in 1986 because of problems with game fixing. The building was subsequently torn down in 2000. By March 2010, however, jai alai returned to the country with the games now being played in a fronton in Santa Ana, Cagayan.

Betting on other competitive sports such as boxing, basketball, football and tennis is also possible through licensed sportsbook MegaSportsWorld that has several branches in Metro Manila and a telephone service.

== Online gambling ==
PAGCOR operates 102 e-Games stations throughout Metro Manila. An e-Games station is an internet café that allows customers to play casino games online. In addition, there are 12 e-Games sites in the metropolis operated by BigGame, Inc. (BGI), a subsidiary of PhilWeb Corporation, under license from PAGCOR. As of August 10, 2016, the e-Games outlets operated by PhilWeb were closed following the non-renewal of its license by PAGCOR.

== See also ==
- Tourism in Manila
- Gambling in the Philippines
- List of casinos in the Philippines
- List of hotels in Manila
