= Carlos Magdaluyo =

Filipino businessman (1921–1995)

Carlos Villanueva Magdaluyo
- Born: May 20, 1921; Pasay, Philippines
- Died: 1995 (aged 74)
- Occupation: Businessman
- Known for: Leading the efforts to revitalize and nationalize casinos in the Philippine gambling industry

Carlos Villanueva Magdaluyo (May 20, 1921 – 1995) was a Filipino businessman. He was influential in the movement to revitalize and nationalize casinos in the Philippine gambling industry.

== Early life and education ==
Born on May 20, 1921, in Pasay, Philippines, Carlos Magdaluyo was the fourth of eleven children of Marcos Magdaluyo and Baldomera Villanueva. His ancestry traces back to the Aklanon people of Aklan, as does his surname Magdaluyo, which comes from Kalibo, Aklan.

He graduated with a bachelor's degree in business administration at the Institute of Accounts, Business and Finance, now known as Far Eastern University.

== Business career ==
Magdaluyo entered the gambling industry working as a cashier in one of the ten privately owned casinos in Manila. He worked his way up and slowly assumed other administrative and gaming responsibilities, until he eventually became one of the pillars of the Philippine Amusement and Gaming Corporation (PAGCOR) during his time.

After Martial Law was declared by President Ferdinand Marcos on September 21, 1972, Magdaluyo decided to live a simple life with his family, away from the limelight. He refused to dabble in the political side of gambling due to the intrigue that loomed over public servants during the era, which was a result of the mounting pressure from the international community against alleged humanitarian and civil rights violations being committed by the regime.

After the Philippine People Power Revolution of 1986, Magdaluyo assumed the position of Vice President for Operations of the revived PAGCOR and became the heart and soul of the movement for nationalizing the gambling industry in the country. Up until then, the casino industry was an exclusively private and largely unregulated industry in the Philippines. Magdaluyo, together with his son Raymundo Magdaluyo, had for so many decades been moving for the increased regulation of casinos in the Philippines, hoping to bring with it a revitalization and expansion of the industry through private enterprise. The movement eventually gained traction upon Magdaluyo's appointment at PAGCOR and soon, the casino industry in the country boomed. Following the success of their advocacy, Magdaluyo teamed up with Nevada-native and Philippine casino entrepreneur Murray Hertz. Their group eventually introduced the world of casino operations to Korea, opening the first casino in the country in Incheon in the 1960s.

== Death ==
Magdaluyo celebrated his 74th birthday on May 20, 1995, in the province of Batangas. He died of diabetes later that year.

== Legacy ==
In 2011, Magdaluyo's grandson, Raymund Magdaluyo, together with his cousins, opened Filipino restaurant Patio Carlito as a tribute to their late grandfather.

As of 2019, the casino industry in the Philippines was expected to reach $4.1 billion in total revenues. There are also now more casinos in the Philippines than there are in Macau, with more than 20 casinos in Metro Manila alone. These industry milestones see their roots in the efforts of Magdaluyo throughout his career to push for the expansion of the Philippine casino industry.

== Descendants ==
- Eric Fructuoso, Filipino actor and former hip hop dancer
- Raymund Magdaluyo, restaurateur

== See also ==
- Philippine Amusement and Gaming Corporation (PAGCOR)
- Gambling in the Philippines
- Gambling in Metro Manila
