= Gambling in the Philippines =

Gambling has been present in the Philippines since at least the sixteenth century. Various legal and illegal forms of gambling are found almost all over the archipelago. The government manages gambling through the Philippine Amusement and Gaming Corporation (PAGCOR) a state-owned enterprise which both operates a number of individual casinos and in turn acts as a regulator to privately owned casino operators. Since 2016 PAGCOR has also granted operating licenses and overseen the regulation of growing online gambling sector serving offshore markets. Casino gambling and integrated resorts have become a key component of the Philippines appeal as a tourist destination with more than twenty casinos found in Metro Manila alone.

== History ==
=== Origins ===
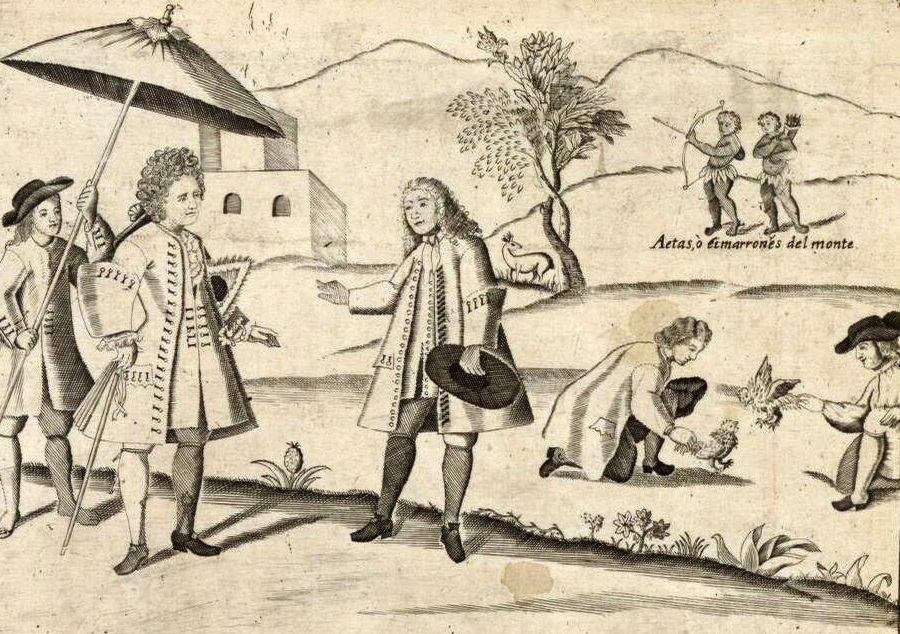
In this illustration from the 1734 Carta Hydrographica y Chorographica de las Yslas Filipinas, two Filipino natives can be seen engrossed over a cockfight Philippines Gamblers, cockfighting 19th century. By José Honorato Lozano.

Even before the Spanish colonization, gambling is said to have already been present in the Philippines. Although there are no exact records when gambling was first practiced in the archipelago, it is possible that some forms were introduced by the Chinese in the late sixteenth century. Due to the proximity of the two countries, many local Chinese would go to the Philippines for business and profit, engaging in different trades and activities. On Magellan’s voyage to the Philippines, it was noted in the accounts of Antonio Pigafetta, that he had already witnessed bets being placed on cockfights when his ship arrived in Palawan in 1521.

=== Growing popularity ===
During the Spanish colonial period, gambling became institutionalized in the forms of cockpits, card parlours, billiard halls, and the like. Around the early to mid-19th century, lotteries and horseracing had been introduced. Casinos had also been established at that time. It had then become a problem for the Spanish colonizers; it was noted in the account of Antonio Morga that men in Manila had grown accustomed to gamble for enormous and excessive stakes, and gambling had become prevalent in all sectors of society. Due to its detrimental effects, the colonial government took steps to suppress these activities, but this had little effect and by majority of the 19th century, this had become a national phenomenon.

Cockfighting, in particular, was a favorite pastime in the Philippines. Nearly every village had its own cockpit, and the activity had its own system for how it is to be played, as well as the fees paid, days performed, and others. Visitors in the country would note the amount of care which the roosters were treated, and most visitors would attend a cockpit during their stay. According to the number of arrests made by the police in the late 19th century, it is probable that the presence of cockfighting may have encouraged other forms of gambling. This led to even more edicts, enforcement, and penalties, where the government set certain days and times of the day for it to be allowed. This, however, still proved difficult to control due to its prevalence, and was significantly decriminalized later on when the government opened the country to foreign trade and overseas markets due to the need for internal sources of revenue. This carried on until the American occupation.

Like the Spaniards, the Americans initially tried to ban gambling, but later on, betting was re-introduced around 1912. American insular authorities then decided that gambling cannot be controlled, and it was better to earn funds from this than to prohibit it. Institutionalized gambling for charitable purposes began in the 1930s, where horse racing was allowed for the benefit of the Philippine Athletic Amateur Federation (now the Philippine Olympic Committee), and since then only civic associations were allowed to hold horse races for fundraising. These were controlled by the organization called the National Charity Sweepstakes. Legislation in the country then changed around mid-1930s to institutionalize the sweepstakes in order to raise funds to promote public health and general welfare. National Charity Sweepstakes was then changed to Philippine Charity Sweepstakes Office (PCSO).

After the colonial period, the Philippine government took responsibility in overseeing gambling activities in the country. In 1976, during the Martial Law Era, the Philippine Amusement and Gaming Corporation (PAGCOR) was created by the government to regulate the ten gaming casinos that existed before the pre-EDSA era. The agency aimed for government regulation and centralization of all games of chance under existing franchises or permitted by law. By 1985, the coverage and privileges of PAGCOR were expanded, and the agency and casinos were constantly improved unto the 1990s. Bingo and the lottery had also been developed under PAGCOR. Within the 20th century, PAGCOR experienced both dips and hikes in income growth rate, which mostly depended on the visits of foreign big-time players, but was also largely affected by the Asian financial crisis in 1997. During dips in income growth rate, the agency would increase efforts by branching out to new ventures such as Bingo and Jai Alai.

Since then, various forms of gambling have been introduced and improved, and continue to spread and prevail all over the country. Recently, because President Rodrigo Duterte has initiated to mend the relations between the Philippines and China, Chinese visitors in the country are expected to increase, and this possibly attracts more investments. This puts the Philippines in competition with Macau and Singapore to become a gambling hub that targets Asia's rising middle class.

== Government agencies and firms ==
Philippine Amusement and Gaming Corporation (PAGCOR)

In the Philippines, number games and games of chance are regulated, controlled, and under the direct supervision of centralized government agencies. The most well known of these agencies, Philippine Amusement and Gaming Corporation (PAGCOR), both operates and licenses gambling casinos, gaming clubs, and other similar recreational spaces. PAGCOR, as stated in former President Ferdinand Marcos' Presidential Decree No. 1067-A, was created as a result of the compelling need for the government to intervene in the proliferation of illegal casinos and clubs that conduct games of chance in a rampant manner. PAGCOR aims to do so by centralizing and integrating the right and authority to operate and conduct games of chance into one corporate entity to be controlled, administered, and supervised by the government. While PAGCOR holds the authority and power to authorize, license, and regulate games of chance, games of cards, and games of numbers, however, this authority does not extend to games authorized, licensed, or regulated by existing franchises or other regulatory bodies, special laws such as Republic Act No. 7922, and local government units. According to the decree, the operation of games of chance will serve as an additional source of revenue to fund various socio-civic projects such as flood control programs, beautification, sewage projects, and other public services. In addition to the creation of such projects, PAGCOR aims to "minimize, if not totally eradicate, the evils, mal-practices and corruptions that normally are found prevalent in the conduct and operation of gambling clubs and casinos without direct government involvement."

Philippine Charity Sweepstakes Office (PCSO)

The Philippine Charity Sweepstakes Office also known as PCSO is the government agency that organizes and conducts number games in the form of sweepstakes and lottery games. They do this in order to support and raise funds for health and welfare-related programs in the country. The products that they offer include EZ2 Lotto, GrandLotto 6/55, Suertres Lotto, UltaLotto 6/58, 4 Digit, Lotto Express (KENO), 6 Digit, Small Town Lottery, Lotto 6/42, Sweepstakes Tickets, MegaLotto 6/45, Scratch It Tickets, SuperLotto 6/49 and KASCASH Ticket. Winners of each game are given cash prizes.

While the Philippine Racing Commission regulates horse racing in the country, the Games and Amusement Board handles the betting aspects involving the discipline.

== Privately owned companies ==
=== Integrated resorts ===
Fitch, in a 2017 report titled Eye in the Sky Series: Philippines Gaming Jurisdiction Surveillance Monitor, lists the following firms as major participants in the Philippine gambling resorts industry: Travellers International Hotel Group, Bloomberry Resorts Corp., Melco Crown and Belle Corporation, and Tiger Resorts. Travellers, a joint venture between Genting Hong Kong and local conglomerate Alliance Global established the first private casino in the country, Resorts World Manila at the Entertainment City development in Metro Manila. Tiger Resorts operates Okada Manila while Bloomberry, Melco Crown and Belle also operate their own casinos in the area.

=== Online gambling ===
President Rodrigo Duterte in 2016 started the Philippine Offshore Gaming Operations (POGO) program to allow online gambling in major cities. Under POGO, the state-owned Philippine Amusement and Gaming Corporation issued licenses to be used for service providers to offer online gambling. Most of the companies which obtained POGO licenses were Chinese, and their businesses primarily catered to the ethnic Chinese community at-large. Gambling is generally illegal in China, but the Chinese domestic consumer market for gambling is significant.

Some online gambling firms under PAGCOR include PhilWeb and DFNN.

Local firm, PhilWeb was known for its E-Games network which was shut down by the government. Online POGO registered firms based in the country include Dafabet which serves the Asia Pacific market. Dafabet SBOBET and other POGOs are often shirt sponsors of football clubs in the United Kingdom in order to circumvent bans on print or social media advertising in mainland China.

The Chinese government sought to persuade the Philippines to ban online gambling. In the view of the Chinese government, online gaming undermines Chinese financial institutions and creates crime and social problems in China. The Duterte government did not want to restrain the online gaming industry because of the huge revenues it produced for the state, although after an August 2019 meeting between Duterte and General Secretary of the Chinese Communist Party Xi Jinping, the Philippines increased its raids on illegal gambling operators. After the election of presidential election of Bongbong Marcos, the Philippines took a harsher stance against online gambling, and in September 2022, the Philippines Department of Justice announced that it would shut down more than 100 online gambling operators and deport approximately 40,000 Chinese nationals working in the online gambling sector.

== Types of gambling ==
=== Legal ===
==== Casino ====
Casinos are venues where people go to in order to engage in legal gambling activities usually for entertainment and earning's sake. Gambling in casinos are usually played via cards and casino chips, slot machines, and more. Some of the games that are often played in casinos include poker, blackjack, roulette, and slot machines.

==== Sweepstakes ====
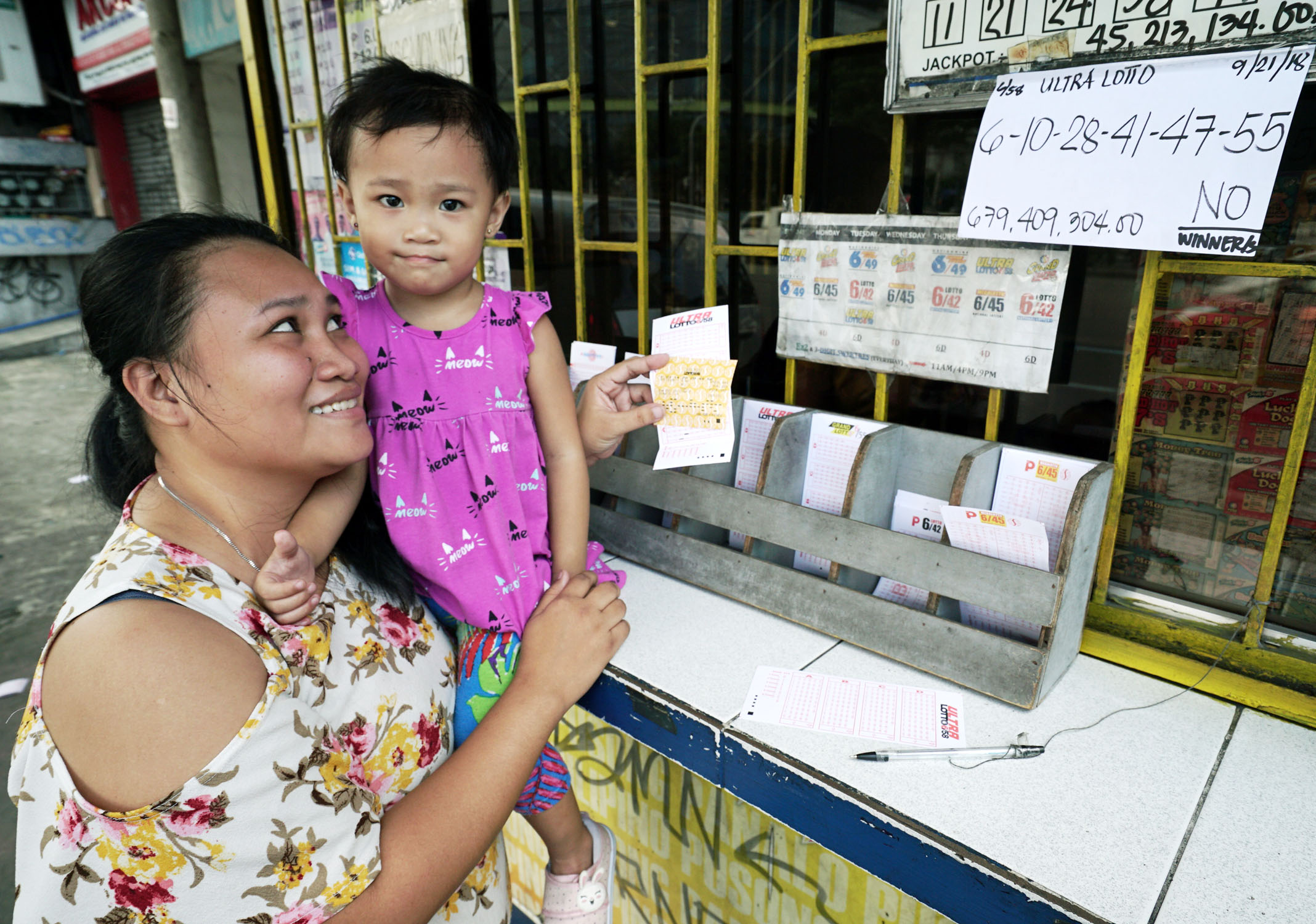
A woman place her bet on the Ultra Lotto 6/58.

Sweepstake games are contests where the winner can take all the prize.

Lotteries in the Philippines are held by the Philippine Charity Sweepstakes Office (PCSO). How it works is that there are 6 numbers randomly drawn within a certain range of numbers, depending on the type of lottery. There are several types of lottery made by the PCSO, such as the Lotto 6/42, Megalotto 6/45, Superlotto 6/49, etc. The person whose chosen lottery numbers in the card matches that of the ones drawn by the host wins the jackpot prize, but the amount of money of the prize depends on the type of lottery, as well as how many of the chosen numbers in the card match the numbers that were drawn .:

==== Horse race betting ====
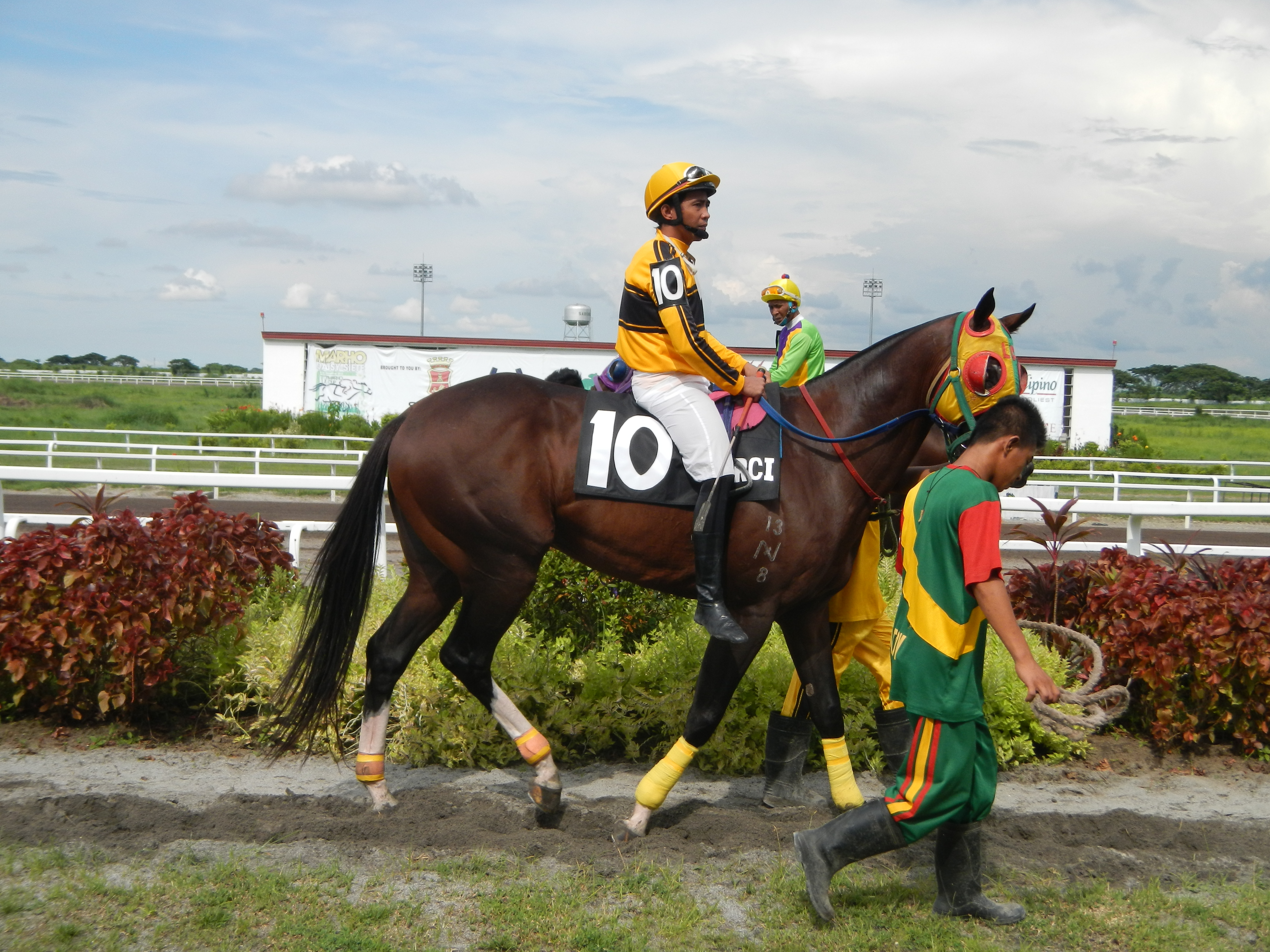
A race horse.

In horse race betting, people bet their money on which horses will win the race. People bet by giving their betting money to the selling windows or betting stations, then they claim their prizes there, if they win their bets. People can bet on multiple horses for higher chances of winning, and can choose among different types of horse race betting. Some of the different types of betting are win, place, show, Double Quinella, Forecast, Trifecta, Quartet, Daily Double, Pick 4, and Pick 6, etc.

1. For win type, in order to win, the horse you're betting on has to be 1st place.
2. For place type, the horse you're betting on needs to win 1st or 2nd in order for you to win.
3. For show type, the horse you're betting on needs to win 1st, 2nd, or 3rd in order for you to win.
4. For Double Quinella, the horses you're betting on needs to win 1st and 2nd in either order.
5. For Forecast, the horses you're betting on needs to win 1st and 2nd in exact order.
6. For Trifecta the horses you're betting on needs to win 1st, 2nd, and 3rd in exact order.
7. For Quartet, the horses you're betting on needs to win 1st, 2nd, 3rd, and 4th in exact order.
8. For Daily Double, the horses you're betting on needs to win the 2 consecutive races.
9. For Pick 4, the horses you're betting on needs to win 4 consecutive races.
10. For Pick 6, the horses you're betting on needs to win 6 consecutive races.

==== Cock-fighting ====
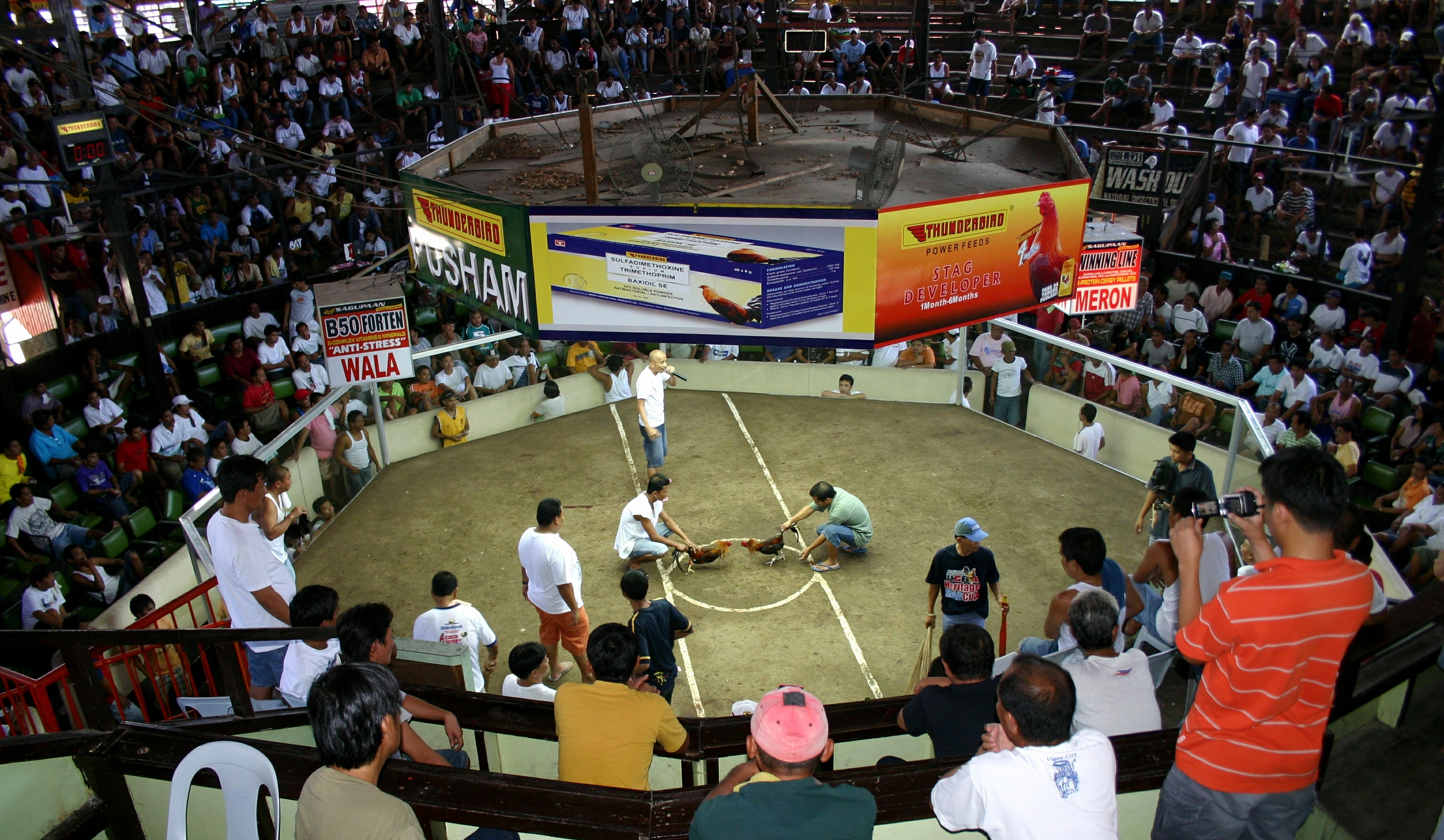

Cock-fighting is a sport wherein 2 cocks that have been carefully bred and specially fed wrestle each other inside cockpit arenas until one dies or is unable to go on and the people bet their money on which cock will win. Most cockpits have a maximum of 10 minutes of fighting time. The victorious cock gets treatment and medicine after the fight and gets a break of around 3 to 5 months before fighting again while the losing cock which is dead is usually consumed by either the winning owner of the cock as a prize, or by other people.

=== Illegal ===
==== Jueteng ====
List of jueteng numbers from bettors at different times of the day

Jueteng is an illegal numbers game that is a form of local lottery and is popular in the country due to its nature. The game was probably introduced during the Spanish colonization, and like cockfighting, it was done so by Chinese entrepreneurs. The name itself comes from the Chinese characters hue, meaning flower, and teng meaning to bet. It involves the combination of 37 numbers against 37 numbers, (38 numbers in some areas), numbered 1 to 37, and bets are placed and accepted per combination. The game is usually played by choosing a combination of two numbers from 1 to 37, then little numbered balls (bolitas) are shaken in a basket (usually a rattan basket) and two balls are drawn before witnesses.

The estimated gross revenue of the game varies, but it can reach to up to $500 million. Around thirty percent of this is paid as protection money to law enforcers and political figures, then another thirty is for the surplus of the operator, and the rest is for winnings, shares of employees, and expenses. Among those cited for their alleged extensive involvement in jueteng operations include Charlie "Atong" Ang, Rodolfo "Bong" Pineda, and Tony "Bolok" Santos of Marikina.

There are several reasons why the numbers game has prevailed despite its illegality:

1. Jueteng bets are low, as low as ₱0.25 or ₱1.00, and a bettor can win up to ₱400 to ₱1000, depending on total revenue and number of bettors.
2. Jueteng operations require minimal costs and assets. The draw or bola can be done anywhere at any time.
3. Transactions do not take much time, unlike other forms of gambling (e.g. Bingo, cockfighting, etc.).
4. There are many cases where it is protected by law enforcers or government officials.
5. There is much support from the locals.
6. There is local superstition to use draw bets based from birthdays, deaths, special occasions, dreams, etc.

One of the biggest scandals concerning jueteng involved former Philippine President Joseph Estrada in 2000 called the Juetengate. Estrada was accused by Senate Minority Leader Teofisto Guingona on October 5, 2000, of receiving cash payouts from jueteng as protection. Days later, Luis "Chavit" Singson claimed that, as Estrada's bagman, he had given Estrada around ₱400 million from jueteng collections nationwide, with cockfighting magnate Atong Ang acting as an intermediary in Estrada's jueteng transactions. This triggered the second EDSA revolution from January 17 to 20, 2001 and the eventual ouster of Estrada from the presidency.

==== Masiao ====
A related numbers game, played predominately in Visayas and Mindanao, is known as masiao. Masiao originally was played based on radio broadcasts announcing the winning players in jai alai. However, as jai alai's popularity has waned, illegal masiao operators now often base their winning numbers on the official ones announced by the PCSO.

==== Last Two ====
An illegal numbers game where the winning combination is derived from the last two numbers of the first prize of the winning Sweepstakes ticket which comes out during the weekly draw of the Philippine Charity Sweepstakes Office (PCSO), and its variants.

== Prevalence in various regions ==
=== Cultural gambling ===
==== Seasonal Perya Games ====
Perya Games are real money games played within the Perya stalls. Perya is a seasonal event with special permits given by the Local Government during fiesta celebrations only. Perya is allowed on a 30–60 days permit. Perya real money games such as color game, beto-beto, sakla, number ball, etc. are popular in the Philippines considering its very easy to understand and play. However, these games may not be covered by the permit granted by the Local Government since games of chance are only authorized by the Philippine Gaming Corporation (PAGCOR) under existing laws. Under the Local Government Code, permit can be granted to a Perya for activities not involving gambling such as rides and fun games. The Mayor and Barangay Captain have no power to grant permits for games of chance. Unless Perya operators secure a permit from PAGCOR, Perya games are considered illegal in the Philippines.

==== Street games ====
People from corners of the street sometimes play simple games like pusoy dos, mahjong, tongits, and sakla, where money is on the line.

==== Blood sports ====
Betting on contests pitting two animals against one another in a fight to the death is a way of life for many males in the country's hinterlands.

- Year-round blood sports

Sabong or cockfighting

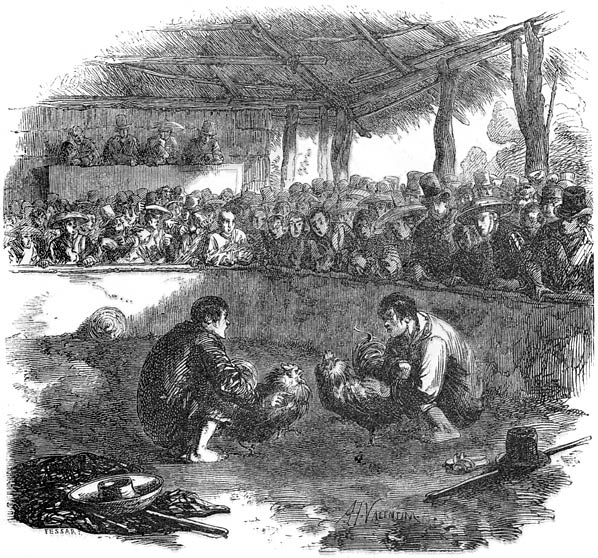

Every weekend, arenas across the Philippines are packed with thousands of men anxious to legally wager on fights featuring roosters with razor-sharp gaffs fitted to their legs. The sheer spectacle of such an event-with its fast pace, noise, gore, and crowd participation-has done much to establish cockfighting as the national sport of the Philippines.

- Blood sports during local feasts

1. Horse Fights by the T’boli of Lake Sebu in Southern Cotabato every September
2. Festival of the Bulls, the town of San Joaquin held in January

- Seasonal blood sports

Spider Wrestling

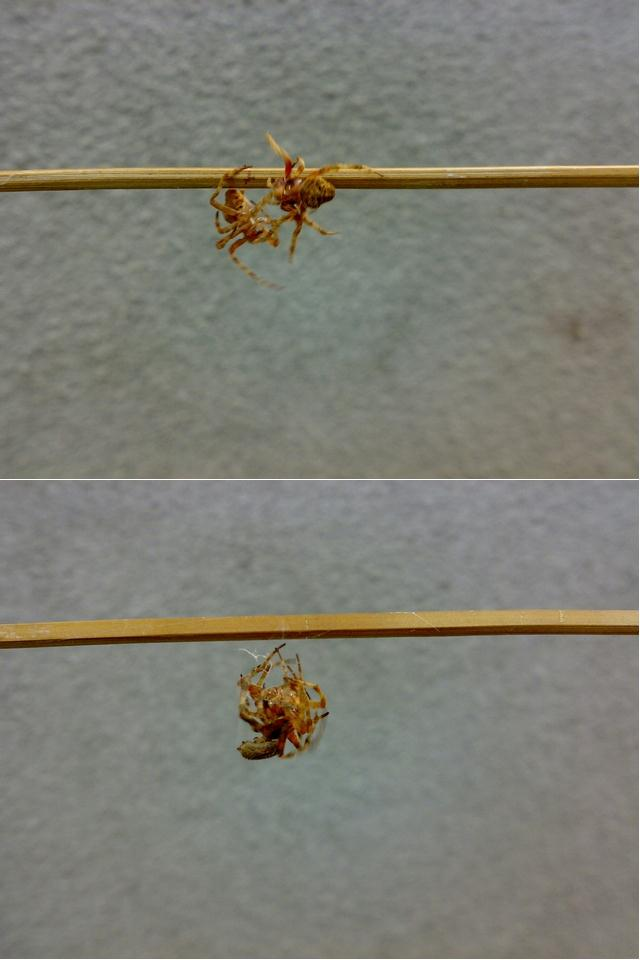

Season: Spider wrestling does not occur year round. It is a seasonal activity that typically begins during the rainy season when vegetation is lush and spiders are plentiful. From September through January, groups of boys can be seen roaming the countryside in search of the perfect wrestling spider. Invariably, this takes place outdoors since household spiders (gagambang bahay) are considered poor fighters. Hunts can last up to several hours and normally happen in the morning or late afternoon when spiders return to the center of their webs and are easily captured.

Gambling Behavior: As a form of petty gambling, spider fighting is simple and straightforward. Side bets and other wagers not directly related to the outcome of a bout tend to be rare. Matches can take place almost anywhere and require minimal cost to participate in them. Although most schoolboys have little in terms of material wealth, they rarely agree to a contest without something of value at stake. The primary wager is customarily between the two spider owners. These bets usually involve the exchange of money or the spiders themselves. When cash is wagered, amounts tend to be low. Most bets do not exceed P100, although some occasionally reach into the P1,000-P2,000 range. When fighting spiders are wagered, matches tend to be less serious and, as a rule, not permitted to continue to the death. Anyone can bet on a spider-wrestling contest. Much of the action surrounding a match takes place among the friends and classmates of those directly involved. Their participation adds an air of excitement that would otherwise be missed if wagering were limited strictly to spider owners. Spectators generally bet in small amounts, though sometimes friends will pool their funds to increase the size of a payoff. Since there are no bookies or odds-makers to influence the stakes of a contest, betting is usually a matter of personal preference; but sod pressure does exist for boys to wager on their bends' spiders. Given the short duration of most bouts, cash will change hands frequently. An implicit honor system is followed when it comes to collecting or paying bets. When participants are not well acquainted, money is usually entrusted with a neutral third party until a winner is declared. If a loser should try to renege on a bet, trouble is likely to occur.

=== During funerals ===
In the Philippines, gambling is not just a pastime, but a way to honor the dead. Betting games, mah jong, and card tables are often set up at Filipino wakes, or paglalamay, where the tradition is to keep a 24-hour vigil over the deceased until the burial. Making wagers at games such as "sakla", the Philippine version of Spanish tarot cards, is particularly common at wakes, because the family of the deceased gets a share of the winnings to help cover funeral expenses.

“It has its functions, it is a way of keeping mourners around,” Randolf David, a sociology professor at the University of the Philippines, told Reuters. Businesses dedicated to operating these games go from one wake to another, David said. He added that small syndicates often operate such games, moving from one wake to another.

Popular games include, but are not limited to, Sakla (a version of tarot cards), bingo, poker, and mahjong. Even the kids get in on the action by betting on fighting spiders. The practice of gambling at wakes is so popular (and viewed as mostly legal) that gaming syndicates reportedly organize “fake” wakes in order to provide a venue for serious gamblers. Because of the general lack of enforcement at funerals, and the slightly more stringent limits on gaming otherwise, there has been a measure of success with the business. Apparently, obtaining a stand-in corpse for these fake wakes is as simple as renting one from the local morgue. Oftentimes, these rented (or sometimes even purchased) bodies are unclaimed corpses. For morgues, the motivation to participate in this trade is rather high as renting them out (at whatever price) is going to be more than what it would cost to store them.

== Laws and regulations ==
As gambling is allowable in the Philippines, there are certain laws in the Constitution that people must obey and be aware of in order to avoid penalties. In the Philippines you have to be at least 21 years old to play in casinos.

Republic Act No. 9287 is an act increasing the penalties for illegal number games, amending certain provisions of Presidential Decree No. 1602, and for other purposes.

== Economic aspects ==
The Philippines is rising steadily in the gaming industry, slowly establishing itself as one of the gambling capitals of Southeast Asia. It boasts more casinos than Macau, the Asian gambling giant who receives the majority of its income from gambling operations.

In Metro Manila alone, there are around 20 casinos. Prominent casinos include Solaire Resort and Casino and City of Dreams Manila. Calabarzon, located south of Manila, has 5 casinos while the Visayas and Mindanao have around 10 gambling areas. There are also plans to expand into areas like Cebu City and Cagayan de Oro. This abundance of casinos and gaming areas aided in the 17% growth of the gambling industry in 2015. The reported gross revenue for 2015 was PHP 130 billion, a significant increase from 2014's PHP 111 billion.

Much of this growth can be attributed to Manila's Entertainment City, which consists of first-class casinos and hotels. These hotels and casinos are a huge source of tourism, which brings in additional revenue for the country.

=== Online gambling ===
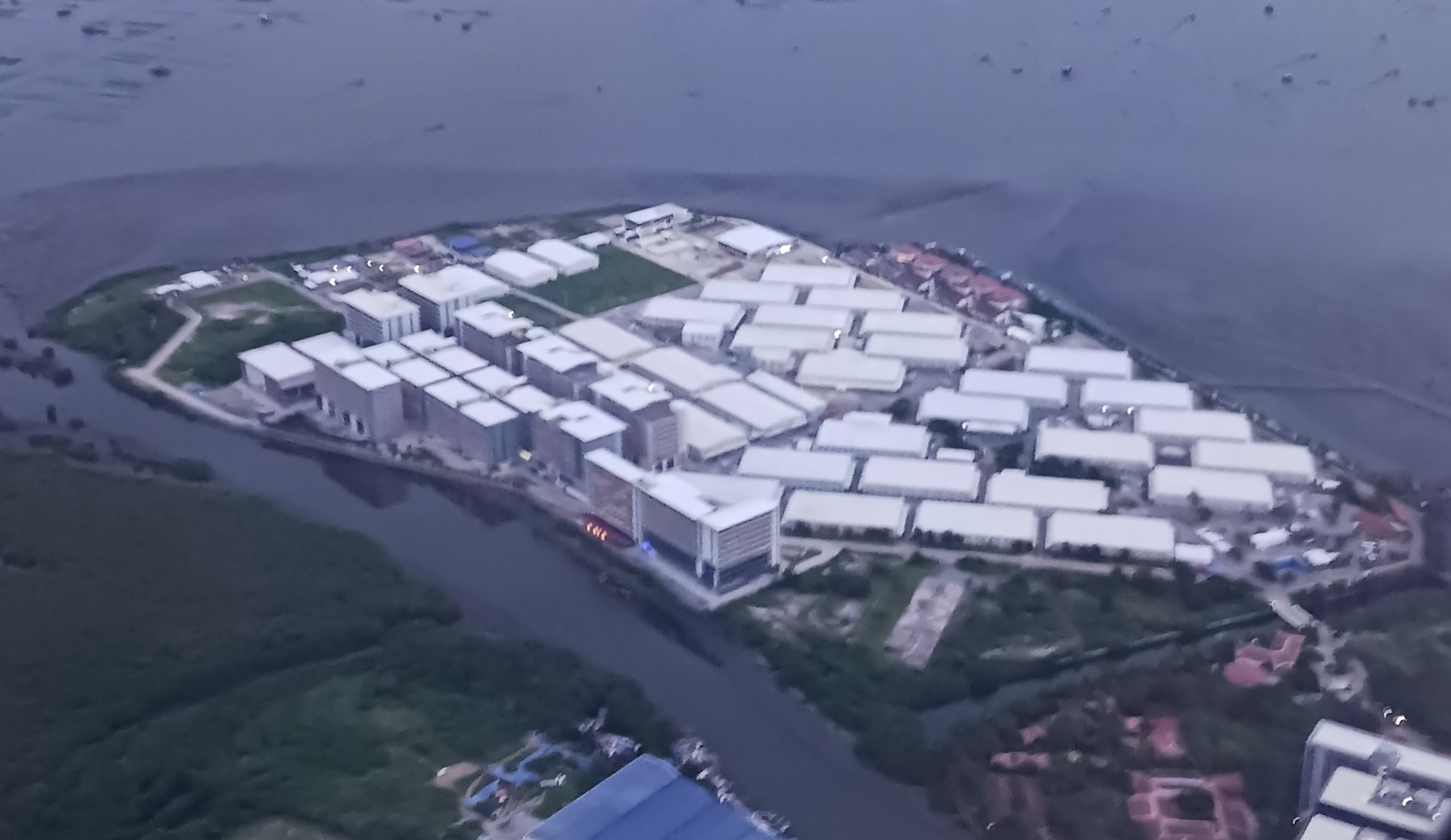
Island Cove POGO hub at Kawit, Cavite in 2023

Online gambling, specifically licensed Philippine Offshore Gaming Operators (POGOs) that cater to registered players outside the Philippines, have rapidly grown in number. According to the Manila Standard, the online gambling industry in 2017 was the second biggest demand driver for office space in the Philippines. In just the first six months of 2017, online gambling has taken up 83,960 square meters of office space, most of which are centered in areas like Alabang and Bonifacio Global City. It is estimated that online gambling will take up 400,000 to 500,000 square meters office space in 2017.

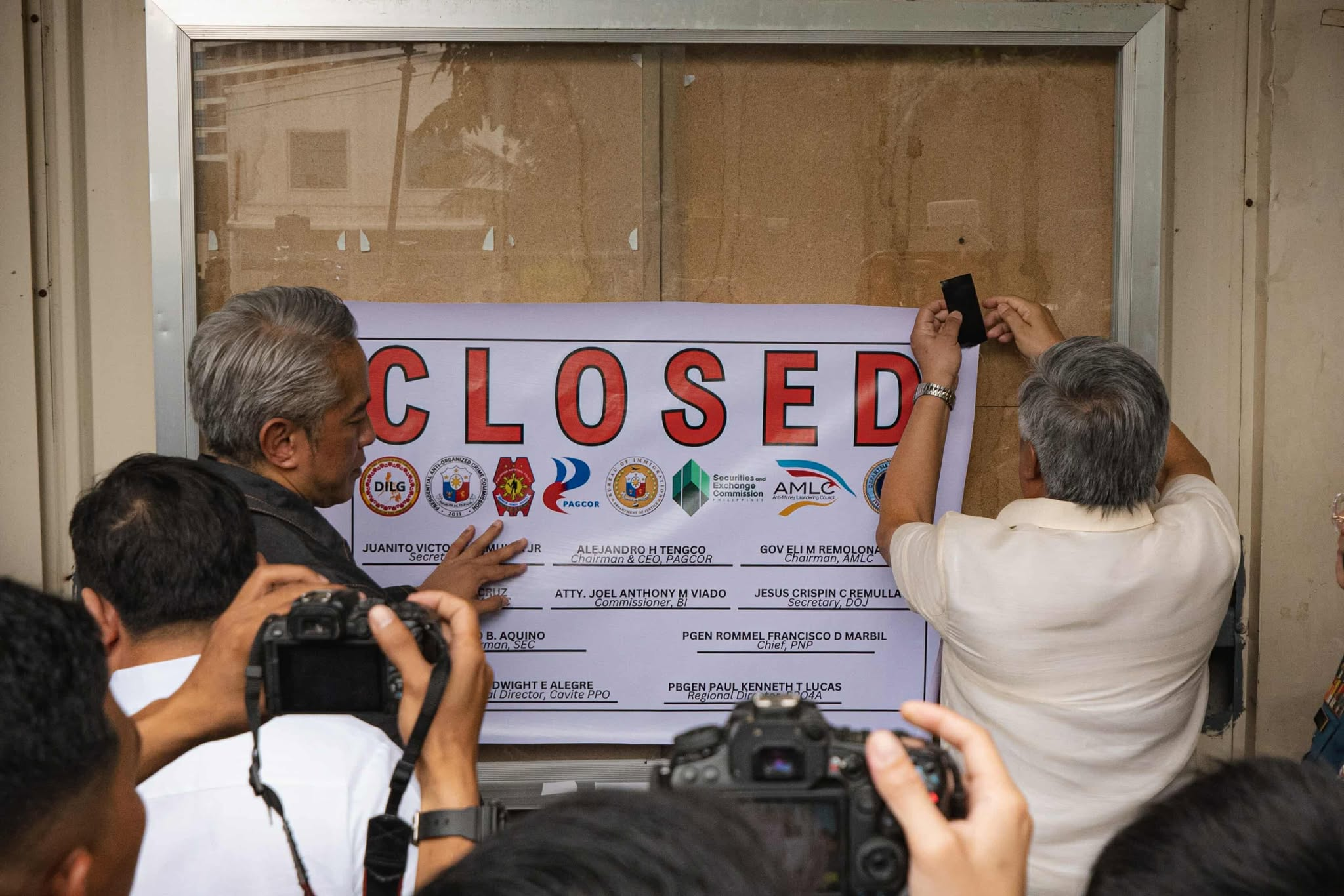
Formal closure of the Island Cove

In late 2016, PAGCOR issued 35 offshore gaming licenses and made over PHP1 billion in licensing and processing fees. Application and processing fees amount to $50,000 for online casinos and $40,000 for sports betting, plus another $200,000 and $150,000 respectively upon the approval of each license. Popular online gaming sites include Betway Casino and Winner Casino.

In July 2024, it was announced that all Philippine Offshore Gaming Operators (POGOs) would cease operations by the end of the year. This decision followed increased scrutiny over alleged links to illegal activities, including fraud and trafficking. PAGCOR confirmed the closures, marking the end of POGO operations in the country.

== Societal impact and effects ==
=== Cultural impact ===
Gambling has contributed to the Philippines' culture and identity ever since its introduction and rise in popularity in the country. Similar to other East and Southeast Asian countries, the Philippines has developed a reputation of a gambling society. This culture of gambling permeates various sectors of the Philippine society, most primarily the rural males. According to the social anthropologist, Per Binde, “Gambling is a social, cultural and economic phenomenon, a remarkably flexible way of redistributing wealth, which is embedded in the socio‐cultural systems of societies.”

For the Philippine nation, which is predominantly subscribed to the Catholic religion, the issue of gambling also has moral impacts. In January 2005, the Catholic Bishops' Conference of the Philippines (CBCP) released a statement on their stand and collective policy for gambling. In July 2025, the CBCP likened online gambling to a plague epidemic; its president, Cardinal Pablo Virgilio David, criticized the government for fueling online gambling addiction, describing the Internet as a "digital highway" where people fall to new forms of exploitation.

Game of chances have served various purposes in the local life of Filipinos, including peer relations and as recreational activities. Although it was seen before as a platform for deviance and criminality, gambling has also evolved into a social activity since its legalization.

=== Money laundering ===
Seal of the Anti-Money Laundering Council Philippines

By INTERPOL definition, money laundering is "any act or attempted act to conceal or disguise the identity of illegally obtained proceeds so that they appear to have originated from legitimate sources". Large sums of money coming from gambling or any money from illegal gambling is considered as “dirty money”, and can be used to file money laundering cases. The U.S. Department of State said in its International Narcotics Control Strategy Report in March 2017 that “criminal groups already take advantage of Philippine casinos to transfer “illicit proceeds from the Philippines to offshore accounts,” and that the country's gaming palaces have “high risks for money laundering.

One of the biggest money laundering cases in the Philippines so far happened in February 2016, known as the Bangladesh Bank robbery or bank heist. $81 million of the money stolen from the Bangladesh Bank was laundered into Philippine casinos via transfer requests and the SWIFT network. Another $850 million was supposed to be wired to personal bank accounts in the Philippines, but was blocked by authorities.

In 2012, Philippine lawmakers managed to exclude casinos from the roster of organizations required to report to the Anti-Money Laundering Council regarding suspicious transactions. However in May 2017, despite the lobbying of the gaming industry, the Philippine Congress, under the Duterte administration, approved an amendment to a money laundering law to cover gambling. Casinos would, under the proposed amendment, be required to report accumulated bets totaling 3 million pesos ($60,000) to the country's anti-money laundering body within a 24-hour period.

=== Gambling addiction ===
According to its medical definition, gambling addiction or pathological gambling is the disorder of impulse control in which a person makes wagers of various types—in casinos, at horse races, to book-makers—which compromises, disrupts, or damages personal, family, or vocational pursuits. Psychiatrist Ivanhoe Escartin of the Philippine Psychiatric Association (PPA) said that winning in gambling can get players hooked because of the “pleasure” of winning, which they want to feel again. But even when losing, gambling can become a compulsive habit because the players tend to try to recoup their losses.

In the Philippines, PAGCOR is the government arm that regulates authorized gaming establishments around the country. It implements its Code of Practice for Responsible Gaming in all its PAGCOR-operated gaming areas and licensed entities in authorized gaming establishments to prevent gambling addiction and minimize potential harm to individual players and the community. This responsible gaming program includes training of gaming employees, limited access, probity measures, and advertising guidelines, among others.

Another intervention done by Philippine casinos under PAGCOR is the exclusion program, which prohibits problem gamers from all gaming venues or sites. Relatives of problem gamers or they themselves apply for the program in an attempt to prevent the worsening of gambling tendencies.

== See also ==
- Gambling in Metro Manila
- Philippine Lottery Draw
- Bingo in the Philippines
- List of casinos in the Philippines
- Tlcbet
- 2017 Resorts World Manila attack
