= List of casinos in the Philippines =

This is a list of casinos in the Philippines; it includes exclusive slot machine VIP clubs. In 1977 the Philippine Amusement and Gaming Corporation (PAGCOR), a government-owned and controlled corporation, was established to conduct and regulate gaming clubs and casinos in the country.

== Luzon ==
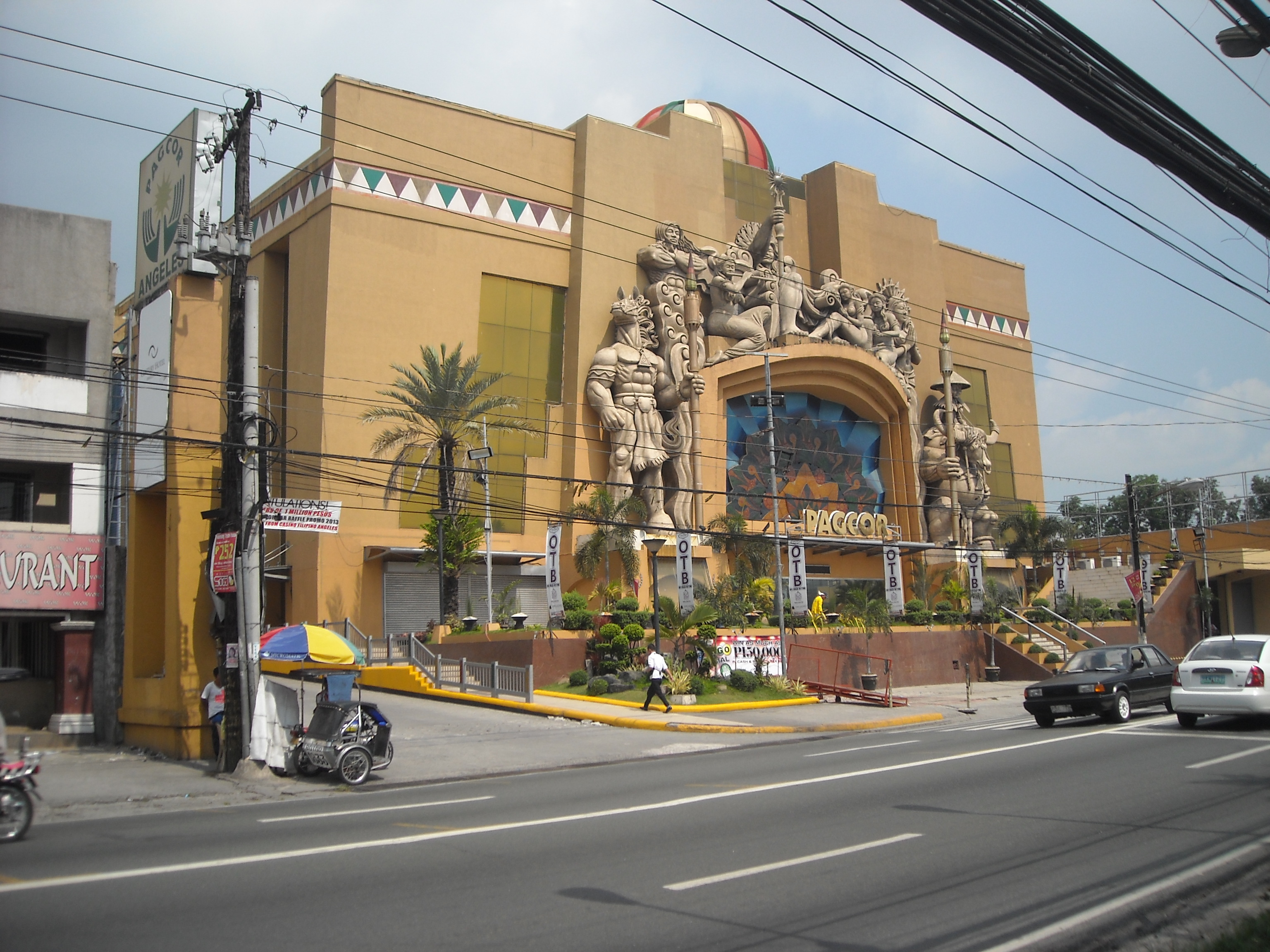
Casino Filipino Angeles in Angeles City

=== Central Luzon ===
- Golden Nile Bar & Casino, Angeles City
- Wild Orchid Resort & Poker Room, Angeles City
- Casino Filipino Angeles, Angeles City
- Casino Filipino Olongapo, Olongapo
- Subic Venecia Casino, Subic Bay Freeport Zone, Olongapo
- Oriental Paradise Casino, Subic Bay Freeport Zone, Olongapo
- Royce Hotel and Casino, Clark, Mabalacat, Pampanga
- Casino Plus, Clark, Mabalacat, Pampanga
- Hann Resorts, Clark, Mabalacat, Pampanga

=== Metro Manila ===
Metro Manila currently has around twenty casinos mostly located near Bay City and the Ninoy Aquino International Airport in Parañaque.

- Casino Filipino Binondo, Binondo
- Casino Filipino Citystate, Ermita
- Casino Filipino Malabon, Malabon
- Casino Filipino Santa Cruz, Santa Cruz
- Casino Filipino Universal, Santa Cruz
- City of Dreams Manila, Entertainment City, Parañaque
- Club Tropicana Las Piñas, Almanza, Las Piñas
- Club Tropicana Santa Mesa, Santa Mesa
- Empire Poker Sports Club, Ortigas Center, Pasig
- Lancaster Hotel, Ortigas Center, Mandaluyong
- Madison Square Garden Hotel and Casino, Buayang Bato, Mandaluyong
- Malabon Grand Hotel, Potrero, Malabon
- Manila Grand Opera Hotel and Casino, Santa Cruz
- Master Poker Sports Club, Bel-Air Village, Makati
- Metro Card Club, Ortigas Center, Pasig
- Midas Hotel and Casino, San Rafael, Pasay
- Midas Touch Poker Sports Club, Oranbo, Pasig
- Networld Hotel Spa and Casino, San Isidro, Pasay
- New World Manila Bay Hotel and Casino, Malate
- Okada Manila, Entertainment City, Parañaque
- Resorts World Manila, Newport City, Pasay
- Sheraton Manila Bay, Malate
- Sofitel Philippine Plaza Hotel, CCP Complex, Pasay
- Solaire Resort & Casino, Entertainment City, Parañaque
- Waterfront Manila Pavilion Hotel and Casino, Ermita
- Winford Hotel and Casino, Santa Cruz

=== Calabarzon ===
- Casino Filipino San Pedro, San Pedro, Laguna
- Casino Filipino Tagaytay, Tagaytay, Cavite
- Casino Filipino Cavite, Bacoor, Cavite
- Casino Filipino Laguna, Sta. Rosa, Laguna

== Visayas ==
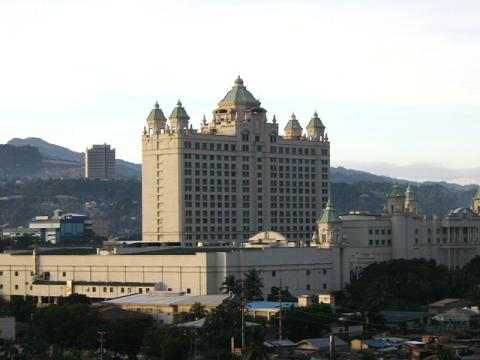
Waterfront Cebu City Hotel & Casino (2007)

=== Western Visayas ===
- Casino Filipino Bacolod, Bacolod
- Arcade-Amigo Hotel, Iloilo City

=== Central Visayas ===
- Nustar Resort & Casino, Cebu City
- Waterfront Cebu City Hotel & Casino, Cebu City

== Mindanao ==
- Apoview Casino, Davao City
- Casino Filipino Davao, Davao City

== Philippine-based offshore casinos ==
- PAGCOR POGO Hub Covelandia (First Orient International Ventures), Kawit, Cavite

== See also ==
- Gambling in the Philippines
