= Resorts World Manila attack =

2017 shooting and arson in the Philippines

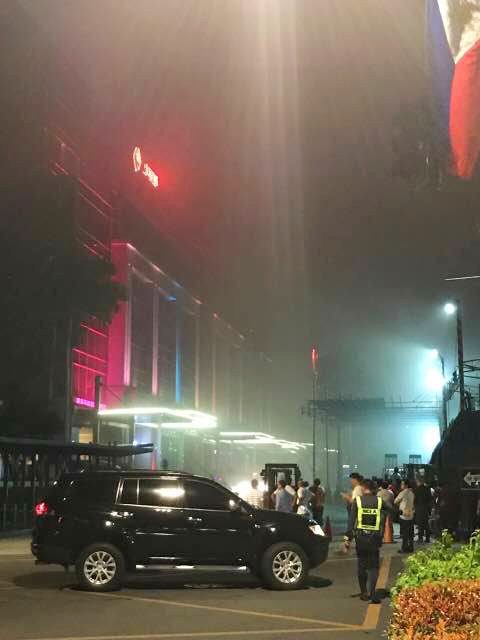
- Resorts World Manila immediately after the attack showing smoke coming from the fire inside the casino
- Location of the main attack in Pasay, along with the shooting in Paco, Manila linked to the same perpetrator hours earlier. 1 Resorts World Manila; 2 Paco Park
- Location: Main attack: Resorts World Manila complex, Pasay, Metro Manila, Philippines; Linked shooting: near Paco Park, Paco, Manila, Metro Manila, Philippines
- Date: June 1, 2017 – June 2, 2017 c. 10:00 pm (at Paco); 12:03 am – 1:46 am (at Pasay) (PhST GMT+8)
- Target: Resorts World Manila
- Attack type: Armed robbery, shootout and arson
- Weapons: Paco: 9mm Tanfoglio semi-automatic pistol; Pasay: Bushmaster M4-type Carbine; .380-caliber Tanfoglio semi-automatic pistol; (Perpetrator's suicide): Gasoline-fueled arson fire
- Deaths: 40 (38 at Pasay, including the perpetrator, 2 at Paco)
- Injuries: 70
- Perpetrator: Jessie Javier Carlos
- Motive: Robbery to repay gambling debts

On June 2, 2017, at 12:03 a.m. PhST (GMT+8), a gunman attacked Resorts World Manila and started fires, causing a stampede which killed 38 people and injured 70 others. Initially thought to be a terrorist attack related to the Marawi crisis in Mindanao, the attack was instead an armed robbery by 42-year-old Jessie Javier Carlos, a former Filipino civil servant. Carlos stole casino chips worth ₱113 million (US$2.24 million). Following confrontation with the responding SWAT team around 1:30 a.m., Carlos broke into a room on the fifth floor of the adjacent Maxims Hotel, committing suicide fifteen minutes later.

The police investigation revealed Carlos was a problem gambler with debts of ₱4 million (US$79,000) by the time of the attack. The investigation linked him to a shooting near Paco Park two hours before the attack, killing two people. The Philippine Senate launched an inquiry into the attack, which revealed security lapses in the hours leading up to the attack. PAGCOR temporarily suspended the license of the hotel. Resorts World Manila rebranded to Newport World Resorts in 2022.

== Background ==
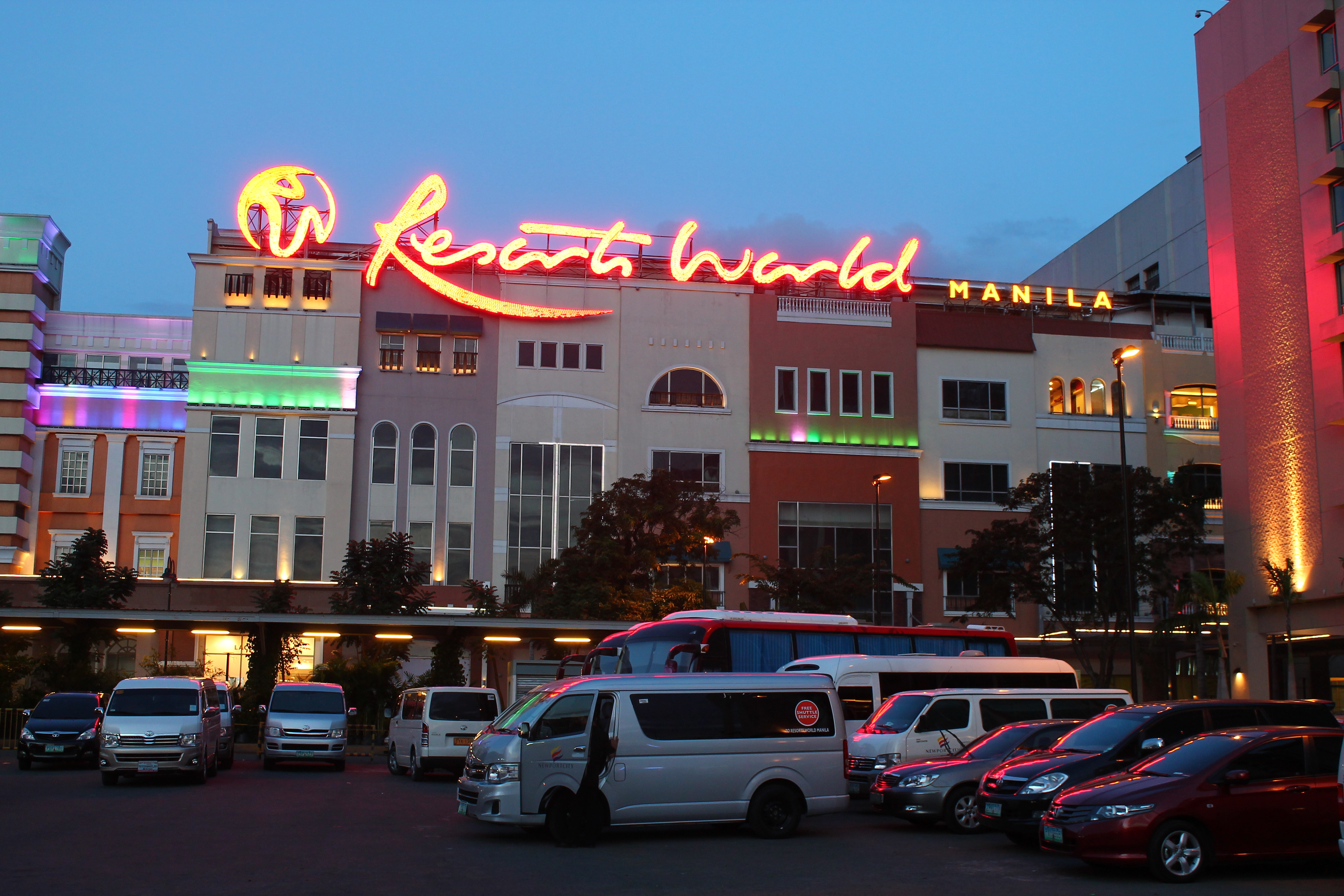
Resorts World Manila in 2012.

Resorts World Manila (now Newport World Resorts) is an integrated entertainment complex containing a casino, bars, and hotels, including Maxims Hotel. The complex is located in Newport City, a tourism hub in Pasay near Terminal 3 of the Ninoy Aquino International Airport.

The attack happened as the southern city of Marawi in Mindanao was under siege by the ISIL-affiliated Maute group, leading to initial speculation of a link between the events. The country had been on high alert for a possible terrorist attack on urban areas since the start of the siege on May 23.

=== Perpetrator ===
On June 4, the National Capital Region Police Office identified the gunman as 42-year-old Jessie Javier Carlos (April 19, 1975 – June 2, 2017), a Philippine citizen and former employee of the Department of Finance who resided in Santa Cruz, Manila.

Initially employed as a tax specialist at a tax credit processing center of the Department of Finance, Carlos was dismissed in 2012 by the Office of the Ombudsman after the Revenue Integrity Protection Service discovered non-declarations and misdeclarations on his statements of assets, liabilities and net worth. Carlos allegedly failed to disclose that he had more wealth in assets than his salary permitted, including a Manila property worth ₱1.1 million (US$22,273) and a two-hectare (4.9-acre) farm in Tanauan, Batangas that he acquired in 2010 for ₱4 million (US$81,000). The court proceedings lasted years and documented Carlos's further business dealings, including his supposedly dormant gun dealing business, Armset Trading, which existed under his wife's name, and his experience earning ₱100,000 (US$2,000) a month as an intermediary during a gold rush in Maragusan.

Police investigation revealed Carlos was a problem gambler, often betting large sums of money, and cited his gambling addiction as the cause of his mounting personal problems and motivation to rob a casino. He had participated in cockfight betting since 2006, and was last active in the scene in Tanauan, where he bred and sold fighting cocks at his farm. To fund his gambling, he sold his farm in November 2016 for half of the asking price of ₱10 million (US$200,755) alongside some of the fighting cocks he reared. His gambling habits led to his separation from his wife and three children and further attempts to sell off private possessions, including his personal vehicle and his home. Carlos had owned the M4 rifle that he used in the attack, which he used as a status symbol during his ownership of the fighting cock farm, and unsuccessfully attempted to sell the firearm to the barangay chairman of Darasa in Tanauan for ₱100,000 (US$2000).

Carlos eventually developed an addiction to gambling at casinos in an attempt to repay his debt from cockfighting and was known to have been a high roller regular at various casinos, although he did not frequent Resorts World Manila. He was eventually banned from entering all casinos on April 3, 2017, upon the request of next of kin. At the time of the attack, Carlos had ₱4 million (US$79,000) of debt to his bank account, in addition to other non-bank-related debt.

In 2023, the Supreme Court en banc reversed the October 2015 decision of the Court of Appeals that convicted Carlos of dishonesty over mistakes in his SALN when he was a government employee; citing the government's failure to comply with procedures under Republic Act No. 6713, which stipulates the code of conduct and ethical standards of public employees and officials. The decision was made public in August.

=== Linked shooting ===
2017 Paco shooting
- Location: Paco, Manila, Philippines
- Date: June 1, 2017 ≈ 10:00 pm
- Attack type: Shooting
- Weapon: 9mm Tanfoglio semi-automatic pistol
- Deaths: 2
- Perpetrator: Jessie Javier Carlos

Following identification of the attacker, further investigation was conducted by Manila police to probe connections between the attack and the deaths of Elmer Mitra Jr. and Alvin Cruzin in Paco, Manila on the night of June 1, two hours before the attack. An informant at the Manila Police District divulged that the suspected murderer was theorized to have been pressured by Mitra and Cruzin, to repay his debt. Police suspected they were murdered by the casino gunman, with similar motives to the casino attack.

Mitra, a 38 year-old lawyer and son of former Pasay prosecutor Elmer Mitra Sr., and Cruzin, age 43, former Manila police officer then casino financier, were thought to have met the suspect at 4 pm on June 1 for coffee, at Maxims Hotel, Resorts World Manila, before the three left in Mitra's dark gray BMW 3 Series. CCTV evidence was also provided of the crash itself, depicting Mitra's car traveling along Paco Park at approximately 10pm, as gunshots were heard by passersby before the car crashed and flipped; an occupant emerged from the wreckage and escaped with a limp (corroborating accounts that the casino gunman was limping before the shooting). Mitra and Cruzin did not emerge and were later discovered dead from gunshot wounds to their heads from behind. A figure matching the suspect's description recorded by another CCTV camera walking to the Carlos' house, then emerging from the house at 11pm in attire and equipment matching the casino gunman. Four 9mm casings, six bullets, and a 9mm Tanfoglio semi-automatic pistol were recovered from the crash, and bloody cargo pants matching the crash footage were found in Carlos' home. On June 22, the Manila Police homicide division chief confirmed the casino gunman was the only suspect in the twin shooting case.

== Attack ==
A few minutes after midnight on June 2, 2017, Carlos carried bottled gasoline and an M4 Bushmaster rifle to the Resorts World Manila casino's second floor for high rollers. Carlos wore a mask and gave no warning before opening fire. The gunfire caused mass panic and some guests were injured in the stampede. People fled from the first and second floors of the building, but some retreated deeper into the building for cover. Reports of an active shooter in the restaurant below the second-floor casino soon followed the initial gunfire. In the evacuated gambling floor of the casino, Carlos doused poker tables and slot machine chairs with petrol and ignited them with a hand-held lighter. At 12:18 am, he broke into a safe room by shooting out door locks with his rifle. He took 113 million Philippine pesos worth of gambling chips (worth US$2.3 million).

Despite no direct injuries by the suspect's gunfire, the burning casino furniture produced toxic smoke that caused at least 36 deaths, including Elizabeth Panlilio Gonzales (wife of Pampanga 3rd District Representative Aurelio Gonzales Jr.), Consolacion Mijares (sister of Representative Gonzales), Eleuterio Reyes (husband of actress Azenith Briones), and one South Korean man who suffered a fatal heart attack. All of the bodies were found within the casino area, most of whom were women located within the building's bathroom. Fifty-four were initially reported injured, including a security guard who accidentally shot himself in panic; the final injury count was seventy.

By 1:30 am, a SWAT team responded with a raid of the mall and casino premises. Following a confrontation with a SWAT unit at a stairwell, shots were fired, Carlos was suspected to be wounded and fled upwards to Maxims Hotel, one of the complex's hotels. At 1:46 am, he shot open the door of Room 510 of the hotel, lit a fire in the corridor, and committed suicide by setting himself on fire in Room 510 and shooting himself in the head.

The gunman's bag containing the stolen chips was recovered in a toilet. His rifle, with its serial number filed off, was recovered alongside a .380 Tanfoglio pistol with an intact serial number.

2017 Resorts World Manila attack
Resorts World Manila attack is located in Metro Manila
Location of Resorts World Manila, where the attack took place

== Investigation ==
=== Identification of the perpetrator and motive ===
Soon after the incident, the Philippine National Police described the attack as perpetrated by a single shooter, refuting prior witness statements that there were two gunmen. Police found the motive was to steal chips from the casino, clearing the casino of employees and guests with warning shots and setting the room ablaze as a distraction or smoke screen.

The Philippine National Police probed for security lapses that may have allowed the gunman to enter the premises. Blood samples left by the bleeding suspect were collected from a stairwell leading to Room 510 and an autopsy was conducted to identify the suspect's body, which had been burned beyond recognition. During preliminary investigations, police suspected the assailant was a tall white adult male who spoke English.

On June 3, authorities released CCTV footage of the incident. The gunman had arrived at the casino in a taxi, whose driver revealed that the gunman hailed him at San Lazaro and spoke fluent Tagalog. The driver claimed the suspect was already limping when he entered the casino, corroborated by an absence of bullet wounds in the autopsied body. Footage showed the warning shots, the gunman dousing furniture with gasoline and igniting it, the robbery, the gunfight, and the retreat to the hotel room. The footage revealed that the gunman unmasked after hiding at the base of the hotel stairwell, revealing his face as he looked directly at one of the cameras during his flight upstairs. Investigation of public CCTV footage in Manila revealed that the gunman acquired 3 liters of gasoline from a fuel station around 11:19 pm before boarding the taxi to the casino.

=== Casino management lapse ===
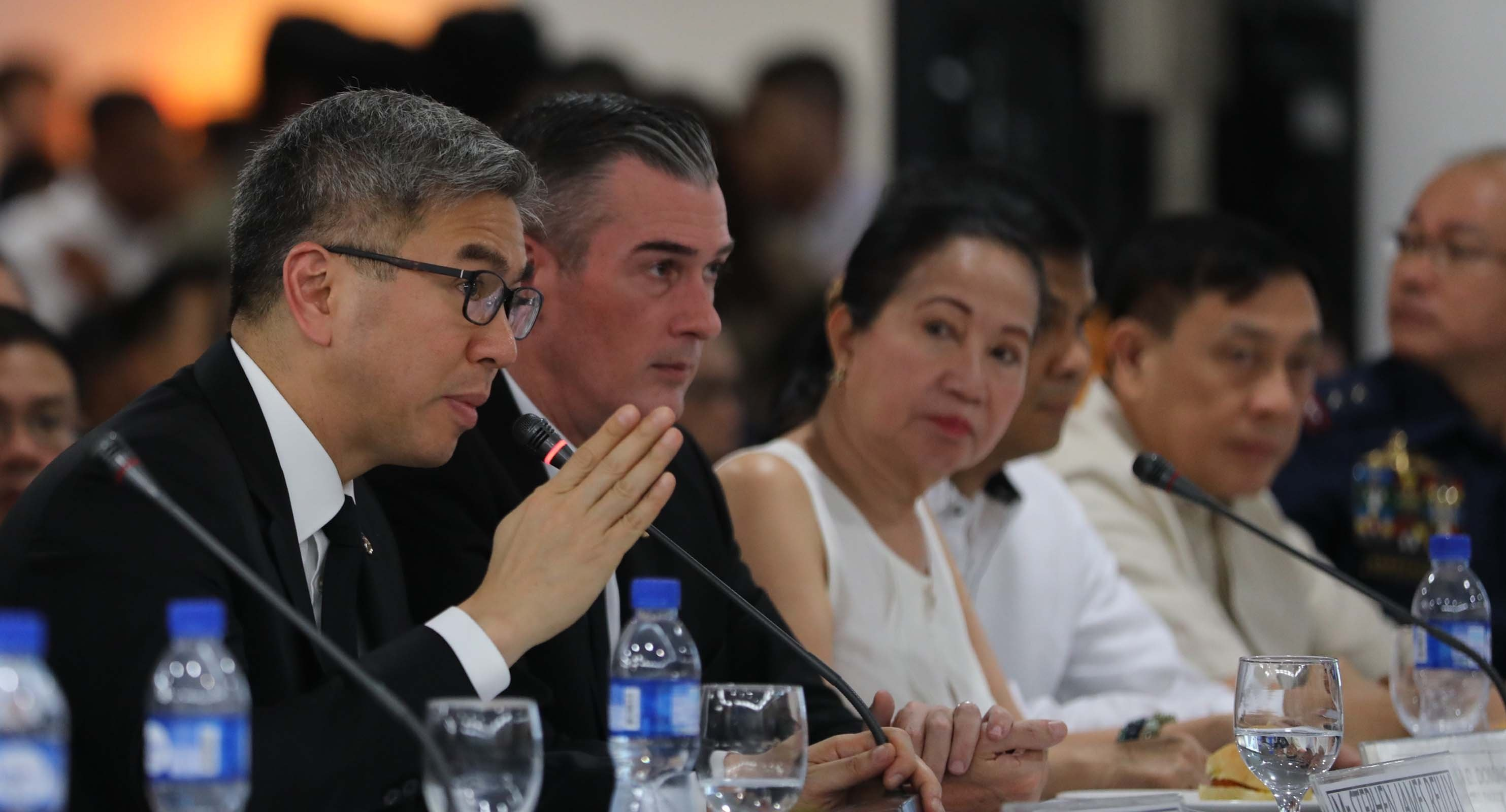
Resorts World Manila president Kingson Sian (left) is queried during the Congressional hearing

The House of Representatives' Committee on Public Order and Safety and the Committee on Games and Amusement opened a probe into the incident on June 7, 2017.

Management of Resorts World Manila admitted that there was a lapse in security in one of the house probes. The casino's CEO, Stephen Reilly, said CCTV footage showed some security personnel were not at their posts when the attacker entered the casino. Resorts World Manila President Kingson Sian said that the management had successfully evacuated thousands of people from the establishment. Sian noted that there were thirteen fire exits on the second floor of the casino, with nine in the gaming area.

Queried about why 37 people died despite the casino's efforts, Sian said that the attacker left a bag of bullets in the public area room where people suffocated to death. He said that people may have thought that there were many gunmen and decided to stay put for fear for their lives despite the fire. Sian alleged that an explosion of a BMW car on display on the second floor contributed to the panic and said that the Bureau of Fire Protection (BFP) should confirm his claim. The BFP has yet to conduct a fire safety inspection in the area.

The Philippine Amusement and Gaming Corporation, the licensor of Resorts World Manila, had issued a security advisory to its licensee casinos to provide additional precautionary measures in wake of recent terrorist incidents and the martial law declaration in Mindanao.

Resorts World Manila security chief Armeen Gomez's credentials and educational background were scrutinized by House Majority Leader Rodolfo Fariñas and Representative Romeo Acop. Gomez claimed to have ten years of experience as a security practitioner. Gomez also said that he had only "short, stint training" in the early part of his career, when asked about his police or military background. He said that he was admitted to the Philippine Military Academy (PMA) but was discharged due to "personal reasons". Acop questioned his conflicting statements regarding his attendance in the PMA and found that Gomez did not finish college. Fariñas expressed doubt about Gomez's credentials and said that the casino's personnel should have been adequately trained. Gomez had been on his way home but returned to the casino when he was informed about the attack.

=== Claims of terrorist attack ===
The attack, occurring concurrently with the Marawi crisis in Mindanao, targeted an area popular with Western and American tourists, fuelling speculation that the attack was affiliated with the Islamic State of Iraq and the Levant-aligned Abu Sayyaf and Maute group, or its sympathizers. SITE Intelligence Group reported that a Marawi-based Filipino operative linked to ISIL, which had used Telegram to report on the ground in the Marawi crisis, claimed via Telegram that "lone wolf soldiers" connected to the group were responsible. A day later, the Amaq News Agency claimed the attack was carried out by ISIL fighters, while the group's East Asia division referred to only one attacker named Abou al-Kheir al-Arkhebieli and boasted about the number of Christians killed or wounded. Following the identification of the gunman, on June 8, the same Marawi-based Telegram account further claimed that the casino gunman converted to Islam four months earlier and had informed the Marawi group of the planned attack one week before the attack. Since the June 8 Telegram post, no further information or claims from ISIL or its affiliates were publicized regarding the attack.

Since the start of the investigation, police consistently rejected claims of terrorism, stating that the attack may have been a robbery, and refuted eyewitnesses' initial speculation that the attack was linked to an ISIL-related action, which caused panic among many hotel employees and guests. In a follow-up investigation, the National Capital Region Police Office further rejected claims that multiple attackers were involved and ruled out terrorism as a motive. Steve Cutler, chairman of the Overseas Security Advisory Council and former United States FBI attaché to Manila, similarly concluded that the incident was a robbery, not an act of terrorism. The June 8 Telegram statement was similarly rejected by both intelligence officials and the Armed Forces of the Philippines in a Rappler investigation.

== Reactions ==
=== Domestic ===
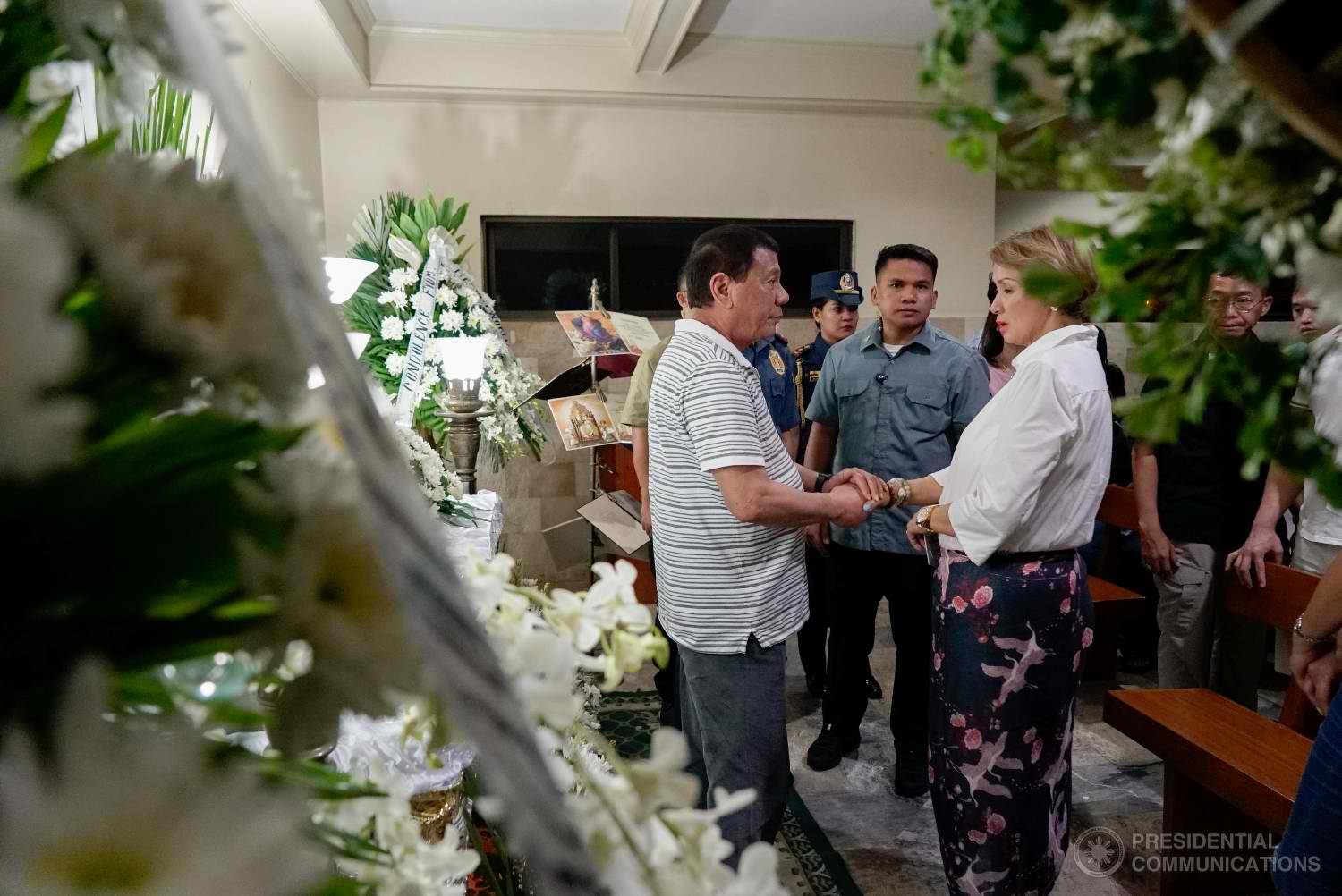
President Rodrigo Duterte condoles actress Azenith Briones, whose husband was killed in the attack, June 4, 2017

Malacañang Palace expressed condolences to the families and friends of the victims. Malacañang reiterated the importance of President Rodrigo Duterte's campaign against criminality as a centerpiece program of the administration. President Duterte called the gunman "crazy", ruling out any links to ISIL saying the group was more "brutal and cruel". While speaking to reporters in Subic Bay, Duterte apologized for the incident and questioned Resorts World Manila on the layout of their emergency exits. He also denied that the incident was terrorism-related, but warned that a terrorist incident could occur in the Philippines.

Members of the Philippine Congress expressed sadness over the attack. Muntinlupa Representative Ruffy Biazon and Senator Joel Villanueva urged the public to remain calm to avoid spreading fear and escalating the incident into an issue of national security. Magdalo Representative Gary Alejano labeled the incident as "isolated". House Speaker Pantaleon Alvarez disagreed with the conclusions of police, claiming the attack could be a "lone wolf terrorist attack"; Alvarez called on the police and the military to cooperate to ensure public safety against terrorism. Gabriela Women's Party Representative Emmi de Jesus expressed hope that the incident would not prompt an extension or expansion of martial law, which had already been declared in Mindanao following the Marawi crisis. Senators Win Gatchalian and Grace Poe urged establishments, particularly tourism facilities, to tighten security. Senator Panfilo Lacson, a former director-general of the Philippine National Police, urged the police to prevent speculation from interfering in their investigation. Senate President Aquilino Pimentel III raised questions to the management and PAGCOR regarding the security arrangements and concern for safety in casino hotels, while Senator Kiko Pangilinan also raised similar questions.

The National Economic and Development Authority assured that the fundamentals of the Philippine economy would not change due to the incident, which director-general Ernesto Pernia described as an "isolated criminal case of robbery."

Several local celebrities offered their prayers to the victims of the attack.

In response to the attack, the police have increased their presence in shopping malls in Metro Manila.

==== Manila airport closure ====
From 1:45 to 3:45 am during the attack, the main gates of the four terminals of the nearby Ninoy Aquino International Airport were shut down as a precaution. Only passengers and airport personnel already inside were able to move between terminals during the shutdown. Four Philippine Airlines flights were delayed. Operations of the airport normalized the following day, but security measures were heightened. The issuance of access passes to passengers was temporarily suspended. Cebu Pacific offered refunds or free rebooking to patrons who booked flights scheduled on June 2, 2017.

==== Responses to the gambling industry ====
PAGCOR suspended the operating license of Resorts World Manila on June 9, 2017, until it deemed that it had rectified its "serious security lapses and deficiencies" saying that the incident put the gaming, tourism, and hospitality industries of the Philippines "in a bad light". PAGCOR has also said that it will require its other casino and resort licensees to submit their security protocols as part of measures to prevent a similar incident from occurring.

On the same day, the Philippine National Police ordered the relief of security guards posted at the entrance and exits of the Resorts World Manila casino.

=== International ===
The European Union expressed sympathy to the Philippine government and the attack victims' families and friends, and for expressed hope he speedy recovery of the injured. United States President Donald Trump expressed sadness over the incident, which he labeled as a terrorist attack, and added that U.S. officials "were closely monitoring the situation." U.S. Congresswoman Madeleine Bordallo from Guam condemned the attack and offered assistance to constituents in Guam attempting to contact family members at the resort. The embassies of Australia, the United Kingdom, and the United States issued travel advisories to their citizens, informing them to avoid the area and to follow the advice of local authorities.

Travellers International Hotel Group, the operator of Resorts World Manila, condemned the attack as a "cowardly act of a deranged mind."

== Aftermath ==
The license suspension imposed by PAGCOR was lifted on June 29, 2017, and on the same day, Resorts World Manila resumed its gambling operations in gaming areas not affected by the attack.

The casino resort experienced a decline in revenue, causing management to rush "Phase 3" of the facility's development. It hired Blackpanda, a private security consultant, to tighten its security procedures. The gambling area on the second floor affected by the attack was converted to be part of the shopping mall. By September 2017, the casino had recovered most of its visitor base, accommodating 26,000 people per day on average compared to 28,000 before the attack.

== See also ==
- Terrorism in the Philippines
