= Manila Bay Casino =

Defunct casino in Manila Bay, Philippines

- Location: Manila Bay, Philippines
- Opened: 1977
- Closed: 1979
- Casino type: Floating casino
- Owner: Philippine Amusement and Gaming Corporation

The Manila Bay Casino was a casino situated off Manila Bay. Described as a "floating casino" it was hosted on the MS Philippine Tourist.

== History ==
The Manila Bay Casino was established by state-owned enterprise Philippine Amusement and Gaming Corporation (PAGCOR) during the Martial Law era under president Ferdinand Marcos. It is the first ever casino of PAGCOR.

PAGCOR entered a contract with the Philippine Casino Operators Corporation (PCOC) on July 5, 1977, for the operation of a floating casino off Manila Bay. Manila Bay Enterprises Inc. which was majority owned by Macanese firm SJM Holdings of Stanley Ho was also involved in the project.

The casino operated on all three decks of the marine vessel MS Philippine Tourist.

The ship was gutted by fire in 1979. Arson by the Light-A-Fire Movement was alleged.

== Failed revival ==
Stanley Ho proposed another floating casino during the administration of president Joseph Estrada. He acquired the Jumbo Kingdom floating restaurant from Hong Kong to towed it to the dock at Manila Bay near the Cultural Center of the Philippines Complex for the purpose of a new casino. The casino never went operational and was moored in Manila Bay.
