= Newport World Resorts =

Resort in Metro Manila, Philippines

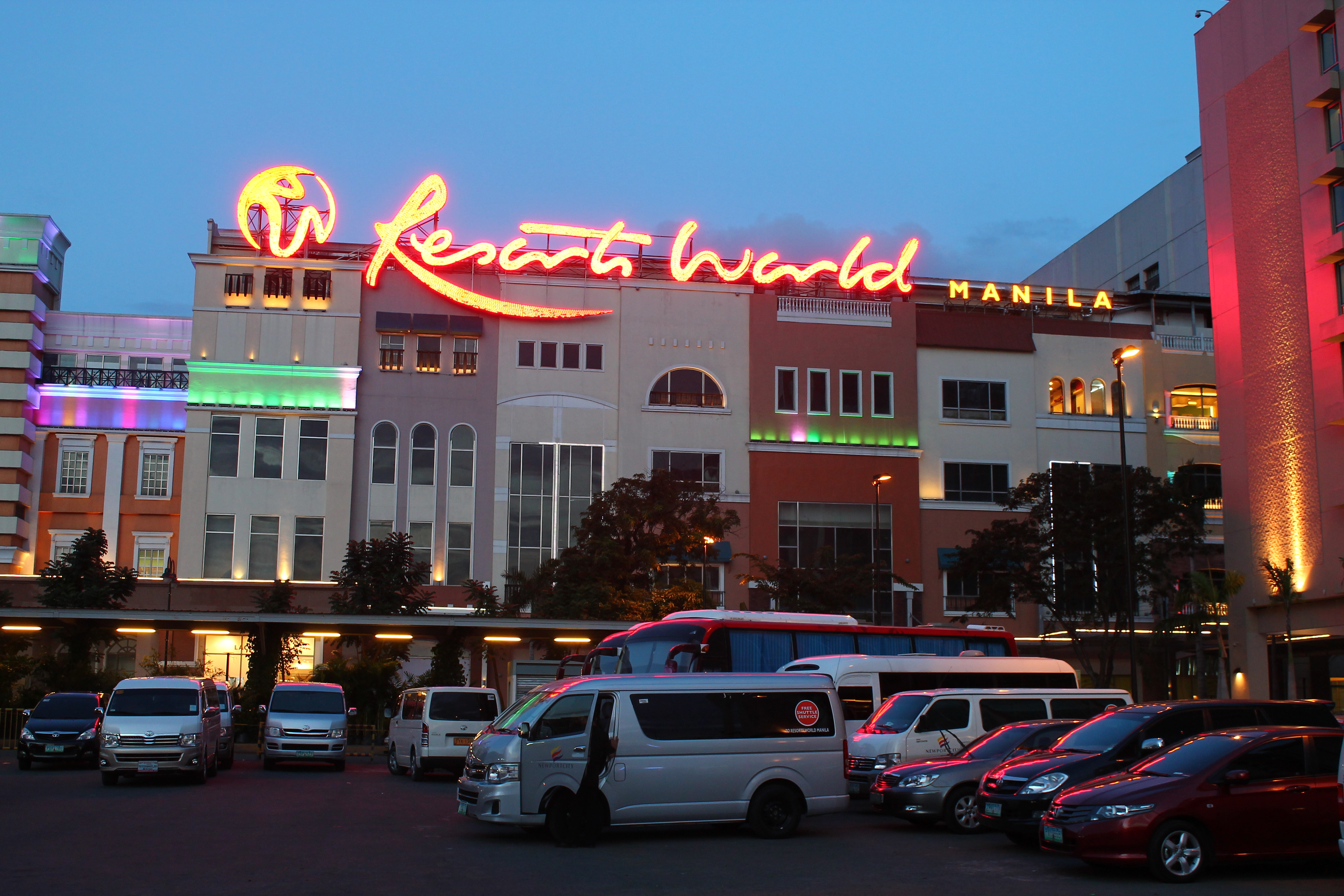
- Newport World Resorts, then as Resorts World Manila, pictured in 2012
- Interactive map of Newport World Resorts
- Location: Newport City, Pasay, Metro Manila, Philippines; 14.51881°N 121.01994°E
- Opened: August 28, 2009; 17 years ago
- No. of rooms: 1,574
- Gaming space: 323,000 sq ft (30,000 m^{2})
- Notable restaurants: Passion; Ginzadon
- Casino type: Land-based
- Owner: Alliance Global
- Previous names: Resorts World Manila
- Public transit access: Future: MMS NAIA Terminal 3
- Website: newportworldresorts.com

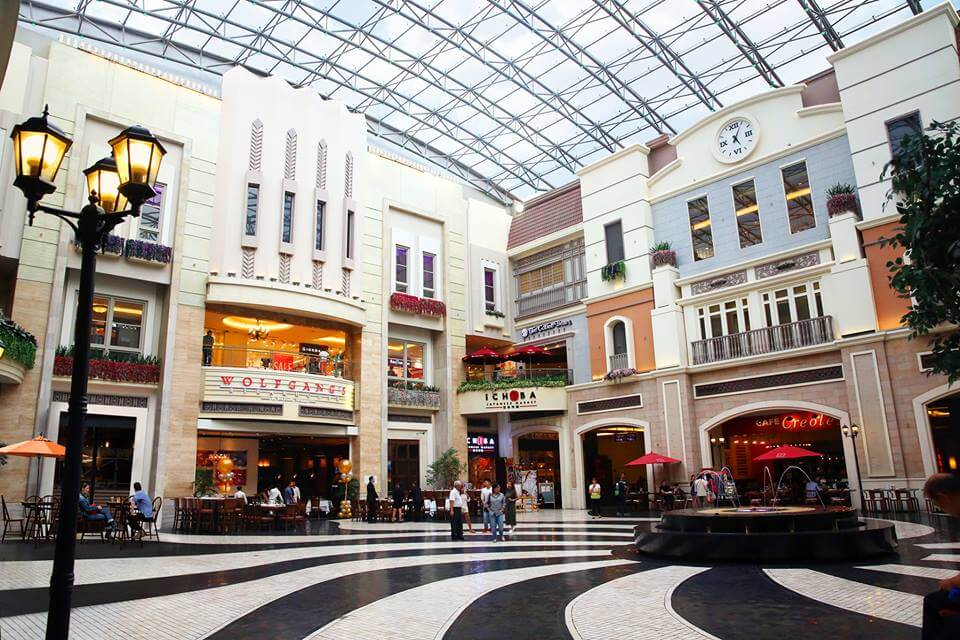
Newport Mall, the shopping mall at Newport World Resorts

Newport World Resorts (formerly Resorts World Manila) is an integrated resort, located in Newport City, opposite Ninoy Aquino International Airport (NAIA) Terminal 3, in Pasay, Metro Manila, Philippines. The resort is owned and operated by Travellers International Hotel Group, Inc. (TIHGI), a joint venture between Alliance Global Group and Genting Hong Kong. The project, occupying part of a former military camp, has four hotels, casino gambling areas, a shopping mall, cinemas, restaurants, clubs and a theater.

== History ==
A soft launch of the resort took place on August 28, 2009. Resorts World Manila was a sister resort to Resorts World Genting in Malaysia and Resorts World Sentosa in Singapore. It was the first integrated resort in Metro Manila, and from 2009 to 2013 it was the only one in operation until the opening of Solaire Resort & Casino in Entertainment City, Parañaque, on March 16, 2013.

On June 2, 2017, dozens of people died after a robbery caused a stampede and the perpetrator set a fire, leaving 38 people dead and 54 wounded. The casino temporarily suspended its operation and had its license suspended by PAGCOR on June 9, 2017. The license suspension was lifted on June 29, 2017, and on the same day Resorts World Manila resumed its gambling operations in gaming areas not affected by the attack.

Alliance Global rebranded Resorts World Manila into "Newport World Resorts" on July 20, 2022. Genting Hong Kong then sold its stake to AGI on May 30 the next year. Genting Hong Kong previously had declared bankruptcy for its cruise business due to the COVID-19 pandemic.

On June 1, 2024, Alliance Global announced the appointment of Kevin Andrew Tan, as president and chief operations officer of AGI, replacing Kingson Sian. AGI, also confirmed NWR's CEO Kingson Sian's retirement after serving for 16 years. Hakan Dagtas and Bernard Tan also resigned as chief operating officer and chief financial officer, respectively. Nilo Thaddeus Rodriguez was appointed president and CEO, while Lance Gautreaux, as chief operating officer.

== Hotels ==
Five hotels operate within the integrated resort. Hilton, Sheraton, and Okura are located at the adjacent Grand Wing connected by a bridge from the second level of Newport Mall.

Property Name	Operator	Opened in	Notes
Hilton Hotel Manila	Hilton Hotels & Resorts	October 2018	
Holiday Inn Express Hotel Manila	InterContinental Hotels Group	November 2011	Formerly Remington Hotel, rebranded as Holiday Inn Express Manila in June 2018.
Marriott Hotel Manila	Marriott Hotels & Resorts	October 2009	
Okura Hotel Manila	Okura Nikko Hotel Management	April 2022	
Sheraton Hotel Manila	Sheraton Hotels and Resorts	January 2019	

== Theater ==
The Newport Performing Arts Theater is a 1,500-seat venue for concerts, plays, musicals, conferences and other events. It was designed by Hong Kong–based interior designer Joseph Sy, assisted by Lon Samala as associate architect under Casas Architects. The theater's vestibule also serves as a venue for various types of functions.

== Meetings, incentives, conferences and exhibitions ==
Newport World Resorts formally opened in July 2015 the Marriott Grand Ballroom. Touted as the largest hotel ballroom in the Philippines, its main feature is a 3,000 m^{2} (32,000 sq ft) pillarless ballroom that can seat up to 2,500 people for a banquet event, and up to 4,500 for a concert setup. The main ballroom can be subdivided into four sections for smaller events, but there are other venues within the facility for a total of 28 spaces for various events.

== Casino ==
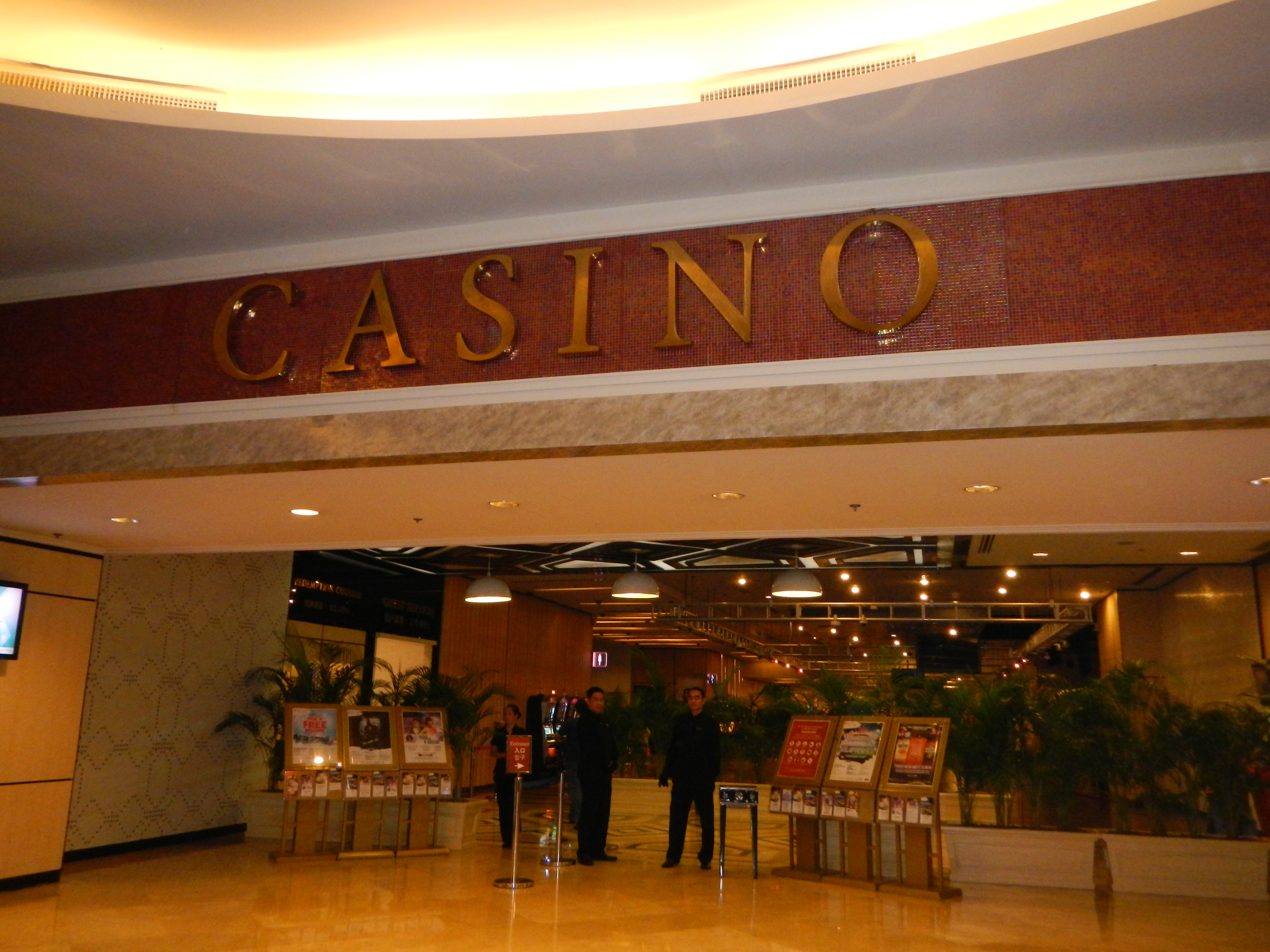
Casino at Newport World Resorts

Newport World Resorts has gambling areas occupying three floors in its main casino, featuring table games, slot machines and electronic table games. More gambling spaces are available at the Remington Entertainment Center inside Remington Hotel.

The Newport Grand Wing gaming area, opened late 2018, features more gaming space and serves as a podium of Sheraton, Hilton and Okura hotels along with more retail and dining spaces.

== 2017 attack ==
On June 2, 2017, at midnight, 36 people died from suffocation with 70 others injured after a gunman set fire to gambling tables and slot machine chairs inside the Resorts World Manila casino. The gunman, later identified as Jessie Carlos, was found dead in the Maxims Hotel adjacent to the casino.

== See also ==
- Entertainment City
- Gambling in Metro Manila
- List of integrated resorts
