= Bingo in the Philippines =

The game of bingo in the Philippines was introduced and spread by Christian missionaries and churches. Bingo were often played in perias (singular: peria) held during fiestas held in the barrios. In modern-day Philippines, bingo is usually used for charity purposes and as a fundraising tool by religious organizations and other groups. The first nationwide e-linked bingo game using "hi-tech communication equipment and videoconferencing technology" was sponsored by the Philippine Amusement and Gaming Corporation on June 12, 2013, from the World Trade Center in Pasay, known as "Shower of Millions Bingo" (the total cash prize was P12.4 million). The game was being played while participants were at different branches of the Casino Filipino. The ticket for 10 bingo games cost P3,000. A popular televised bingo game program in the Philippines is the Pinoy Bingo Night.
