= PhilWeb =

Philippine internet gaming company

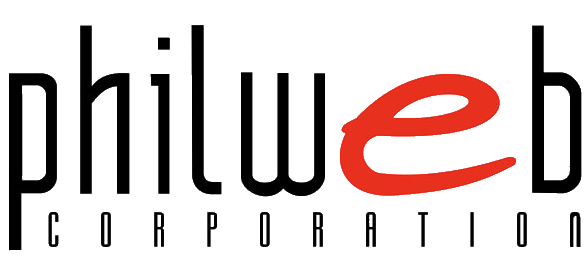
- Type: Public (PSE: WEB)
- Industry: Casino
- Founder: Roberto Ongpin
- Headquarters: 41st floor, One San Miguel Avenue, 1 San Miguel Avenue corner Shaw Boulevard, Ortigas Center, Pasig, Metro Manila, Philippines
- Area served: Asia-Pacific
- Key people: Gregorio Maria Araneta III (Chairman)
- Number of employees: 5,000 (2016)
- Website: www.philweb.com.ph

The PhilWeb Corporation is a Philippine internet company involved in the gambling industry. It has operated the e-Games casino outlets.

PhilWeb was founded by Roberto Ongpin and incorporated on August 20, 1969, as South Seas Oil and Mineral Exploration Co. Inc. It was initially involved in mining and resource exploration. The name of the company changed to South Seas Natural Resources through an authorization by stockholders on March 29, 1984, a move approved by the Security Exchange Commission.

South Seas Natural Resources' name was changed to PhilWeb.Com, Inc. on January 18, 2000, becoming an internet company. On the same date the mining claims and assets of the company was transferred to its subsidiary, All-Acacia Resources, Inc. Its name was then again changed on May 31, 2002, to its present name, PhilWeb Corporation by the company's stockholders.

In 2019, PhilWeb signed a ₱292-million share purchase and cooperation agreement with Palmary Corporation to jointly develop their electronic bingo businesses.

In 2020, PhilWeb announced that Brian K. Ng will replace Dennis O. Valdes as president of the company effective February 1.
