= Philippine Amusement and Gaming Corporation =

State-owned gambling regulator and operator in the Philippines

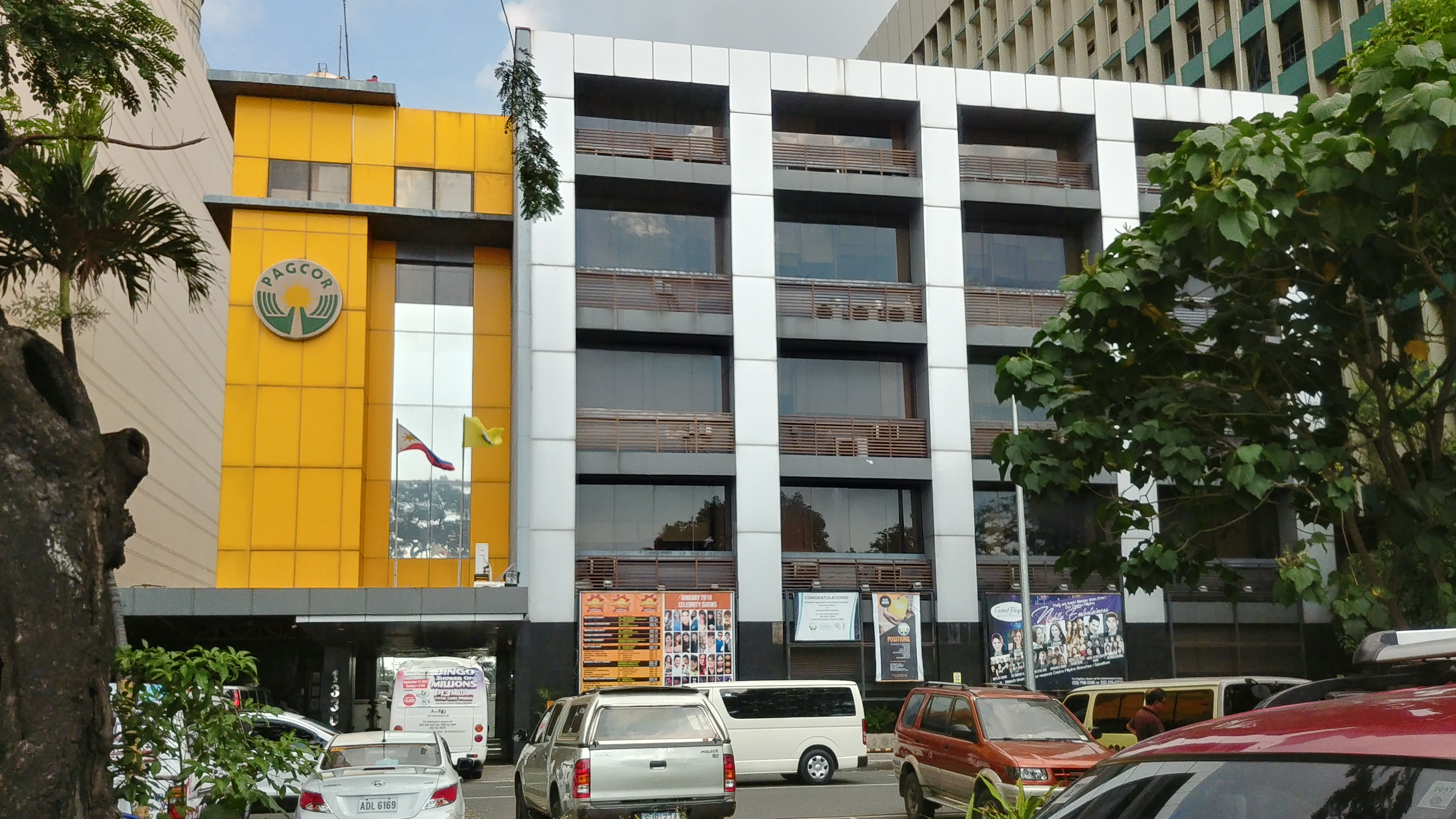
- PAGCOR old main office in Ermita, Manila
- Type: State-owned
- Industry: Casino
- Founded: January 1, 1977; 49 years ago
- Headquarters: IMET BPO Tower, Roxas Boulevard, Metropolitan Park, Central Business Park 1-A, Pasay, Metro Manila
- Key people: Alejandro Tengco (Chairman and CEO); Wilma Eisma (President and COO)
- Revenue: ▲ ₱285.27 billion GGR (2023)
- Number of employees: 11,000+
- Website: www.pagcor.ph

Philippine Amusement and Gaming Corporation (PAGCOR; Filipino: Korporasyon sa Libangan at Palaro ng Pilipinas) is a Philippine government-owned and controlled corporation serving as the country's gaming industry regulator, as well as owner and operator of a network of casino branches in key cities under the brand name Casino Filipino.

Excluded from PAGCOR's mandate, however, are the operation of lotteries by Philippine Charity Sweepstakes Office (PCSO) and the regulation of horse betting by Games and Amusements Board (GAB).

PAGCOR was established in 1977 through Presidential Decree No. 1869. It is the Philippines' third largest contributor of government revenue, after the Bureau of Internal Revenue and the Bureau of Customs. The corporation is under the Office of the President of the Philippines.

== History ==
The corporation was created during the Martial Law regime of President Ferdinand Marcos, Sr via Presidential Decree No. 1067-A issued January 1, 1977. This was in response to calls for the government to stop the growing proliferation of illegal casino operations in various parts of the country.

The first casino by PAGCOR was the Manila Bay Casino opened in 1977. It was a floating casino which operated on the ship MS Philippine Tourist and was gutted by fire in 1979.

PAGCOR shifted its focus to land-based casinos and entered into another contract with PCOC for the management of a casino at the Provident International and Resources Corporation (PIRC) building in Parañaque, Metro Manila.

Presidential Decree No. 1869 issued in 1983 mandated PAGCOR to act as the government corporation conducting and establishing gaming pools and casinos nationwide. In 1986, it was re-established and reorganized by President Corazon Aquino as a new PAGCOR to help raise funds for the government; Norberto Quisumbing was appointed as its first Chairman, followed by the former Development Bank of the Philippines Chair Alicia L. Reyes as its Chair and CEO. Reyes was succeeded by Ephraim Genuino under President Gloria Macapagal Arroyo in 2001.

In June 2007, Republic Act No. 9487 gave PAGCOR another 25 years to regulate and operate games of chance, to issue licenses, and to enter into joint venture, management, or investment agreements with private entities for Entertainment City in the Manila Bay area, Parañaque, and in Newport City, Pasay, in particular. Chairman Genuino successfully attracted investors to the project to put up Las Vegas-style integrated resorts. Two integrated resorts opened on November 1, 2014.

In 2016, during the administration of President Rodrigo Duterte, PAGCOR began regulating offshore gambling hubs in the form of Philippine Offshore Gaming Operators (POGOs), although these hubs have already been operating discreetly since 2003.

PAGCOR announced that it will launch a global-facing online casino in early 2024 under its Casino Filipino brand.

In August 2024, Supreme Court Justice Marvic Leonen granted Yeng Guiao's 2016 mandamus nullifying the Ramos-era PAGCOR memorandum. It directed PAGCOR to remit 5% of its gross income per year to PSC from 1993. In December 2025, the high court affirmed the decision.

== Branding ==
Former logo used from 1983 until 2023

The current logo of PAGCOR was adopted on July 11, 2023, in commemoration of its 40th anniversary. According to Chairman and CEO Alejandro Tengco:

[The] logo incorporates the element of fire associated with energy, inspiration, passion, and transformation. It symbolizes the flame that ignites change and drives progress. The logo likewise reflects a beacon which symbolizes guidance, leadership, and direction. It represents a guiding light that helps people find their way. All these taken together, [it] reflects PAGCOR's long standing commitment of being a guiding force that illuminates the way forward, drives transformation and development, and brings inspiration and motivation to the lives it touches.

The logo generated criticism and debate on social media platforms, with some comparing it to the logo of the unrelated Petron Corporation. The rebranding and fallout did not affect PAGCOR operations, as it posted record high earnings of ₱410 billion in 2024.

== Operations ==
PAGCOR operates its own casinos and several VIP slot clubs in major cities across the country. It also oversees and regulates privately owned casinos, more than 180 bingo parlors, as well as e-games cafes across the country. The company employs more than 11,000 workers.

=== Casino Filipino ===
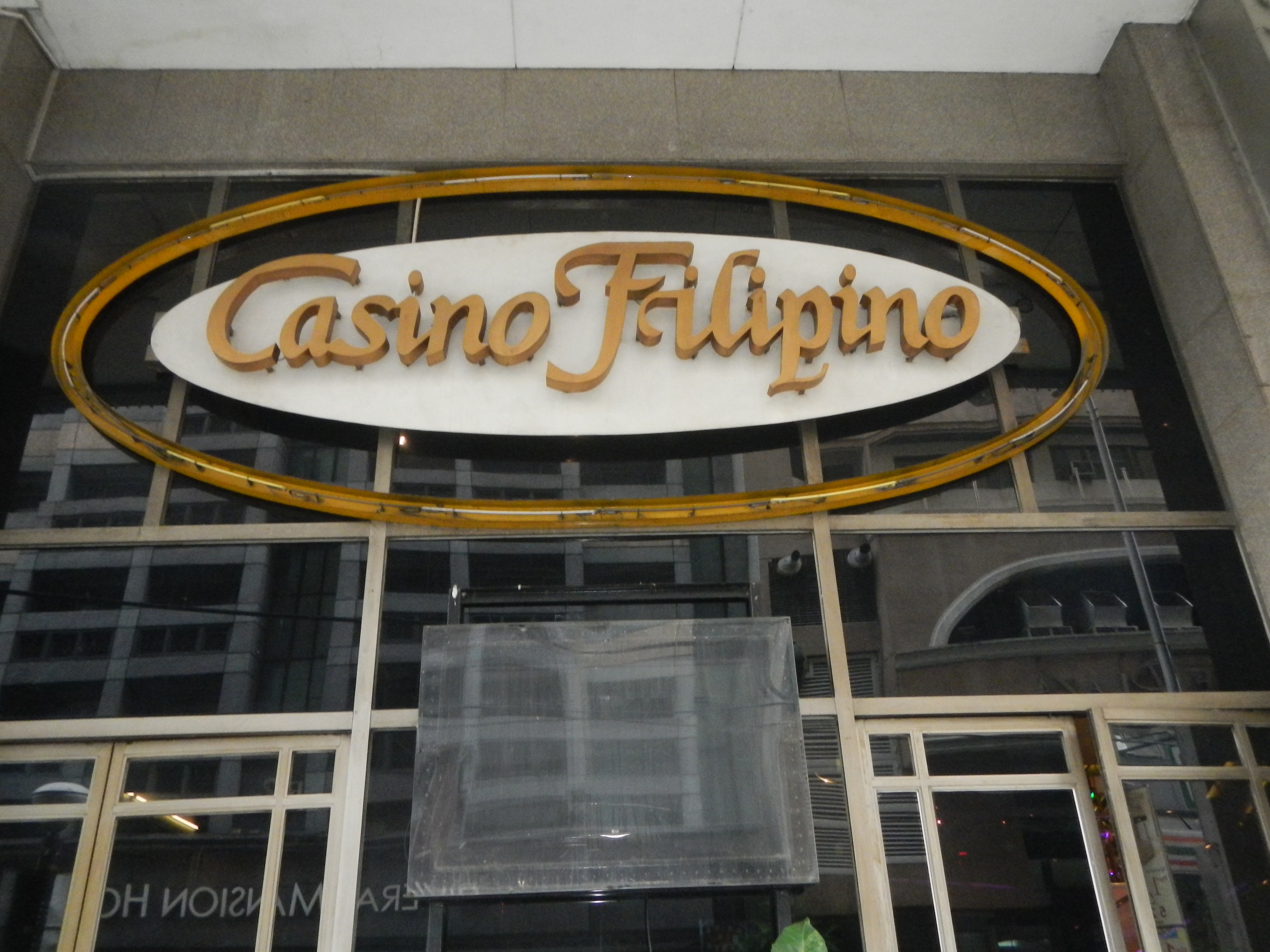
Casino Filipino in Malate, Manila

Casino Filipino (CF) is a casino chain operated by PAGCOR.

Casino Filipino has two main branches in the Manila districts of Malate and Santa Cruz. It also has major branches in Angeles City, Bacolod, Cebu City, Davao City, San Nicolas in Ilocos Norte, Iloilo City, Olongapo, and Tagaytay. PAGCOR also maintains satellite casinos under the Casino Filipino brand.

The Airport Casino Filipino in Parañaque was a former major branch which closed in 2014.

=== Philippine Offshore Gaming Operators ===
In 2016, President Rodrigo Duterte started the Philippine Offshore Gaming Operators (POGO) program under PAGCOR to allow online gambling in major cities. PAGCOR issued licenses to be used for service providers to offer online gambling. Most of the companies which obtained POGO licenses were Mainland Chinese, and their businesses primarily catered to the ethnic Chinese community at-large.

On July 22, 2024, after President Bongbong Marcos officially banned all POGOs in the country, PAGCOR was subsequently instructed to cease all POGO operations by the end of the year.

== Relations to the government ==
PAGCOR is classed as a government-owned and controlled corporation (GOCC). As of 2024, PAGCOR is the most profitable state-owned enterprise in the Philippines. It is the third largest contributor to government revenues, following taxes and customs.

== List of chairpersons ==
- Norberto B. Quisumbing (1986)
- Alicia L. Reyes (1987 – 2001)
- Hildegarde A. Palacios (June – July 2001)
- Efraim C. Genuino (2001 – 2010)
- Cristino L. Naguiat Jr. (July 1, 2010 – June 30, 2016)
- Andrea D. Domingo (July 1, 2016 – August 23, 2022)
- Alejandro H. Tengco (August 23, 2022 – present)

== See also ==
- Gambling in the Philippines
- Games and Amusements Board
- Philippine Charity Sweepstakes Office
