= Newport City, Metro Manila =

Central business district in National Capital Region, Philippines

Newport City
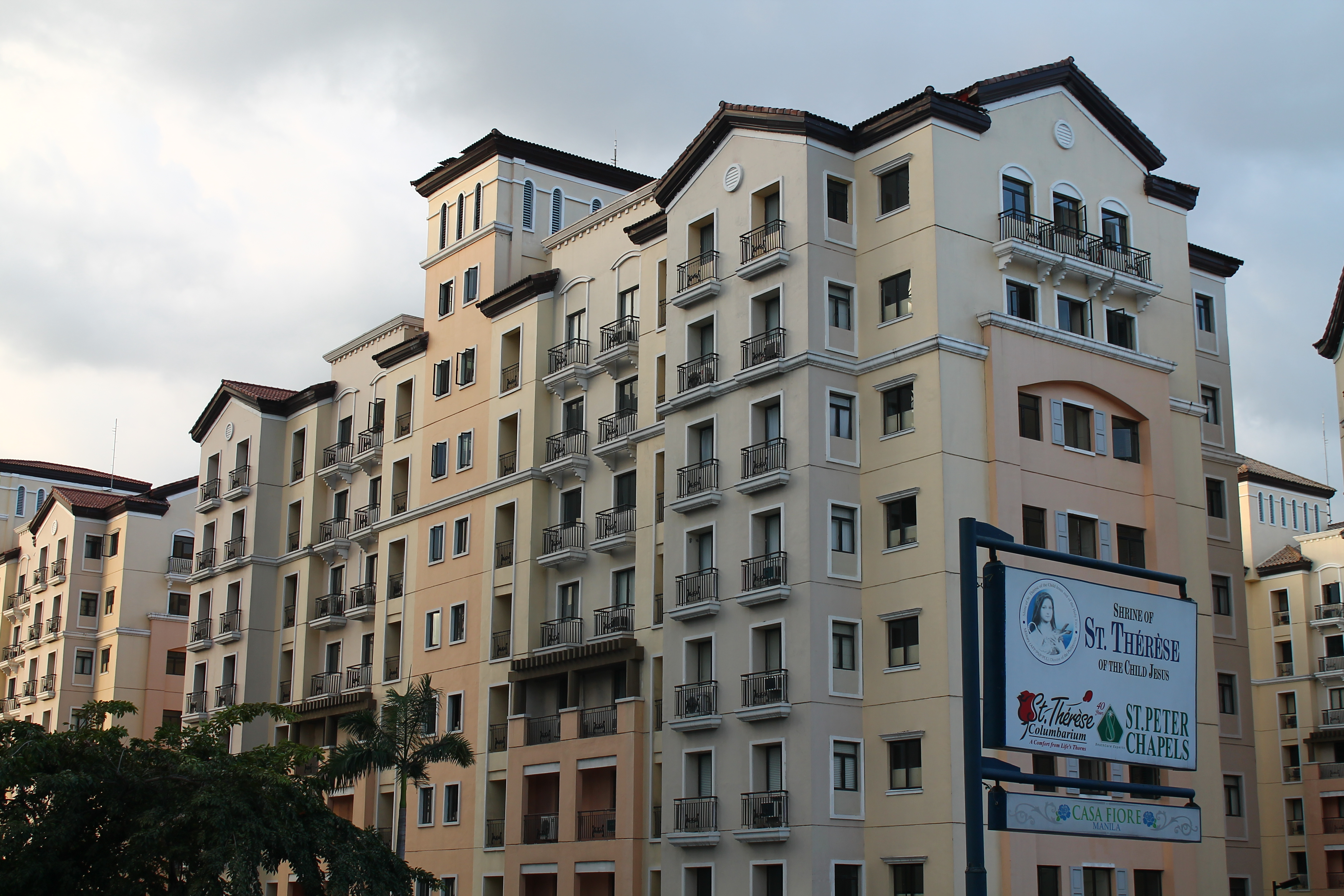
- Casa Fiore residential complex in Newport City

Project
- Opening date: 2009; 17 years ago
- Developer: Megaworld Corporation
- Owner: Megaworld Corporation
- Website: www.newportcity.com.ph

Physical features
- Major buildings: Newport Mall
- Streets: Newport Blvd

Location
- Location in Metro Manila Location in Luzon Location in the Philippines
- Coordinates: 14°31′18″N 121°00′58″E
- Location: Villamor Air Base, Pasay, Metro Manila, Philippines

Newport City is a 25-hectare (62-acre) township development situated next to the Villamor golf course and Terminal 3 of Ninoy Aquino International Airport (NAIA) in Metro Manila, Philippines. Awarded as the Mixed-Use Development of the Year by the Philippine Retailers Association in 2015, Newport City is a Megaworld Corporation township development and is designed to combine accommodations and entertainment with residences, hotels, a mall and Resorts World Manila, the country's first fully integrated entertainment complex.

== Newport Mall ==
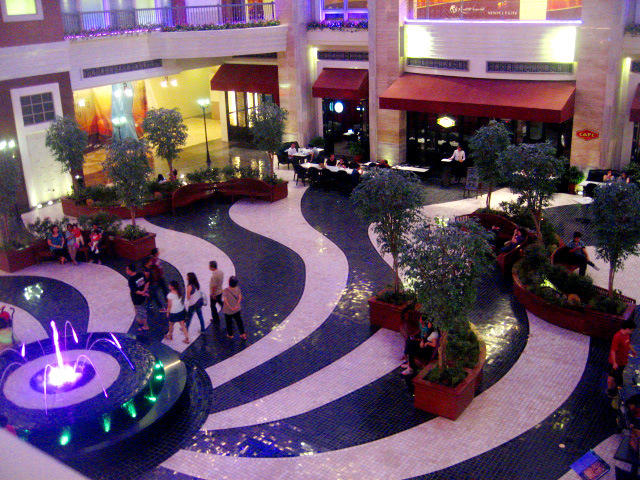
Newport Mall atrium

Newport Mall is a lifestyle mall development of Megaworld Lifestyle Malls located inside Newport World Resorts complex.

It also specializes in restaurants. For entertainment, Newport Mall offers 24-hour weekend movie screening at its four cinemas.

== Newport Performing Arts Theater ==
Newport Mall is home to the Newport Performing Arts Theater (NPAT). The 1,500-seater NPAT has hosted productions like KAOS, The Sound of Music, The King and I, Cinderella, Priscilla, Chitty Chitty Bang Bang, Ang Huling El Bimbo and the TV singing competition The Voice of the Philippines.

== Gallery ==
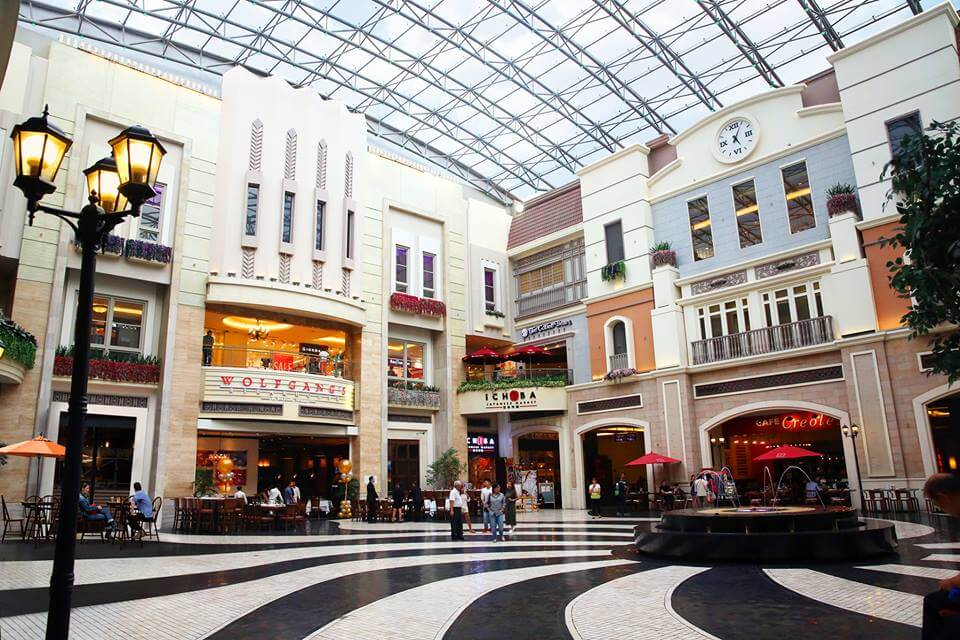
Newport Mall

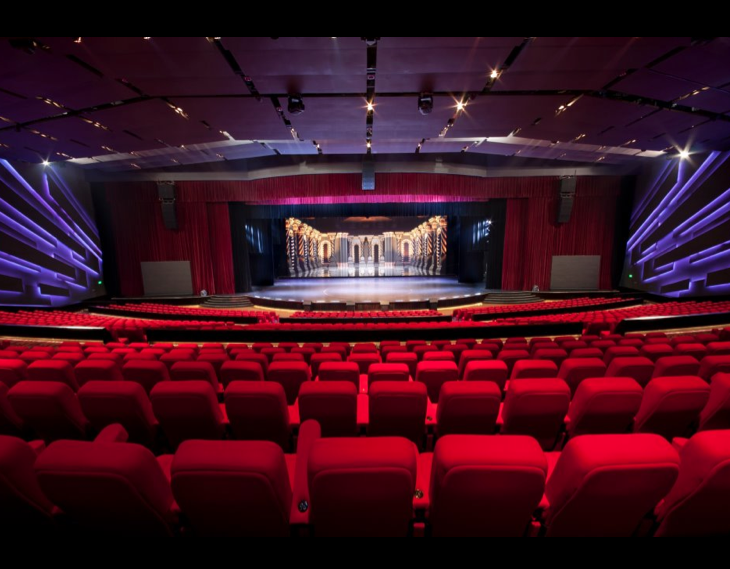
Newport Performing Arts Theater

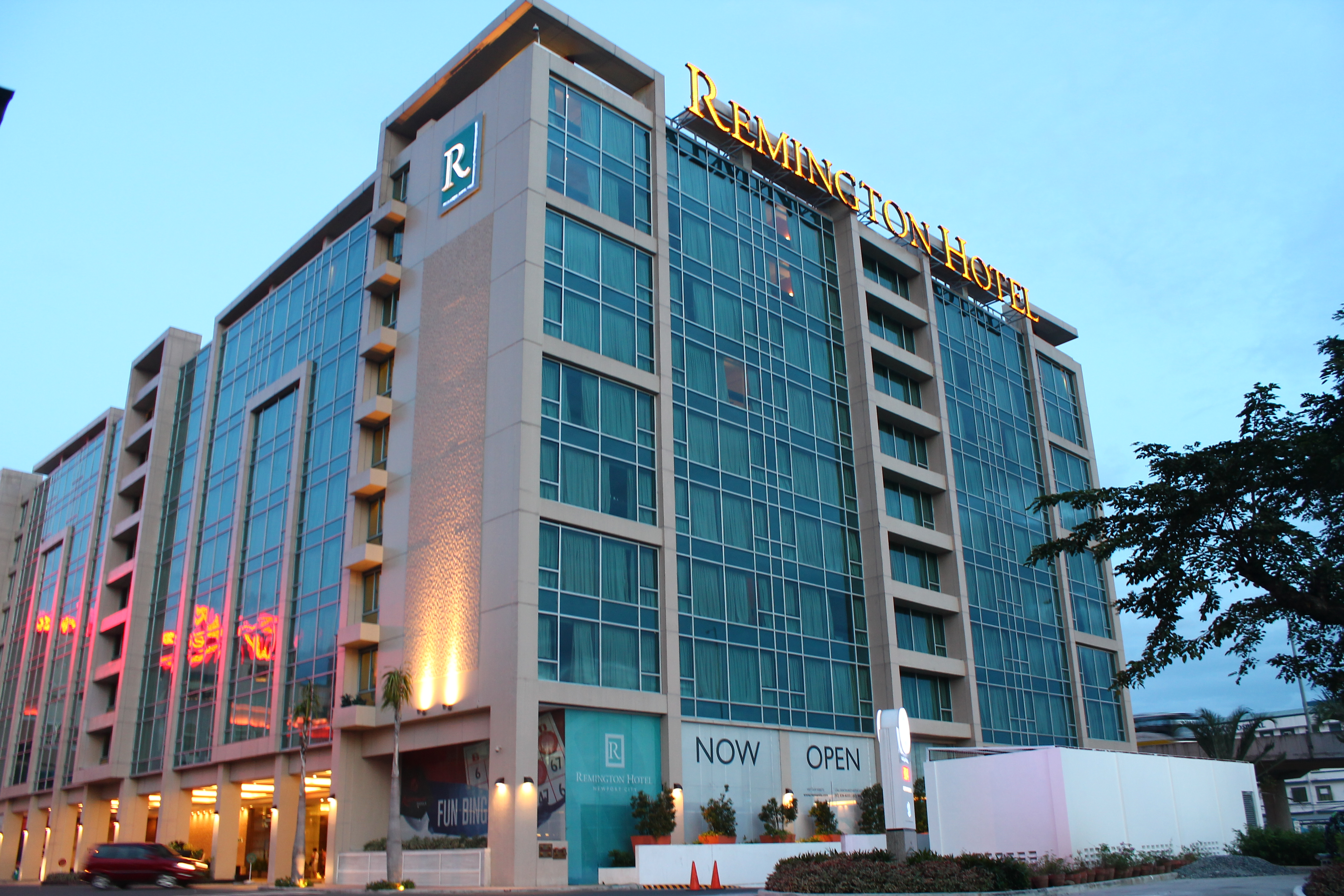
Remington Hotel (now Holiday Inn Express Manila Newport City)

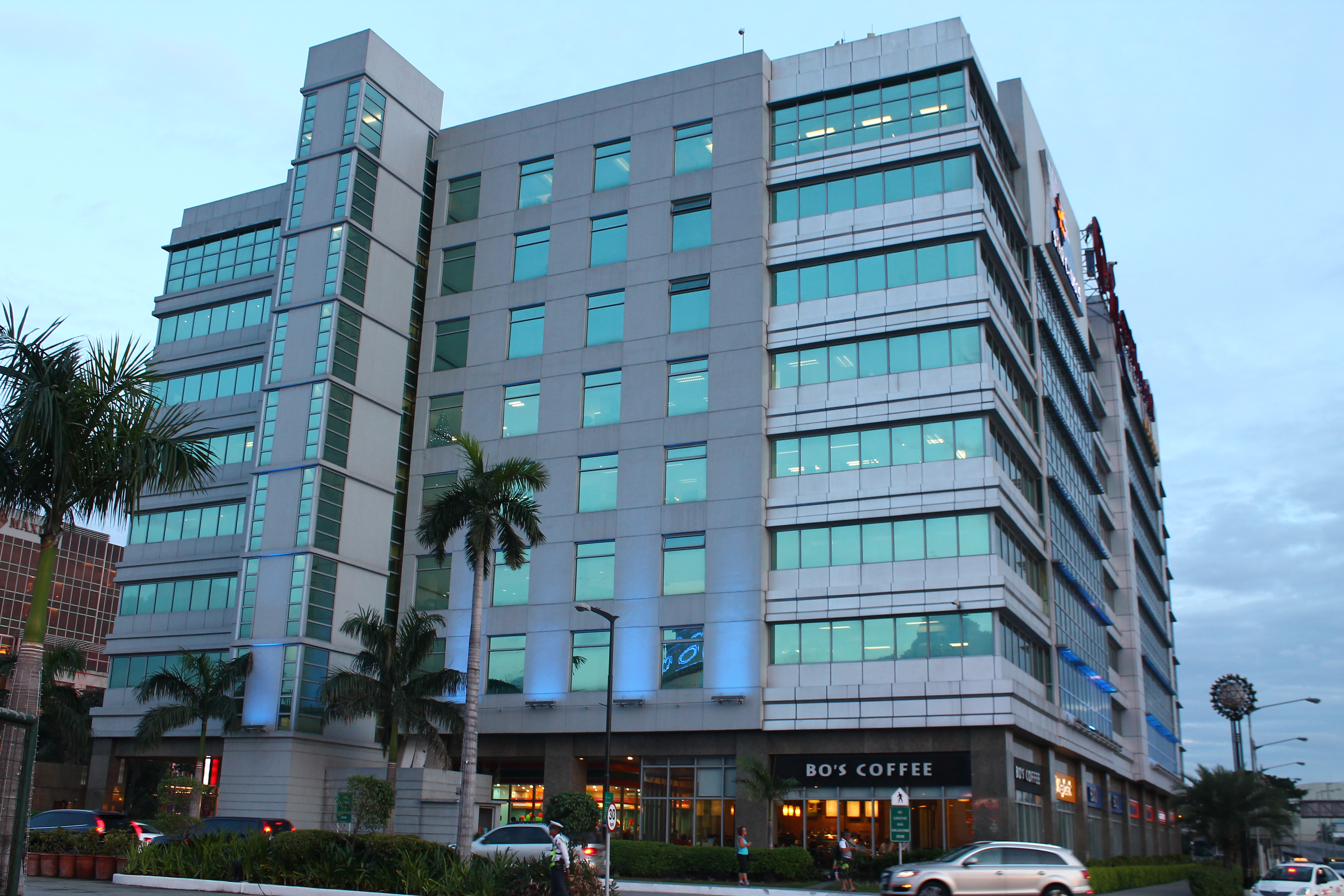
Star Cruises Centre

== See also ==
- Newport World Resorts
- Villamor Airbase
