= SM Mall of Asia =

Shopping mall in Pasay, Philippines

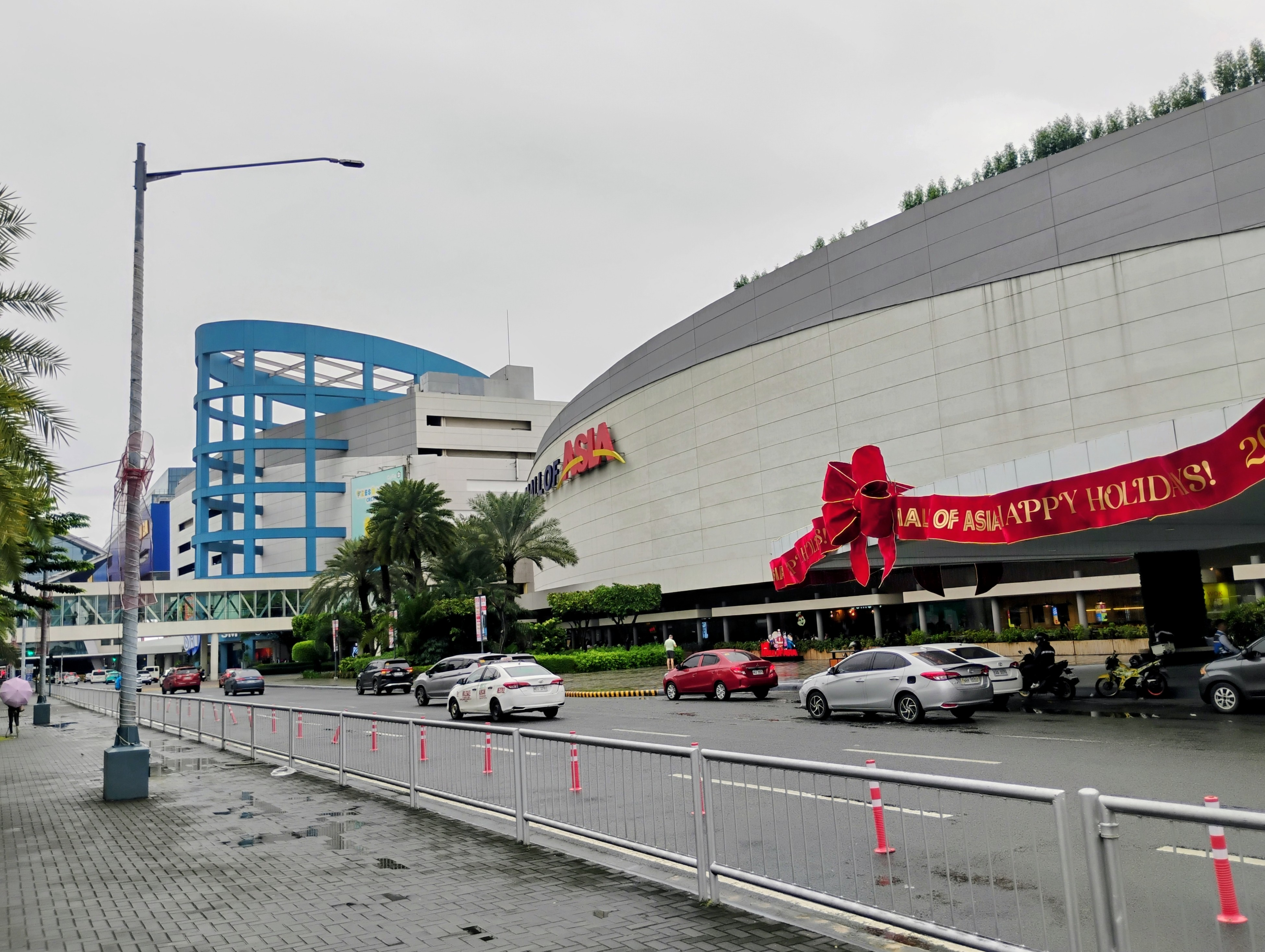
- The exterior facade of the main mall and south parking buildings of the SM Mall of Asia in 2025
- Location: Pasay, Metro Manila, Philippines
- Coordinates: 14°32′06″N 120°58′55″E
- Address: Seaside Boulevard, Barangay 76, Central Business Park I-A, Bay City, EDSA corner J.W. Diokno Boulevard
- Opened: May 21, 2006; 20 years ago
- Developer: SM Prime
- Manager: SM Prime
- Architect: Arquitectonica
- Num. of stores: 663 shops, including 217 dining establishments
- Num. of anchor tenants: 16
- Floor area: 497,000 m^{2} (5,350,000 sq ft) (mall proper (Note: SM Prime in its list of gross floor area (GFA) of its assets on its September 2025 report, it lists the SM Mall of Asia as having a GFA of 497,000 square metres (5,350,000 sq ft). It lists the 157,000 m^{2} (1,690,000 sq ft) SM MOA Square separately. The MOA Square, which includes IKEA Pasay City as its tenant, is also described as an expanded wing of the Mall of Asia.))
- Floors: Main Mall buildings: 2 (2006-2015 until expansion), 4 (including expansion); SM Store: 3; MOA Square: 8; Carpark buildings: 8
- Parking: 8,000 slots
- Public transit: 1 SM Mall of Asia SM Mall of Asia: 4 5 6 7 14 30 34 52
- Website: SM Mall of Asia

SM Mall of Asia, also abbreviated as SM MoA, or simply Mall of Asia or MoA ([ˈmoː.ɐ]), is a shopping mall in Bay City, Pasay, Philippines. It is located within the Central Business Park I-A, a reclaimed area along Manila Bay, at the southern terminus of EDSA. This mall averages 300,000 daily visitors. The mall is owned and developed by SM Prime. Mall of Asia is the largest shopping mall in the Philippines, the second-largest in Southeast Asia after IOI City Mall in Malaysia, the sixth-largest in the world, and the fourth and newest SM Supermall to be built along EDSA after SM Makati, SM North EDSA and SM Megamall. It currently occupies 16 hectares (40 acres) of land area and a gross floor area of approximately 497,000 m^{2} (5,350,000 sq ft), and offers 46,647 m^{2} (502,100 sq ft) of floor area space for conventions and social functions.

== History ==
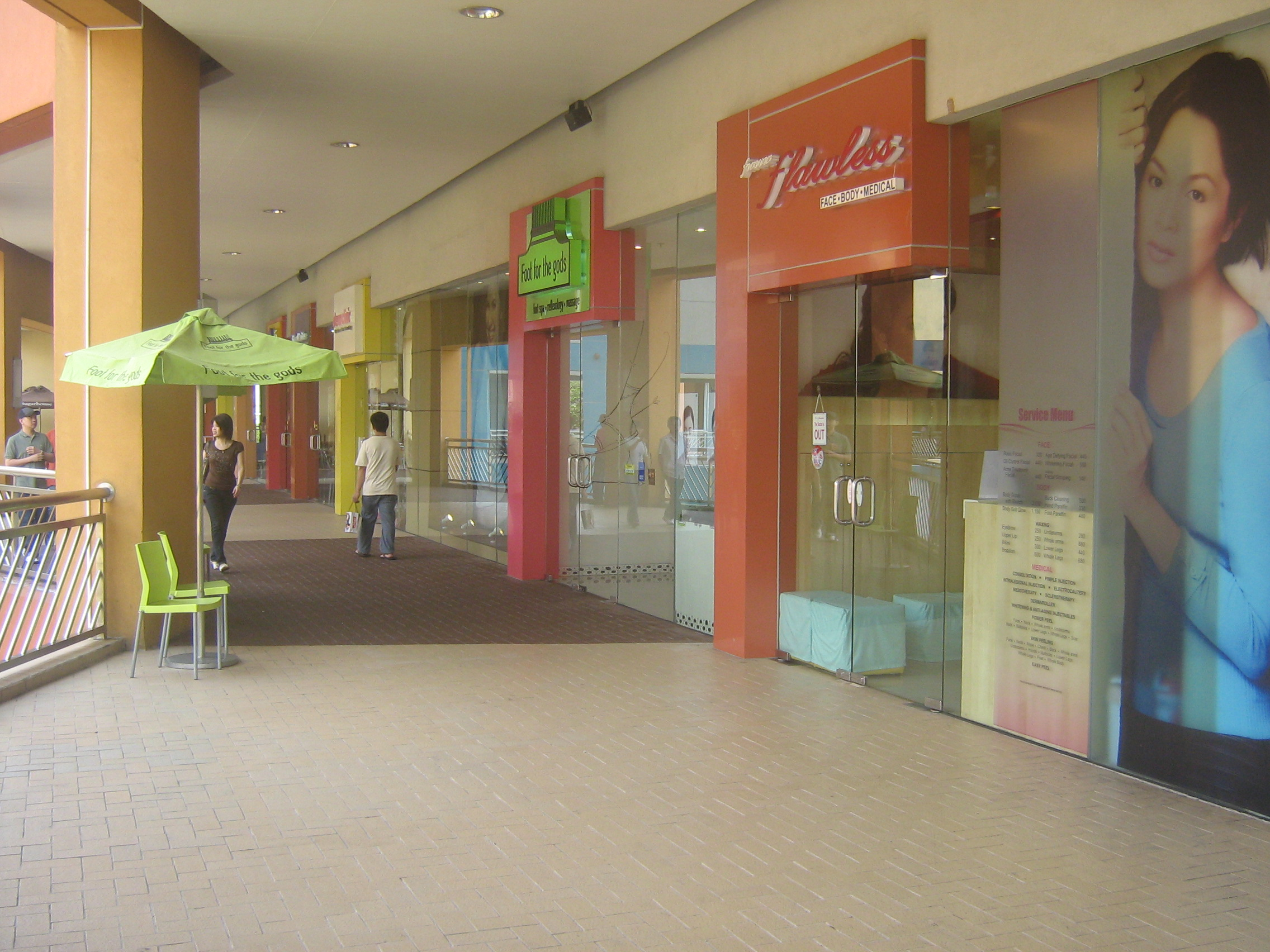
SM Mall of Asia during its earlier years, October 2007

Plans for SM Mall of Asia began as early in 1995. Construction of the shopping mall was slated to began in January 1996, with construction originally slated to begin in January 1996; it was marketed to become the largest shopping mall in the world upon completion. However, the project was delayed and reduced in scale amid the country's weak economy. Eventually, construction of the Mall of Asia began in 2002.

The planned inauguration on March 3, 2006 was postponed after a team of Pasay city engineers found huge cracks underneath the structure, which was causing the structure to vibrate. However, the Pasay engineering department denied ever making statements that the mall structure had structural defects.

Logo from 2022 to 2023

SM Prime moved the opening to May 21, 2006, to give more time for tenant stores to move in. The mall opened as scheduled, with President Gloria Macapagal Arroyo was in attendance during the inauguration ceremony. SM reported one million of pedestrian traffic on opening day. Initial facilities include the Philippines' first IMAX cinema, an ice skating rink, and the outdoor steel-framed globe.

== Layout ==
Panoramic view of SM Mall of Asia (2009)

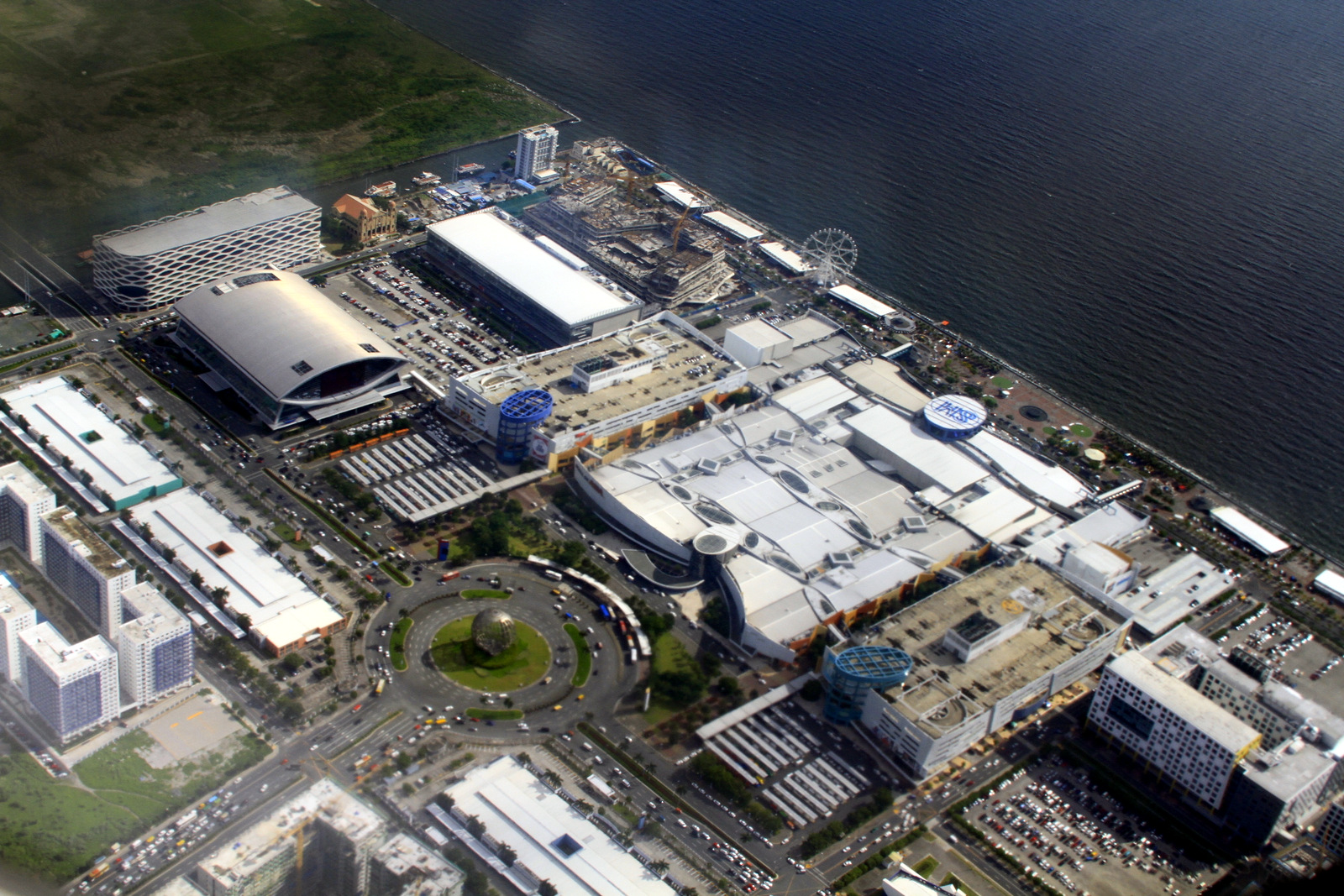
Aerial view of SM Mall of Asia (2014)

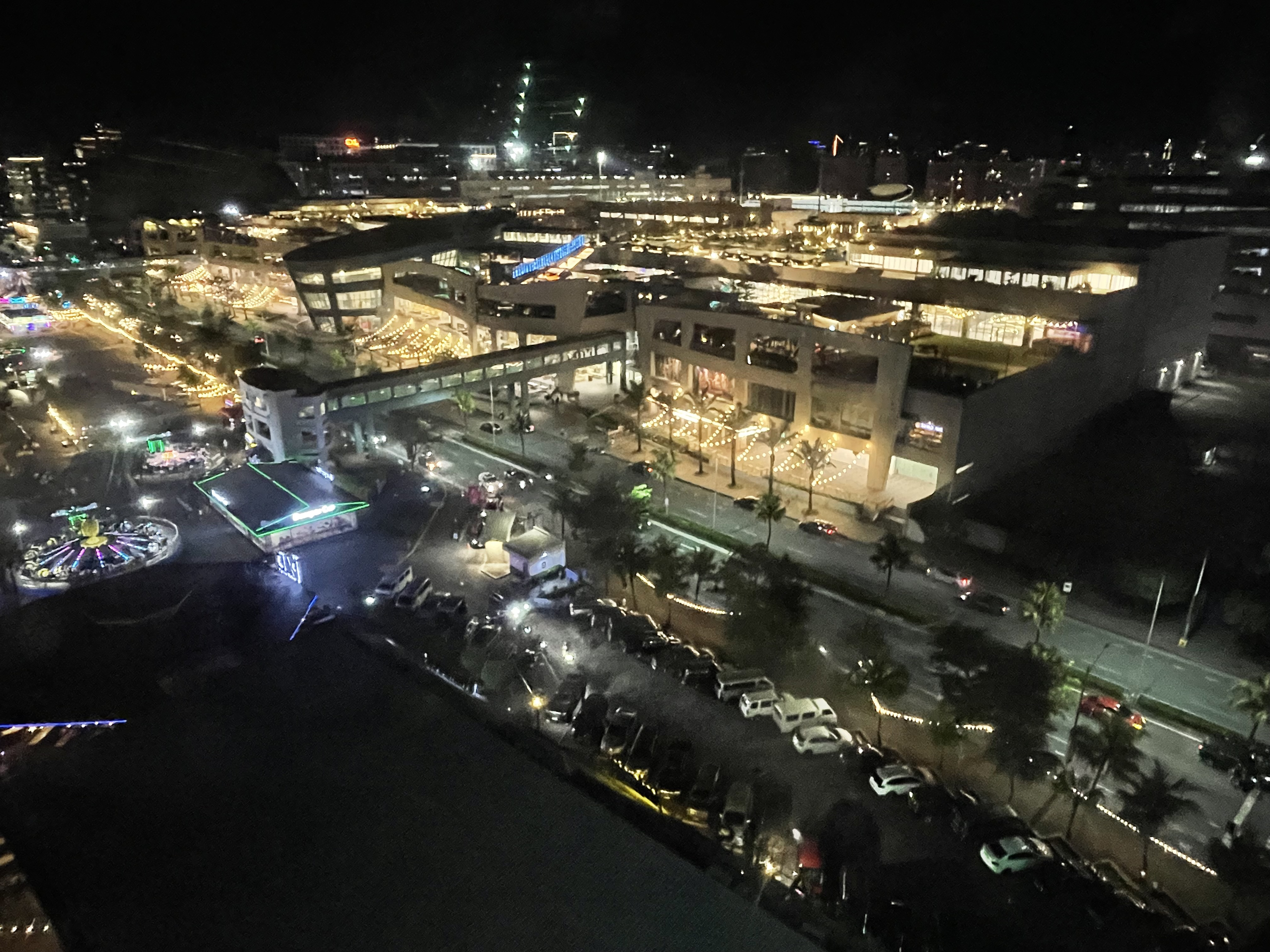
Upper view of SM Mall of Asia facing Manila Bay at night (2026)

The Mall of Asia consists of four buildings interconnected by walkways and elevated pathways: the Main Mall, the Entertainment Mall, and the North and South Wing Parking Buildings.

The Main Mall includes numerous shopping and dining establishments and the food court. The Entertainment Mall is a two-story complex, most of which is open-air, and also features some shopping and dining businesses. The Entertainment Mall also hosts the Music Hall, an events hall (formerly open-air, now airconditioned) facing Manila Bay. As of late 2021, majority of the area has been renovated with addition of air-conditioning. Due to the mall's size, all buildings have concierge desks, assisting local information within the area.

The mall's 5,000 parking spaces are divided across two, six-story parking buildings conveniently designated the North and South Parking Buildings, which have been covered with a solar rooftop. The South Parking Building houses the mall's official The SM Store, while the mall's supermarket, the SM Hypermarket, is located at the North Parking Building. Since 2016, these parking buildings are equipped with elevators and escalators, which allow fast access to parking levels.

Since its opening in 2006, visitors to the mall have been welcomed by large steel framed globe on a roundabout at the southern end of Epifanio de los Santos Avenue (EDSA), known as the MoA Globe. In 2009, the globe was turned into Globamaze, an LED display.

== Features ==
The Globe from a distance

The mall includes branches of all of the standard anchor stores found in most of the SM Supermalls. The first-ever branch of Taste Asia, one of the SM Supermalls' food court brands, is located right outside the mall's supermarket, the sprawling SM Hypermarket. The first-ever branch of the Disney Store in Southeast Asia opened in September 2024 at the complex's North Main Mall.

The mall's open-air Music Hall directly facing Manila Bay has also held numerous events, contests, and concerts since the mall's opening in 2006.

The mall also provides office space. Dell International Services, a subsidiary of Dell, Inc. once occupied a 13,470 m^{2} (145,000 sq ft) area at the second floor of the North Parking Building of the mall. Eventually, in 2015, Teleperformance took over that space until 2019, as the company moved its operations to the MoA Annex Building. Currently, the site has been replaced by the mall anchor Cyberzone for IT-related shops, one of the biggest Cyberzones in the country since the opening of SM North EDSA.

=== MoA Food Hall ===
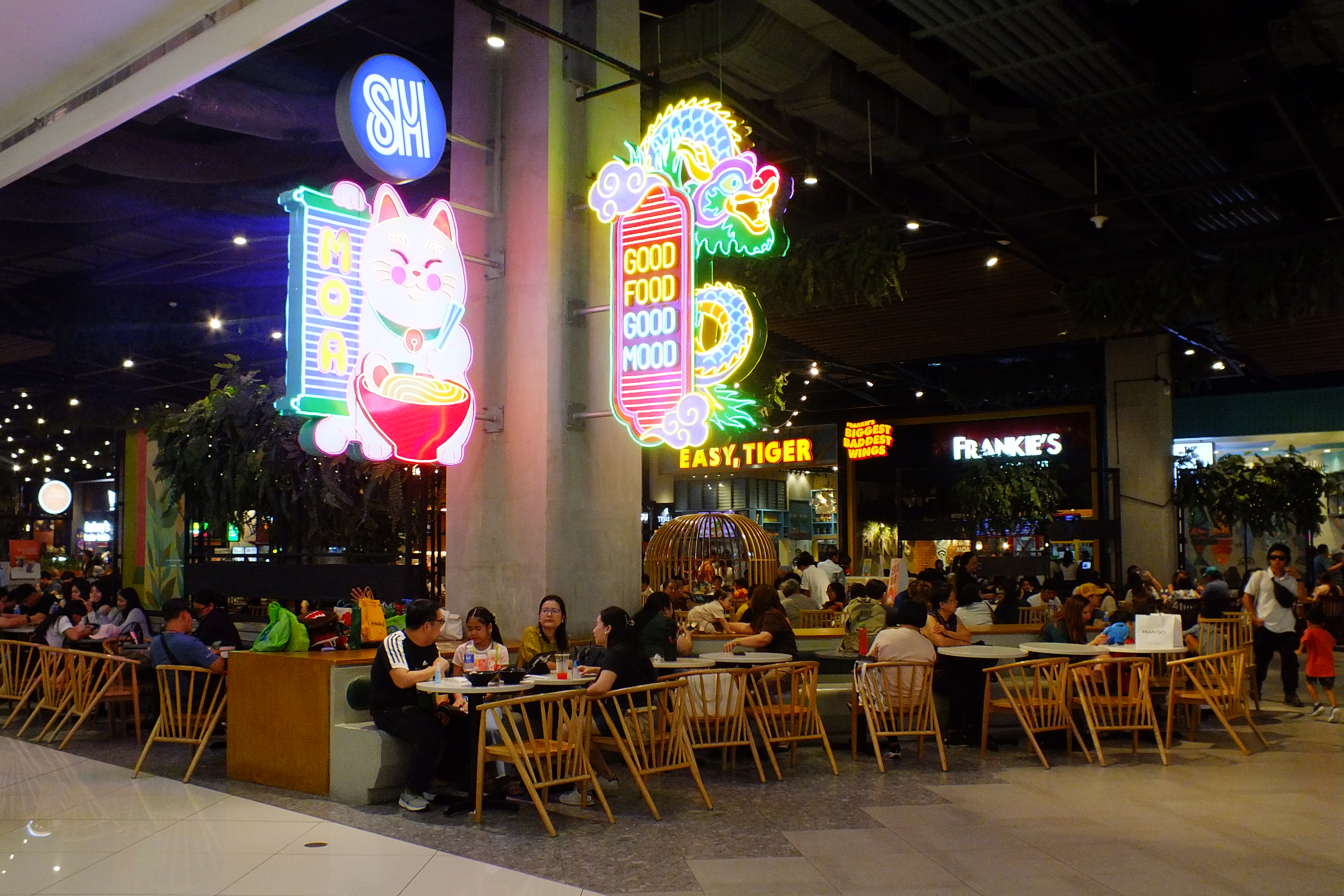
MoA Food Hall

Opened on February 12, 2020, the new Food Hall is located in the 3rd Level, across SM Skating Rink at the main mall. Replacing the former SM Food Court at the second floor, it features budget to upscale dining choices.

=== SM Game Park ===
A replacement of the SM Bowling Center at the ground level of the North Entertainment Mall, the flagship branch of SM Game Park is located on a 1,947-square-meter (20,960 sq ft) space at the 3rd Level of the South Entertainment Mall. It was opened in November 2023, after delays. It features bowling, billiards, basketball, archery, a game room, a mini-arcade, KTV, and a sports bar.

=== SM Skating Rink ===
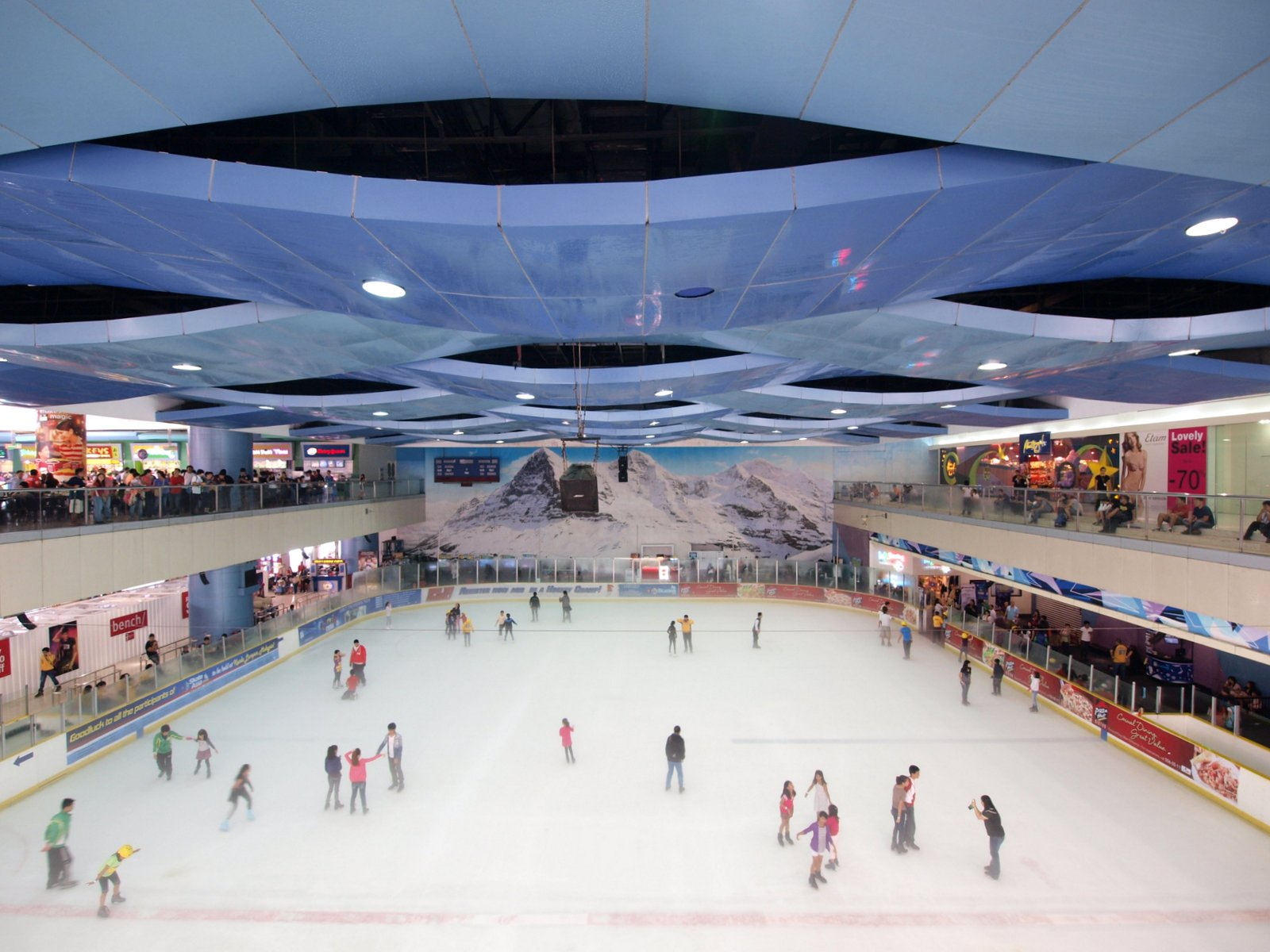
The former ice skating rink on the ground floor of the main mall, photographed in 2012

The mall features the Philippines' first Olympic-sized ice skating rink on the third level of the mall's main building. It covers an area of 1,800 square meters (19,000 sq ft) and has a spectators area which can seat up to 200 people and accommodate up to 300 people.

An older ice skating rink was one of the main features of the SM Mall of Asia at the time of its inauguration in 2006, which was initially situated at the ground level of the mall's main building. During the mall's renovation works, the skating rink was temporarily moved from 2015–2017 to the open area lot now occupied by MOA Square. The current skating rink, located at the 3rd floor of the mall's main building, was opened in 2017.

Several ice skating competitions have been held at the mall's ice skating rink such as the Skate Asia 2007, the first time an international competition at that scale was held in the Philippines. The ice hockey competition of the 2019 Southeast Asian Games was also held at the skating rink.

=== MOA Sky ===
The MOA Sky refers to the shopping mall's rooftop amenities above the Main Mall and Entertainment Mall. Originally known as the Sky Garden, it first opened in September 2023. On February 25, 2025, it was re-inaugurated as the MOA Sky with new facilities including the MOA Football Pitch, MOA Paw Park, MOA Sanctuary, and MOA Sky Amphitheater. During the inauguration, an intra-squad exhibition game between players of the Philippines women's national football team took place.

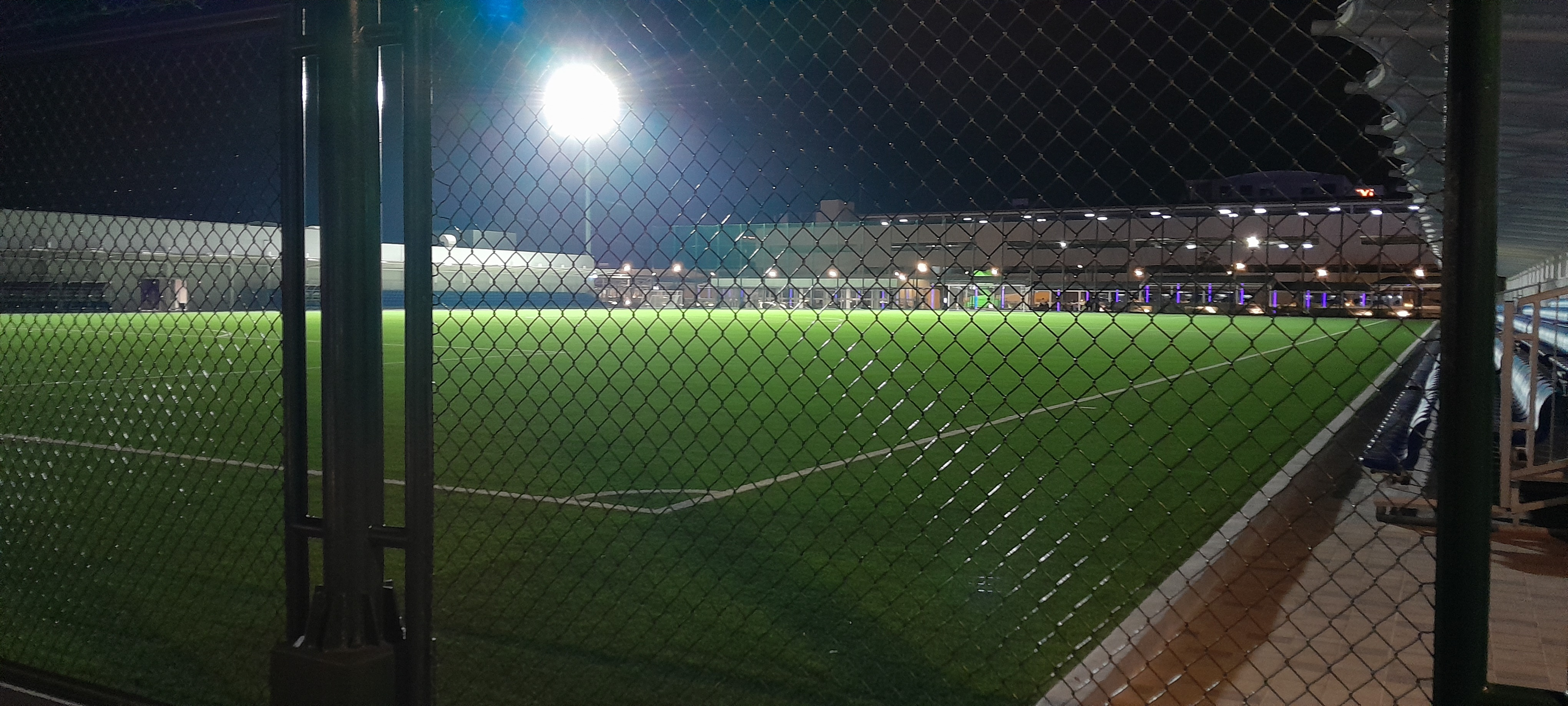
The Adidas Football Park

The MOA Football Pitch (known as the Adidas Football Park) is a 115-by-74-meter (377 ft × 243 ft) FIFA-grade artificial field with bleachers on the west and east side with a total of 1,800 seats. The MOA Paw Park is a dedicated area designed as a haven for dogs, featuring play zones and venue for pet parties. The MOA Sanctuary features a huge rosary, indoor glass structure, and secluded pocket gardens as places of prayer and meditation. The MOA Sky Amphitheater serves as an open-air performance venue. Also included are two plazas (North Sky Plaza and South Sky Plaza), 4-meter-tall (13 ft) Zodiac sculptures by Filipino-American visual artist Jefrë, playgrounds, al fresco dining, a grand staircase, viewing decks, and a solar photovoltaic rooftop.

=== SM Cinema ===
The mall features a total of 14 cinemas with 8 regular cinemas, three Director's Club Cinemas, one Event Cinema, one ScreenX Cinema, and one IMAX Theater. It originally featured a total of 10 cinemas, with six regular cinemas, Director's Club Cinema for intimate screenings (30 La-Z-Boy seats), Premier Cinema, CenterStage, and an IMAX theater.

==== IMAX ====
One of the mall's main attractions is the first ever and the largest IMAX theater in the Philippines. Originally with the naming rights of San Miguel-Coca-Cola, IMAX Theatre is one of the world's biggest IMAX screens in 3D including 2D screenings. It was originally a traditional film projector that uses its 15/70 mm film format, IMAX GT (Grand Theatre). The IMAX Theater was closed on October 11, 2013, for digital conversion, and re-opened on October 30, 2013, along with the release of Thor: The Dark World. On November 6, 2014, the old traditional 70mm IMAX projector was used for Christopher Nolan's Interstellar. In July 2017, the main lobby was temporarily closed for renovation (where the XD Cinema is going to be demolished), and its lobby was temporarily moved at the second floor in front of Cinemas 7 and 8, the main lobby re-opened on December 11, 2018, upon the launch of Event Cinema and the Asian premiere screening of Aquaman where its star Jason Momoa has arrived in the country; however, its temporary lobby is closed being used as offices for cinema personnel and as an emergency fire exit. On August 18, 2019, the IMAX Theater was closed for renovation and re-opened on October 29, 2019, with updated interiors and high-end spectator seats with comfortable Paragon 918 chairs from world-class spectator seats manufacturer Ferco Seating. The IMAX re-opened on May 4, 2022, along with the release of Doctor Strange in the Multiverse of Madness.

As part of SM Cinema's expanded partnership with IMAX Corporation, which will bring IMAX with Laser upgrades to existing IMAX locations, the IMAX was closed in September 2024 for an IMAX with Laser upgrade and reopened on November 20, 2024, along with the release of Wicked and equipped with a 12-channel sound system.

==== Expansion and redevelopment ====
Additional cinemas were opened in the mall since 2016. Two digital theaters, Cinemas 7 and 8, were opened at the north side of the entertainment mall in December 2016. The Event Cinema was opened on December 12, 2018, and located at the newly renovated IMAX theater lobby, which can be used for birthday parties, corporate events, and seminars, and it can house up to 45 people.

Half of the original cinema area, including Cinemas 4 to 6, Director's Club and Premier Cinema, was closed on August 22, 2018, after the celebration of the 2nd Pista ng Pelikulang Pilipino and were demolished for renovation as part of the mall expansion. The new Cinemas 1 to 5 softly re-opened in December 2019 along with the limited-early release of Star Wars: The Rise of Skywalker, while the other remaining cinemas, the three Director's Club Cinemas equipped with Dolby Atmos and laser projector were re-opened on its grand re-launch on January 22, 2020, at the former space of Premier Cinema. Cinemas 9 to 11, which are formerly Cinemas 1 to 3, remained in temporary operations after the re-opening of the renovated theaters. The former space of the Director's Club Cinema is now occupied by Surplus Shop.

The Cinemas 6 to 8 opened on December 22, 2024, replacing the former Cinemas 1 to 3 and 9 to 11. The former Cinemas 7 and 8 at the North Wing remained vacant after its permanent closure.

The mall also hosts a ScreenX cinema, located at the former Centerstage. Announced in a press release on August 31, 2025, the cinema opened on November 19, 2025, along with the release of Wicked: For Good.

== Former features ==
=== The Exploreum ===
The Exploreum was a science and technology museum located at the Entertainment Mall. A ₱313 million joint venture between SM Prime Holdings and United-States-based Leisure Entertainment Consultancy (LEC), it opened in 2007 as the SM Science Discovery Center. It featured a digital planetarium and a wide range of technology and science-themed exhibits. At the time of its opening, the two-level science center covered an area of 3,200 square meters (34,000 sq ft). It also featured the Digistar Planetarium housed within a 16-meter-tall (52 ft) dome which was designed by Evans & Sutherland.

In 2009, it was renamed into Nido Fortified Science Discovery Center as SM Prime Holdings partnered with Nido Fortified, a milk brand of Nestlé.

In 2014, Nido Fortified Science Discovery Center was rebranded to The Exploreum, which featured 118 new interactive exhibits and over 100 non-interactive exhibits in eight major interactive galleries namely the Natural World, Human Adventure, Zoom, Connect, Cyberville, Space Camp, the Living Earth, and Science Park.

Exploreum was closed in 2017 as a part of the mall expansion.

=== XD Cinema ===
The XD Cinema is a 4D theater located at the IMAX lobby at the ground floor. It opened on November 25, 2014 and is equipped with 48 pneumatic controlled seats that are intended to highlight the immersive nature of the theater, it has in-theatre effects including snow, wind, water, scent, fog, and strobe/lightings. It also has leg tickler, motion seats, seat vibrators, and seat impactors to add a fourth dimension experience. The first local film to be shown in this theater was Feng Shui 2.

The XD Cinema was permanently closed in April 2017 for ongoing renovation works of the IMAX lobby, with no plans for its return.

=== Premier Cinema ===
The Premier Cinema was closed on August 22, 2018, for renovation works and is currently occupied by three Director's Club Cinemas.

=== Centerstage ===
Centerstage was a cinema located at the second floor of the North Entertainment Mall combined with traditional theater features. It was designed to accommodate a range of events, including live musical concerts and theatrical performances. On March 14, 2020, it was permanently closed due to the COVID-19 pandemic. However, it was reused once on March 12, 2022, for the BTS: Permission to Dance On Stage - Seoul: Live Viewing. Currently, the cinema's space hosts the ScreenX theater.

== Mall of Asia Complex ==
The Mall of Asia Complex is a 67-hectare (170-acre) mixed-use development located within the surrounding areas of the Mall of Asia complex, and is owned and developed by SM Prime. The complex currently occupies the northern and southern channels situated along J.W. Diokno Boulevard and the western end of the EDSA. The complex serves as one of Henry Sy's vision to build a landmark within Metro Manila, and currently features events venues, mixed-use buildings, office towers, hotels, and transport hubs. The business park does not include the complex's condominiums, hotels, and other properties situated along the eastern side of J.W. Diokno Boulevard and EDSA.

The entirety of the Mall of Asia complex, which includes the SM Business Park and other nearby commercial buildings, office towers, and condominiums located across J.W. Diokno Boulevard and the Business Park complex comprises a total area of roughly 110 hectares (270 acres).

=== Sporting and event venues ===
==== SM Mall of Asia Arena ====
SM Mall of Asia Arena

The SM Mall of Asia Arena is an indoor arena within the SM Mall of Asia complex which has a seating capacity of 16,000 and a full house capacity of 20,000, which opened to the public on June 16, 2012. The arena is the alternative venue of the Philippine Basketball Association and the main venue of the University Athletic Association of the Philippines.

==== Concert grounds ====
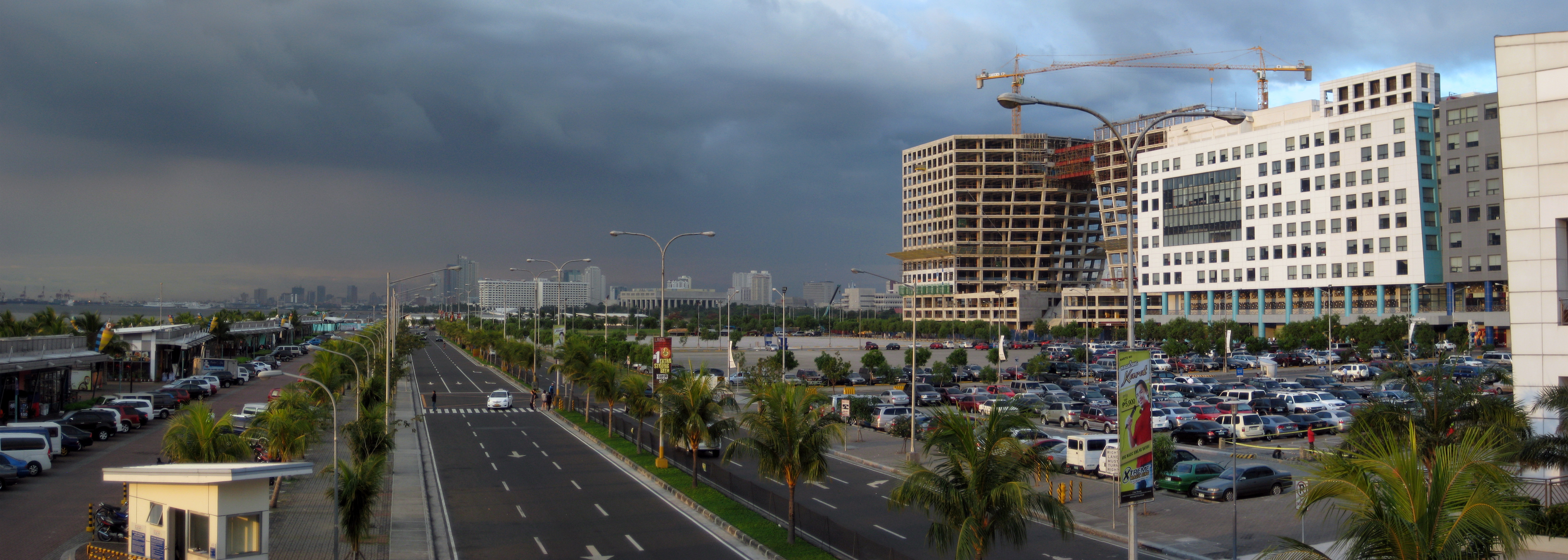
The Mall of Asia concert grounds (bottom center), pictured in 2011, are used as a parking lot when an event is not being held within the grounds.

The Mall of Asia concert grounds, also called the Mall of Asia parking grounds when there is no event, are public spaces located west of the E-com Center buildings that are used to hold mass gatherings, primarily concerts. When there is no event, the venue is used as a parking lot to accommodate employees of the E-com Center buildings, as well as mall guests.

The venue was the site of the Close-Up Forever Summer concert deaths that occurred in May 2016.

Amidst the COVID-19 pandemic in the Philippines which led cinemas to be closed since March 2020, SM Cinema opened up a drive-in cinema at this venue on September 9, 2020. It is the second drive-in-cinema in the country after SM City Pampanga.

The concert grounds formerly comprised two complex blocks: one that could accommodate about 30,000 persons, and another that brought the capacity to about 80,000. However, a portion of the southern block of the grounds were utilized for the construction of the Lanson Place hotel, decreasing the size of the concert grounds.

==== SMX Convention Center Manila ====
The SMX Convention Center Manila (formerly MAITrade Expo and Convention Center) is the Philippines' largest privately run exhibition and convention center.

The groundbreaking was held on March 23, 2006. The ₱900 million project was completed and inaugurated on November 5, 2007. It is used as an alternate with the nearby state-run Philippine International Convention Center and World Trade Center Metro Manila located in the CCP Complex, featuring large exhibition areas and function rooms.

The building is composed of three floors consisting of 4 exhibition halls, 5 function rooms, 14 meeting rooms, and retail space, and a basement parking with a total leasable area of 21,000 square meters (230,000 sq ft). Bridgeways on the second level connect SMX Convention Center Manila to the mall's South Parking Building, S Maison, MOA Square, and National University MOA, respectively.

==== SMX Center for International Trade and Exhibitions ====
A separate expansion that will be built southeast of the complex, which will be dubbed as SMXCITE (SMX Center for International Trade and Exhibitions), is currently in preparation stages and will open in 2027. The new center will have 18,000 square meters (190,000 sq ft) of leasable trade hall space on a combined 35,000 square meters (380,000 sq ft) of exhibition and event space shared with the existing SMX Manila, including five exhibition halls, four meeting rooms, and two VIP lounges, making it the largest convention center in the country upon completion.

=== Esplanade ===
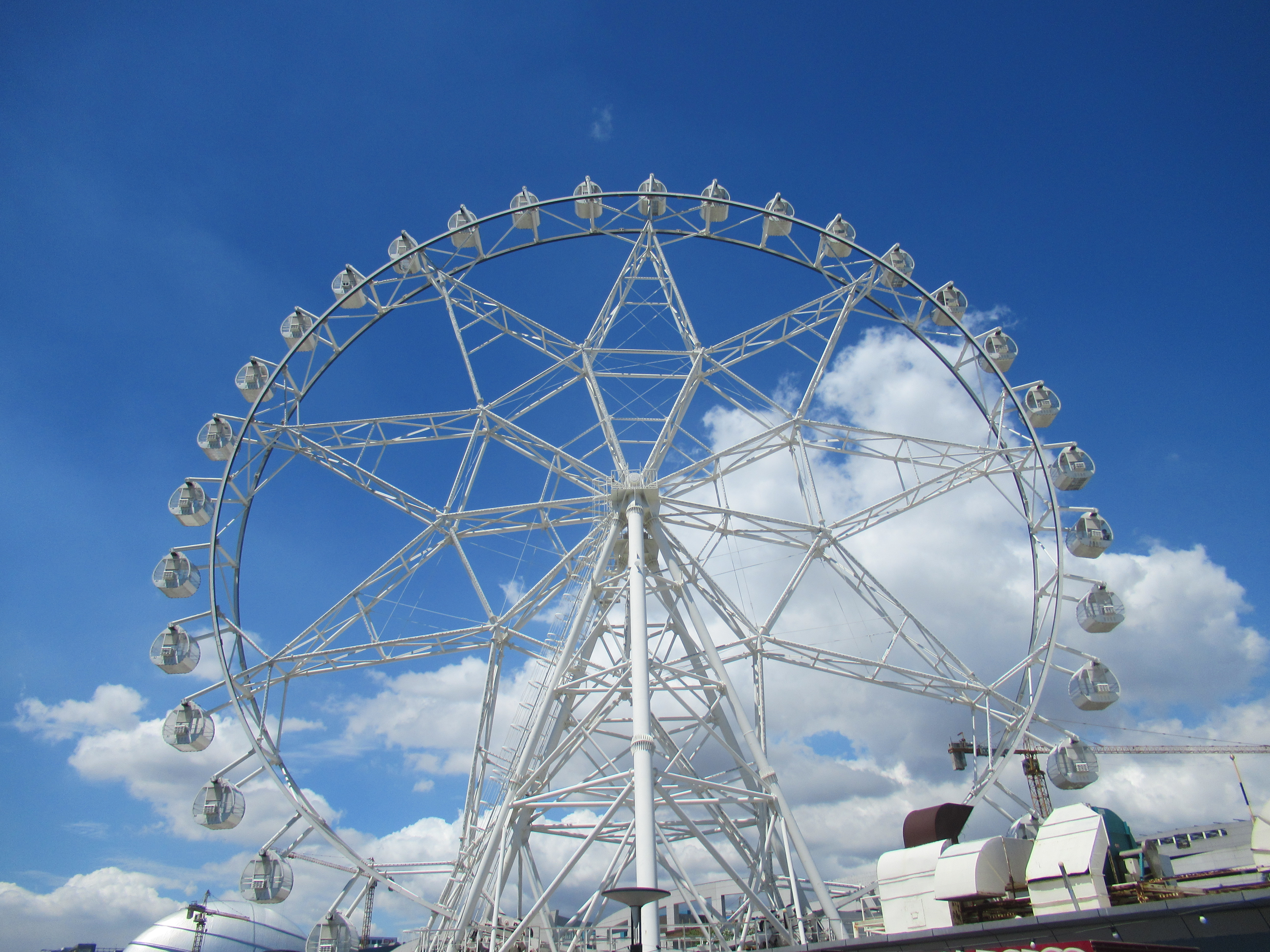
The MOA Eye

An esplanade was constructed at the back of the mall where it served as the venue for the World Pyro Olympics from 2005 to 2008, and since 2010 as the Philippine International Pyromusical Competition.

SM by the Bay Amusement Park is an amusement park situated along Manila Bay that opened to the public in 2011. The park currently has over 17 rides including the Mall of Asia Eye, which is also known as The Eye Of Asia, a 55-meter (180 ft) tall ferris wheel which opened on December 17, 2011. It has 36 air-conditioned gondolas, each able to carry up to six persons, giving a maximum capacity of 216 passengers. It also houses food stalls and offers a direct view to Manila Bay.

=== Archdiocesan Shrine of Jesus ===
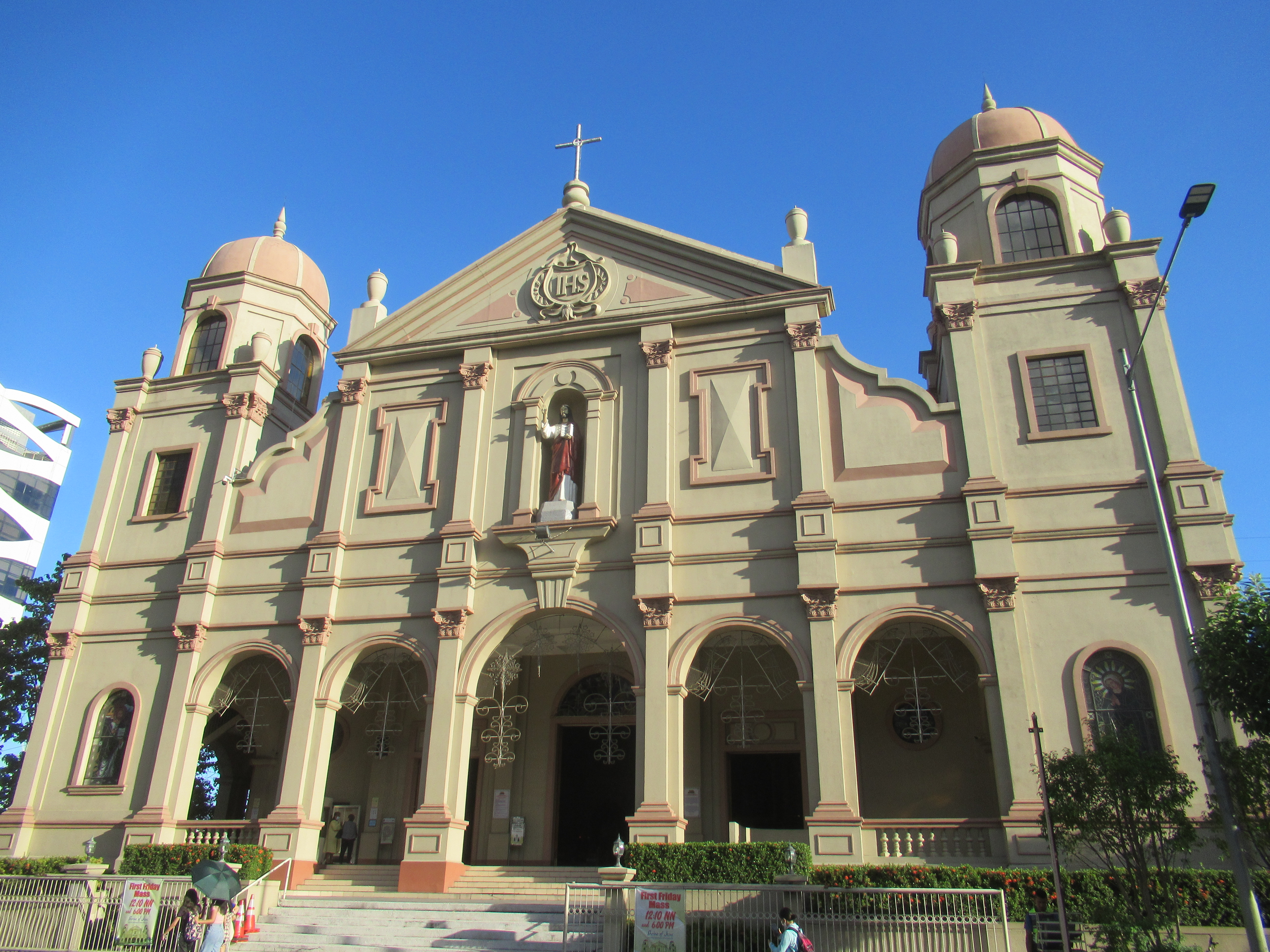
The façade of the Archdiocesan Shrine of Jesus The Way, The Truth, and The Life

The Archdiocesan Shrine of Jesus The Way, The Truth, and The Life is a Roman Catholic Church belonging to the Archdiocese of Manila located along Coral Way. Dedicated to Jesus, it was envisioned by Pope John Paul II when he visited the Philippines in 1995 for the World Youth Day. The land and the church were donated and built by Henry and Felicidad Sy.

=== Museo del Galeón ===
Museo del Galeón (formerly The Galeón) is a dome-shaped museum that features the history of the Manila Galleon trade system, in which (over a period of 250 years) the Philippines and Mexico played major roles. The main attraction is a full-sized replica of a Galleon ship, which was used for trading. The museum opened on May 1, 2026, after a lengthy delay due to undisclosed reasons.

=== Casa Ibarra MOA ===
The Casa Ibarra MOA is an events venue located along Coral Way and the Coral Way Parking Lot. The building is owned by Ibarra's Party Venues, an events venues owner and a catering services company.

=== Retail Buildings ===
==== LUXE Duty Free Mall of Asia ====
The LUXE Duty Free Mall of Asia is a duty-free shop located along J. W. Diokno Boulevard and across the planned Six E-com Center. The shopping complex was formerly the SMDC Showroom Building, which was completed in 2011 before renovation works began in late 2016. The mall is currently operated by Duty Free Philippines Corporation (DFPC) and opened its doors in late 2018, which were graced by Tourism Secretary Bernadette Romulo-Puyat, SMDC Chairman and CEO Henry Sy Jr., and other high-ranking officials. The upscale shopping complex a total floor area of 3,636 m^{2} (39,140 sq ft), and features high-end foreign retail brands in cosmetics, confectioneries, fashion, fragrance, and wines, such as Bally, Bobbi Brown Cosmetics, Coach New York, Chanel, Clarins, Dior, Estée Lauder, Kate Spade New York, Lancôme, Laneige, Michael Kors, MAC Cosmetics, MCM Worldwide, Tom Ford, Shiseido and other luxury brands.

=== Mixed-Use Buildings ===
==== Mall of Asia Arena Annex Building ====
The façade of MAAX Building

The Mall of Asia Annex (MAAX) Building is a 12-storey office building, located across the SM Mall of Asia Arena. Located at the intersection of Coral Way and J.W. Diokno Boulevard, the 12-floor building features a design inspired from the adjacent Mall of Asia Arena, which features an "eye-inspired" exterior design, and is also fitted with low-e coated and fritted insulated glass units. The MAAX building has 6-levels of multi parking spaces capable of storing 1,400 cars. The building is occupied by various shops and restaurants in the mall's retail area at the ground level and also houses The Food Village, a food court complex featuring Filipino and international dining areas. The building has 11,936 m^{2} (128,480 sq ft) of office space, and its office tenants within the building's three upper floors are the Philippine Skating Union, Suntrust Resort Holdings Inc., formerly known as Suncity Group Manila Inc., and Teleperformance. It is also connected to SM Mall of Asia Arena and the rest of SM Mall of Asia through a pedestrian bridgeway.

==== MOA Square ====
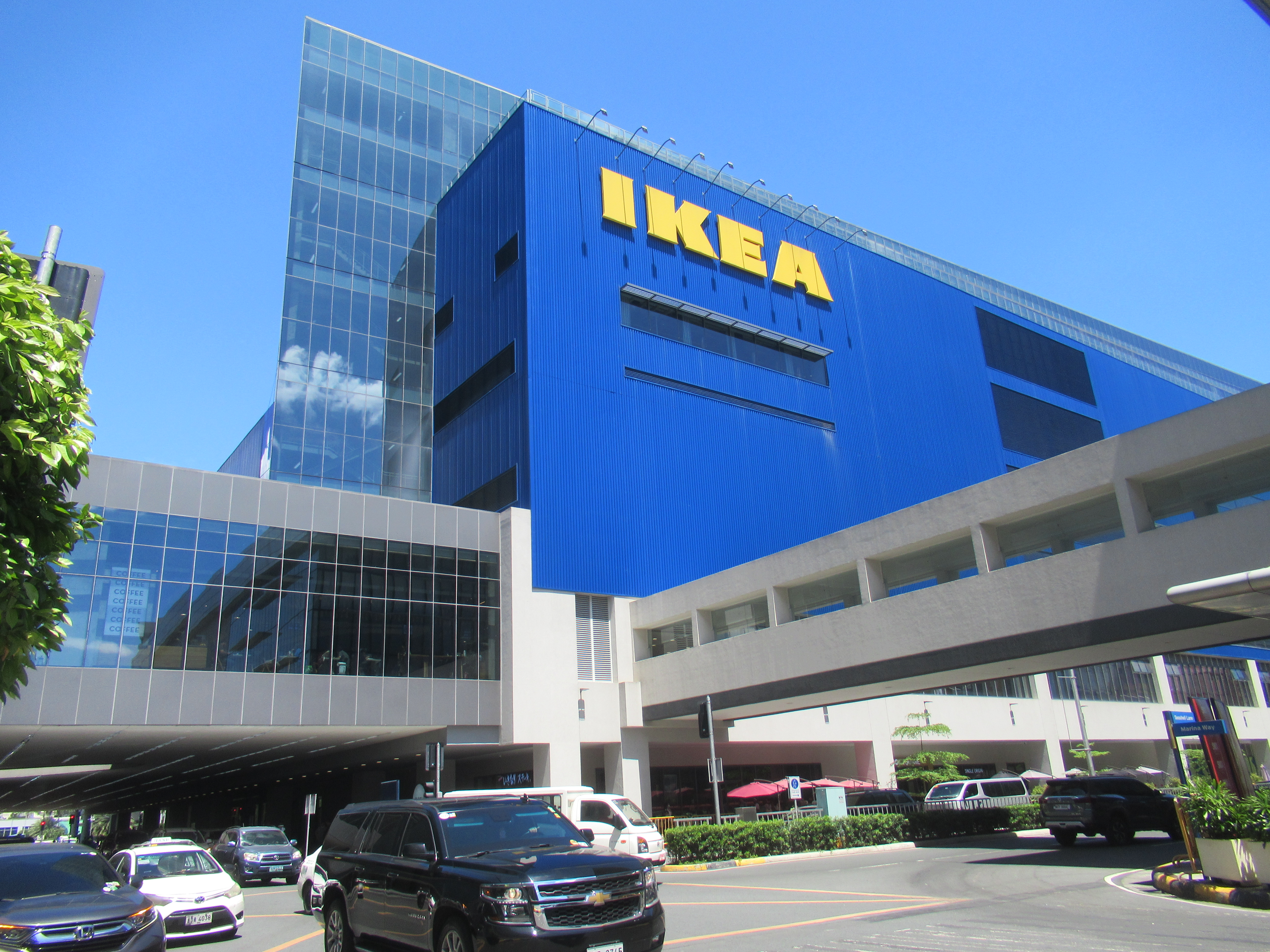
The façade of MOA Square

MOA Square is an eight-storey expansion building to SM Mall of Asia that houses IKEA Pasay City, unique home living stores and concepts, in-house contact center, an e-commerce facility, restaurants, a warehouse, office spaces, and additional parking spaces. Costing ₱7 billion, it is located between the SMX Convention Center Manila and Mall of Asia Arena and is interconnected with the mall's South Parking Building through an eastern Level 2 bridgeway, with shops in the parking building's eastern edge regarded as part of MOA Square since its northern entrance is situated there. The construction for the building began in September 2018 and topped off in 2020. It opened on November 24, 2021.

First in the Philippines, IKEA Pasay City has a floor space of 65,000 m^{2} (700,000 sq ft), making it IKEA's largest store in the world, beating its Gwangmyeong branch in South Korea that has 57,100 m^{2} (615,000 sq ft) of floor space, and serves as the complex's biggest tenant since the mall's opening in 2006. It occupies MOA Square's second to fourth floors. The branch was expected to open in 2020, but was delayed due to the COVID-19 pandemic; it instead opened on November 25, 2021. The opening of IKEA made SM Mall of Asia the largest mall in the Philippines once again; the last time was from 2006 to 2008. The building's two topmost floors feature office spaces and are primarily occupied by SM Prime, which serves as the main tenant of the office levels of the building and currently serves as the company's headquarters.

==== National University Mall of Asia ====
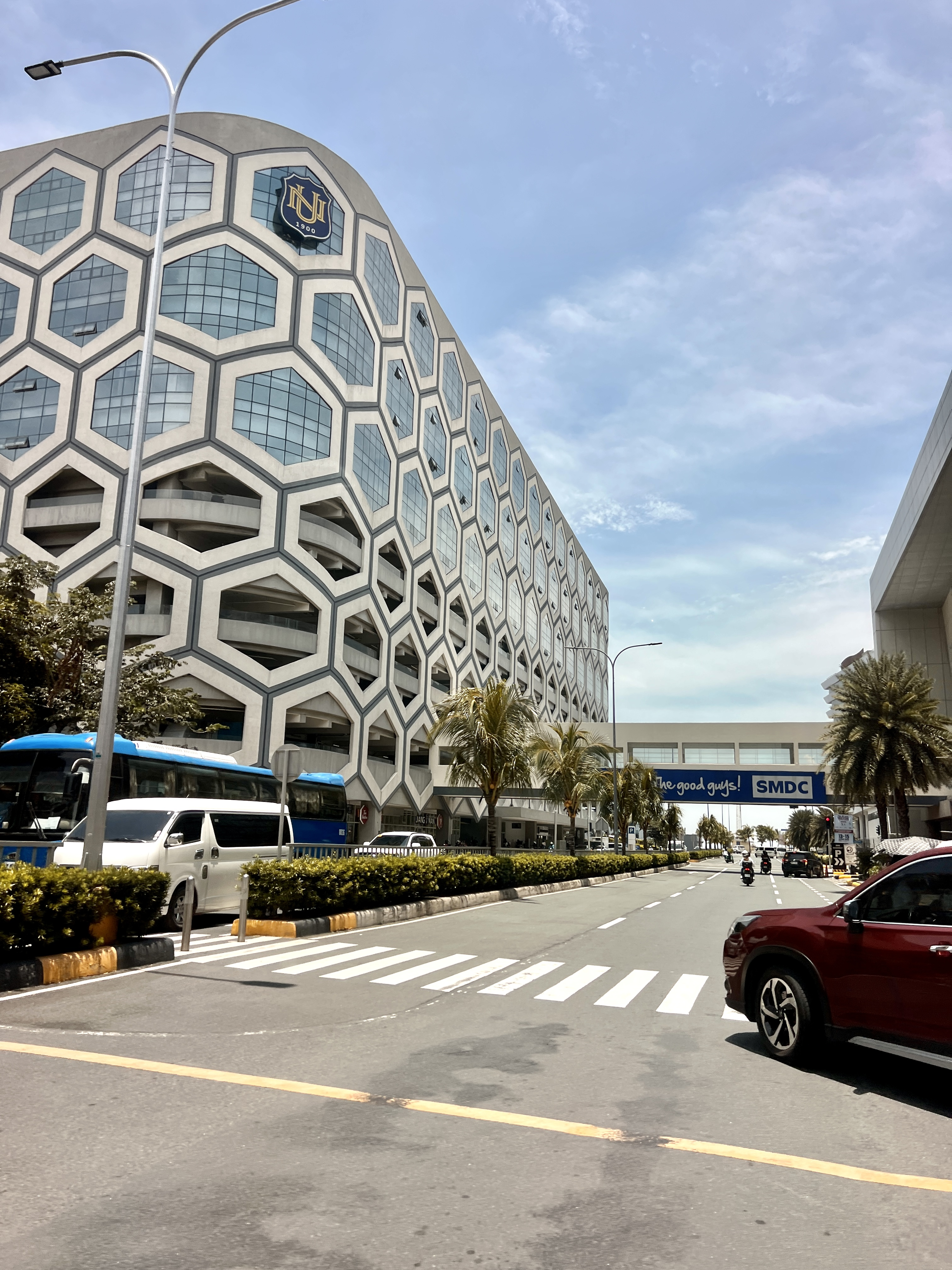
The façade of the National University Mall of Asia building

The National University Mall of Asia, also known as NU MOA or NUMA, is the satellite campus of the Manila-based university, also owned mostly by SM Investments, located along Coral Way. The campus occupies a 7-storey building located beside Microtel by Wyndham Mall of Asia and is directly connected to the SMX Convention Center Manila. The campus also features various shops within the ground floor, a 3-level parking facility that can accommodate approximately 720 cars and a gross leasable area of 21,201.02 m^{2} (228,205.9 sq ft). The building opened on September 17, 2019, hosting the NU Senior High School, NU College of Optometry, and the NU College of Dentistry, which serves as an extension to the NU Manila campus, and offers courses such as the Doctor of Dental Medicine, Dental Hygiene and Dental Laboratory Technology. The campus also offers courses, ranging from business courses, medical technology, and psychology.

==== Oceanaire Luxurious Residences ====
The Oceanaire Luxurious Residences is a 15-storey two tower development owned by Zhongfa Development, Inc. located along Sunrise Drive, which was completed during the 4th quarter of 2015. The condominium is also occupied by the Golden Phoenix Hotel Manila, a 281-room 4-star hotel, making the complex the second hotel to open in the area, and features a bar and a spa, located within the amenity area of the building.

==== The Concordia Place ====
The Concordia Place is a 15-storey twin tower mixed-use development owned by Lakeview Super Five Corp. The first tower will feature residential units while the second tower will feature office spaces. Construction for the complex began in January 2019 and is set to be completed within 2024.

=== Hotels ===
==== Microtel by Wyndham Mall of Asia ====
The Microtel by Wyndham Mall of Asia is a 150-room hotel located along Coral Way. The hotel opened in 2010 and serves as the first hotel to open in the complex. It features the Millie's All-day dining restaurant, a function room with a maximum capacity of up to 200 persons, and a roofdeck swimming pool.

==== Conrad Manila ====
The façade of Conrad Manila

The Mall of Asia Complex also host the Conrad Manila, a 347-room hotel located between the SMX Convention Center Manila and the Esplanade and stands along Palm Coast Avenue and the corner of Seaside Boulevard. Opened in 2016, the hotel serves as the complex's premier class hotel. Its podium houses the S Maison, a 2-storey retail area and the Dessert Museum, a candy-themed art exhibition. The S Maison is considered by SM Prime a separate mall from the main SM Mall of Asia shopping mall complex as the mall targets the upper income levels, and is designated as the 62nd SM Supermall in the Philippines.

==== Hotel101 Manila ====
The Hotel101 Manila is a 518-room 3-star hotel located along EDSA. Groundbreaking began in June 2012, and was opened in July 2016, which was graced by then-Tourism Secretary Wanda Tulfo Teo and other high officials. The hotel is owned by Hotel of Asia, Inc., a subsidiary of the DoubleDragon Properties and serves as Hotel 101's first and flagship hotel in the country. The hotel featuring the Horizon Café, an all-day dining restaurant, a swimming pool and Jacuzzi, both located at the 2nd floor.

==== Tryp by Wyndham Manila ====
The Tryp Manila, owned by Wyndham Hotels & Resorts, is located beside The Esplanade, and across the Three E-Com Center and stands along the Seaside Boulevard and the corner of J.W. Diokno Boulevard. The hotel is completed in 2018 serves as the fourth hotel located in the complex owned by SM Prime, after Conrad Manila and Microtel by Wyndham Mall of Asia, but offers lower rates and features 191 rooms and 3 restaurants, namely the Milagritos, the Encaramada pool bar, and the Beberitos lobby lounge.

==== Lanson Place Mall of Asia ====
The Lanson Place Mall of Asia is a 11-storey hotel and service suite building located across the Galeón complex and the One Ecom Center, and sits on the westernmost area of the Concert Grounds. The hotel serves as the first Lanson Place in the country and features 247 hotel rooms and 143 serviced suites units, featuring a seaside-inspired sleek and contemporary architectural style. Plans for the hotel being laid out in the complex began as early as 2016, and faced many delays, including challenges caused by the COVID-19 pandemic in the country. The building serves as the fourth hotel owned by SM and the fifth hotel located in the complex and also features a rooftop swimming pool, an al-fresco center on the ground floor, a fitness center, an all-day dining restaurant; seven meeting rooms, which is also connected to co-working spaces at the third floor; and a pillarless ballroom that can accommodate 800 people, known as the Saffron, located at the second floor. The ₱3.6 billion building was topped off in August 2021, and was completed and opened its doors in a soft opening in November 2023.

On April 24, 2024, SM Hotels and Conventions Corporation chief executive officer Michael Hobson opened the hybrid hotel and serviced residences property with 397-rooms and 143-room serviced suites. The hotel was designed by WTA Design Studio and features artworks made by Nestor O. Jardin, who served as a former President of the Cultural Center of the Philippines, known for his artworks and sea-inspired craftsmanship, including Leeroy New's huge ocean waves design of the second floor ceiling, while the Grand Ballroom is adorned with ripples of an ocean. The hotel also houses 5 restaurants, namely the Blk 12 Café Bar, Bytes Grab & Go, Cyan Modern Kitchen, Edge Pool Bar, Madeleine High Tea.

=== Office buildings ===
The Four E-Com Center

The E-com Center complex serves as the Mall of Asia complex's office tower development, occupied by various companies, mainly business process outsourcing, cruising companies, and shipping firms. It was designed by Arquitectonica. It currently has five completed hubs named One E-Com Center, Two E-Com Center, Three E-Com Center, Four E-Com Center, and Five E-Com Center.

The One E-Com is the first to be completed opening in 2008. One E-Com Center was completed in 2008. The Six E-Com Center is under-construction as of 2026.

The SM Retail Headquarters also holds a 14-storey building in another part of the Mall of Asia complex.

=== Residential condominiums ===
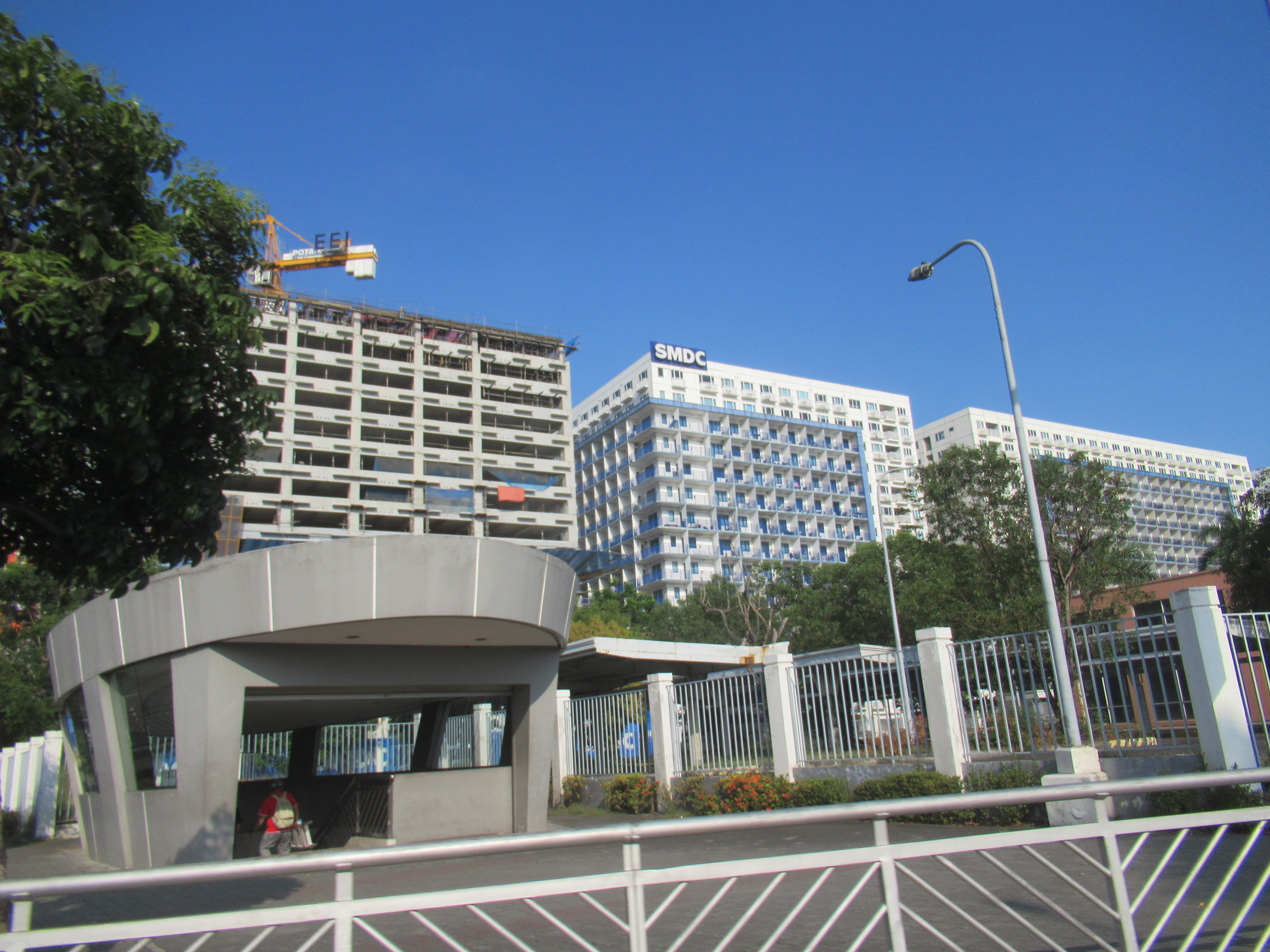
SMDC Sea Residences

The Mall of Asia has four residential condominium properties owned by SM Development Corporation (SMDC), SM Prime's residential development subsidiary, which include the Sea Residences, a six-tower complex; the Shell Residences, a four-tower complex; the Shore Residences, which has 3 separate residential condominium complexes, named Shore with 3 towers, Shore 2 with another 3 towers, and Shore 3 with 6 towers; the S Residences, a three-tower complex; and the Sail Residences, a four-tower development. The buildings were based on modern resort-themed architectural designs. In August 2021, SMDC unveiled a new residential project within the complex, the ICE Tower, an 844 unit residential-office (RESO) development, located across the EDSA. The new residential development is expected to be completed within 2023–2024.

== Transportation ==
South Transport Terminal

The mall features a 20-seater tram service providing connectivity within the mall complex, and also features two transport terminals operated by Supermalls Transport Services, Inc., providing transportation services to nearby areas in Metro Manila and nearby Cavite, Batangas, and Laguna provinces. A bus stop is also located at the Globe Rotunda, fronting the Main Mall and serves as a bus station of various bus lines, including the southbound EDSA Carousel.

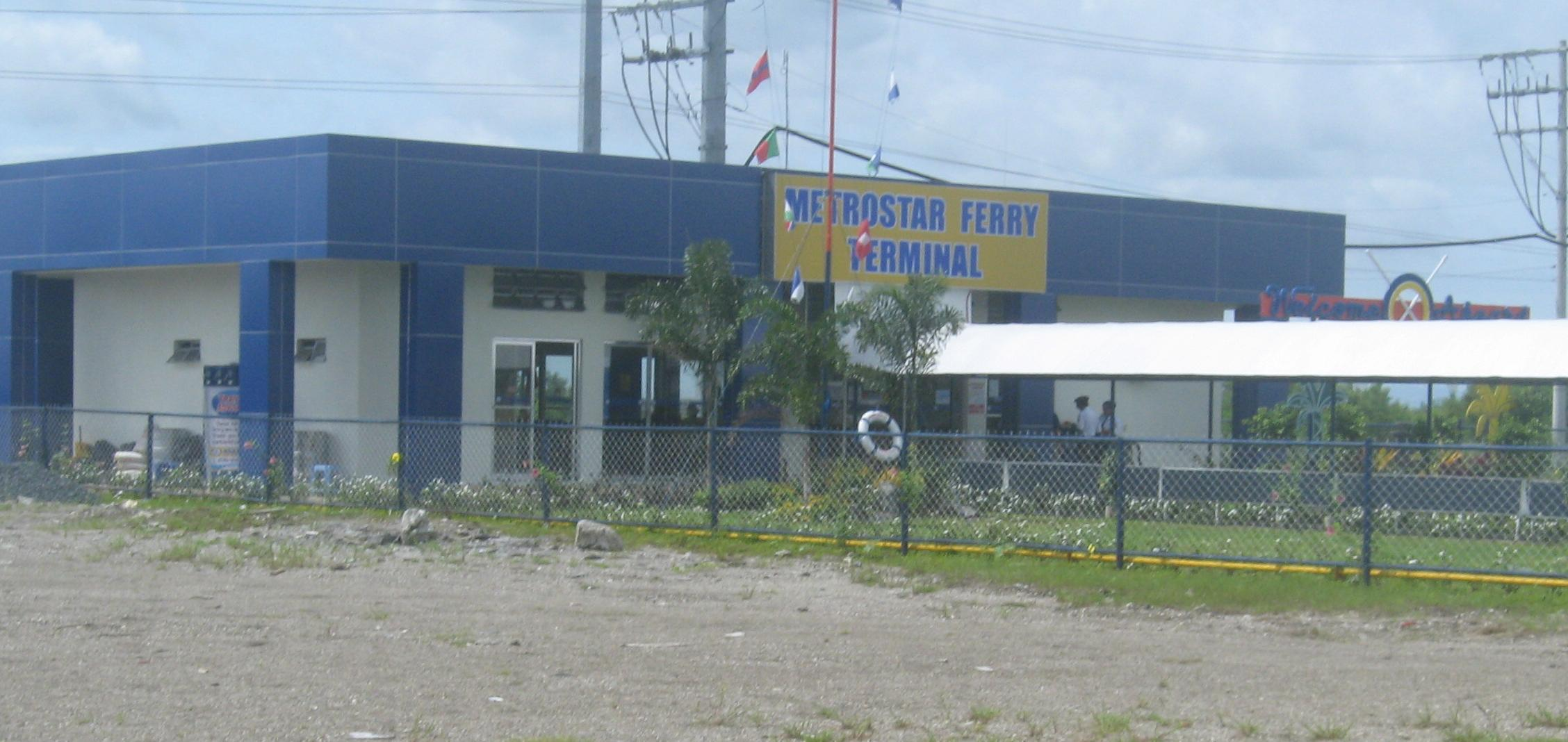
MetroStar Ferry Terminal

Adjacent to the convention center is the MetroStar Ferry Terminal ferry service to Cavite City. The terminal also serves as a passenger port to SM's tourism estate, the Hamilo Coast, in Nasugbu, Batangas.

In 2007, Philippine Export-Import Credit Agency (PhilEXIM) inaugurated the ₱135 million ferry project between Cavite City and SM Mall of Asia. PhilEXIM President Virgilio R. Angelo stated that it guaranteed the loan of Metrostar Ferry, Inc. (Metrostar) for the government's Manila Bay Transport Project. Angelo stated that the ferry service would also open in the Cavite City-Luneta Boardwalk-Del Pan Bridge waterway. In 2018, the ferry service was initially suspended, yet plans for the revival of the project were put in place in 2019. Another ferry service connecting SM Mall of Asia to the Bataan province was also inaugurated. A ferry service which will bring passengers to and from Sangley Point Airport is being proposed.

In June 2022, the SM Group and the Department of Transportation (DOTr) unveiled a plan for the construction of a 1.8-kilometer (1.1 mi) integrated monorail system in Pasay, connecting the complex to the Taft Avenue station of the MRT Line 3. This initiative is aimed to not only increase the complex's accessibility but will also ease traffic congestion in the area.

== Incidents and accidents ==
=== Main mall ===
- September 15, 2013: An 11-year-old boy was hurt when the ceiling of a mall's portion was damaged. The mall management said the damage of a portion of the mall's South Arcade ceiling was "due to rains and strong winds."
- March 30, 2014: A robbery and shootout occurred when the Martilyo Gang, a local criminal group specializing in robbing stores by smashing and stealing valuables using hammers, robbed a jewelry store using pipe wrenches instead of hammers at the department store's first floor. One suspect was arrested during the incident.
- February 13, 2018: A restaurant in the mall caught fire at 11:14 am, lasting for over 30 minutes before being declared under control at 11:50 am. No one was hurt during the incident.
- October 2, 2018: A ceiling at the second level of the main mall fell down in the midst of heavy rain on Tuesday afternoon, causing rainwater to runoff in front of a beauty shop. No one was hurt during the incident.

=== Concert grounds ===
- May 22, 2016: Five people died after taking alleged illegal drugs during a rave dance party organized by Close-Up entitled Forever Summer, which was headlined by Belgian DJ duo Dimitri Vegas and Like Mike at the concert grounds.
- December 8, 2018: A number of unruly mallgoers forced the cancellation of the Coke Studio Christmas Concert at the mall's concert grounds the previous night. Coca-Cola in a statement said there was "pushing, jumping on the barricades and throwing bottles" by "portions" that threatened the safety of the entire crowd at the concert. Police on the next day said some 50 people were attended to by rescuers either for fainting or sustaining bruises. The concert would be rescheduled for the next year.

== Notable events ==
- GMA Network began hosting its countdown television special at the mall's Seaside Boulevard with Celebrate to '08: The GMA New Year Countdown Special (2007–2008). It takes place yearly on December 31—New Year's Eve. The event was not held for three years (2020–2021, 2021–2022 and 2022–2023) due to the COVID-19 pandemic in the Philippines.
- The Grand Mascot Parade is held every New Year's Day.
- Angels Walk for Autism, organized by the Autism Society Philippines, has been held there since 2015.
- The Philippine International Pyromusical Competition was held every year at the mall's bayside area from 2010 to 2018 and since 2024, as well as its precursor, the World Pyro Olympics in 2005, 2007, and 2008.
- On January 30, 2017, the 65th Miss Universe pageant was held at the Mall of Asia Arena.
- In September 2019, LIGA2: KONTRABIDA, a Mobile Legends: Bang Bang event, was hosted at Music Hall with Nadine Lustre as ambassador.

== Notes ==
| Preceded by SM City Clark | 25th SM Supermall; 2006 | Succeeded by SM Center Pasig |
