= E-Com Centers =

Project
- Construction started: 2006
- Completed: 2027 (targeted completion)
- Opening date: 2008 (first building)
- Status: In progress
- Developer: SM Prime
- Architect: Arquitectonica
- Operator: SM Prime Commercial Properties Group

Physical features
- Major buildings: One E-com Center; Two E-com Center; Three E-com Center; Four E-com Center; Five E-com Center

Location
- Location in Metro Manila, Philippines
- Coordinates: 14.5394°N 120.9819°E
- Country: Philippines
- Location: Central Business Park I-A, Pasay, Metro Manila

The E-Com Centers (Note: Names of the buildings are stylized as OneE-com Center, TwoE-com Center, ThreeE-com Center, FourE-com Center, and FiveE-com Center) are a complex of office buildings that are part of the Mall of Asia Complex at the Central Business Park I-A in Pasay, Metro Manila, Philippines. Located on the northern area of the complex, the office buildings are designed by Arquitectonica. The complex currently consists of five buildings, each having its very own open-air outdoor garden at the fifth floors, and a series of link bridges connecting each of the towers to the SM Mall of Asia. The buildings are currently occupied by business process outsourcing (BPO) companies, shipping & logistics firms, financial services, and subsidiaries of the conglomerate SM Investments.

== History ==
The SM Group had the groundbreaking of the first structure, the One E-Com Center on March 8, 2006 near the nearly complete SM Mall of Asia in an area the company then refer to as the "SM Central Business Park" (renamed as the Mall of Asia Complex in 2007) The office building was meant to house business process outsourcing and other technology-oriented companies. One E-Com Center was completed in 2008.

The E-Com Center complex was reportedly planned to contain six buildings as early as 2014.

Two E-Com Center, the second building in the complex, was completed in December 2011. Five E-Com Center, the third structure, was launched in May 2012.

This was followed by the Three E-Com Center which broke ground in 2014 and opened in 2018, and the launch of the Four E-Com in 2023.

As of 2026, Six E-Com Center is under construction as the latest addition to the E-Com development.

== Architecture and design ==
The E-Com Centers was designed by Arquitectonica together with local partner Felix Lim and features futuristic and tech-oriented designs, such as geometric forms and angles on certain buildings, while having an integrated elevated pedestrian bridge network. The developers of the complex is restricted by the building height restrictions imposed on the area due to proximity to the Ninoy Aquino International Airport. The complex's plan includes six main buildings, each built on roughly 10,000 square meters (110,000 sq ft) of land.

== Buildings ==
The E-Com Center buildings currently comprise of five buildings, each having 2-3 towers each. All buildings are interconnected with elevated link bridges while also having direct connections to the SM Mall of Asia through the mall's North Parking Building. The complex are also certified by PEZA. Three of the buildings have LEED Gold certification, namely the Three E-com Center, Four E-com Center and Five E-com Center. The complex currently has 399,000 m^{2} (4,294,800.26 sq ft) of gross leasable area, and is set to have 459,000 m^{2} (4,940,634.88 sq ft) upon completion.

=== Summary ===
Building	Picture	Opened	Storeys	Gross floor area	Ref.
One E-Com Center		2008	10	105,857 m^{2} (1,139,440 sq ft)	
Two E-Com Center		2012	15	104,000 m^{2} (1,120,000 sq ft)	
Five E-Com Center		2015	15	138,000 m^{2} (1,490,000 sq ft)	
Three E-Com Center		2018	15	121,000 m^{2} (1,300,000 sq ft)	
Four E-Com Center		2022–2023	15	174,000 m^{2} (1,870,000 sq ft)	
Six E-Com Center		Under construction	15		

=== Individual buildings ===
==== One E-com Center ====
The 11-storey building has a total leasable floor area of 69,000 m^{2} (740,000 sq ft) and was completed in the first week of October 2007 and features a geometric architectural style. Its first occupant, Fitness First started operations on October 12, 2007. SM Investments serves as the tower's main tenant.

==== Two E-com Center ====
The Two E-com Center is a 15-storey twin tower complex with prism-like building designs. Construction of the complex began in 2009 and was completed in 2011, The building has a total leasable floor area of 77,000 m^{2} (830,000 sq ft). SM Development Corporation serves as the main tenant of the tower.

==== Three E-com Center ====
The third tower, the Three E-com Center, began construction in 2015 and was launched and opened in 2018. It consists of two 15-storey semi-circular towers. The Three E-com Center is LEED Gold Certified and has a total leasable floor area of 68,000 m^{2} (730,000 sq ft).

==== Four E-com Center ====
The fourth tower of the complex is the Four E-Com Center, a three-tower 15-storey complex that features crystallized rhombus designs on the tower's shaped and facade exteriors. The towers also possesses a LEED Platinum Certification. Construction began on 2016 before being topped-off in 2019, and was initially planned to open in 2020, however, due to the effects of the COVID-19 pandemic in the country, the building's opening was delayed and was structurally completed on the second quarter of 2021, before being launched in March 2023. The tower has a total leasable area of 100,000 m^{2} (1,100,000 sq ft), making the tower the largest office tower complex in the Mall of Asia area.

==== Five E-Com Center ====
The fifth tower is named the Five E-Com Center, which was opened in 2015 and features a stacked building design. It was formerly known as the original Three E-com Center. The tower is LEED-certified has 85,000 m^{2} (910,000 sq ft) of office area and houses contact centers and non-contact center tenants.

==== Six E-com Center ====
The sixth tower within the office complex, the Six E-com Center, is currently under construction. The tower was initially planned to be constructed in 2016, yet preparatory and groundbreaking works initially began in May 2023. The complex will consist of two linear, all-glass towers designed in collaboration with WCY Architects, Design & Development Consultants, and is located in a former parking lot between the North Parking Building and the Five E-com Center, set to rise alongside Sunset Avenue. The upcoming office development is a pre-certified LEED Gold development and will have a total floor area of 60,000 m^{2} (650,000 sq ft). SM Offices also tapped Monolith Construction and Development Corporation as the project's general contractor. The tower is aimed to be completed within 2026.

== Incidents ==
- September 11, 2025: A video circulated online showing security personnel apprehending a stray dog in front of the One E-Com Center. The incident, which showed the dog visibly distressed, drew significant public criticism and sparked a debate on the mall's policies regarding stray animals. The video's uploader and many online commentators questioned the mall's approach, comparing it unfavorably to the practices of other establishments, such as other malls, which are often praised for their animal welfare initiatives. The incident reignited a broader conversation about corporate responsibility towards strays in public spaces. After the backlash, the dog was brought to the Pasay City Veterinary Office and was declared safe.
- December 21, 2025: A fire was reported at the 6th floor of the Three E-Com Center. It was declared under control at 11:16 pm.
