= Metrostar =

Metrostar or Metrostars may refer to:

== Sports ==
- New York Red Bulls, formerly called the "MetroStars", a soccer team from New York
- DEG Metro Stars, German hockey club
- Manila Metrostars, a Philippine basketball team
- Mississauga MetroStars, a defunct professional indoor soccer team that played in the Major Arena Soccer League
- North Eastern MetroStars, a football club from Adelaide, South Australia which plays in the National Premier League South Australia

== Other uses ==
- MetroStar Award, a French-Canadian award for television, now known as the Artis Award
- Manila Metro Rail Transit System Line 3, popularly called "The Metrostar Express", a part of the metropolitan rail system in Manila
- Metrostar Ferry, a passenger ferry service on Manila Bay

== See also ==
- Metro FC (disambiguation)
