= Metro FC =

Metro FC refers to a number of association football clubs:

- Metro FC (Australia), based in Hobart, Australia
- Metro FC (New Zealand), based in Auckland, New Zealand
- Canberra FC, formerly Metro FC, a club in Canberra, Australia
- Coquitlam Metro-Ford Soccer Club, based in Coquitlam, Canada
- Persekam Metro FC, based in East Java, Indonesia

== See also ==
- Metrostars (disambiguation)
