= Philippine International Pyromusical Competition =

Annual fireworks contest in Philippines

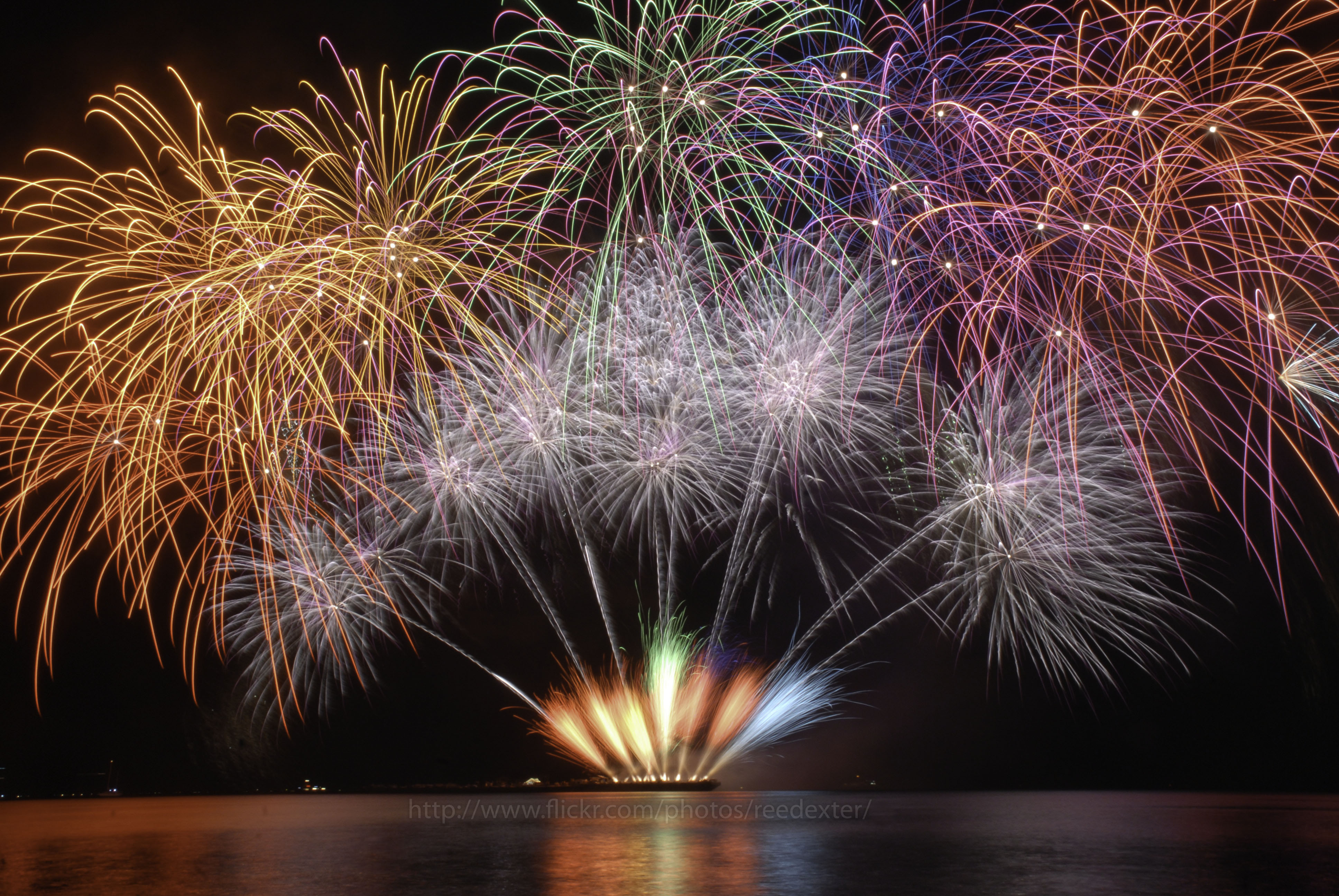
- Fireworks display by Howards and Sons Pyrotechnics of Australia in 2010
- Status: Active
- Genre: Fireworks competition
- Venue: SM Mall of Asia (2005–2008; 2010–2018, 2024–present); SM City Clark (2019)
- Country: Philippines
- Inaugurated: December 26, 2005 (World Pyro Olympics); February 14, 2010 (Philippine International Pyromusical Competition)
- Previous event: March 7 — April 11, 2026
- Next event: 2027
- Major events: Fireworks display
- Website: www.pyrophil.com

The Philippine International Pyromusical Competition (PIPC), initially known as the World Pyro Olympics (WPO), is an annual competition among fireworks manufacturers from different countries held in the Philippines which at its current format runs for five to six weeks every Saturday evening (initially five days in the competition's old format as the World Pyro Olympics) at SM Mall of Asia in Pasay. Two countries fire each day; the last participant fires on the final evening of the event.

The host of the event does not participate in the competition but performs a fireworks display on the first and last nights. Awards, such as the People's Choice, are given out after the exhibition. The crowning of the competition's winners ends the event.

== History ==
=== Beginnings and foundation ===
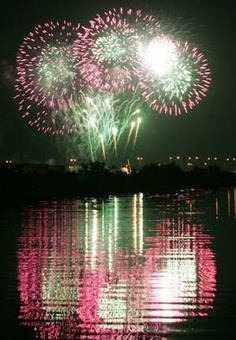
The World Pyro Olympics in December 2005.

In 1988, Ricardo "Ricky" Crisostomo of La Mancha Group International (LMGI), visited a three-day fireworks competition in Europe. His son, Rob, recalled in The Philippine Star that his father was "awestruck" on what he experienced. LMGI was once the leading pyrotechnics company in the Philippines, and the Crisostomo family wanted to bring the concept of such a competition to the country.

La Mancha previously performed fireworks displays during the Philippine Centennial in 1998, and were commissioned by the country's Department of Tourism for its Wow Philippines campaign. It then organized the 1st International Fireworks Festival in December 2002 and the World Pyro Olympics Exhibition in March and April 2004.

=== World Pyro Olympics (2005–2008) ===
The first World Pyro Olympics took place in 2005 in The Esplanade at the back of the-then unfinished SM Mall of Asia in Pasay, Metro Manila, Philippines from December 26 to 30. Firework materials were placed in the participant's barge floating within Manila Bay, around 300 meters (980 ft) from the seawall. It was participated by nine foreign countries. The event host, La Mancha Group, along with the nine foreign fireworks makers, held a fireworks demonstration on the last day. Australia emerged as the champion.

The second WPO was hosted again at The Esplanade at the then newly completed SM Mall of Asia from January 5 to 13, 2007. Nine foreign countries competed in the second edition. The United Kingdom emerged as champions, while the team from China won an award for technical precision. It attracted 500,000 spectators at the main venue and over a million people in surrounding areas.

Rob Crisostomo recalled in The Philippine Star about the difficulty of producing shows for five consecutive evenings. It was then decided in 2008 to hold the third WPO for five Saturdays, rather than five straight evenings, from May 3 to 31. The third event was postponed to the following week due to heavy rains and rough seas brought by Tropical Storm Halong (Dindo). The countries that participated were Canada, China, France, Germany, Italy, and Venezuela. Italy won the said competition.

The World Pyro Olympics was often criticized for creating heavy traffic jams, but Rob Crisostomo defended the show, saying that he and La Mancha created it for "families to come together" and not "to create monstrous traffic jams."

In 2009, La Mancha planned to move the World Pyro Olympics to Bonifacio Global City in Taguig, to be held on five Saturdays from November to December in the lead-up to the Christmas season. Apart from the fireworks displays, it would have featured an exhibit of cars, marching bands, and play areas and bazaars. However, the WPO committee decided to postpone the event to early 2010, citing non-stop rains and subsequent flooding that affected the safety of the venue.

=== Philippine International Pyromusical Competition (2010–present) ===
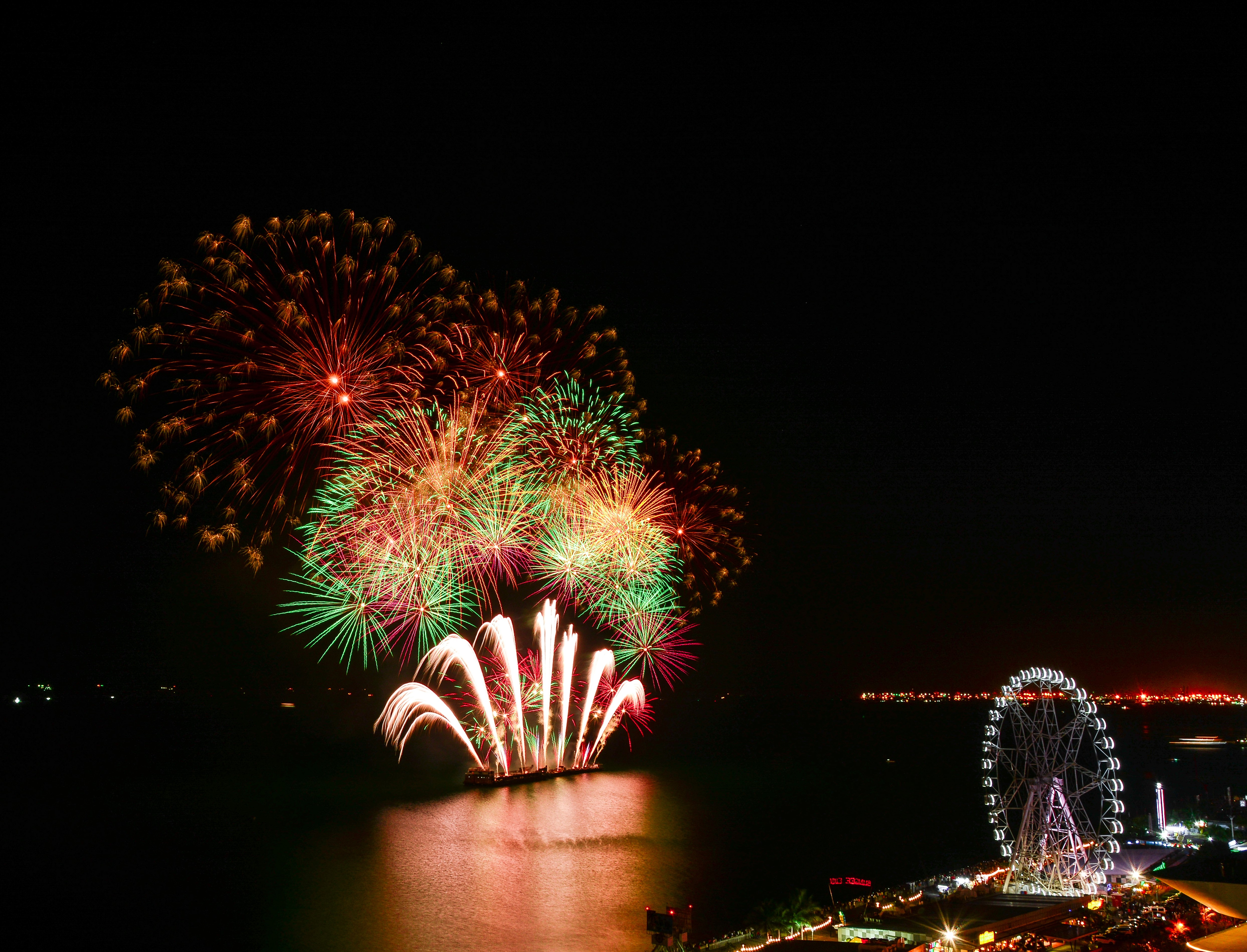
Fireworks display by Platinum Fireworks of the Philippines in 2018.

SM Supermalls partnered with Platinum Fireworks, Inc. for the first Philippine International Pyromusical Competition (PIPC). On February 14, 2010, Platinum Fireworks kicked off the competition by performing an opening exhibition. The opening night coincided with Valentine's Day and Chinese New Year. It was then held at SM Mall of Asia every Sunday from February to March. The United States, United Kingdom, China, France, Japan, Singapore, Malaysia and Australia participated in the competition. Each participant performs a fireworks display for a minimum of fifteen minutes. The Philippines then closed the first edition on March 14.

In 2011, the competition moved to Saturdays, where it has remained ever since. The competition expanded to six weeks from five in 2012. From 2011 to 2013, the Philippines provided only the closing exhibitions, before performing both opening and closing exhibitions by 2014. Since 2013, the Philippine Pyro Enthusiasts Association has been one of the most prominent supporters of the PIPC. The association is composed primarily of Filipino members, along with a select number of international affiliates, all of whom actively advocate for the growth and recognition of the fireworks and pyrotechnics industry in the Philippines.

In 2019, competition organizers moved the Philippine International Pyromusical Competition from SM Mall of Asia to SM City Clark in Angeles City, Pampanga, to support the Manila Bay Rehabilitation Program by the Department of Environment and Natural Resources (DENR). The schedule was also adjusted by a week to give respect.

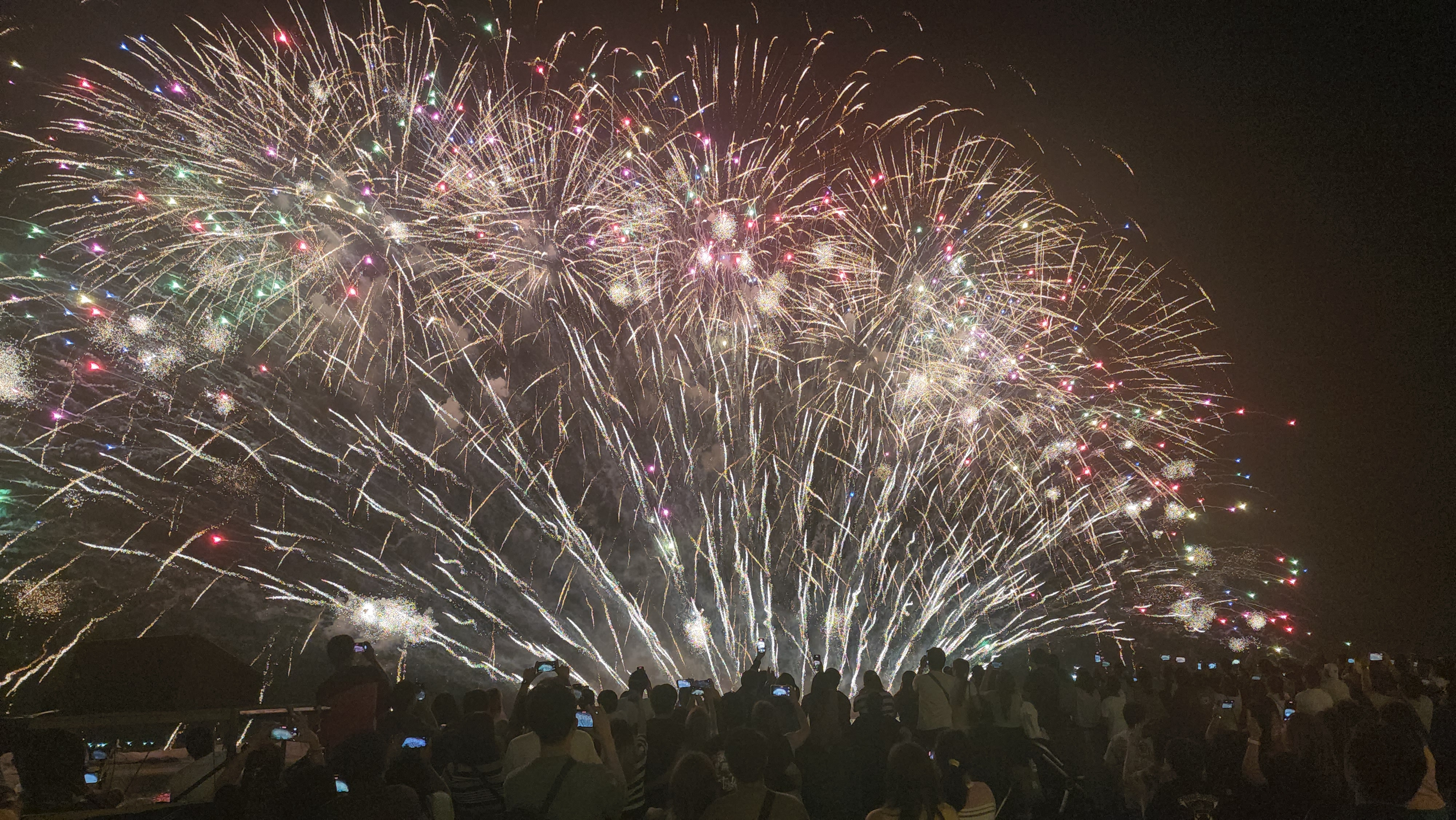
Fireworks display by Polaris Fireworks of China in 2025.

The competition was put on hiatus in 2020 due to the COVID-19 pandemic. The pyromusical was still postponed in 2023 due to the Rehabilitation of the Manila Bay. In March 2024, competition organizers announced its return after a four-year hiatus. With the completion of Manila Bay's rehabilitation, the competition returned to SM Mall of Asia. It was however shortened back to five weeks, and was moved to May−June instead of the usual February−March. Skyglitters Enterprise of Valenzuela City was tapped as co-presenter along with Platinum Fireworks, Inc. The following year, the competition returned to its former schedule, with Platinum Fireworks returning as the sole presenter. Since its 12th edition, the Philippine International Pyromusical Competition has been held on the newly reclaimed land behind SM Mall of Asia, a change from the previous editions which were held on a barge.

Due to unforeseen circumstances, the 13th Philippine International Pyromusical Competition in 2026 was moved to March and April. Subtitled The Magic Above Us, it was originally scheduled for all Saturdays from February 21 to March 21. The performer of February 21 was rescheduled to April 11 alongside the closing. February 28 performers were rescheduled to perform on March 28. The opening exhibition was scrapped and was changed to a special exhibition to take place on March 21 after the designated performer of the said day.

== Participating teams ==
(Host nation highlighted.)

Country	World Pyro Olympics			Philippine International Pyromusical Competition												
Country	2005	2007	2008	2010	2011	2012	2013	2014	2015	2016	2017	2018	2019	2024	2025	2026
Australia	ShowFX Australia			Howards And Sons Pyrotechnics	Fireworkx			Howards And Sons Pyrotechnics		Skylighter Fireworx				Skylighter Fireworx		
Austria												Fire-Events			Steyrfire Feuerwerke	
Belgium													CBF Pyrotechnics			
Brazil									Vision Show							
Canada		Pyro Studios			Apogee Fireworks	Fireworks Spectaculars		Royal Pyrotechnie		Fireworks Spectaculars	Hands Fireworks	Hands Fireworks	Fireworks Spectaculars		Royal Pyrotechnie	Fireworks Spectaculars
Canada		Pyro Studios			Apogee Fireworks	Fireworks Spectaculars		Royal Pyrotechnie		Fireworks Spectaculars	Garden City Display Fireworks	Hands Fireworks	Fireworks Spectaculars		Royal Pyrotechnie	Fireworks Spectaculars
China	Glorious Group			Liuyang Jinsheng Fireworks			Liuyang New Year Fireworks		Polaris Fireworks		Lidu Fireworks	Polaris Fireworks		Liuyang Jinsheng Fireworks	Polaris Fireworks	
China	Glorious Group			Liuyang Jinsheng Fireworks			Liuyang New Year Fireworks		Polaris Fireworks		Polaris Fireworks	Polaris Fireworks		Liuyang Jinsheng Fireworks	Polaris Fireworks	
Denmark		Bright Star Fireworks														
Finland						Oy Pyroman Finland							Oy Pyroman Finland			
France			Fetes & Feux	Brezac Artifices	Lacroix Ruggieri			Brezac Artifices		Brezac Artifices	Pyragic	Pandora-Pyrotechnie	Brezac Artefices		LuxFactory Fireworks	
Germany	Nico Lünig Event							Vulcan Europe		Steffes-Ollig Feurwerke	Nico Events	Steffes-Ollig Feurwerke				
Germany	Nico Lünig Event							Vulcan Europe		Steffes-Ollig Feurwerke	Steffes-Olig Feurwerke	Steffes-Ollig Feurwerke				
Italy			Parente Fireworks			Orzella Fireworks	Ipon Fireworks S.R.L		Martarello Group S.R.L.	Parente Fireworks		Alessi Fuochi Artificiali	Viviano S.R.L.			Martarello Group S.R.L.
Japan				Tamaya Kitahara			Tamaya Kitahara		Akariya Fireworks							
Malaysia				Pyro Splendour Services												
Malta						Malta Fireworks										
Mexico									Sirius Pyrotechnics							
Netherlands						Royal Fireworks			Royal Fireworks					Royal Fireworks		
Philippines	La Mancha Group			Platinum Fireworks										Skyglitters Enterprise	Platinum Fireworks	
Philippines	La Mancha Group			Platinum Fireworks										Platinum Fireworks	Platinum Fireworks	
Portugal					Macedos Pirotecnia	Grupo Luso Pirotecnia			Grupo Luso Pirotecnia				Pirotecnia Minhota	Macedos Pirotecnia		Pirotecnia Minhota
Poland		Astondoa Piroteknia											Surex Firma Rodzinna			
Russia	Orion Art International															
Singapore				Redhub Entertainment												
South Africa	Pyro Spectacular															
South Korea	Hanwha					Woori Fireworks		Hwarang Fireworks						Faseecom Co. Ltd.		
Spain					Pirotecnia Igual	Pirotecnia Turis	Brunchu Pyro Experience									Hermanos Caballer
Sweden									Göteborgs FyrverkeriFabrik							
Switzerland												Sugyp SA				
Taiwan							Yung Feng Fireworks					Yung Feng Fireworks				
United Arab Emirates	Flash Art Group															
United Kingdom	Celtic Fireworks	Westcoast Fireworks		Jubilee Fireworks		SM Art Pyrotechnics	Jubilee Fireworks			Pyrotex Fireworx	Pyro 2000	Pyrotex Fireworx				
United Kingdom	Celtic Fireworks	Westcoast Fireworks		Jubilee Fireworks		SM Art Pyrotechnics	Jubilee Fireworks			Pyrotex Fireworx	Pyrotex Fireworx	Pyrotex Fireworx				
United States	Melrose Pyrotechnics			PyroFire Display				Atlas Pyro Vision		Atlas Pyro Vision		Pyro Engineering			Rozzi Fireworks	
Venezuela			Venefuegos Artificiales													

== Winners ==
World Pyro Olympics
Edition		Winner	1st runner-up	2nd runner-up
1st	2005	ShowFX Australia	None awarded	
2nd	2007	(United Kingdom) Westcoast Fireworks	None awarded	
3rd	2008	(Italy) Parente Fireworks	None awarded	
Philippine International Pyromusical Competition
Edition		Winner	1st runner-up	2nd runner-up
1st	2010	(United Kingdom) Jubilee Fireworks	(Australia) Howards And Sons Pyrotechnics	(Japan) Tamaya Kitahara Fireworks
2nd	2011	(China) Liuyang Jinsheng Fireworks	(United Kingdom) Jubilee Fireworks	(Japan) Tamaya Kitahara Fireworks
3rd	2012	(Canada) Fireworks Spectaculars	(Australia) Skylighter Fireworx	(Netherlands) Royal Fireworks*
3rd	2012	(Canada) Fireworks Spectaculars	Oy Pyroman Finland	(Netherlands) Royal Fireworks*
4th	2013	(United Kingdom) Jubilee Fireworks	(Canada) Fireworks Spectaculars	Oy Pyroman Finland
4th	2013	(United Kingdom) Jubilee Fireworks	(China) Liuyang Jinsheng Fireworks	Oy Pyroman Finland
5th	2014	(Canada) Royal Pyrotechnie	(China) Liuyang New Year Fireworks	(United Kingdom) Jubilee Fireworks
6th	2015	(Netherlands) Royal Fireworks	(China) Liuyang New Year Fireworks	(Portugal) Grupo Luso
7th	2016	(United Kingdom) Pyrotex Fireworx Ltd.	(Germany) Steffes-Ollig Feuerwerk	(China) Polaris Fireworks
8th	2017	(United Kingdom) Pyrotex Fireworx Ltd.	(Germany) Steffes-Ollig Feuerwerk	(China) Polaris Fireworks
9th	2018	(United Kingdom) Pyrotex Fireworx Ltd.	(China) Polaris Fireworks	(Italy) Alessi Fuochi Artificiali
9th	2018	(Germany) Steffes-Ollig Feuerwerk	(China) Polaris Fireworks	(Canada) Hands Fireworks
10th	2019	(China) Polaris Fireworks	(France) Brezac Artifices	(Germany) Steffes-Ollig Feuerwerk
10th	2019	(China) Polaris Fireworks	(United Kingdom) Pyrotex Fireworx Ltd.	(Germany) Steffes-Ollig Feuerwerk
11th	2024	(Germany) Steffes-Ollig Feuerwerk	(Portugal) Macedos Pirotecnico	(United Kingdom) Pyrotex Fireworx Ltd.
12th	2025	(China) Polaris Fireworks	(United Kingdom) Pyrotex Fireworx Ltd.*	(Germany) Steffes-Ollig Feuerwerk
12th	2025	(China) Polaris Fireworks	(United Kingdom) Pyrotex Fireworx Ltd.*	(Canada) Royal Pyrotechnie
13th	2026	(United Kingdom) Pyrotex Fireworx Ltd.*	(China) Polaris Fireworks	(Germany) Steffes-Ollig Feuerwerk

• (*) Also the recipient of the People's Choice Award

== See also ==
- Tourism in Metro Manila
