= Archdiocesan Shrine of Jesus =

- Archdiocesan Shrine of Jesus The Way, The Truth, and The Life
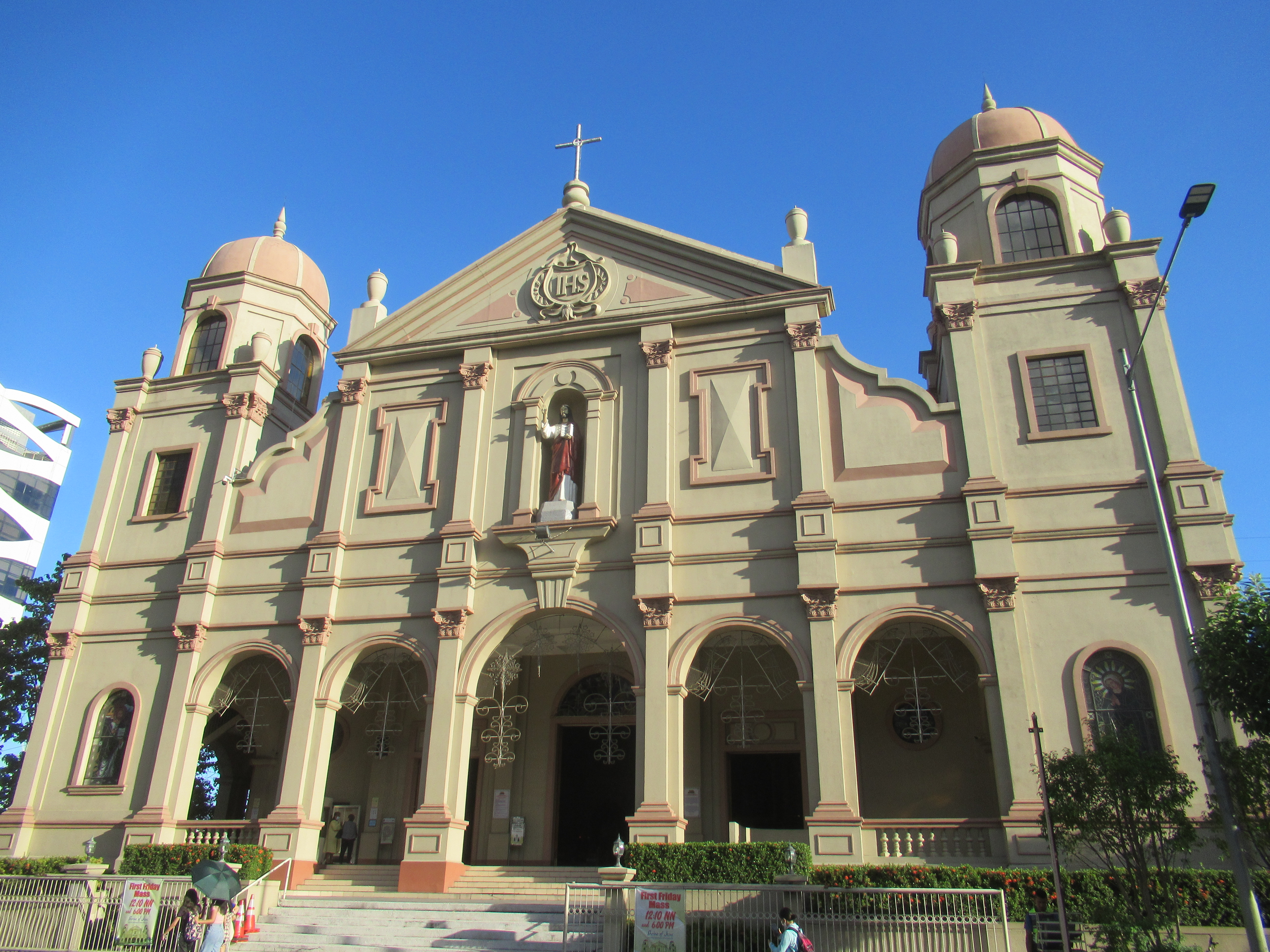
- Archdiocesan Shrine of Jesus
- 14°31′51″N 120°58′56″E
- Address: Coral Way, Central Business Park I-A, Pasay
- Country: Philippines
- Denomination: Roman Catholic
- Website: shrineofjesus.org

History
- Consecrated: July 9, 1999

Architecture
- Architect: Jun Palafox
- Style: Spanish Baroque

Clergy
- Priest: Danny Canceran (Rector)

The Archdiocesan Shrine of Jesus The Way, The Truth, and The Life is a Catholic church at the Mall of Asia complex at the Central Business Park I-A in Pasay, Metro Manila, Philippines

== History ==
The SM Group donated land at the reclaimed Central Business Park I-A (CBP I-A) back in August 1995 for the purpose of establishing a church and a youth center. The latter was proposed by Pope John Paul II during a mass at the Cultural Center of the Philippines Complex as part of the World Youth Day celebrations earlier in January. The church initially had the tentative name of Church of St. Tarcisius and St. Maria Goretti.

Jun Palafox designed the Spanish Baroque-inspired church. Gervasio Amistoso meanwhile is responsible for the interior. The Sy family's Pyramid Construction and Development Group Corporation did the engineering.

It was consecrated and dedicated on July 9, 1999, by Manila Archbishop Jaime Cardinal Sin, with Apostolic Nuncio of the Philippines Archbishop Antonio Franco, Cebu Archbishop Ricardo Cardinal Vidal, and other Philippine-based bishops. The name of the church was after John Paul's characterization of Jesus as "the way, the truth, the life" in his World Youth Day speech. It is the first structure to get built in the CBP I-A.

== Facilities ==
The Archdiocesan Shrine of Jesus is a structure located within the Mall of Asia complex. The John Paul II Center, which was formerly the youth center, is hosted at the basement of the church. It is used to host events.
