= Wing Tai Properties Limited =

Hong Kong property developer

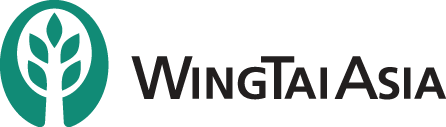
- Formerly: USI Holdings Limited
- Industry: Property development
- Founded: 1991; 34 years ago
- Headquarters: Hong Kong
- Brands: WingTai Asia; Lanson Place

Wing Tai Properties Limited (previously USI Holdings Limited) is a Hong Kong–based property developer, operator of hospitality services and owner of several tailoring factories. Listed on the Hong Kong Stock Exchange from formation in 1991, it operates hotels under the brand names of WingTai Asia and Lanson Place.

== Lanson Place ==
Lanson Place is a wholly owned subsidiary of Wing Tai Properties Limited, currently manages nine properties (four of which Wing Tai has equity in) under the Lanson Place brand, consisting of luxury personal hotels and residences in Hong Kong, Shanghai, Kuala Lumpur, Singapore, Manila, as well as an upcoming property in Melbourne (to be opened in 2024).

== WingTai Asia ==
In July 2007, USI completed a general offer for the issued shares of Winsor Properties Holdings Limited. This rationalized Wing Tai Holdings and USI's shareholding in Winsor Properties, resulting in USI holding an interest of about 80%.

== Tailoring ==
USI's has garment factories in Hong Kong, China and Southeast Asia. It also has garment trading and branded products distribution. They were owners of Gieves & Hawkes, which they divested in 2012.
