= Central Business Park I-A =

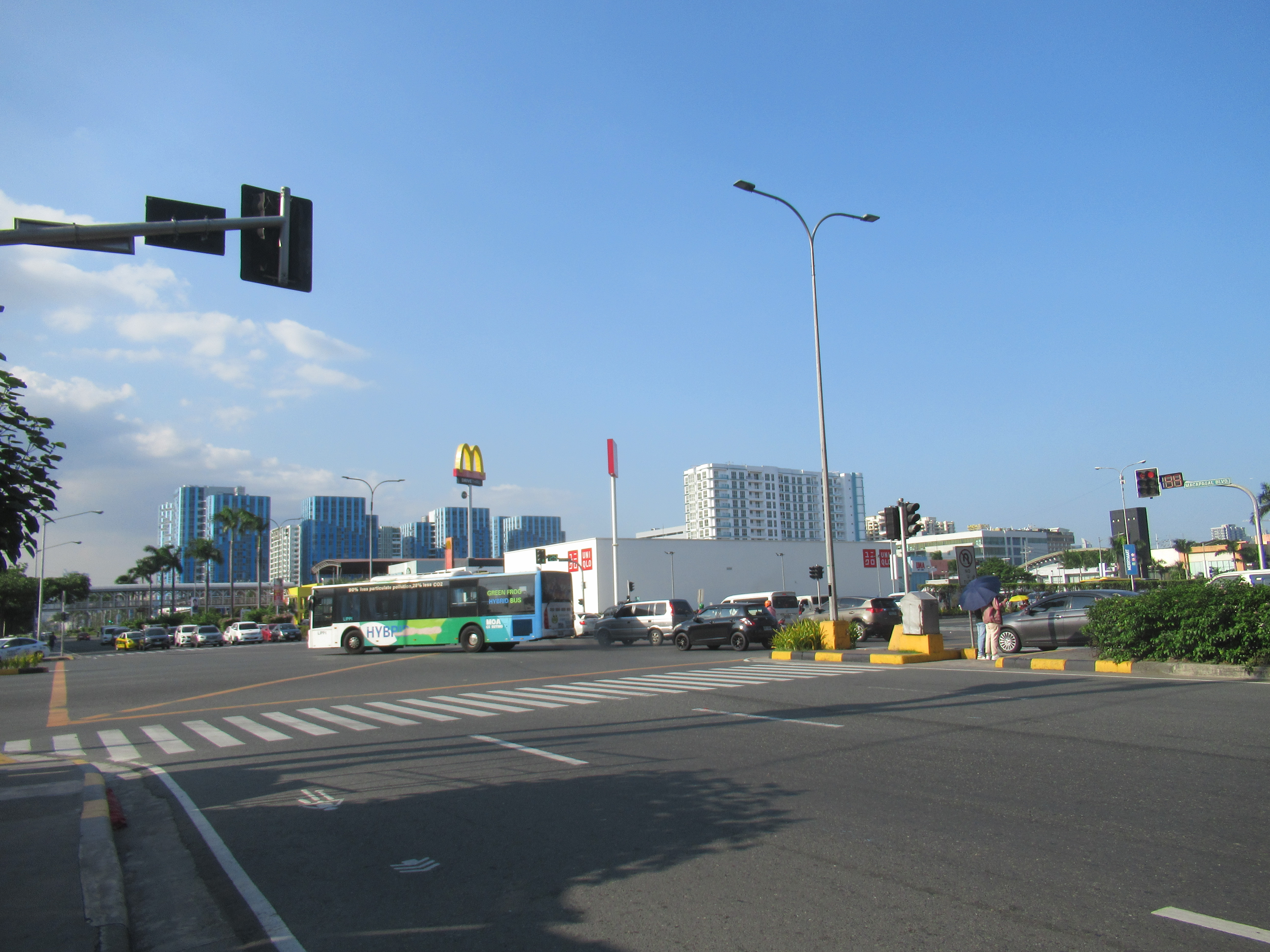
- Blue Bay Walk at CBP I-A

Project
- Developer: SM Prime, Federal Land, and others

Location
- Location in Metro Manila, Philippines
- Coordinates: 14.5369°N 120.9856°E
- Country: Philippines
- Location: Pasay, Metro Manila, Philippines

Area
  - Total: 200 ha (490 acres)

The Central Business Park Island-A (CBP I-A) is a reclaimed area in Pasay, Metro Manila, Philippines.

== History ==
=== 1970s–1990s: Early years ===
The Central Business Park I-A (CBP 1-A) was part of a bigger land reclamation associated with the Manila Bay Coastal Road Project that commenced in 1975. It was a joint project of the Construction and Development Corporation of the Philippines (CDCP; later the Philippine National Construction Corporation or PNCC) and the Philippine government.

In 1995, the reclamation project was assigned to the Public Estates Authority (PEA, now the Philippine Reclamation Authority) was dubbed as "Boulevard 2000". The land reclamation is already above ground with a concave seawall erected. Among the developers with stakes in the area is the SM Group and Federal Land, the real-estate arm of the Metrobank Group.

Construction of the SM Mall of Asia was slated to began in January 1996. However, the project was delayed and reduced in scale amid the country's weak economy.

In 1999, the first structure in CBP I-A, the Shrine of Jesus was opened. The SM Group donated land back in August 1995 where the church was built.

=== 2000s onwards ===
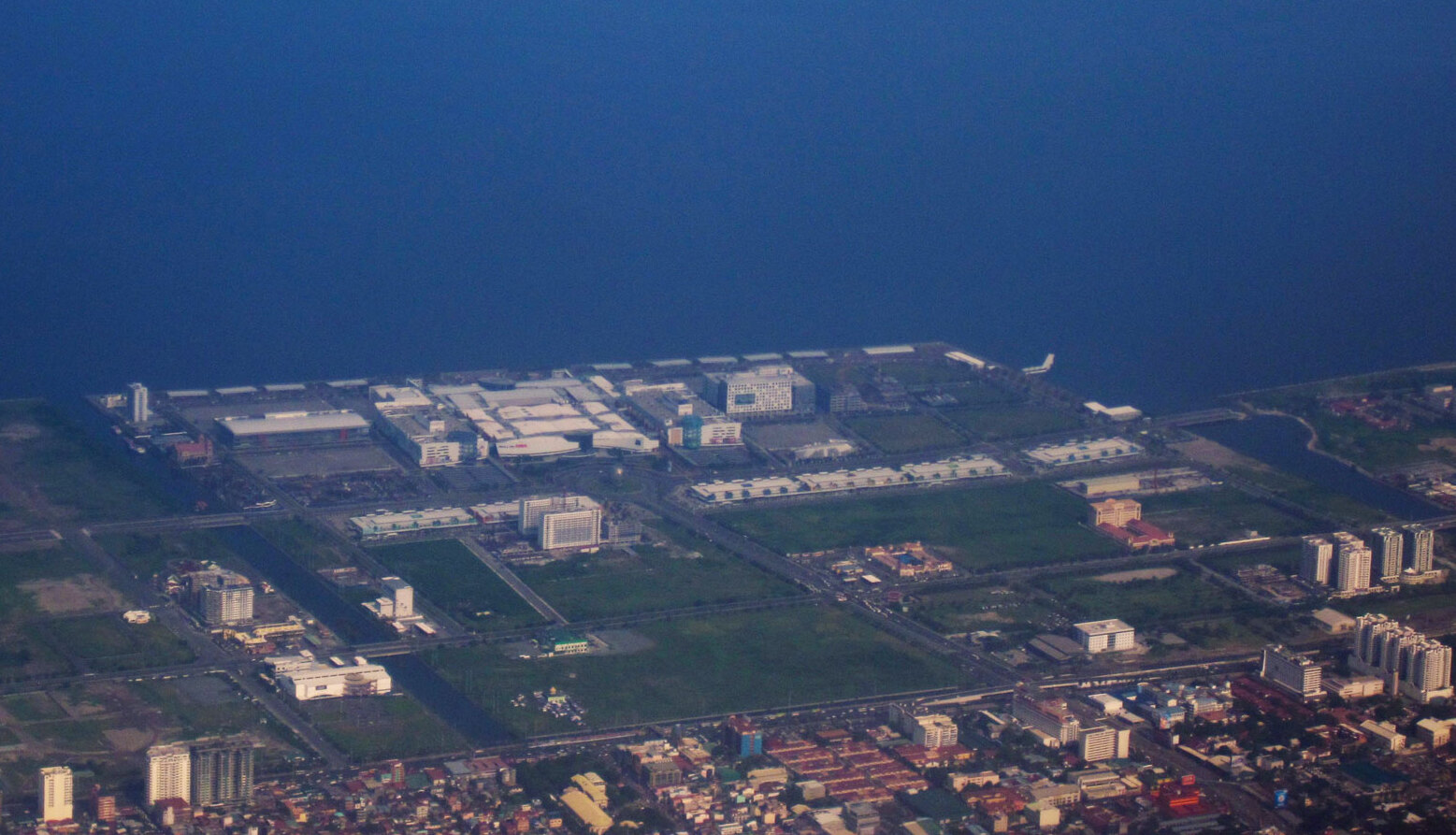
Aerial view of CBP I-A in 2010.

In the early 2000s, Federal Land's Metropolitan Park began to emerge with the construction of the Bay Gardens residential condominium. Also, after delays, construction of the SM Mall of Asia commenced in 2002. The mall opened in 2006.

The SM Group began calling its portion of the CBP I-A as the Mall of Asia Complex in September 2007. In 2008, the first building of the E-Com complex within the MOA Complex opened. The MOA Complex continued to expand in the next decades.

== Geography ==
The Central Business Park I-A (CBP I-A), according to the Philippine Reclamation Authority covers an area of 200 hectares (490 acres) or 2 square kilometers (0.77 sq mi) situated entirely in Pasay. It is bounded by the Redemptorist Channel to the south, which separates CBP I-A from Central Business Park I-B and C in neighboring city of Paranaque. The Libertad Channel lies north of CBP I-A.

CBP I-A is fronted by the Manila Bay to its west. A new reclamation area known as Pasay 360, will be made in this portion.

== Developments ==
=== Mall of Asia Complex ===
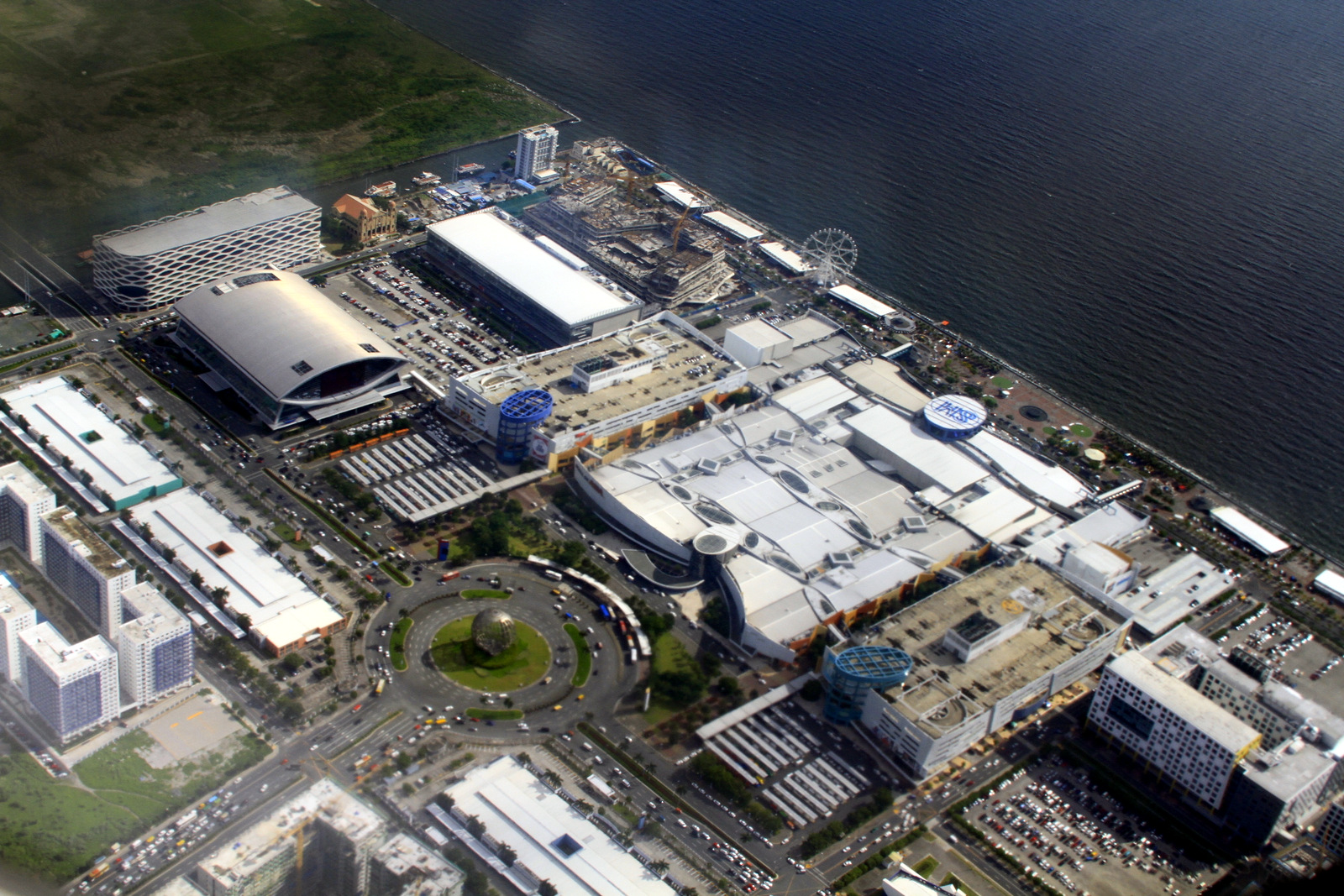
Mall of Asia Complex in 2014.

The Mall of Asia Complex, which included the mall proper, the SM Mall of Asia, is a mixed-used development by the SM Group. It also includes office buildings and hotels. The E-Com Center is office complex with five of its planned six buildings already operational.

=== Met Park ===
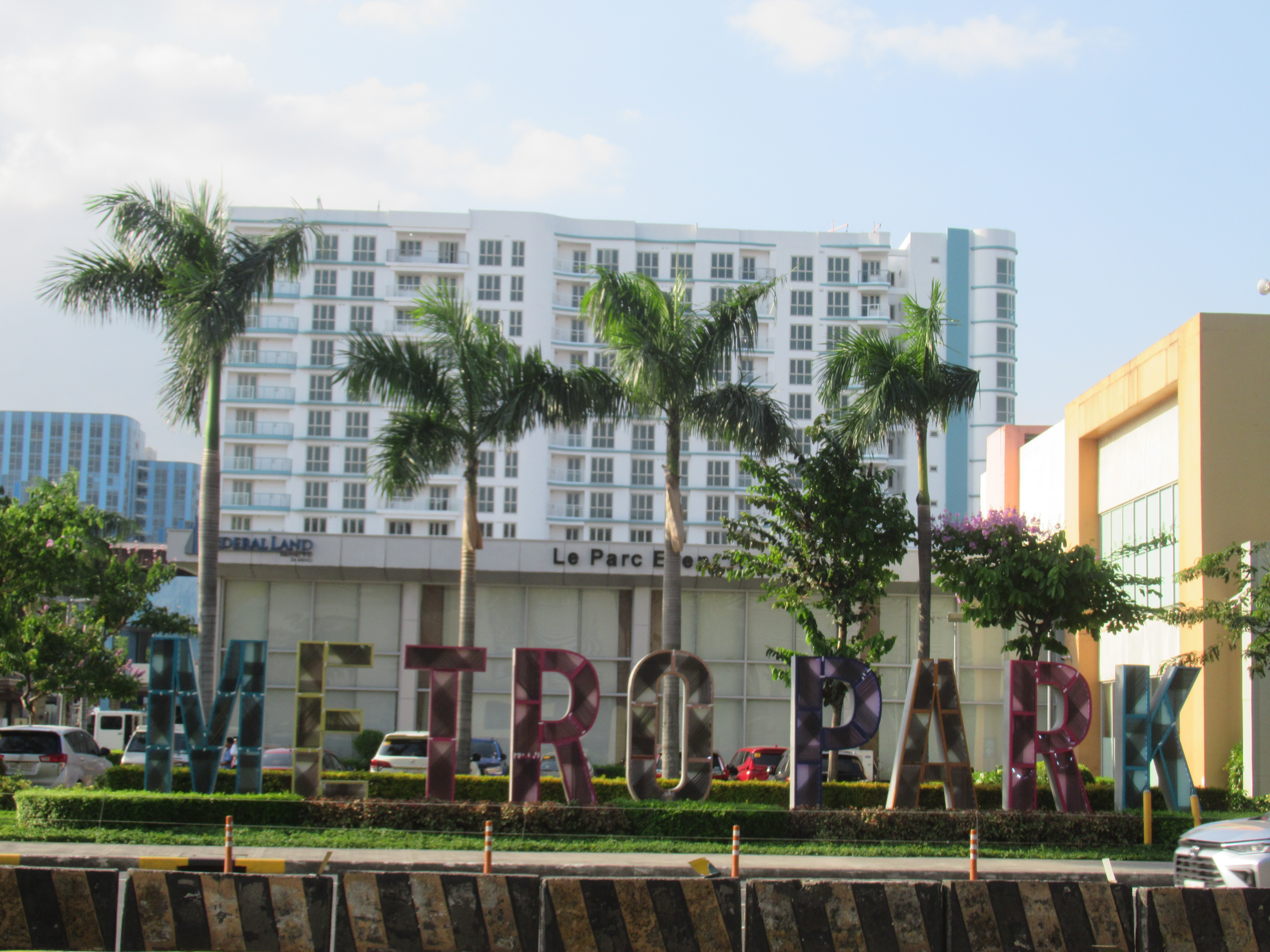
Metro Park signage. 2023

Met Park, formerly the Metropolitan Park, is a 36-hectare (89-acre) mixed-used development by Federal Land within the CBP I-A. It has various condominiums, office buildings, and shopping centers.

The Manila Tytana Colleges (known as the Manila Doctors College until 2011), has a campus within Met Park.

=== DD Meridian Park ===
DD Meridian Park along EDSA Extension in 2023.

The DoubleDragon Meridian Park or DD Meridian Park is a 4.75-hectare (11.7-acre) mixed-use development area by DD-Meridian Park Development Corporation, a REIT joint venture of DoubleDragon Corporation and its partner Carto Meridian Development Corporation.

Prior to 2014, Carto Meridian Development Corporation had already owned the dormant lot (previously an independent parcel area within PRA) along Macapagal Boulevard corner EDSA Extension. DD and Carto Meridian later formed the venture and began developing its own mixed-use area. Construction began in 2015, and formally opened in July 2018. It now houses the DoubleDragon Plaza commercial mall and Hotel 101.

== See also ==
- Aseana City
- South Road Properties in Cebu
