= Metrostar Ferry =

Overview
- Owner: Metrostar Ferry, Inc.
- Locale: Metro Manila and Cavite
- Transit type: Ferry
- Number of lines: 1
- Number of stations: 2

Operation
- Began operation: September 24, 2007
- Number of vehicles: 4

Technical
- System length: 28 km (17.40 mi)

Metrostar Ferry was a passenger ferry service across Manila Bay between Cavite City and Pasay in Metro Manila, Philippines. It is owned and operated by Metrostar Ferry, Inc.

The route operated between terminals in San Roque, at the back of the Cavite City Hall, and SM Mall of Asia, adjacent to the Shrine of Jesus Church, in Bay City. It is serviced by four Filipino-designed ships, the Doña Carmen, Doña Inez, Doña Avelina and Doña Mercedes. Built in 2006, these ships are twin-hull, twin-engine, fully air-conditioned fiberglass catamarans which can carry between 130 and 550 passengers.

The ferry service ran four times a day and makes a crossing in 45 minutes. The single journey cost is ₱75 per person, with a special discount rate of ₱60 for senior citizens and students. The alternative drive from Mall of Asia to Cavite City is approximately two hours via the Manila–Cavite Expressway.

As of 2018, the ferry service is not in operation.

== History ==
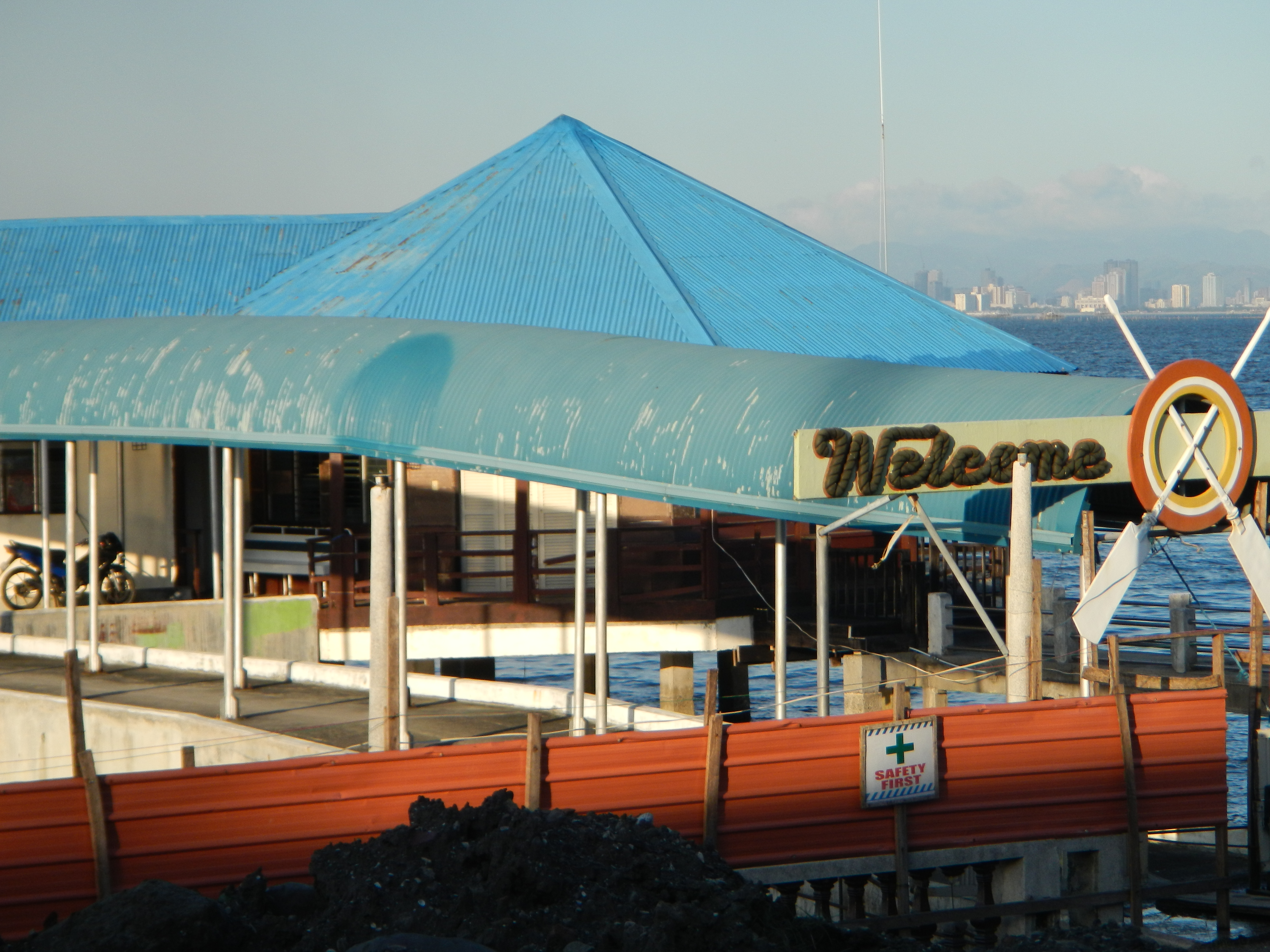
The Metrostar Ferry Cavite Terminal

In 2006, Metrostar Ferry, Inc. secured a ₱135 million loan from the Philippine Export-Import Credit Agency (PhilEXIM) and the state-owned Philippine Veterans Bank to finance the project as part of the government's Manila Bay Transport Project. It purchased Filipino-designed catamarans made by shipbuilders in Navotas and Malabon. Metrostar Ferry made its maiden voyage in July 2007. It was inaugurated on September 24, 2007, by the PhilEXIM.

The company also plans to interconnect with the Pasig River Ferry and open new routes from its Mall of Asia Terminal to Navotas, Bataan (Orion), Bulacan (Hagonoy) and Pampanga (Guagua).

Two ferry boats owned by Metrostar Ferry were destroyed by fire in 2015, while on dock at SM Mall of Asia. The incident was allegedly caused by a spark in one vessel's generator.

== Fleet ==
Metrostar Ferry operated the following vessels (as of December 2012):

- M/V Doña Adelina
- M/V Doña Carmen
- M/V Doña Ines
- M/V Doña Mercedes

== Ferry schedule ==
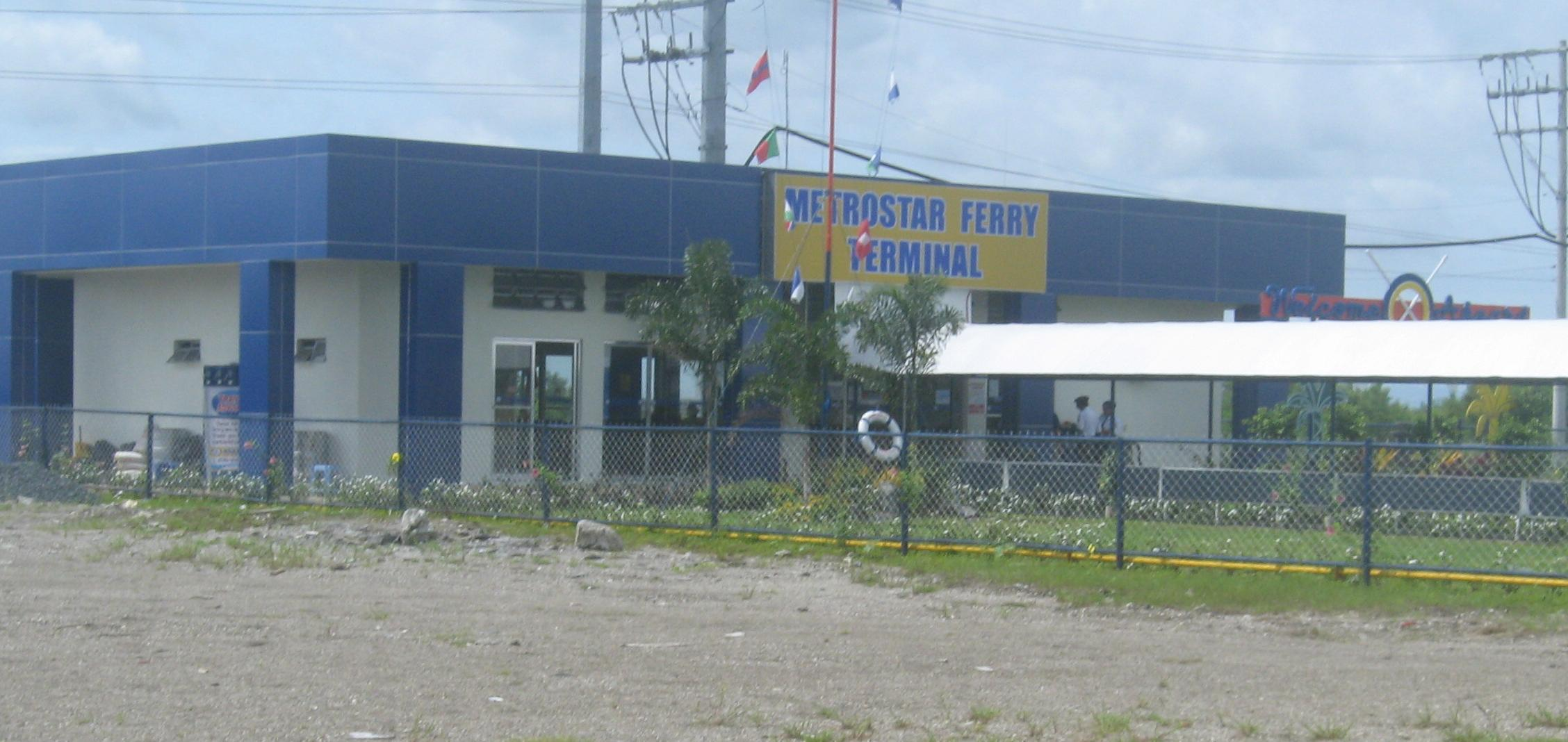
The Metrostar Ferry MOA Terminal

- SM Mall of Asia to Cavite City

07:45 – 08:30
11:00 – 11:45
15:00 – 15:45
18:30 – 19:15

- Cavite City to SM Mall of Asia

06:30 – 07:15
09:30 – 10:15
13:30 – 14:15
16:30 – 17:15
