= Santo Niño, Parañaque =

Barangay in Parañaque, Metro Manila, Philippines

Santo Niño
- Barangay
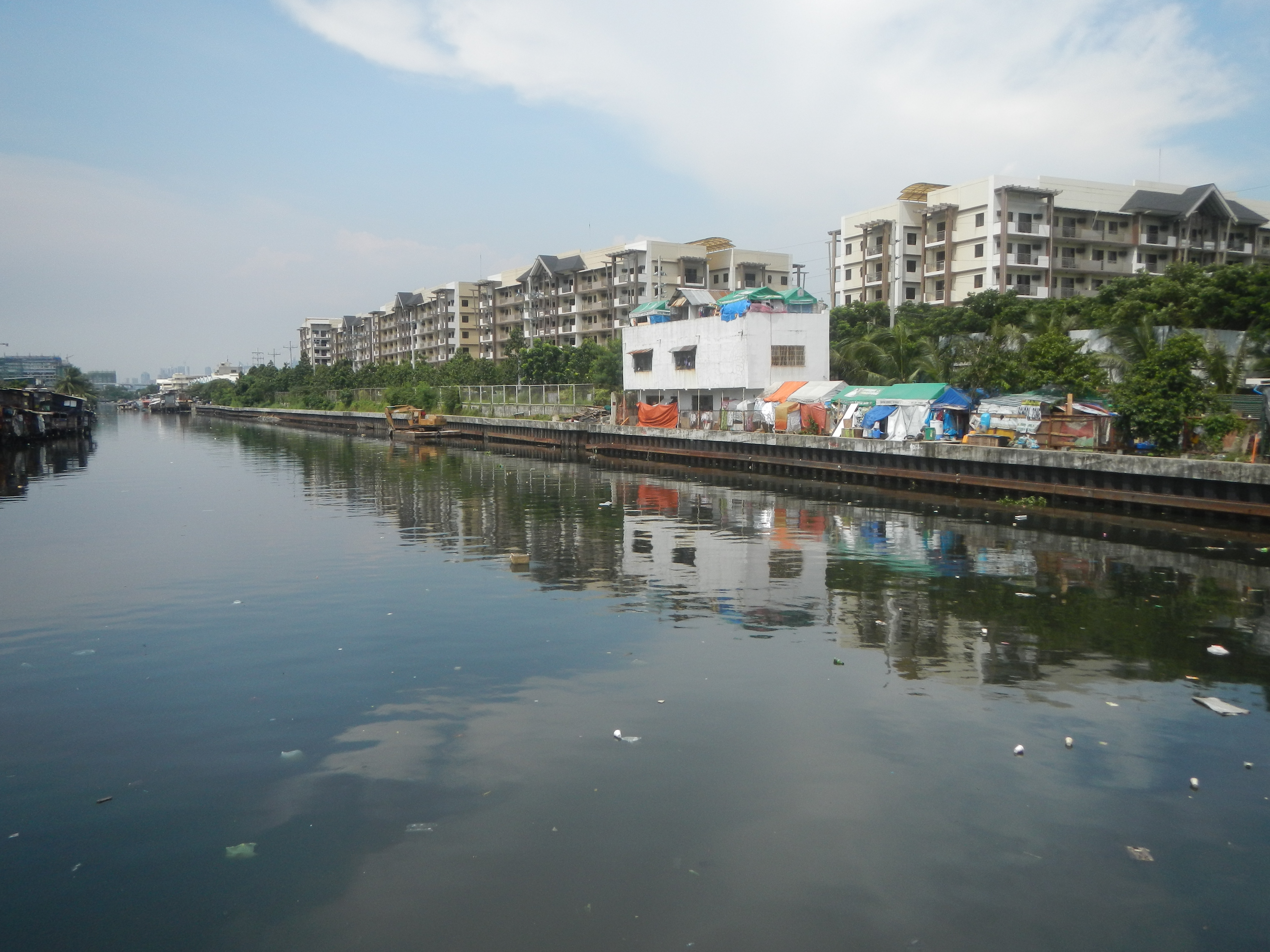
- View from Don Galo

- Location within Metro Manila
- Coordinates: 14°30′12″N 121°0′11″E
- Country: Philippines
- Region: Metro Manila
- City: Parañaque
- Congressional districts: Part of the 1st district of Parañaque

Government
  - Barangay Chairman: Johnny Co

Area
  - Total: 2.4597 km^{2} (0.9497 sq mi)

Population (2020)
  - Total: 28,925
  - Density: 11,760/km^{2} (30,457/sq mi)
- ZIP code: 1704
- Area code: 2

Santo Niño is a barangay located in Parañaque, Metro Manila, Philippines. The barangay surrounds the Ninoy Aquino International Airport on its west and south sides, with a large portion of the barangay extending into the property of the airport grounds to include Terminal 1 as well as the western half of Runway 06/24. The barangay has a total land area of 245.97 hectares (607.8 acres) of which about 55% is occupied by the airport complex. Its population is concentrated in the areas along the Estero de Tripa de Gallina.

Across the Tripa de Gallina to the west are the barangays of Tambo and Don Galo. To the south, it also shares borders with La Huerta along the Parañaque River, and with Moonwalk along the Ibayo Creek (Cañales Creek). Its northern borders are Vitalez, and the Pasay district of Maricaban including Barangay 183 (Villamor Air Base). As of the 2020 census, it had a population of 28,925.

As an "airport village," Santo Niño is a hub for aviation logistics and tourism, serving as the main base of operations for companies such as AAI Group, the Duty Free Philippines, Royal Cargo, and a branch of SPI Global. Retail stores line much of the area of Ninoy Aquino Avenue in the barangay's southern portion, including the Duty Free Fiesta Mall and S&R Membership Shopping Parañaque.

== History ==
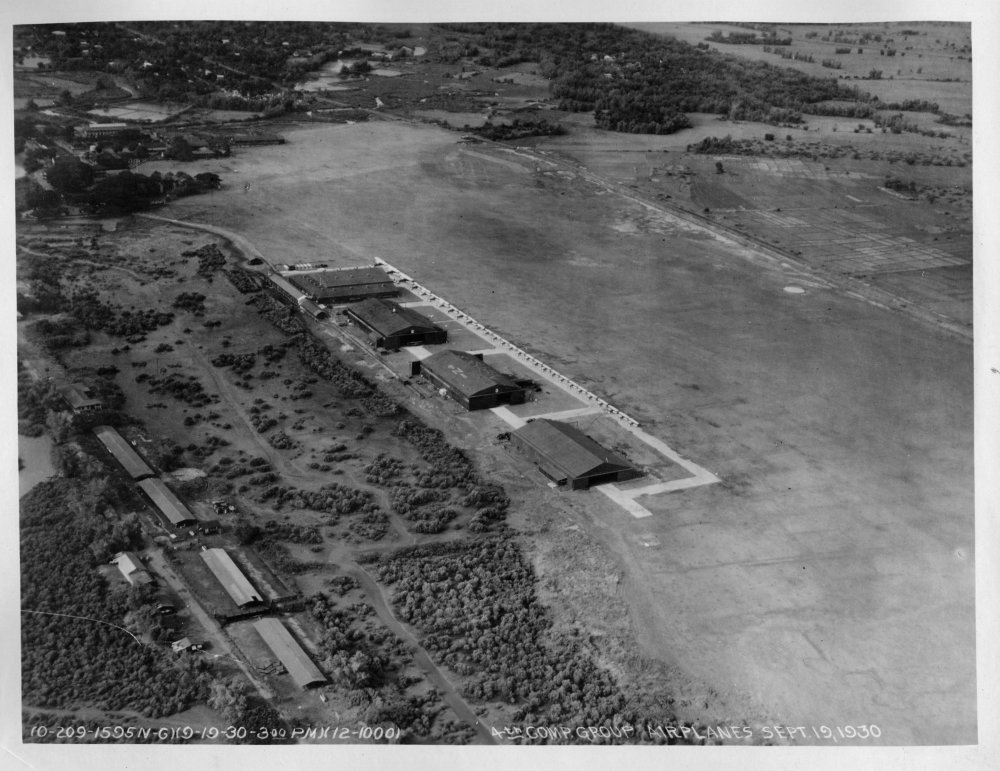
Aerial view of Nichols Field, 1930

Santo Niño was originally known as Ibayo, an old Tagalog word meaning "the opposite side of the river," referring to its location across the Estero de Tripa de Gallina and Parañaque River from populated coastal barrios of Parañaque. It was established as a sitio of Don Galo by the late 17th century, connected only by a bamboo footbridge over the Tripa de Gallina. The sitio remained largely agricultural during the Spanish colonial period containing vast tracts of farmland and swamps stretching as far north as the Estero de Maricaban and east to Malibay (now part of Pasay) and Bicutan (now part of Taguig), forming parts of the 2,544-hectare (6,290-acre) Hacienda de Maricaban belonging to the Order of Saint Augustine. The sitio's original settlers were migrants from Don Galo, La Huerta and San Dionisio, including its pioneers the de León family, followed by the Márquez, Santos, Valenzuela and Cruz families. With the incorporation of Parañaque as a town in the province of Rizal under the American colonial government, Ibayo became a full-fledged barrio and Parañaque's only inland one consisting of four sitios: Dilain, Libro Balagbag, Bundok Mani, and Mataas na Kahoy.

Under American rule, the sitio gree with the purchase of Hacienda de Maricaban by the U.S. government from its owner, Dolores Casal y Ochoa, who only years earlier in 1906 acquired the former friar hacienda. A portion of the hacienda was then transferred to the Manila Railroad Company and a railway line was eventually extended to this barrio towards Cavite, with another line in its eastern portion towards Aloneros in Guinyangan and on to the Bicol Region. In 1919, the Parañaque and Pasay section of the Maricaban estate was transformed into a U.S. Army Air Service camp known as Nichols Field, with the rest of the estate becoming part of the Fort William McKinley reservation. The airfield was eventually converted into an airport in 1948 and became Manila International Airport.

In 1960, Ibayo was officially renamed after the barrio's patron, the Santo Niño de Parañaque. It was converted into a barangay alongside all other barrios in the Philippines in 1974. In 1978, the barangay lost a significant part of its interior territory after two new barangays were created from several gated communities built there after the war. The communities adjacent to Bicutan such as United Parañaque Subdivision (1 to 3), Marian Park and Sitio de Asis were ceded to the new barangay of San Martín de Porres, while its southern communities such as Moonwalk Subdivision, Bricktown Village, and Multinational Village became part of the barangay of Moonwalk. The parish church of Santo Niño was erected in 1995.

== Demographics ==
Year	Population
2007	28,019
2010	28,235
2015	34,860
2020	28,925
2024	33,329

== Education ==
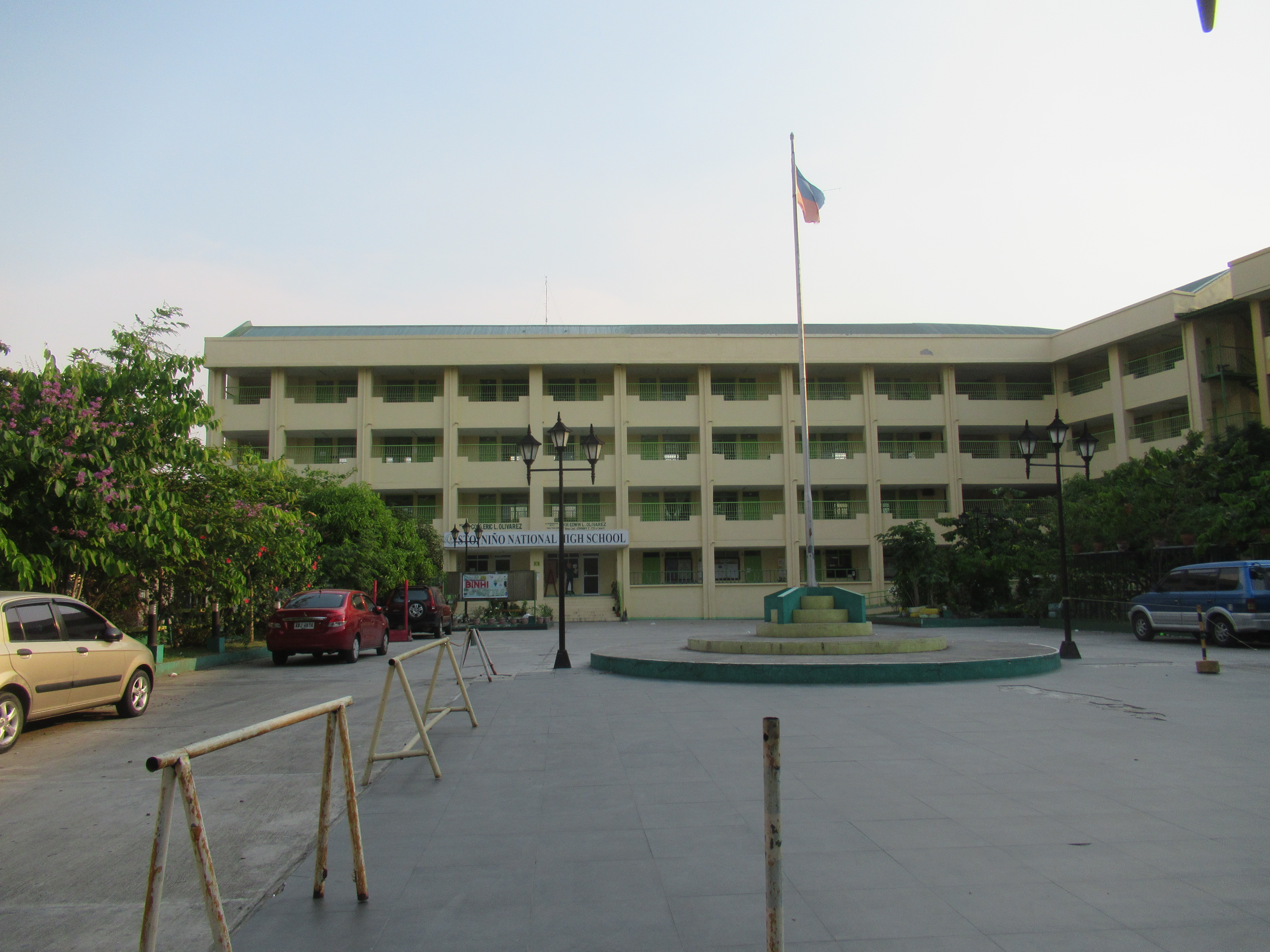
Santo Niño National High School

Santo Niño is home to the following educational institutions:

- Parañaque Science High School
- Polytechnic University of the Philippines Parañaque
- Santo Niño Elementary School
- Santo Niño National High School

== Transportation ==
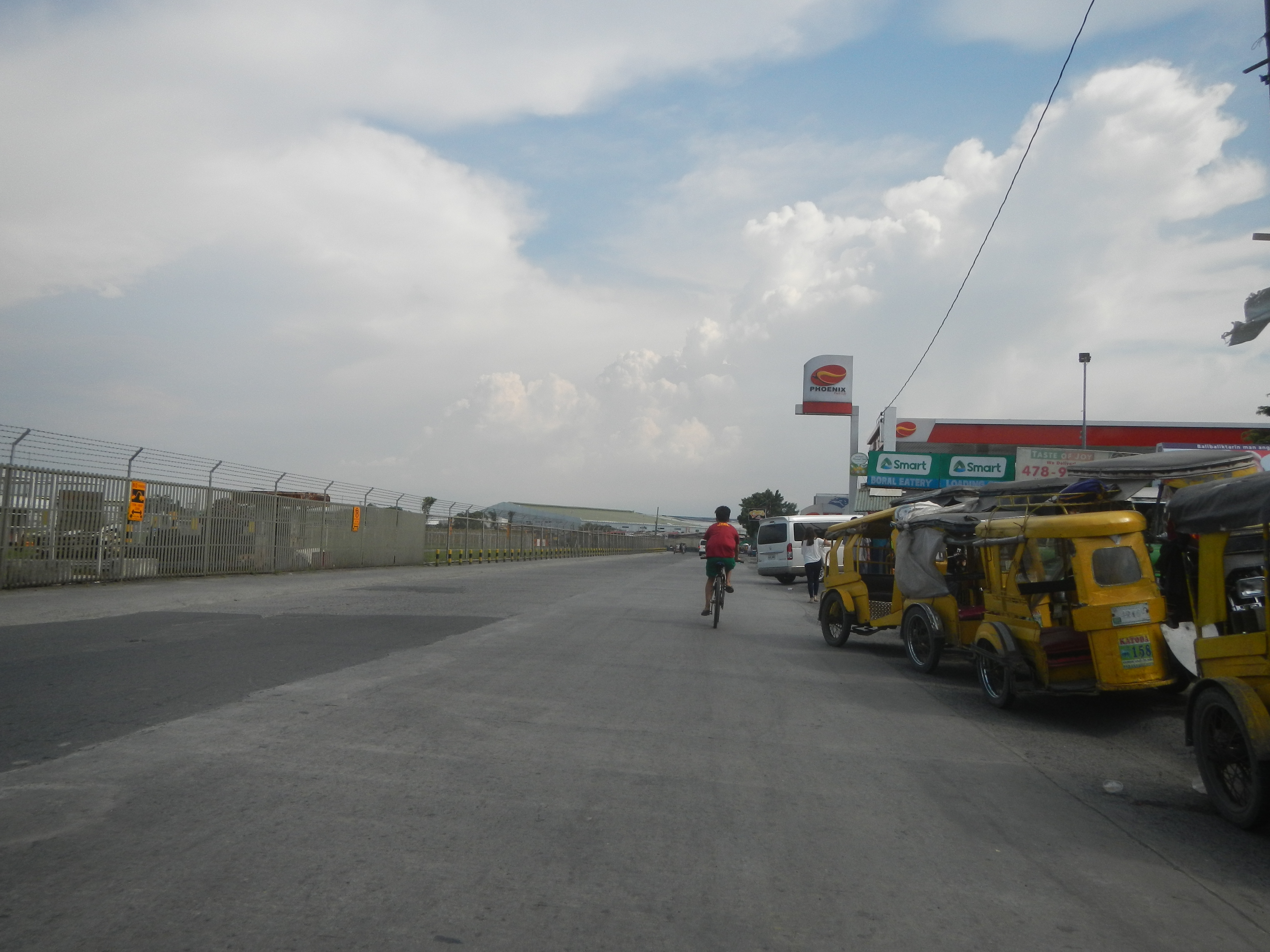
Multinational Avenue along Ninoy Aquino International Airport perimeter fence in Santo Niño

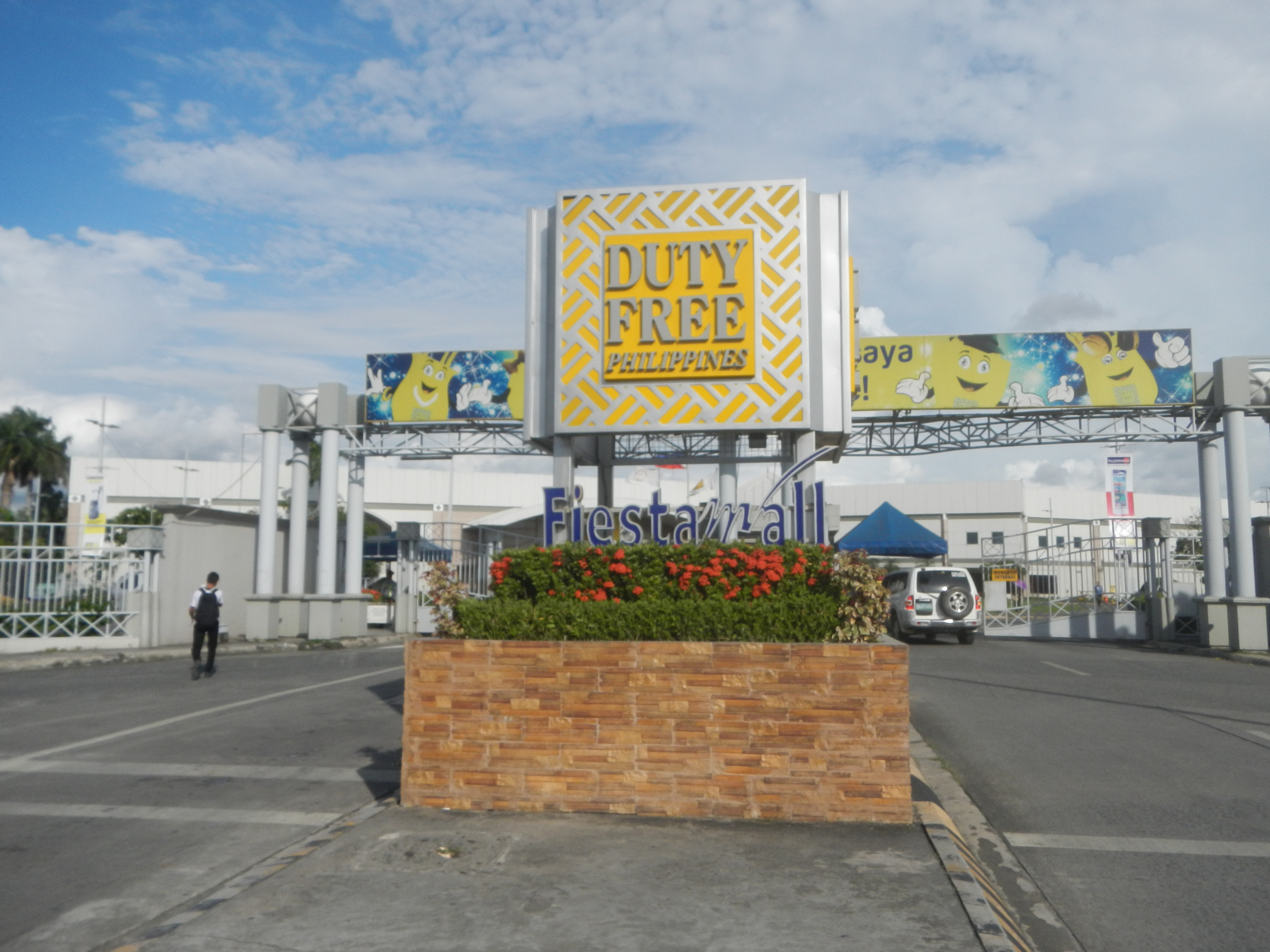
The Duty Free Fiesta Mall on Ninoy Aquino Avenue

The main road in this barangay is Ninoy Aquino Avenue, a national secondary road which runs north–south connecting NAIA Road and Dr. Santos Avenue near the southern perimeter of Ninoy Aquino International Airport. It is connected to the C-5 Road network via Multinational Avenue which runs along Ibayo Creek and to the South Luzon Expressway via Kaingin Road. This area in the southern edges of Santo Niño in close proximity to the main airport runway is home to several other freight and logistics businesses, as well as shanties along the creek which in 2010 was home to 150 informal settler families. The main residential area is crossed by Col. De Leon Street in the west which runs parallel to and midway between Ninoy Aquino Avenue and the Estero de Tripa de Gallina. Its main east–west corridor is Pascor Drive in the north which traverses the area that formerly housed the 11-hectare (27-acre) PAGCOR Casino Filipino Airport complex which closed down in 2014 and which was bought by SM Prime Holdings in 2018. In the south, the barangay is crossed by J.P. Rizal Street which links Ninoy Aquino Avenue to the bridge over the Tripa de Gallina to Don Galo. This street is home to the Santo Niño Parish Church and Santo Niño Barangay Hall, as well as the Ibayo Town Center. The C-5 South Link Expressway will run along its southern limits parallel to the existing C-5 Road.
