= Rico (name) =

Rico is a diminutive of either the Spanish masculine given name Federico or Ricardo, or of the Italian given name Enrico. Rico can also be a nickname or a surname. Notable people with the name include:

== Given name ==
- Rico Abreu (born 1992), American race car driver
- Rico Alaniz (1919–2015), Mexican-American actor
- Rico E. Anderson (born 1968), American actor
- Rico Back (born 1954), German businessman
- Rico Barrera (born 1984), Filipino actor
- Rico Beats, American record executive
- Rico Bell, English artist and musician
- Rico Benatelli (born 1992), German footballer
- Rico Bianchi (1930–2025), Swiss rower
- Rico Blanco (born 1973), Filipino singer-songwriter
- Rico Brizuela (born 1946), Filipino businessman
- Rico Brogna (born 1970), American baseball player
- Rico Capuano, better known as Rico (Scottish singer) (1971–2022), Scottish musician
- Rico Carty (1939–2024), Dominican baseball player
- Rico Chiapparelli, American wrestler
- Rico Conning, British songwriter
- Rico Constantino (born 1961), American wrestler
- Rico Daniels (born 1962), English television presenter
- Rico Dowdle (born 1998), American football player
- Rico Elmer (born 1969), Swiss ski mountaineer
- Rico Engler (born 1987), German footballer
- Rico Fata (born 1980), Canadian ice hockey player
- Rico Flores Jr. (born 2004), American football player
- Rico Freiermuth (born 1958), Swedish bobsledder
- Rico Freimuth (born 1988), German athlete
- Rico Gafford (born 1996), American football player
- Rico Gagliano, American journalist
- Rico Garcia (born 1994), American baseball player
- Rico Gathers (born 1994), American football player
- Rico Gatson (born 1966), American multidisciplinary artist
- Rico Gear (born 1978), New Zealand rugby union player
- Rico Glagla (born 1974), German athlete
- Rico Gulda (born 1968), Austrian classical pianist and conductor
- Rico Harris (born 1977), American basketball player and missing person
- Rico Henry (born 1997), English footballer
- Rico Hill (born 1977), American basketball player
- Rico Hines (born 1978), American basketball coach
- Rico Hizon (born 1966), Filipino broadcaster
- Rico Hoye (born 1974), American boxer
- Rico Krahnert, German former figure skater
- Rico Lebrun (1900–1964), American-Italian painter
- Rico Lieder (born 1971), German sprinter
- Rico Lins (born 1955), Brazilian graphic designer
- Rico Love (born 1982), American singer-songwriter
- Rico Mack (born 1971), American football player
- Rico Maierhofer (born 1985), Filipino basketball player
- Rico Malvar (born 1957), Brazilian engineer
- Rico Mascariñas (born 1953), Filipino chess player
- Rico McCoy (born 1987), American football player
- Rico Meinel (born 1974), German ski jumper
- Rico Morack (born 1988), German footballer
- Rico Murray (born 1988), American football player
- Rico Noel (born 1989), American baseball player
- Rico Oller (born 1958), American politician
- Rico Payton (born 1999), American football player
- Rico Peter (born 1983), Swiss bobsledder
- Rico Petrocelli (born 1943), American former baseball manager
- Rico Pontvianne (1943–2018), Mexican basketball player
- Rico Preißinger (born 1996), German footballer
- Rico Puhlmann (1934–1996), German fashion photographer
- Rico E. Puno, Filipino technocrat
- Rico J. Puno (1953–2018), Filipino singer
- Rico Ramos (born 1987), American boxer
- Rico Reese (born 1983), American football player
- Rico Rex (born 1976), German former figure skater
- Rico Richardson (born 1991), American football player
- Rico Robles (born 1980), Filipino disc jockey
- Rico Rodriguez (actor) (born 1998), American actor
- Rico Rodriguez (musician) (1934–2015), Jamaican ska and reggae trombonist
- Rico Rogers (born 1978), New Zealand cyclist
- Rico Roman (born 1981), American ice hockey player
- Rico Rossi (ice hockey) (born 1965), Italian ice hockey player
- Rico Rossi (musician), American hip hop artist
- Rico Rossy (born 1964), American baseball player
- Rico Saccani (born 1952), American conductor
- Rico Schmider (born 1991), German footballer
- Rico Schmitt (born 1968), German footballer
- Rico Seith (born 1994), German singer
- Rico Simpson (born 2005), New Zealand rugby union player
- Rico Smith (born 1969), American former football player
- Rico Steinmann (born 1967), German footballer
- Rico Strieder (born 1992), German footballer
- Rico Suave (wrestler) (born 1970), Puerto Rican wrestler
- Rico Tampatty (born 1964), Indonesian actor
- Rico Tan (born 1978), Canadian boxer
- Rico Tice (born 1966), Spanish-Anglican writer
- Rico Tomaso (1898–1985), American illustrator
- Rico Verhoeven (born 1989), Dutch kickboxer
- Rico Villasenor, American musician
- Rico Vonck (born 1987), Dutch former darts player
- Rico Washington (born 1978), American baseball player
- Rico Wolven (born 1990), Dutch footballer
- Rico Yan (1975–2002), Filipino matinee idol
- Rico Zeegers (born 2000), Dutch footballer
- Rico Zuccaro (born 1942), American baseball umpire
- Rico Zulkarnain (born 1989), Welsh football player

== Surname ==
- Antonio Rico (1908–1988), Spanish chess player
- Art Rico (1895–1919), American baseball player
- Efraím Rico (born 1967), Colombian road cyclist
- Fred Rico (born 1944), American baseball player
- Isidro Rico (born 1961), Mexican marathon runner
- Loly Rico (21st century), Salvadoran-Canadian activist
- Martin Rico (1833–1908), Spanish painter
- Sergio Rico (born 1993), Spanish footballer

== Fictional characters ==
- Juan Rico, a character from Starship Troopers, renamed John Rico for the movie
- Rico Banderas, a character in the video game Xenogears
- Rico Dredd, a character from the comic Judge Dredd
- Judge Rico, a different character from Judge Dredd
- Rico (Gunslinger Girl), a character in the anime Gunslinger Girl
- Rico Suave (character), in the Disney TV series Hannah Montana
- Rico (Madagascar), a penguin character from the animated Madagascar franchise
- Ricardo Tubbs, a police detective in the TV series and film Miami Vice
- Rico Rodriguez, the protagonist of the Just Cause video game series

== See also ==
- Rick (given name)
- Riko, given name
