= Tambo River =

Tambo River may refer to:

- Parañaque River, Philippines
- Tambo River (Peru)
- Tambo River (Victoria), Australia
