= Don Galo Bridge =

Bridge in Metro Manila, Philippines

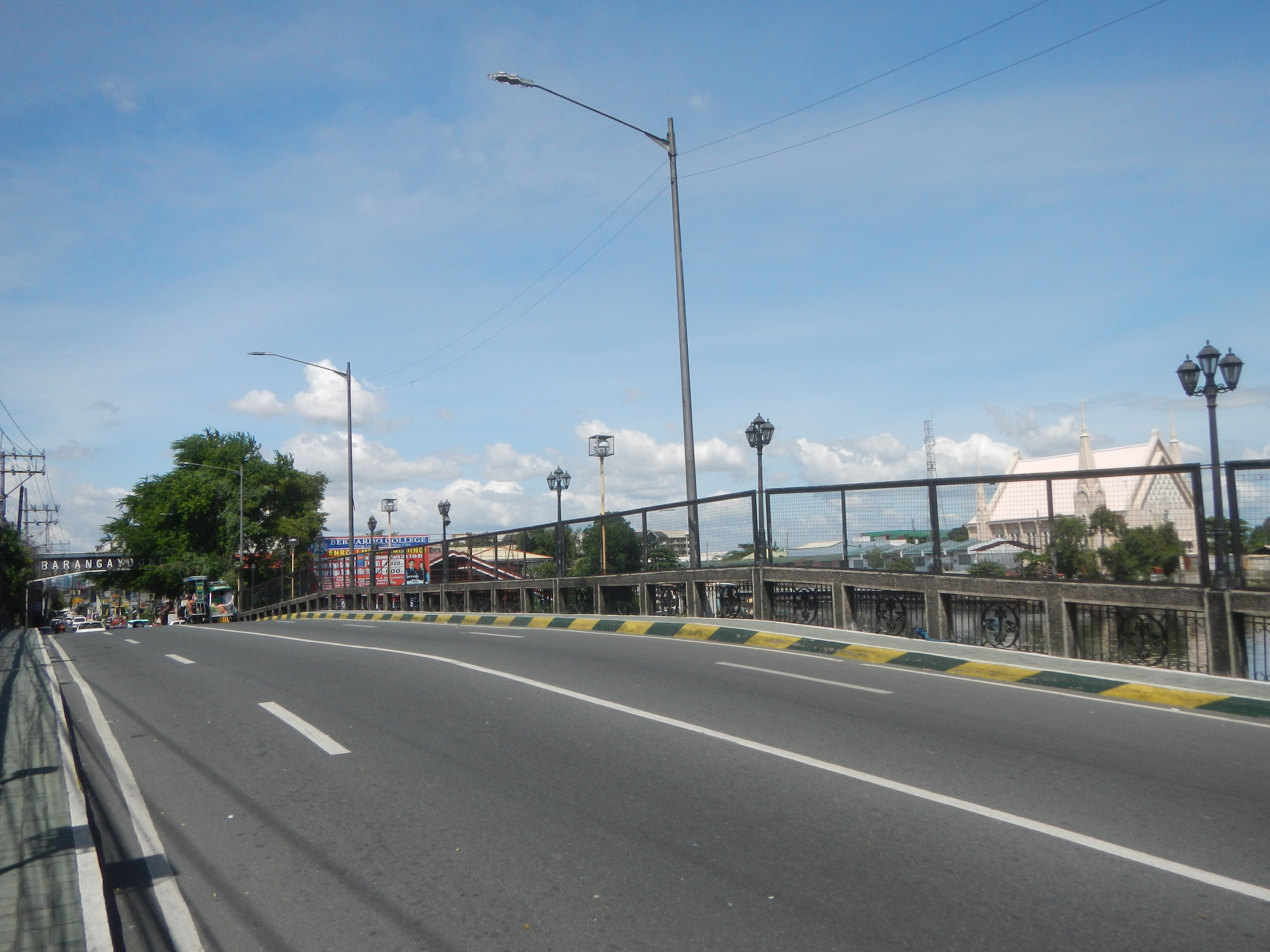
- Coordinates: 14°30′07.9″N 120°59′34.1″E
- Carries: Vehicular traffic and pedestrians
- Crosses: Parañaque River
- Locale: Parañaque City
- Official name: Don Galo Bridge
- Other name(s): Don Galo–La Huerta Bridge; La Huerta Bridge
- Maintained by: Department of Public Works and Highways

Characteristics
- Design: Concrete deck structure
- Material: Concrete (formerly wood, bamboo)
- No. of lanes: 4

Location
- Interactive map of Don Galo Bridge

The Don Galo Bridge, historically known as Parañaque Bridge, Harrisson Bridge, and Don Galo–La Huerta Bridge, is a four-lane road bridge in Parañaque City, Metro Manila, Philippines. Located along the Quirino Avenue, it crosses the Parañaque River, and connects Barangay Don Galo to Barangay La Huerta of Parañaque City.

== History ==
=== Early forms and Spanish colonial era ===
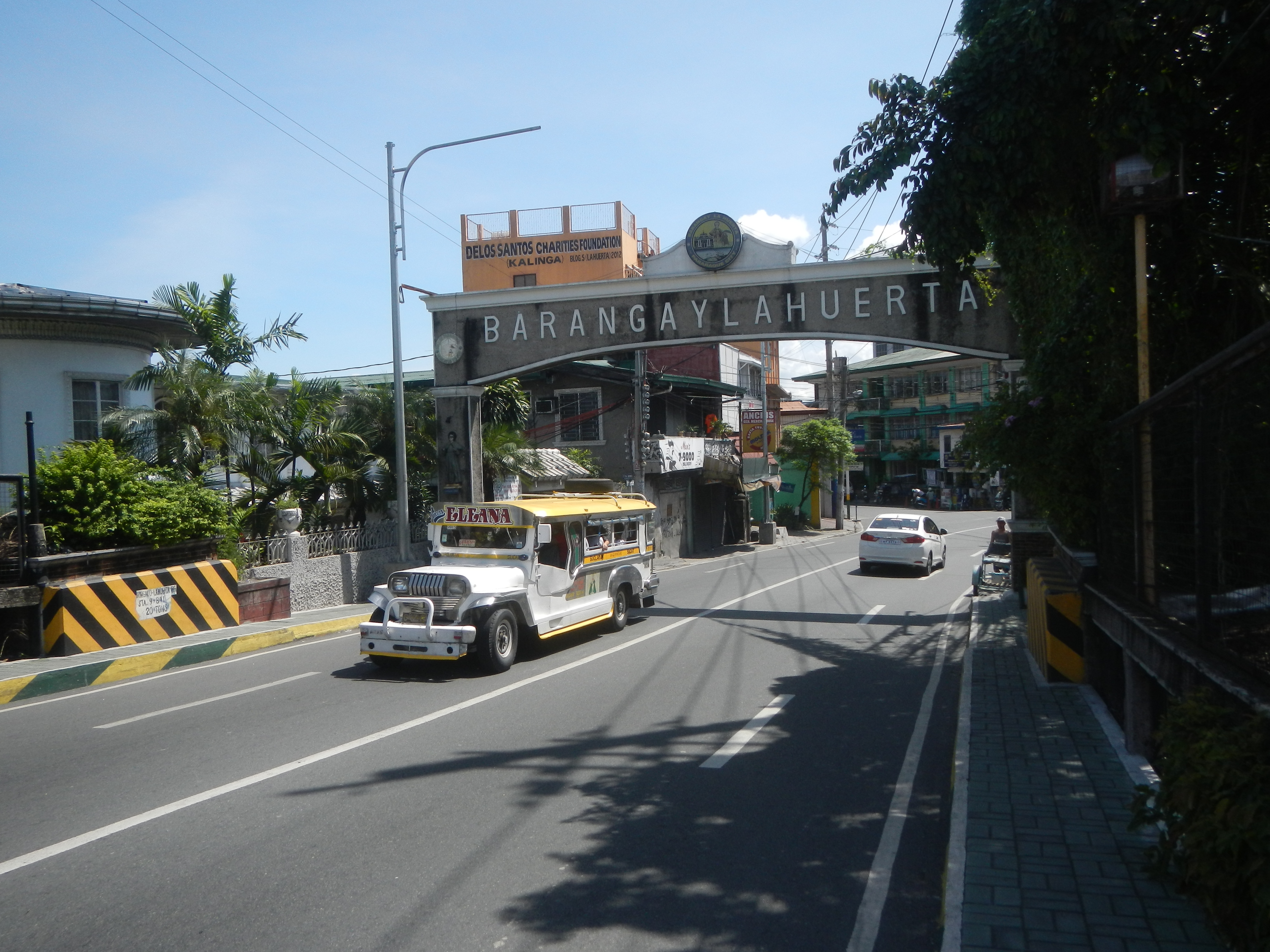
Sign/welcome arch of Barangay La Huerta

Before the 20th century, the river crossing existed in various rudimentary forms, including a narrow bamboo structure that served as a critical connection between Manila and the southern coastal towns of Cavite.

During the Philippine–American War in 1899, the original bridge was deemed a strategic bottleneck. Unprecedented heavy rainfall and flooding swept away the structure, temporarily cutting off military communications between American garrisons in Imus and Bacoor and the headquarters in Manila.

=== American colonial era and early 20th-century rebuilds ===
In 1900, American military engineers led by John Clifford Brown designed a 232-foot (71 m) timber pile trestle bridge constructed from native wood. However, due to its proximity to the tidal waters of Manila Bay, marine wood-boring worms (shipworms) completely destroyed the wooden piles within three years, forcing authorities to temporarily substitute the structure with a three-banca ferry platform in early 1903.

Because of recurring repairs on the wooden structures, a stone and concrete bridge was constructed at the site around 1905 under the American colonial administration. During the American period, the crossing was also referred to as the Harrisson Bridge aside from its original name Parañaque Bridge. At the time of its early 20th-century construction, both the town and the bridge stood nearly adjacent to the beach of Manila Bay, though subsequent coastal reclamation gradually pushed the shoreline several hundred meters westward.

=== World War II (1942–1945) ===
In 1942, Japanese soldiers established heavy garrisons along the bridgehead.

During the Battle of Manila on February 4–5, 1945, the 511th Parachute Infantry Regiment of the U.S. 11th Airborne Division was pinned down at the Parañaque Bridge by intense enemy machine-gun fire. Colonel Irvin R. Schimmelpfennig, Chief of Staff of the division, was killed near the bridgehead while reconnoitering for a bypass route around the river. Concentrated fire from the 511th prevented Japanese forces from detonating demolition charges placed under the bridge, preserving the structure for advancing Allied units.

=== Modern bridge ===
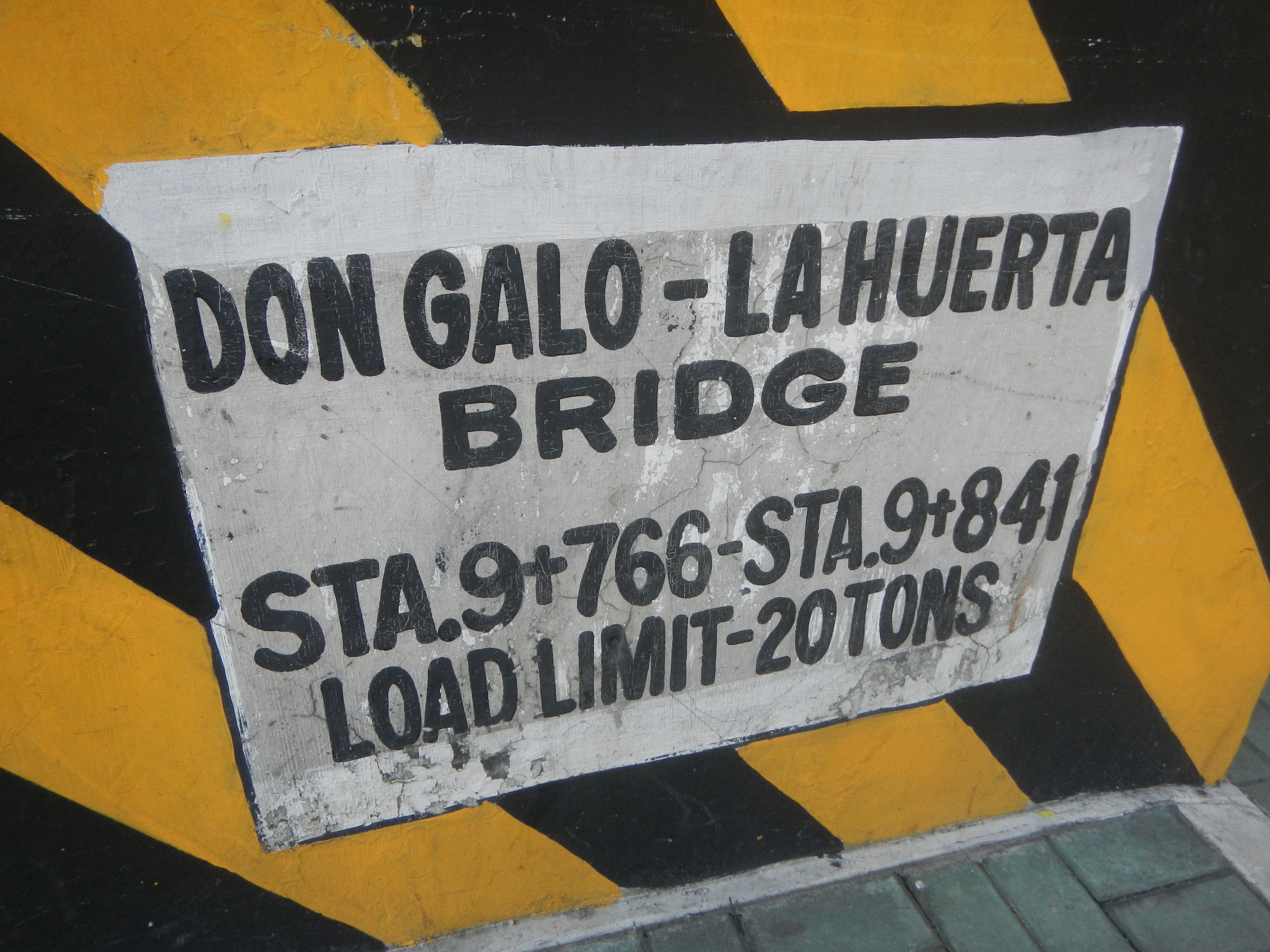
Bridge's identification marker in 2017

By the early 2000s, after nearly a century of continuous service, the aging structure underwent major structural retrofitting and reconstruction under the Department of Public Works and Highways (DPWH). The bridge was called the Don Galo–La Huerta Bridge.

The prolonged construction caused severe local traffic gridlock along Quirino Avenue, resulted to public protests from local residents, commuters, and business owners in early 2004 regarding delays in completing the replacement bridge. A temporary detour structure was utilized before the modernized concrete bridge was fully opened to public traffic, which was later named officially as the Don Galo Bridge.

== See also ==
- Battle of Manila (1945)
- Don Galo
- La Huerta, Parañaque
- Parañaque River
- Quirino Avenue
