= Don Galo =

Barangay in Parañaque, Metro Manila, Philippines

- Barangay
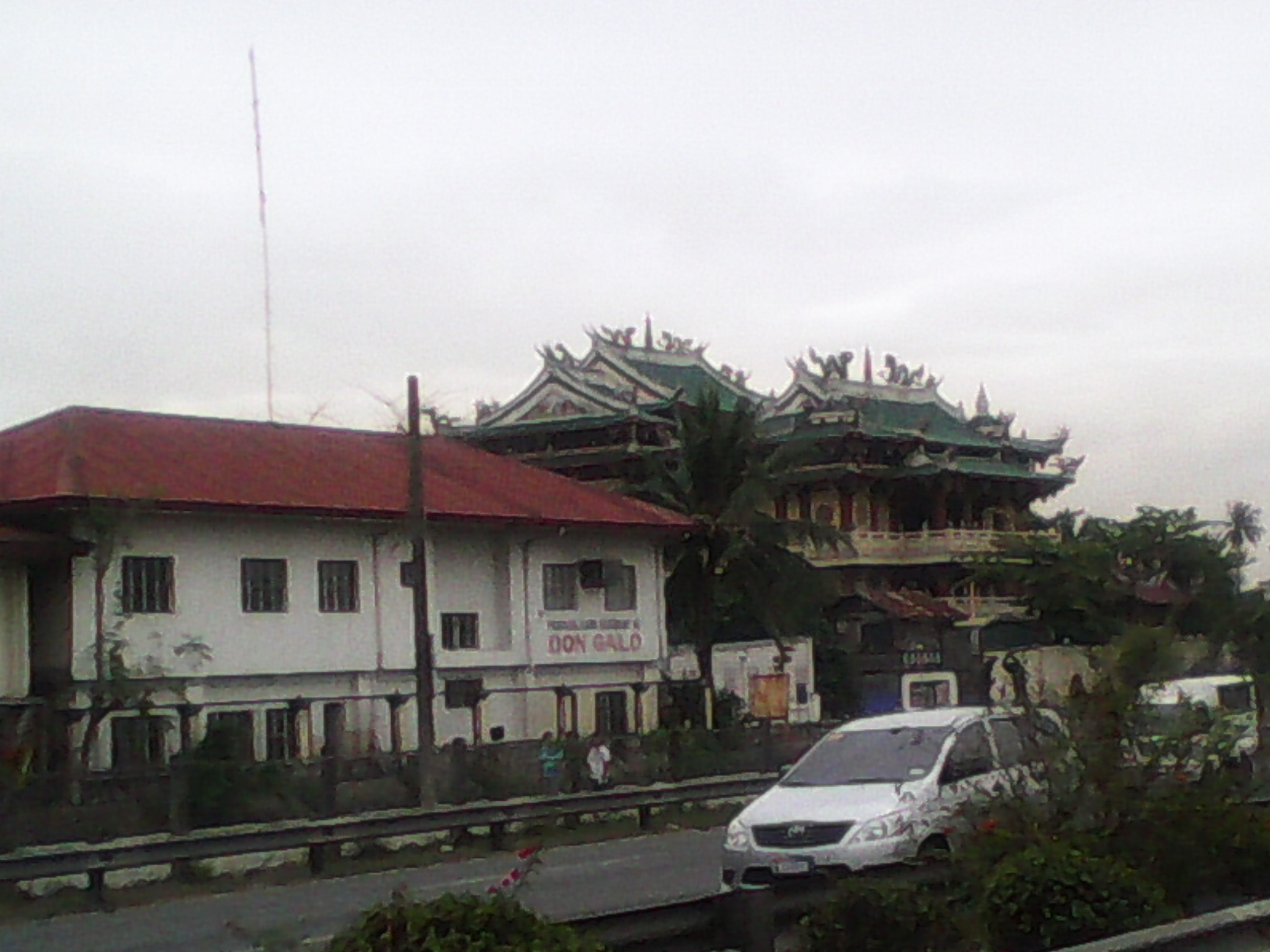
- View of the barangay hall and the Kiu Pat Liong Shiao Temple from the Manila–Cavite Expressway
- Interactive map of Don Galo
- Location within Metro Manila
- Coordinates: 14°30′26″N 120°59′4″E
- Country: Philippines
- Region: Metro Manila
- City: Parañaque
- Congressional districts: Part of the 1st district of Parañaque

Government
  - Barangay Chairman: Marilyn Factor Burgos

Area
  - Total: 0.2322 km^{2} (0.0897 sq mi)

Population (2024)
  - Total: 12,397
  - Density: 53,390/km^{2} (138,300/sq mi)
- ZIP code: 1700
- Area code: 2

Don Galo, also historically known as Dongalo (and erroneously as Longalo and Tungalo), is a barangay in Parañaque, Metro Manila, Philippines. It is located along the north bank of the Parañaque River by its mouth in Manila Bay. It is located directly west of the barangay of Santo Niño (former Ibayo), separated from it by the Estero de Tripa de Gallina stream, and between Tambo to the north and the Parañaque poblacion of La Huerta to the south. The barangay also includes the southernmost section of Bay City, including portions of the Asia World subdistrict such as Entertainment City and Marina Bay.

Don Galo is home to the Parañaque Fisherman's Wharf, also known as the Bulungan Market, a wholesale coastal fish market where fish catch are sold to the highest bidder by "whispering" of prices. It is also the location of a Taoist temple known as the Kiu Pat Liong Shiao Temple, a prominent landmark along the Manila–Cavite Expressway. As of the 2024 census, it had a population of 12,397.

== History ==
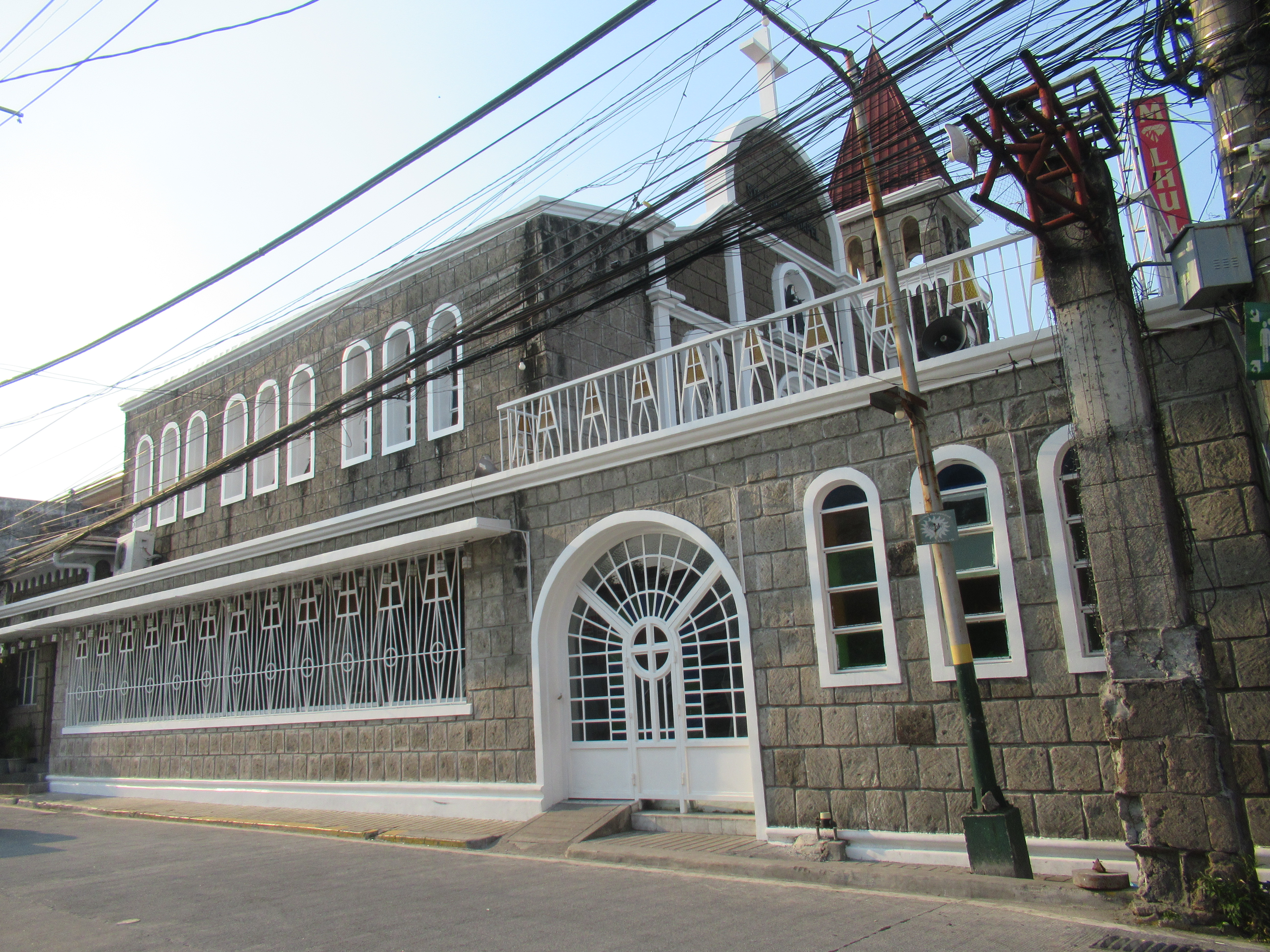
Saint Monica of Hippo chapel built in the 17th century

The barangay was originally known as Santa Monica, and was named for the barrio's patroness whose image is enshrined in the Santa Monica chapel on Santa Monica Street originally built in the 17th century. It takes its present name from a local hero of the Red Sea incident during the 1574 Battle of Manila, so named for the blood of invaders that spilled on it on November 30, 1574. The man, known simply as Galo, was said to have led his barrio folks in a successful effort to stop the advance of invading forces led by the Chinese pirate Limahong. The man was knighted by the Spanish colonial government in Manila for his heroism and was granted the title of "Don" after leading his barrio folks against the pirates.

From a traditional fishing village occupying a narrow strip of land on an estuary leading to Manila Bay, Don Galo now covers a total land area of 23.22 hectares (57.4 acres) through land reclamation in the 1970s and 1980s. The Asia World subdistrict, part of the Boulevard 2000 project initiated by the Philippine Reclamation Authority in 1977, added 200 hectares (490 acres) of land to Parañaque now shared between Don Galo and Tambo. The Manila–Cavite Expressway, also built on reclaimed land in the foreshore area of Don Galo, Tambo, La Huerta and San Dionisio, was opened in 1985. The national government appropriated 2.3 hectares (5.7 acres) of these reclaimed lands in Don Galo for socialized housing in 2005.

A monument commemorating the 1574 Battle of Manila with the statues of Don Galo and Limahong was unveiled at Don Galo Park in 2012.

In July 2026, Don Galo officially expanded its boundary westward into the Bay City reclamation area, after voters ratified City Ordinance No. 2023-19 that implements a straight-line boundary approach. It now includes the Marina Bay residential development.

== Demographics ==
| Year | Population |
|---|---|
| 2007 | 9,106 |
| 2010 | 10,827 |
| 2015 | 11,645 |
| 2020 | 10,550 |
| 2024 | 12,397 |

== Education ==
The barangay is home to the following institutions:

- Don Galo Elementary School
- God's Heritage Christian Academy
- Parañaque National High School (Don Galo Annex)

== Transportation ==
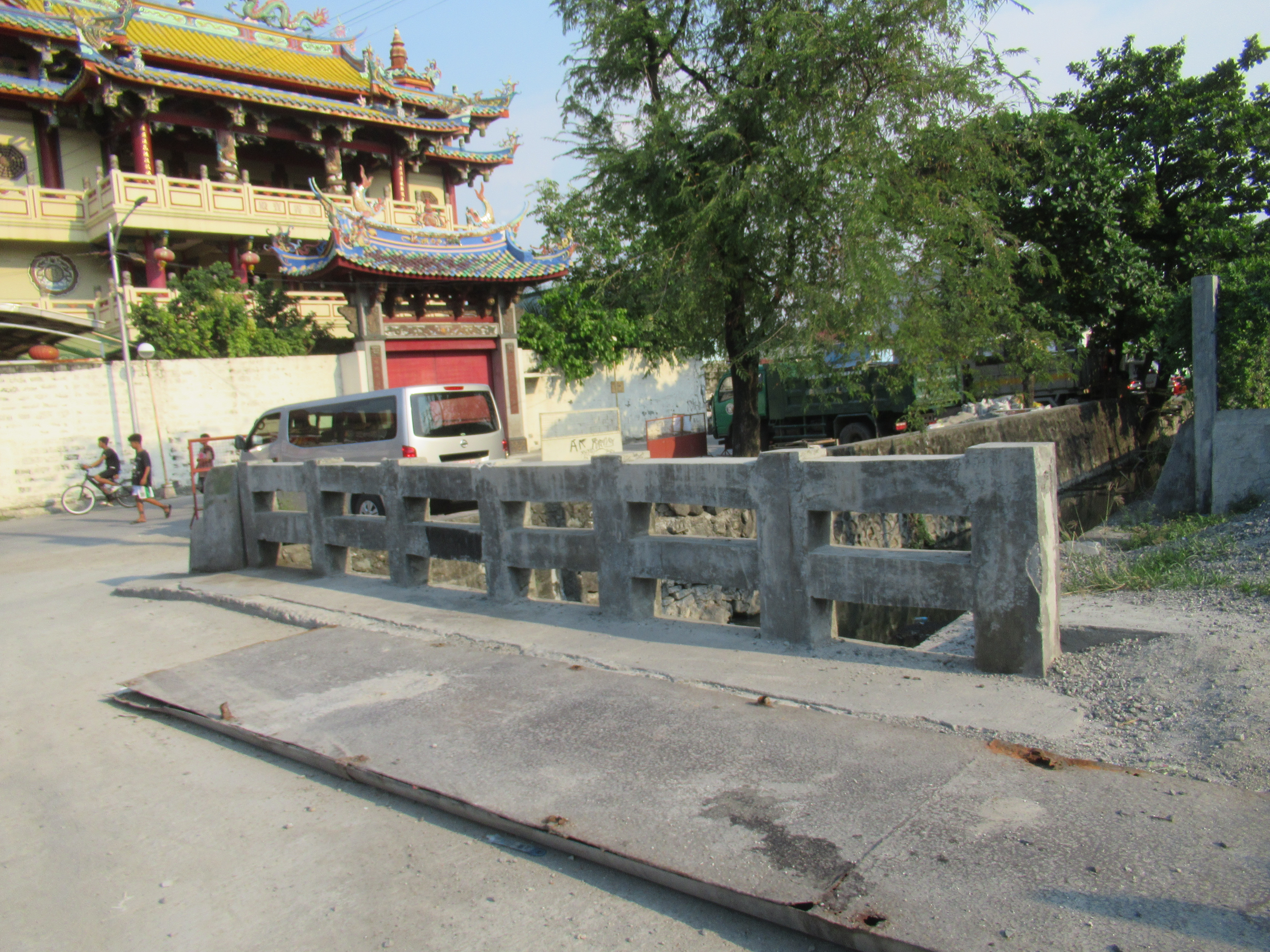
Don Galo Bridge and Estero de Tripa de Gallina

Don Galo is traversed by Elpidio Quirino Avenue on its eastern section which serves as its main street connecting it to La Huerta to the south via the Don Galo–La Huerta Bridge over the Parañaque River and Tambo and Baclaran to the north. Along its western section runs the Manila–Cavite Expressway where the LRT-1 extension to Cavite runs along it. The barangay is connected to its Bay City extension via a narrow road crossing under the Manila–Cavite Expressway called Enrique Factoran Road. It connects to Pacific Avenue which serves as the main east–west street of Marina Bay barangay and which is also linked to the expressway via a flyover interchange constructed in 2018. Macapagal Boulevard starts at its junction with Pacific Avenue and links Don Galo to the Mall of Asia complex in Pasay.

== Gallery ==
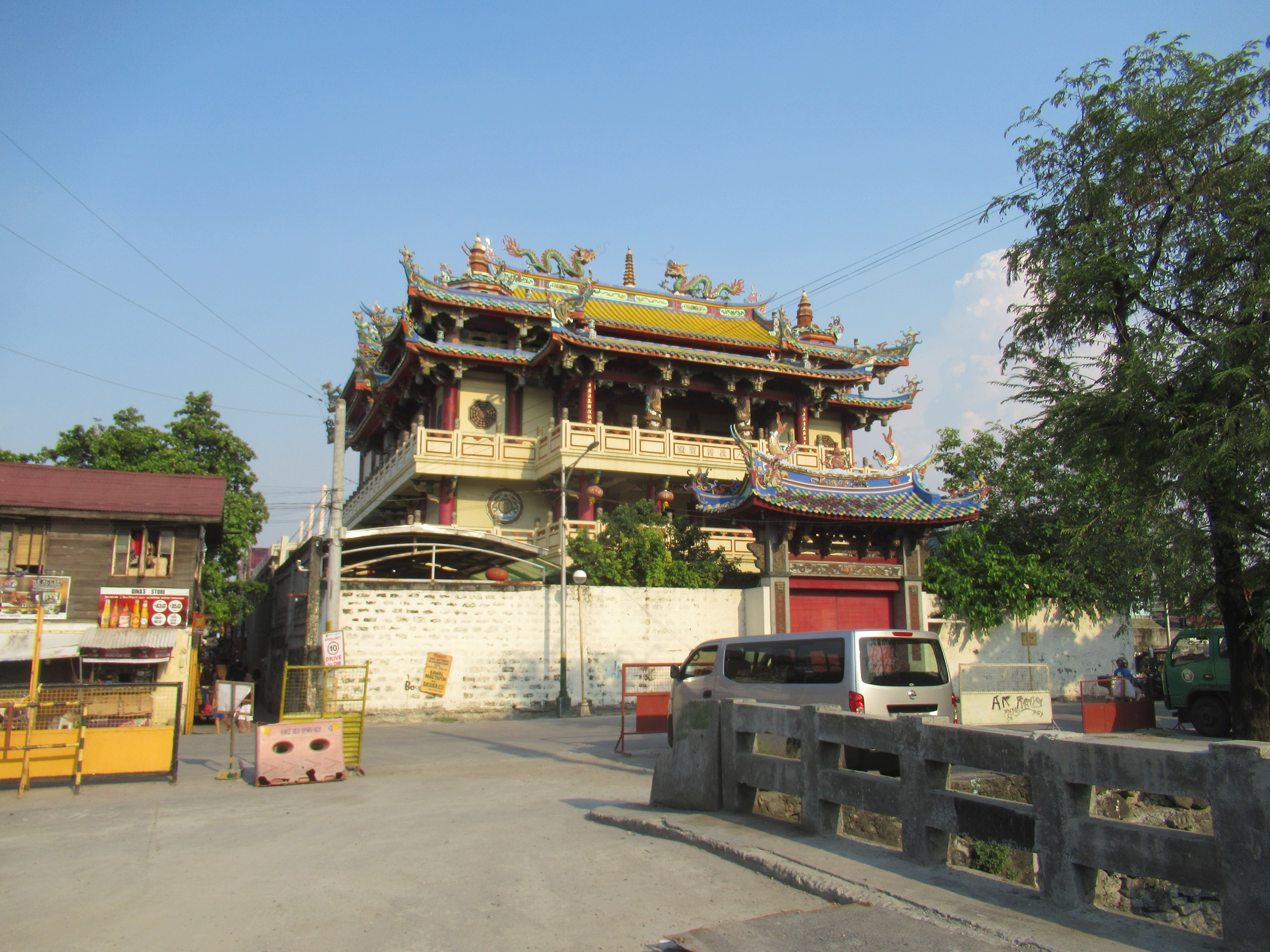
Kiu-Pat Long-Shiao Temple (九八凌霄, Jiu Ba Ling Xiao)

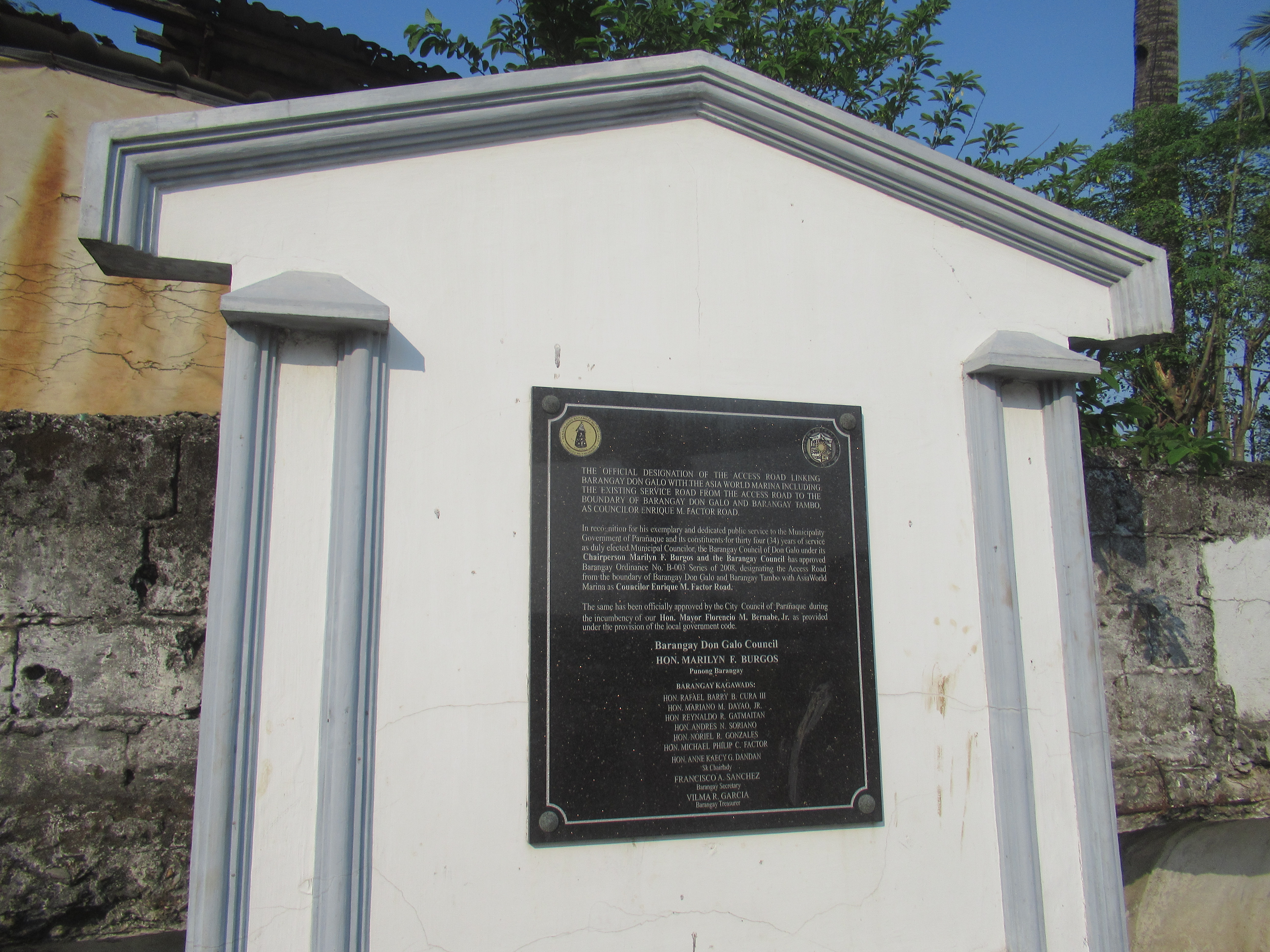
Councilor Enrique M. Factor road historical marker and monument
