= Tambo, Parañaque =

Barangay in Parañaque, Metro Manila, Philippines

Tambo
- Barangay
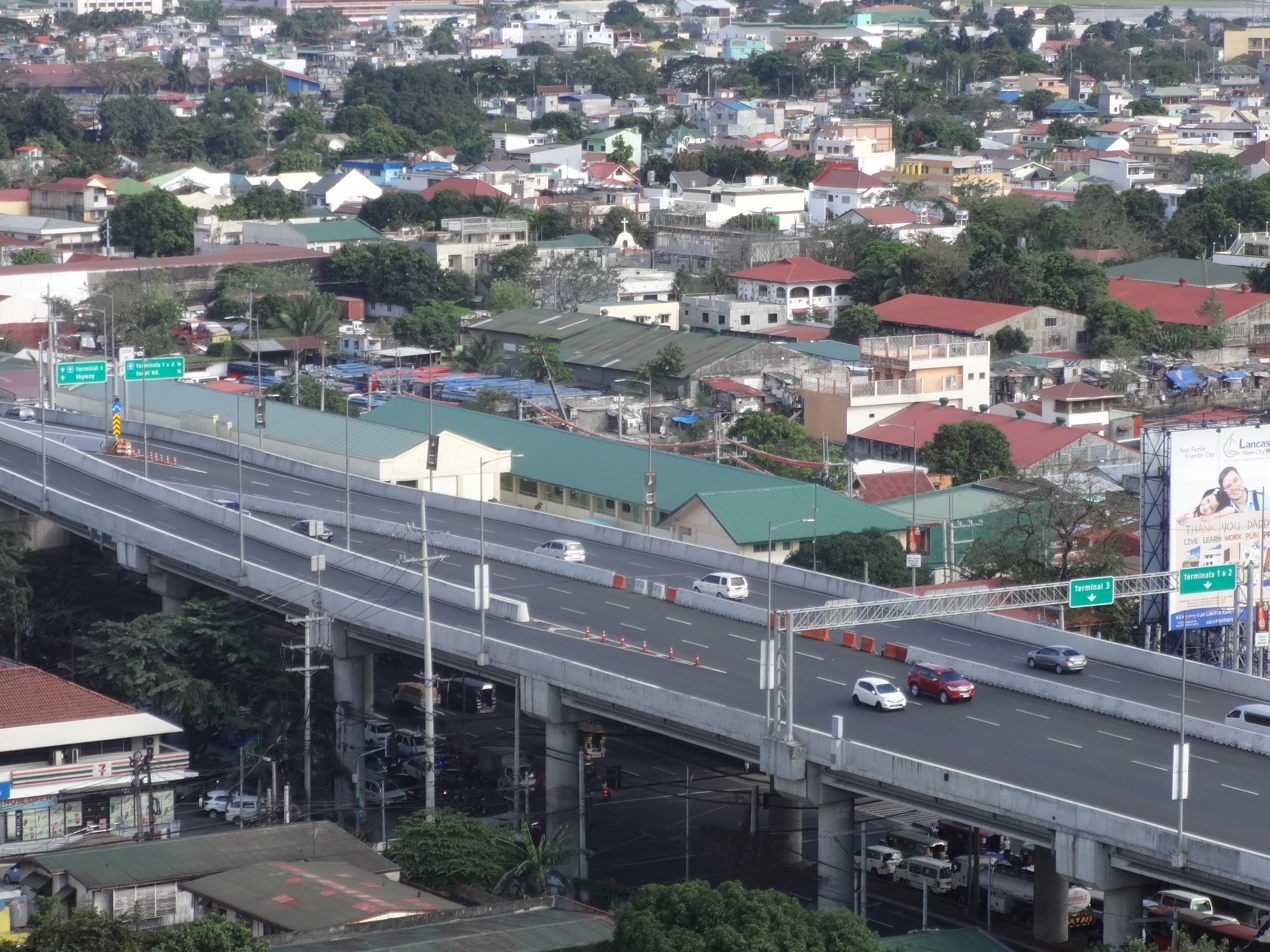
- Aerial view of Tambo

- Location within Metro Manila
- Coordinates: 14°30′59″N 120°59′20″E
- Country: Philippines
- Region: Metro Manila
- City: Parañaque
- Congressional districts: Part of the 1st district of Parañaque

Government
  - Barangay Chairman: Jennifer Quizon

Area
  - Total: 3.0959 km^{2} (1.1953 sq mi)

Population (2020)
  - Total: 26,928
  - Density: 8,698.0/km^{2} (22,528/sq mi)
- ZIP code: 1701
- Area code: 2

Tambo ([tɐmˈbɔʔ]) is a coastal barangay located in Parañaque, Metro Manila, Philippines. It is situated south of Baclaran, adjoining the Ninoy Aquino International Airport complex to the east.

The approximate boundaries are T. Alonzo Street and Asean Avenue in Baclaran to the north, McDonough Road and Don Galo to the south, with the Parañaque River, Pildera Street in Pasay, and Cut-Cut Creek to the east, and Manila Bay to the west. Across the stream in the east, Tambo is bordered by the Pasay district of Maricaban (Barangays 191–200) and the Parañaque barangay of Santo Niño (former Ibayo), where the international airport is located. It also administers most of the Aseana City business district and the Entertainment City area, both situated in the Manila Bay reclamation area called Bay City. As of the 2020 census, it had a population of 26,928.

== History ==
Tambo was named for the tiger grass used to make brooms (Filipino: walis tambo) that grew there in abundance during the Spanish colonial period. It may have also been named for the lodging houses (Spanish: tambo o casa de hospedaje de viajeros) that stood in this former colonial beach strip which was one of the earliest barrios established in the Augustinian missionary town of Parañaque. Prior to the reclamation of Roxas Boulevard (former Dewey Boulevard) during the American colonial period, Tambo was a popular beach destination for Manila residents with resorts such as Aroma and El Faro lining the Manila Bay coast.

On July 15, 1898, the First California Volunteers established Camp Dewey in a coastal forest in Tambo just north of Don Galo at the height of the Spanish–American War. This military camp in Tambo would remain under U.S. Army possession throughout the Philippine–American War and until 1937 when it was converted into a Philippine Army camp named Camp Claudio by President Manuel L. Quezon.

In the early 1900s, the barrio was the location of several seaside mansions and became an elite enclave by the latter part of the American colonial period. One such mansion is the Colonial Revival style Palacio de Memoria (former Villaroman Mansion) built in the 1930s beside the Los Tamaraos Polo Club, a sports and social club founded by Joaquín Miguel Elizalde and his brothers which was housed in a Georgian style building built in 1937. The mansion is now used as an auction house owned by Philippe Jones Lhuillier.

The beach that used to stretch from Pasay in the north - where the Manila Polo Club was originally located - to Las Piñas in the south - where Jale Beach (presumably owned by the Jalandoni and Ledesma families) was located - was gradually replaced by Dewey Boulevard (now Roxas Boulevard) after World War II.

In 1957, Barangay Tambo acquired the land between Cut-cut Creek and Manila International Airport. In 1965, barrio Tambo was excised, alongside barrio Baclaran, from Parañaque to form part of the newly-established municipality of Baclaran. However, the Supreme Court of the Philippines later voided the creation of the new municipality, thus returning the aforementioned barrios to Parañaque. It was converted into a barangay alongside all other barrios in the Philippines in 1974. On April 3, 1978, subdivisions such as the Baltao, Airlane Village, Jetlane Village, Gat Mendoza, and Vitalez were separated from Tambo to form a new independent barangay called Vitalez, by virtue of Presidential Decree No. 1327.

In 1985, the Manila–Cavite Expressway was opened on another reclaimed area in the southern section of Tambo as an extension of Roxas Boulevard. The barangay was enlarged again with the creation of Bay City west of Roxas Boulevard by the Philippine Reclamation Authority in the 1970s and 1980s as part of the South Reclamation Project under Boulevard 2000. It added 200 hectares (490 acres) of land area to Parañaque and which it now shares with neighboring Don Galo. Tambo's shoreline is now approximately 1.5 kilometers (0.93 mi) west of its original coast.

In 2003, the former American military camp known as Camp Claudio was transformed into a housing and urban development site by the national government. In 2008, the Aseana Business Park project began. In 2013, Solaire Resort & Casino, the first integrated resort of Entertainment City, was opened in the reclaimed portion west of Tambo (Bay City, Metro Manila).

In July 2026, Tambo officially expanded its boundary westward into the Bay City reclamation area, after voters ratified City Ordinance No. 2023-19 that implements a straight-line boundary approach. It now includes the Aseana City development's portion south of Asean Avenue, Entertainment City, and Asiaworld, which includes the Parañaque Integrated Terminal Exchange.

== Demographics ==
Year	Population
2007	25,371
2010	26,209
2015	25,699
2020	26,928
2024	35,356

== Education ==
The barangay is home to the following educational institutions:

- Camp Claudio Elementary School
- Nativity House of Learning
- Parañaque Christian School
- Tambo National High School
- Tambo Elementary School

== Transportation ==
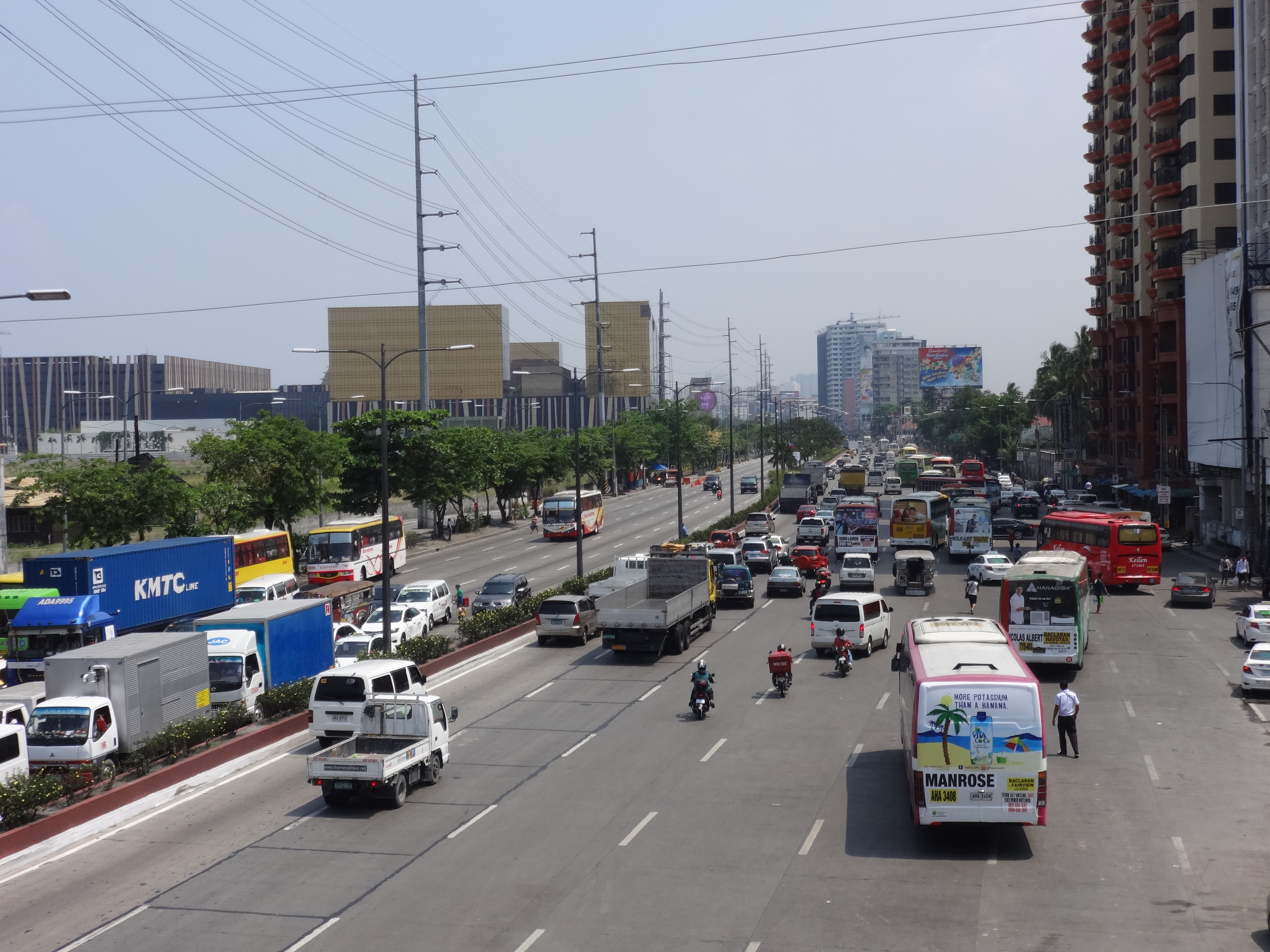
Roxas Boulevard in Tambo

Tambo is a major transportation hub in southwest Metro Manila. It is located along the busy Baclaran-Bay City traffic corridor south of EDSA where several major thoroughfares are routed through. The main north–south highways servicing Tambo are Roxas Boulevard in the north and the Manila–Cavite Expressway in the south, with NAIA Road and the elevated NAIA Expressway separating them and providing access to Ninoy Aquino International Airport and Entertainment City on either ends. Macapagal Boulevard is the main street in the barangay's Bay City section which runs parallel to José W. Diokno Boulevard further west linking these mixed-use developments and gaming hubs in Manila's new tourist belt. On the barangay's old eastern section runs the north–south Elpidio Quirino Avenue connecting Tambo to Don Galo and La Huerta to the south. It is also linked to Roxas Boulevard through the narrow Old Airport Road and to the airport complex through Andrews Avenue.

The Parañaque Integrated Terminal Exchange is located at the Asia World subdistrict of Bay City by the barangay's border with Don Galo. It is a major bus terminal with local, intercity and provincial connections. The barangay is also served by the Manila Light Rail Transit System Line 1 through jeepney connections from the Baclaran station located just 1 kilometer (0.62 mi) from the barangay . When the Line 1 extension to Cavite is completed, it will have its own station on the Manila International Airport Road (NAIA Road) at its junction with Roxas Boulevard.
