= Max Schautzer =

German radio and television presenter (1940–2025)

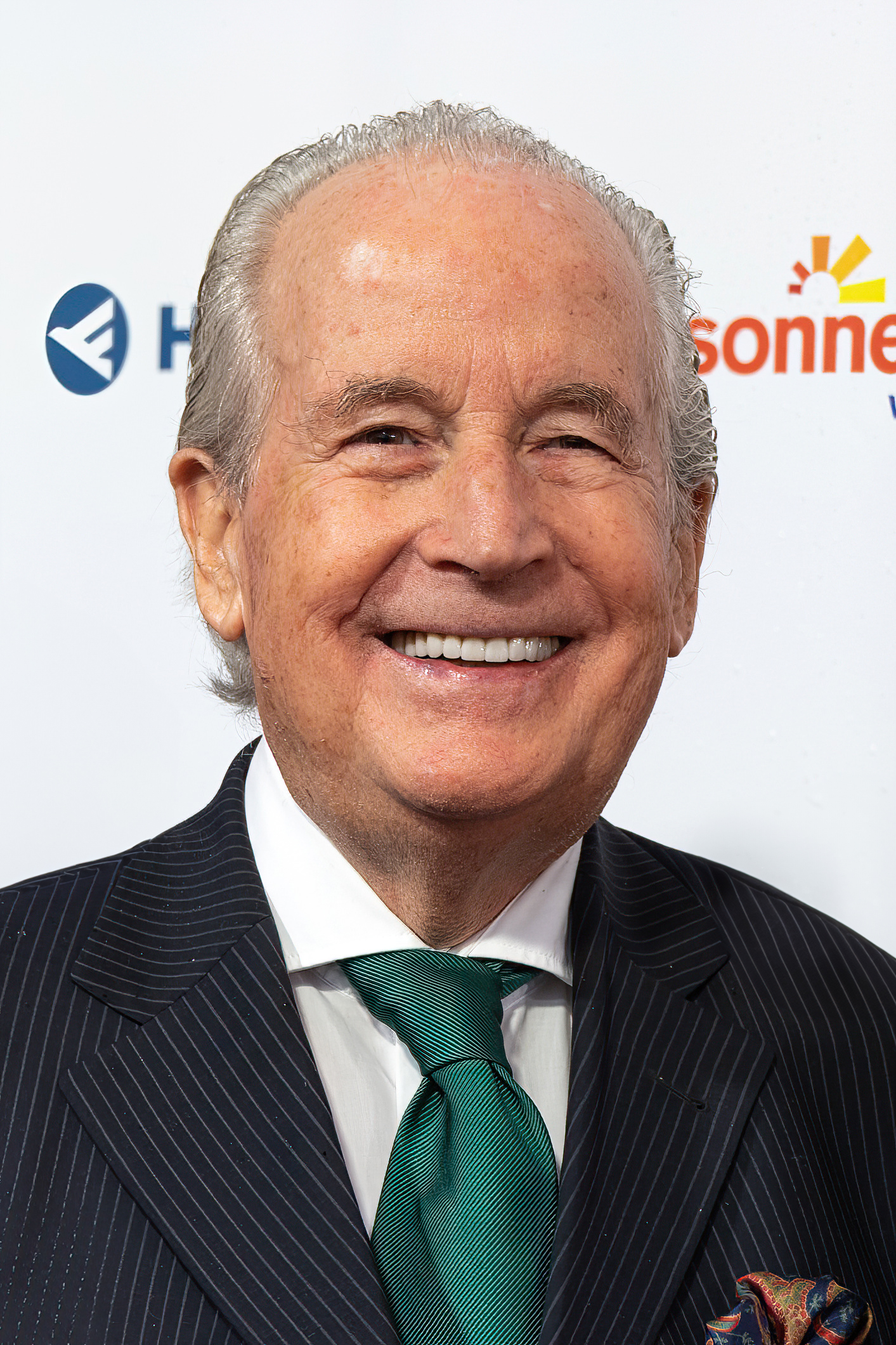
Schautzer at the 2023 Goldene Sonne Awards

Max Schautzer (14 August 1940 – 29 January 2025) was an Austrian-born German radio and television presenter, who hosted popular long-running German series such as Immer wieder Sonntags and Alles oder nichts.

== Life and career ==
Schautzer was born in Klagenfurt on 14 August 1940. He studied drama and economics in Vienna. In 1965, he left for Germany and began working for the regional broadcaster Westdeutscher Rundfunk, invited by Hans Rosenthal to his radio series Spaß muß sein. Schautzer became also known for presenting Die schönsten Melodien der Welt with Carolin Reiber, Immer wieder Sonntags and Alles oder nichts. He conceived and presented the series Pleiten, Pech und Pannen.

Schautzer moderated the Eurovision Song Contest for both German and Austrian viewers: 1979 for Austria and 1991 for Germany. In 1990 he was awarded a Bambi. He also represented WDR at the NDR-Elf.

=== Personal life ===
Schautzer married Gundel, an interior architect, in 1968. She died in 2021.

According to a close friend, he was in a hospital in Cologne for a month, before he died there on 29 January 2025, at the age of 84.
