= Entertainment City =

Gaming and entertainment complex

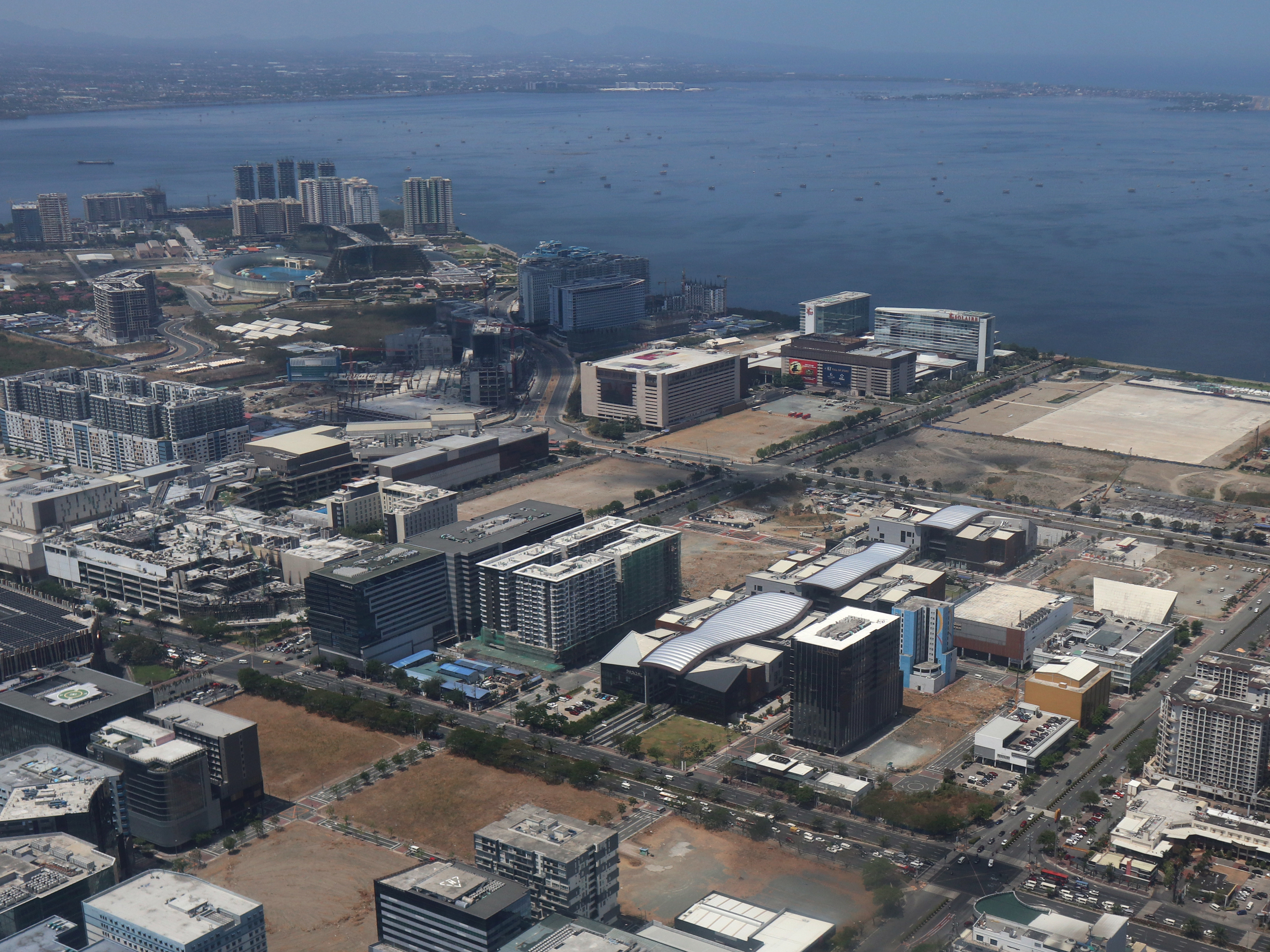
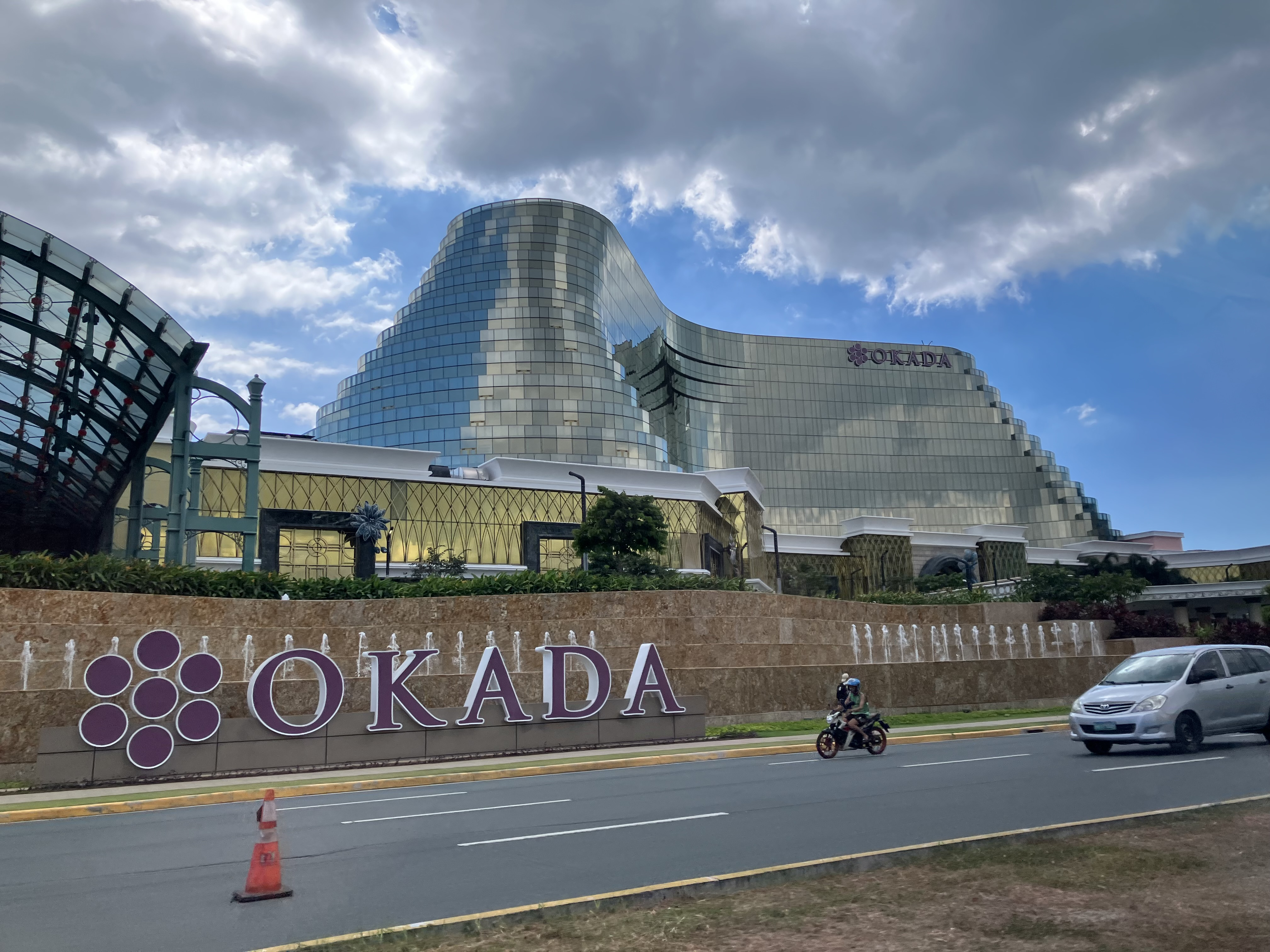
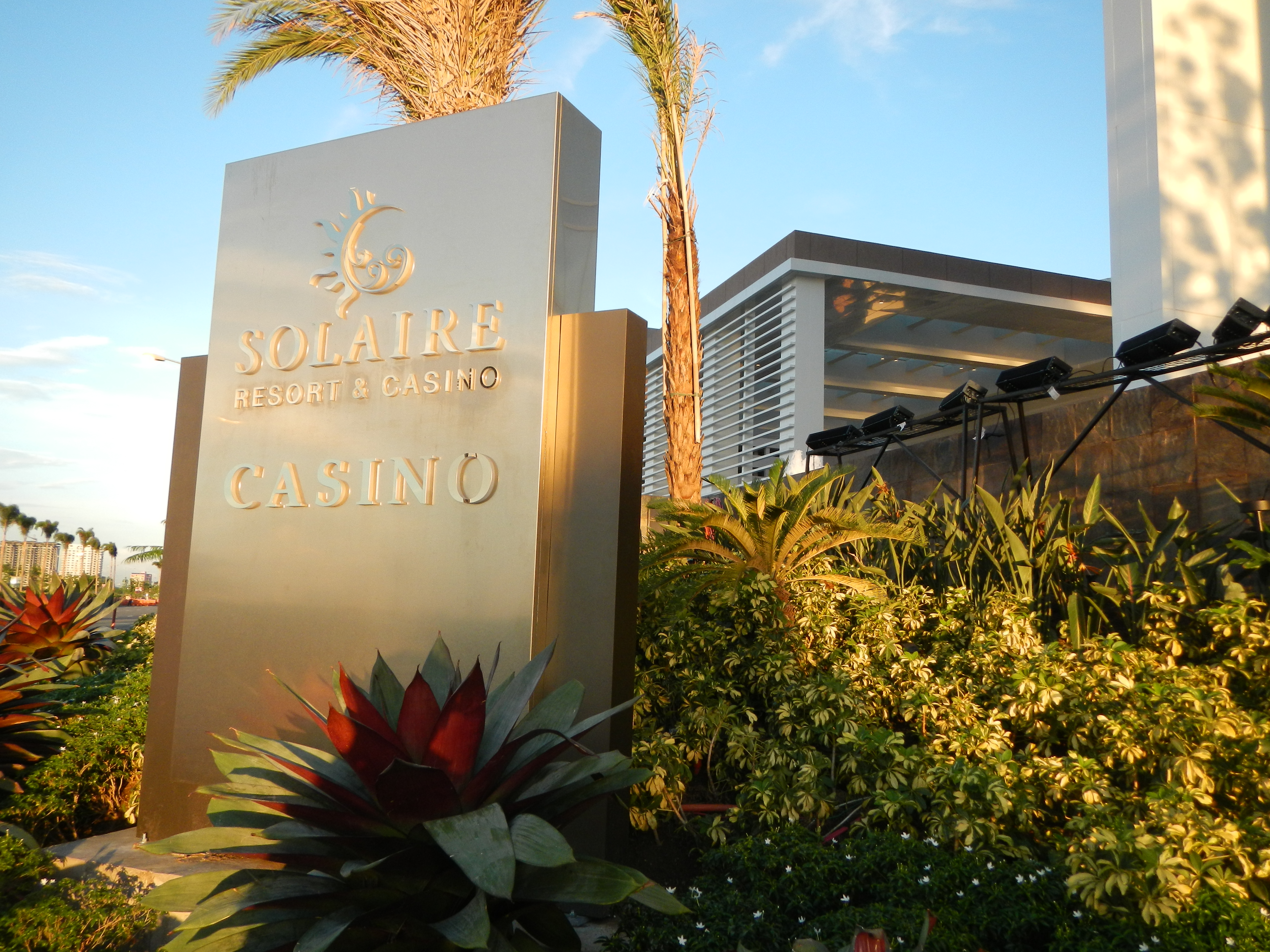
- Clockwise from top: Aerial view of Entertainment City, Solaire Resort & Casino, Okada Manila

Project
- Opening date: 2007
- Operator: Philippine Amusement and Gaming Corporation
- Owner: Philippine Amusement and Gaming Corporation
- Website: Official website

Location
- Location: Tambo, Parañaque, Metro Manila, Philippines

Entertainment City, also known as E-City (formerly PAGCOR City and Manila Bay Tourism City), is a gaming and entertainment complex under development by PAGCOR spanning an area of 8 km^{2} (3.1 sq mi) in Bay City, Metro Manila. It was first envisioned by PAGCOR in 2002 with Resorts World having the first global brand casino hotel opening nearby in August 2009, barely two years after the PAGCOR Board of Directors made the open call to global casino investors. It lies at the western side of Roxas Boulevard, south of the Central Business Park I-A (SM Mall of Asia complex and Metropolitan Park) and is shared with the Aseana City business development area within the Central Business Park I-B and C, part of Parañaque.

The project is officially named as the Bagong Nayong Pilipino–Entertainment City through an executive order by President Gloria Macapagal Arroyo and has been called several other names by the press. The most common name being referenced is "Entertainment City". The site has been declared a PEZA-approved economic zone, and in 2017, President Rodrigo Duterte renamed Entertainment City to Expo Pilipino Entertainment City after the exposition for the centennial celebration of Philippine independence in 1998 called Expo Pilipino.

== Major hotels and casinos ==
Originally, four integrated resort projects have been qualified in accordance with the terms of reference and are under construction by phases.

- Solaire Resort & Casino was the first integrated resort casino complex to open in Entertainment City, with a launch at a costing $1 million on 16 March 2013. Built at a cost of US$1.2 billion, the resort casino sits on 8.3 hectares of land. It is owned by Bloomberry Resorts Corporation of port magnate Enrique Razon.
- City of Dreams Manila was the second resort casino complex to open at Entertainment City. It is owned by Melco Resorts and Entertainment (Philippines) Corporation, a joint venture between Melco-Crown and its local partner Belle Corporation of mall magnate Henry Sy of SM Investments Corporation. It was soft-launched on December 14, 2014, with a grand opening on February 2, 2015. Built at a cost of $1.3 billion, the resort casino sits on a 6.2-hectare property at the Entertainment City gaming complex, featuring three luxurious hotel brands: Nobu, Nüwa, and Hyatt Regency with an aggregate of 950 rooms. The Fortune Egg structure is its most prominent featured design.
- Okada Manila (formerly Manila Bay Resorts) is the third resort casino complex to open in Entertainment City. It is owned by Tiger Resorts Leisure and Entertainment, Inc., the Philippine subsidiary of Universal Entertainment Corporation. It features a large fountain and an indoor beach club. The resort casino opened on December 30, 2016.
- Westside City Resorts World (formerly Resorts World Bayshore) is an upcoming integrated resort casino complex within Entertainment City. The gaming resort, owing to its location on the west side of the Entertainment City complex, was renamed as such in 2014. When completed, it was planned include Hotel Okura Manila, Westin Hotel, Kingsford Hotel, Genting Grand and Crockfords Tower offering some 1,500 guest rooms. It was expected to start initial operations in 2021, but was persistently delayed, due to the COVID-19 pandemic. It is currently targeting to open in the third quarter of 2026. The resort casino is owned by Travellers International Hotels Group and its partner the Genting Group, which owns the Resorts World Brand and the real estate developer, Megaworld Corporation of Andrew Tan.
- Grand Westside Hotel is a twin-tower hotel complex within the Westside City township. It is a landmark development by Megaworld Corporation. It is currently the largest hotel in the Philippines by room count, offering 1,530 guest rooms. Construction started in 2019, and the hotel was completed and inaugurated on June 22, 2024. It is set to be rebranded as the Mövenpick Manila Bay Westside in 2026.
- NayonLanding is the upcoming integrated resort casino complex, across from Okada Manila. It was intended to be built by Landing Resorts Philippines Development Corp. and to include the new Nayong Filipino cultural theme park as part of its features. The new operator was expected to groundbreak on August 9, 2018. The project is currently stalled due to the five-year moratorium on new casinos in Entertainment City.

== SMDC Festival Grounds ==
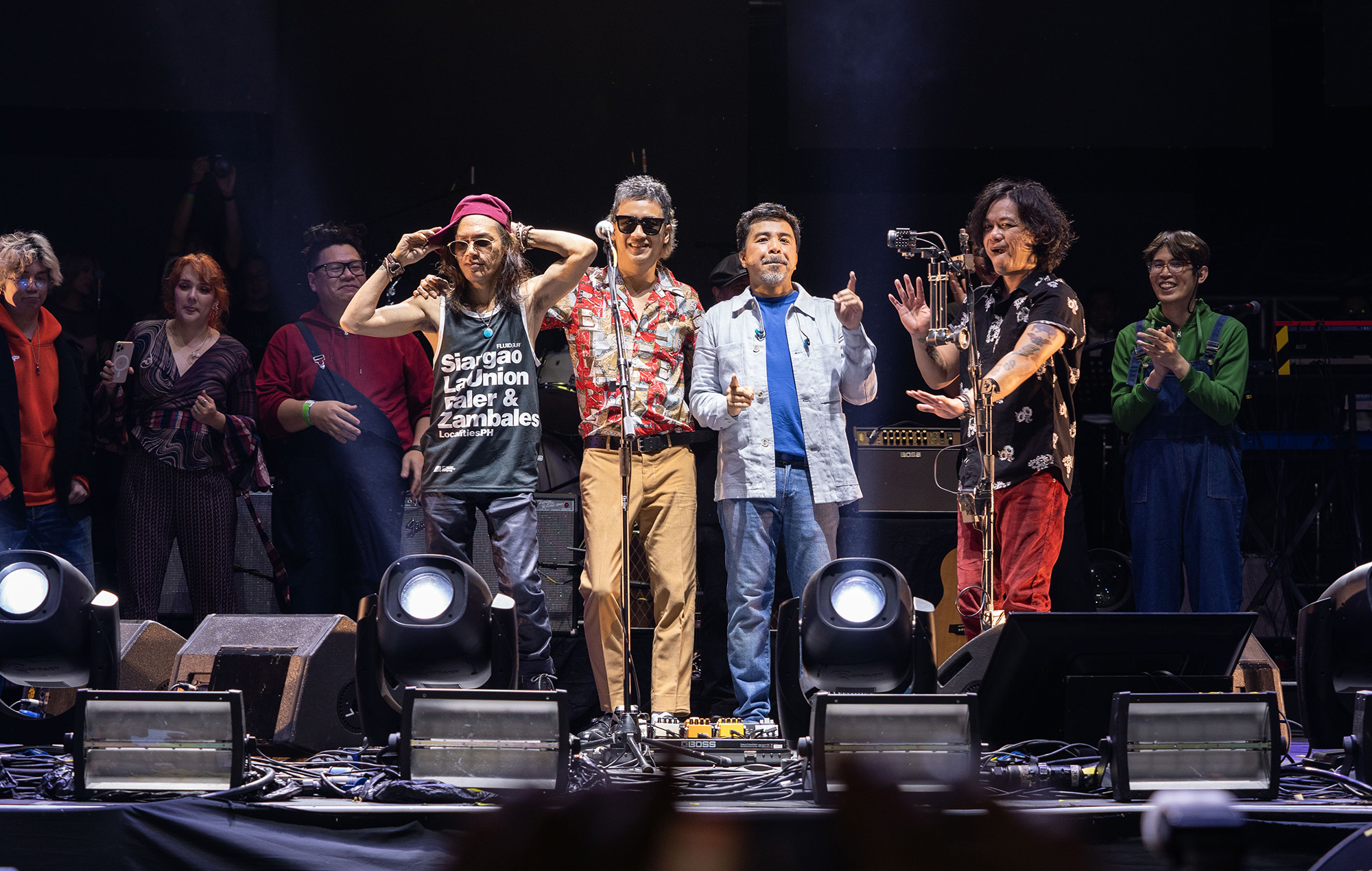
The Eraserheads during their reunion concert at the SMDC Festival Grounds on December 22, 2022

The SMDC Festival Grounds is a two-hectare urban open space in Entertainment City, directly opposite Solaire Resort. Owned by the SM Development Corporation (SMDC), it can accommodate over 55,000 attendees, making it an ideal venue for large-scale events, including concerts and music festivals featuring both local and international acts.

The grounds' inaugural event, POPstival, occurred on October 21, 2022, showcasing a lineup of K-pop and P-pop performers such as Alamat, BB Girls, Be'O, Bini, Hyolyn, KAIA, Loona, Park Bom, Press Hit Play, SB19, and Viviz. Subsequently, the venue hosted the first multi-day festival, 88rising's Head in the Clouds, on December 9 and 10, 2022, with a lineup including Joji, Got7's Jackson Wang, Niki, Rich Brian, and former Day6 member Jae Park.

Ben&Ben's "homecoming" concert on December 18, 2022, marked the first time a band headlined at the venue, drawing an estimated crowd of 65,000. This record was surpassed just days later on December 22 by the Eraserheads reunion concert, "Huling El Bimbo 2022", attracting around 75,000 attendees.

The final iteration of the Rakrakan Festival took place at the grounds on November 25 and 26, 2023, featuring over 170 rock artists led by Rico Blanco and Ely Buendia. Additionally, the venue hosted a reunion concert for the band Rivermaya on February 17, 2024.

Ed Sheeran performed on March 9, 2024, the first time a solo international artist headlined a concert at the grounds. It was part of his +–=÷× (Mathematics) Tour, with Calum Scott and Ben&Ben opening the show, and the latter performing "Maybe the Night" with Sheeran.

Concerts held at the SMDC Festival Grounds
| Date | Artist(s) | Event | Opening/supporting act(s) | Attendance | Revenue (US$) |
2022
| October 21 | Various: Alamat; BB Girls; Be'O; Bini; Hyolyn; KAIA; Loona; Park Bom; Press Hit Play; SB19; Viviz | POPstival | —N/a | —N/a | —N/a |
| December 9 | Various: Joji; Jackson Wang; Niki; Rich Brian; eaJ; Yoasobi; Zedd; Adawa; Akini Jing; Atarashii Gakko!; Bibi; Elephante; Guapdad 4000; Jinxzhou; Manila Grey; Milli; Spence Lee; Stephanie Poetri; Warren Hue; SB19; Ylona Garcia; Zack Tabudlo | Head in the Clouds Festival | —N/a | —N/a | —N/a |
| December 10 | Various: Joji; Jackson Wang; Niki; Rich Brian; eaJ; Yoasobi; Zedd; Adawa; Akini Jing; Atarashii Gakko!; Bibi; Elephante; Guapdad 4000; Jinxzhou; Manila Grey; Milli; Spence Lee; Stephanie Poetri; Warren Hue; SB19; Ylona Garcia; Zack Tabudlo | Head in the Clouds Festival | —N/a | —N/a | —N/a |
| December 18 | Ben&Ben | Ben&Ben Homecoming Concert 2022: Manila | —N/a | —N/a | —N/a |
| December 22 | Eraserheads | Huling El Bimbo 2022 | —N/a | 75,000 / 75,000 | —N/a |
2023
| November 25 | Various: Rico Blanco; Unique; Zild Benitez; Blaster Silonga; December Avenue; Mayonnaise; Bandang Lapis; mrld; Dilaw; Kean Cipriano; Gracenote; Moonstar88; SunKissed Lola; Magnus Haven; Imago; Tanya Markova; Kiyo; This Band; Silent Sanctuary; Barbie Almalbis; Siakol; Brownman Revival; The Youth; Basti Artadi; Greyhoundz; Razorback; Chicosci; Typecast; Dong Abay; Franco; P.O.T.; Urbandub; 6cyclemind; MOJOFLY | Rakrakan Festival | —N/a | —N/a | —N/a |
| November 26 | Various: Rico Blanco; Unique; Zild Benitez; Blaster Silonga; December Avenue; Mayonnaise; Bandang Lapis; mrld; Dilaw; Kean Cipriano; Gracenote; Moonstar88; SunKissed Lola; Magnus Haven; Imago; Tanya Markova; Kiyo; This Band; Silent Sanctuary; Barbie Almalbis; Siakol; Brownman Revival; The Youth; Basti Artadi; Greyhoundz; Razorback; Chicosci; Typecast; Dong Abay; Franco; P.O.T.; Urbandub; 6cyclemind; MOJOFLY | Rakrakan Festival | —N/a | —N/a | —N/a |
2024
| February 17 | Rivermaya | Rivermaya: The Reunion | —N/a | —N/a | —N/a |
| March 9 | Ed Sheeran | +−=÷× Tour | Calum Scott; Ben&Ben | 35,223 / 35,223 | 6,031,560 |
2025
| November 23 | Hillsong London | Hillsong London: Asia Tour | —N/a | —N/a | —N/a |
2026
| February 7 | Various: Adie; Earl Agustin; Alamat; Ely Buendia; Bamboo; Bini; Cup of Joe; Denise Julia; Dionela; Sarah Geronimo; Gloc-9; Kamikazee; Arthur Nery; Parokya ni Edgar; Amiel Sol | Wonderful Moments Music Festival | —N/a | —N/a | —N/a |
| February 8 | Various: Adie; Earl Agustin; Alamat; Ely Buendia; Bamboo; Bini; Cup of Joe; Denise Julia; Dionela; Sarah Geronimo; Gloc-9; Kamikazee; Arthur Nery; Parokya ni Edgar; Amiel Sol | Wonderful Moments Music Festival | —N/a | —N/a | —N/a |
| April 18 | SB19 | Wakas at Simula: The Trilogy Concert Finale | TBA | TBA | TBA |
2027
| February 20 | BigBang | XX: Cosmos World Tour | TBA | TBA | TBA |

== See also ==
- Gambling in Metro Manila
- PAGCOR Tower
