= Immer wieder Sonntags =

German television entertainment show

- English: Again on Sundays
- Created by: SWR
- Starring: Max Schautzer (1995-2003); Sebastian Deyle (2004); Stefan Mross (2005-)
- Opening theme: Immer wieder Sonntags performed by Stefan Mross
- Country of origin: Germany
- No. of episodes: 10-14

Production
- Production location: Europa-Park
- Running time: 90 minutes

Original release
- Network: Das Erste
- Release: 1995

Immer wieder Sonntags (Again on Sundays) is a German television entertainment show which is broadcast live every Sunday in the summer months from Europa Park in Rust, in southwestern Germany. The series was first aired in 1995 and is produced by Werner Kimmig GmbH on behalf of Südwestrundfunk (SWR) (southwest Broadcasting). There are usually 10-14 episodes aired during the summer season live from the theme park along with Das Beste aus Immer Wieder Sonntags (The Best of Again on Sundays). In 2002 a winter edition called Immer Wieder Samstags (Again on Saturdays) was broadcast for three Saturdays. The show takes its name and opening song, sung by Stefan Mross, from the 1973 hit by Eurovision singers Cindy & Bert.

== History ==
The show has regular guests and revolves around comedy and singers of pop and folk music. First presented by Max Schautzer, the first broadcast was in 1995 and included performances by Roberto Blanco. Sebastian Deyle then took over as the show's presenter; however a decline in ratings resulted in Stefan Mross taking over after one year which resulted in a ratings recovery.

In 2010, Axel Bulthaupt presented an episode in August when Mross was absent for private reasons.

During a live show on 10 August 2014, Mross was forced to leave the stage after chili tasting on various levels of the Scoville scale. He later collapsed behind the stage due to circulatory failure and had to be taken to hospital. The remainder of the show was taken over by performing guests Marc Pircher and Guido Cantz.

In 2014, the show celebrated its 10th anniversary of broadcasting, with Mross as the host, by airing three episodes for a longer air time of 120 minutes on 31 August and 7 and 14 September. On 5 October, "Immer wieder Stefan – Die große Jubiläumsshow" (Again and again, Stefan — the big anniversary show) was broadcast.

== Summer hit winners ==
Since 2007, each show has crowned a Sommerhitkönig/königin (Summer Hit King/Queen) were singers and groups compete for the title, with 2 winners being determined by viewers voting by telephone. Previous winners include Rico Seith.
