= Rakrakan Festival =

Annual music festival by Rakista Radio

- Genre: Original Pilipino music
- Locations: Most recent CCP Open Grounds, Pasay (2020-); Previous; Coral Way Open Parking, Pasay (2013); Globe Circuit Event Grounds, Makati (2014-16, 2019); Mall of Asia Concert Grounds, Pasay (2017); Aseana City Concert Grounds, Parañaque (2018)
- Years active: 12 years
- Inaugurated: December 21, 2013
- Most recent: March 1–2, 2019
- Organiser: Rakista Radio
- Website: www.rakrakanfestival.com

Rakrakan Festival is an annual music and arts festival in the Philippines produced by rock music news website and internet radio station Rakista Radio (formerly Rakista.com). Aiming to be the biggest OPM gathering in the Philippines, the festival consists of more than 120 OPM acts in different genres, particularly from rock, hip hop, and indie among others. Held in every first quarter of the year, Rakrakan Festival entertains its attendees with not only just live music, but also a purely local merchandise bazaar, food stalls, skateboarding exhibitions, live art installations and exhibitions, and more.

== History ==
=== 2013 ===
Starting off with only 50 bands, Rakrakan Festival 2013 with the theme "Rock ‘Til You Drop" kicked off on December 21, 2013, as Rakista Radio ambitioned the rock community to be seen by a wider audience. Two stages—the Move and Mosh Stage—were set up at the Coral Way Open Parking in Pasay. Their goal for OPM support was met after an audience estimate of 10,000 attendees.

=== 2014 ===
Following their first successful year of gathering the country's music community, they proceeded with Rakrakan Festival 2014 held in the Globe Circuit Events Ground in Makati. Although maintaining the similar theme "Rock ‘Til You Drop", the organizers have expanded the festival's amenities by adding 20 more artists and one more stage—now with a total of 70 bands and three stages: the Move, Mosh, and Groove Stage.

=== 2015/2016 ===
Rakrakan Festival 2015 still bore the same theme, "Rock ‘Til You Drop", with the same number of artists and stages, and in the same venue as before. Initially, it was scheduled on December 19, 2015, but due to two simultaneous tropical depressions—Onyok and Nona—which hit the country in the same month, Rakrakan Festival 2015 was rescheduled a month later to January 16, 2016.

It was also in this year where Rakrakan Festival introduced their first street art exhibition.

=== 2017 ===
OPM Against Drugs was the festival's official theme for 2017 and was held at the Mall of Asia Concert Grounds in Pasay on January 14, 2017. In this year, Rakrakan Festival leveled up as they have invited 100 local acts and added 2 more stages than the usual: the Indie and Slam Stage. The festival was also attended by notable public officials from the Philippine National Police. However, problems arose just a few days before the event as some of the acts backed out from the lineup due to various reasons, most of which includes a stance against President Rodrigo Duterte's drug war campaign.

=== 2018 ===
Come February 24, 2018, Rakrakan Festival moved to the Aseana City Concert Grounds in Parañaque City, bearing the theme "Pinoy Muna!"'—taking a stand for nationalistic pride. Due to the tremendous amount of attendees in the previous Rakrakan Festivals and the demand for a bigger lineup, the organizing team decided to take one step higher and added 20 more main artists to the roster and one brand-new stage: the Tropa Center Stage, which paved the way for mainstream pop, R&B, and hiphop artists to be included in what seems to be just branded as a regular rock festival.

=== 2019 ===
Rakrakan Festival 2019 had a different gameplay. The festival was held for two consecutive days, from March 1 to March 2, 2019, at the Globe Circuit Event Grounds in Makati with the theme "Peace, Love, and Music". Due to the venue's limited space, the 6 stages were split up to 3 stages per day to accommodate the whole weekend. Also, the Groove Stage was also renamed to Peace Stage to be more aligned to the festival theme and to emphasize inclusivity.

On Day 1, the Move Stage, Center Stage, and Indie Stage were set up and on the other hand, Day 2 had the Mosh Stage, Slam Stage, and Peace Stage.

Also on this year, various non-government organizations were invited and given a chance to speak out their respective advocacies on stage and augment their campaigns on ground. NGOs who participated Rakrakan Festival 2019 were Haribon Foundation, Kreon, and Virlanie Foundation.

=== 2020 ===
Rakrakan Festival 2020, which bears the same theme, "Peace, Love, and Music", was supposed to be held on February 29, 2020, at the CCP Open Grounds in Pasay, but on February 16, it was announced that the event is postponed due to the COVID-19 pandemic. Originally, it was rescheduled to April 25, 2020, but it was postponed once again until further notice.

=== 2023 ===
The last Rakrakan Festival will be held on November 25 to 26 at the SMDC Concert Grounds, Parañaque.

== Stages ==
=== Move Stage ===
A staple since the first Rakrakan Festival, the Move Stage includes bands and artists from alternative rock, punk rock, grunge, or pop rock genres.

=== Mosh Stage ===
Another staple since the genesis of Rakrakan Festival, the Mosh Stage consists of alternative metal, metalcore, or post-grunge bands.

=== Groove Stage/Peace Stage ===
Originally named as the Groove Stage and later officially renamed as the Peace Stage on 2019, it is notable for swaying away from the usual heavy rock music as this stage is dedicated to reggae, ska, soul, indie pop, and folk artists.

=== Slam Stage ===
The Slam Stage is the haven for heavy metal, death metal, progressive metal, and metalcore bands.

=== Center Stage ===
To include more artists to the annual roster, Rakrakan Festival finally opened up their doors to pop, R&B, and hiphop artists thru the Center Stage.

Upon introducing this stage, the event had been criticized of including such genres to the lineup due to the branding coming off from the event title itself—"Rakrakan Festival", which connotes exclusivity to the rock genre only and its likes.

=== Indie Stage ===
The Indie Stage is also included in the yearly Rakrakan Festival to include artists coming from the broad spectrum of the indie genre, some of which lie under new wave, synth pop, electronic and the like.
