= PAGCOR Tower =

Proposed observation tower in Manila, Philippines

- Artist's sketch of the PAGCOR Tower

General information
- Status: Never built
- Type: Observation
- Architectural style: Modern
- Location: Parañaque, Metro Manila, Philippines
- Coordinates: 14°31′12″N 120°58′39″E
- Cost: $1 billion
- Owner: Philippine Amusement and Gaming Corporation

Height
- Antenna spire: 650 or 655 m (2,133 or 2,149 ft)

Design and construction
- Developer: Genting Berhad

The PAGCOR Tower was a proposed 650 or 655 m (2,133 or 2,149 ft) tall observation tower near Manila Bay in Parañaque, Metro Manila, Philippines. The tower was envisioned as a centerpiece of the now opened Pagcor City (or Entertainment City Manila), an integrated leisure area comprising hotels, shopping malls, convention centers, and casinos. If constructed, it would have ranked among the tallest towers globally.

The concept for the tower was developed by Malaysian conglomerate Genting Berhad, which aimed to create a landmark attraction for the area.

The project was conceptualized during the administration of Pagcor chairman Efraim Genuino. However, in 2010, after the appointment of Cristino Naguiat as chairman, it was reported that the project was under review. Naguiat indicated that plans for the tower and other projects "would likely be scrapped," despite continued development efforts in Entertainment City.

== See also ==
- List of tallest buildings in Metro Manila
- Pagcor City
