= Riko =

- Gender: Female
- Language: Japanese

Origin
- Origin: Japan
- Meaning: Different meanings depending on the kanji used

Riko (written: 理子, 璃子, 莉子, 里琴 or りこ in hiragana) is a feminine Japanese given name.

== Notable people with the given name Riko ==
Notable people with the name include:

- Riko Azuna (born 1993), Japanese singer
- Riko E. Bishop (born 1956), American judge
- Riko Gunji (born 2002), Japanese badminton player
- Riko Higashio (東尾 理子; born 1975), Japanese professional golfer
- Riko Kohara (小原 莉子; born 1990), Japanese voice actress and guitarist
- Riko Korie (梱枝 りこ), Japanese illustrator and member of Kero Q and Makura
- Riko Miyagi (宮城 理子), Japanese manga artist
- Riko Mizuno (born 1932), Japanese gallerist
- Riko Sakaguchi (idol) (born 1994), Japanese idol and former member of the female idol group HKT48
- Riko Muranaka (村中 璃子), Japanese physician and journalist
- Riko Narumi (成海 璃子; born 1992), Japanese actress and model
- Riko Ueki (植木 理子; born 1999), Japanese women's footballer
- Riko Yamaya (山谷 理子; born 1995), Japanese ice hockey player
- Riko Yoshida (吉田 里琴; born 1999), Japanese actress. She changed her stage name to Ai Yoshikawa in 2017.

== Fictional characters ==
- Riko, a main character from the anime series LBX Girls.
- Riko (リコ), a character from the mixed-media franchise Made In Abyss
- Riko Aida (相田 リコ Aida Riko), Seirin's basketball coach in Kuroko no Basuke.
- Riko Amanai, a character from Jujutsu Kaisen
- Riko Kashimoto, a character from the video game Umamusume: Pretty Derby
- Riko Kurahashi (倉橋 莉子) , a character from the manga Love Lab.
- Riko Matsumoto (Erwin) , a character from Girls und Panzer
- Riko Mine, a character from the light novel Aria the Scarlet Ammo
- Riko Moriyama, a character from the All for the Game book series by Nora Sakavic.
- Riko Saeki, a main character from Adou
- Riko Saida, a character from Ultraman Nexus
- Riko Sakurauchi (桜内 梨子), a character from the media-mix project Love Live! Sunshine!!
- Riko Yazawa, a character from the video game and anime Little Battlers Experience

== Other people ==
- Riko Simanjuntak, Indonesian footballer

== See also ==
- Rico (name), given name and surname
