= Press Hit Play =

Filipino boy band

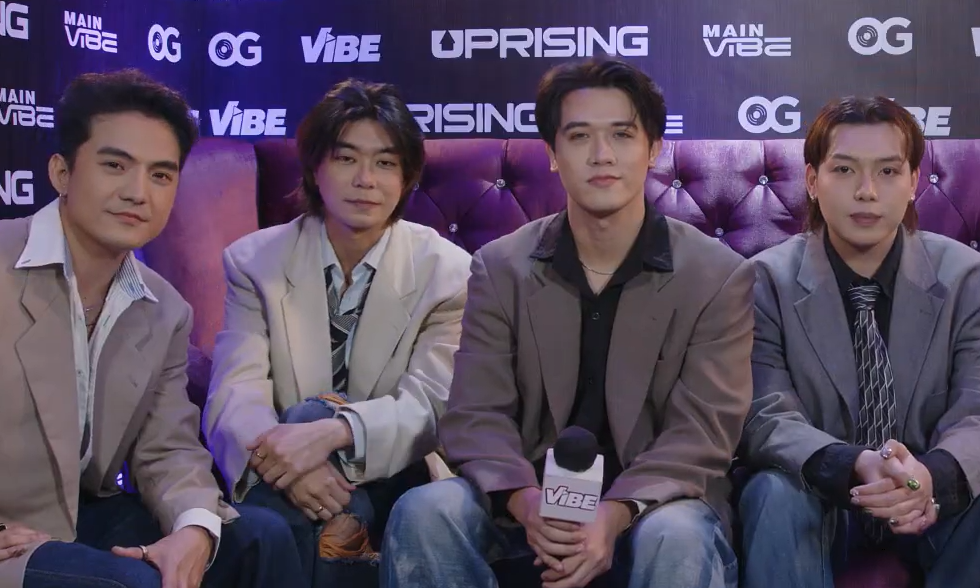
- PHP in December 2025; From left: JP, Yuuki, CHRLS, and Sev

Background information
- Also known as: PHP; Power House Philippines (formerly)
- Origin: Manila, Philippines
- Genres: P-pop; pop; EDM
- Years active: 2018–present
- Label: Evolution Media Ltd.
- Members: CHRLS; Yuuki; JP; Sev
- Past members: Zi.O; Yukito; J.O (Pre-debut)

Press Hit Play is a Filipino boy band, consisting of CHRLS, Yuuki, JP, and Sev. They were formerly named Power House Philippines but with a mononym of PHP. The group was originally formed in 2018 but disbanded, then reformed three years later in 2021.

== Career ==
Press Hit Play traced their connections as solo performers or part of previous cover groups in the country's P-pop community landscape. A history of countless border-crossing opportunities sharpened them and allowed winning international awards. They underwent training for at least two years. Some of the members are not new in the entertainment industry. JP Soliva and CHRLS Rodriguez were former trainees of ShowBT Entertainment. CHRLS had also trained in JU Entertainment while JP had also trained in RBW Entertainment.

=== 2021: Formation and debut ===
On June 28 Press Hit Play shared a post on social media, and continued to share posts from its agency's social media account accounts their pre- debut single and debut date. On July 2, Press Hit Play changed their name on social media into Press Hit Play from PHP. On July 16, they released a first pre-debut single "Galakbay" and a pre-debut single album "PHP". On August 6, Press Hit Play officially debuted with the single "WIN", first released on digital platforms and later released their first music video on its YouTube channel. It is an anthem of encouragement and inspiration from their heartwarming brotherhood formed from former rivalry.

“We trained for two years while staying together in one house to practice more efficiently. The team first focused on dancing by learning different foundations. We also developed our stamina by doing a lot of cardio exercises. Later, we worked on enhancing and developing our vocals while learning to write and produce our songs."

— CHRLS

=== 2022: Official comeback, Yukito and Zi.O's departure ===
On January 21, the group made their first official comeback. The group premieres their official come back music video "Tell Me". It was inspired by a Walt Disney movie and written about a person who is in love. Lyrically, ‘Tell Me’ was built-around the story of a person who is hopelessly in love. "Tell Me" music video features “retro-pop stylings of the ‘80s sound”.

On April 10, Press Hit Play performed at the first-ever P-pop Convention (PPOP Con) at Araneta City together with other Pinoy pop artists.

On April 25, it was announced that Yukito was leaving the group, it was also said that the group would still continue as a five-member group and would release a new comeback single. On July 13, Press Hit and Play became a four-member group when Zi.O, the main rapper and lead dancer left the group in pursuit of his well-being. With his departure, Press Hit Play became the only active male Filipino boy group with four members.

On July 15, the group took part on the "TUGATOG: The Filipino Music Festival 2022" alongside other Filipino idol groups.

=== 2022: A year since debut ===
On September 30, Press Hit Play released their single "Sambit". A song about the group journey, struggles and an inspiration to move forward and reach their dreams.

On October 21, Press Hit Play released their single "Forever Young". It is a song about making the most out of life at any age. The group had their first live stage performance of their single "Forever Young" on the "POPstival 2022: KPOP meets PPOP" few hours after it was released.

On November 30, the group received their first ever award "PPOP Male Stars of the Night" at "The 7th Philippine Pop - PPOP AWARDS 2022".

On December 6, Press Hit Play bagged their second award "Most Promising PPOP Group of the Year” at the "4th Philippine Faces of Success 2023".

=== 2023: Present ===
Press Hit Play has started the year 2023 with music releases. After the group released their "Forever Young" music video, they unveiled two another singles - "MNLUV" and "BALARAW".

On February 26, the group performed at "GMA Kapuso Foundation's Sagip Dugtong Buhay Bloodletting Project".

== Members ==
Current

- CHRLS – lead vocalist, songwriter
- JP – lead vocalist, lead dancer, songwriter, and producer
- Sev – main vocalist
- Yuuki – main dancer, choreographer

Former

- Yukito (2021-22)
- Zi.O (2021-22)

Pre-debut

- J.O (2020)

== Discography ==
=== Singles ===
List of singles showing year released and album name
Title	Year	Peak chart positions	Album
Title	Year	PHL Songs	Album
"Galakbay"	2021	—	Non-album singles
"Marilag"	2021	—	Non-album singles
"Yuno"	2021	—	Non-album singles
"WIN"	2021	—	Non-album singles
"Adlaw"	2021	—	Non-album singles
"Tell Me"	2022	—	Non-album singles
"Sambit"	2022	—	Non-album singles
"Forever Young"	2022	—	Non-album singles
"MNLUV"	2023	—	Non-album singles
"Balaraw"	2023	—	Non-album singles
"Wala Na Ba?"	2023	—	Non-album singles
"Hey Love!"	2024	—	Non-album singles
"Isa Dalawa Tatlo"	2024	—	Non-album singles
"Lampara"	2024	—	Non-album singles
"Tulipan"	2024	—	Non-album singles
"Pansamantala"	2025	—	Non-album singles
"Akin Ka Muna Ngayong Gabi"	2025	—	Non-album singles
"Mi Amor"	2026	—	Non-album singles

== Filmography ==
=== Music videos ===
==== 2020s ====
Title	Year	Other performer(s) credited	Director(s)	Description	Ref.
"Galakbay"	2020	None	PHP members	Pre-Debut Series Galakbay - Yukito and Rhadz	
"Marilag"	2020	None	PHP members	Pre-Debut Series Marilag - Zio ft. Charles	
"Yuno"	2020	None	PHP members	Pre-Debut Series YUNO - PHP JP	
"WIN"	2021	None	Titus Cee		
"Adlaw"	2021	None	Press Hit Play		
"Tell Me"	2022	None	Raymond Fabian		
"Sambit"	2022	None	Superb Us Ent.		
"Forever Young"	2023	None	Yuuki Ito, Cheryl Trinidad		
"Finggah Lickin'"	2023	Eugene Domingo		Becky And Badette Original Song	

== Awards and nominations ==
Award ceremony	Year	Category	Nominee(s)/work(s)	Result	Ref.
VP Choice Awards 2022	2023	VP/Spotlight of the Year	Press Hit Play	Nominated	
WPVR 2022 Year-End Pinnacle Awards	2023	Best New Artist	Press Hit Play	Nominated	
4th Philippine Faces of Success 2023	2022	Most Promising PPOP Group of the Year	Press Hit Play	Won	
PPOP Awards	2022	PPOP Boy Group of the Year	Press Hit Play	Nominated	
PPOP Awards	2022	PPOP Male Stars of the Night	Press Hit Play	Won	
RAWR Awards	2022	Favorite Group	Press Hit Play	Nominated	
TikTok Awards PH	2022	PPOP Group of the Year	Press Hit Play	Nominated	
