= Rico Seith =

- Born: 31 May 1994 (age 31); Karlsruhe, Germany
- Genres: Schlager
- Years active: 2008-2010
- Labels: Sony Music, Ariola
- Website: Official Rico Seith The Website has been closed.

Rico Seith (born 31 May 1994 in Karlsruhe) is a German singer, his area of music is Schlager.

== Early life ==
Rico grew up in Karlsruhe, Germany. At the age of 10, he was discovered by Benjamin Zibret, the manager and Schlager producer of the Bruchsaler Schloßspatzen. Since then, Rico has been singing in the group as an ensemble member and soloist. He is also pursuing his solo career as a German Schlager artiste.

== Career ==
Benjamin started working with Rico as a Schlager artiste and also produced his first Maxi-CD Santa Rosa.

On 10 August 2008, Rico won first place on the ARD (broadcaster) TV-Show, Immer wieder Sonntags, and became the 2008 Sommerhit-King.

He went on to win the runner-up at the pre-qualifiers for the Grand Prix der Volksmusik on 21 May 2009.

In his free time he enjoys gymnastics and riding his motocross bike, which he named "Suzi".

When he was asked what his plans are for the future, his response was: "To impress people with my singing, and become well known with my music".

== Prizes and Nominations ==
- Sommerhit-King 2008 on the TV-Show Immer wieder sonntags
- Prize from smago.net, Der Arbeitsgemeinschaft Deutscher Schlager und Volksmusik e. V.
- Runner-Up at the pre-qualifiers for the Grand Prix der Volksmusik 2009
- 6th Place at the Finals of the Grand Prix der Volksmusik 2009

== Discography ==
- Maxi-CD: Santa Rosa, 2008
- Album: Ich zeig dir meine Welt. 21 August 2009
