= Rico Brizuela =

Filipino businessman and philanthropist

- Born: Uldarico V. Brizuela; July 4, 1946 (age 80)
- Other name: RVB
- Education: Mapua Institute of Technology (B.S.)
- Occupation: Businessman

Uldarico 'Rico' Brizuela (born July 4, 1946) is a Filipino businessman and philanthropist. He is a member of the Brizuela clan of Pili, Camarines Sur, Philippines. He established one of the country’s most comprehensive logistics operations, the AAI Group of Companies (formerly known as Airlift Asia Inc.) He graduated from the Mapua Institute of Technology with a Bachelor of Science degree in electrical engineering.

Brizuela co-founded the freight forwarding company, Airlift Asia, Inc. in 1980 with Saturnino Belen and Gary Miller. Taking advantage of the export boom in semiconductors and electronics, Airlift Asia gained a reputation as an air cargo logistics company.

== Education ==
Brizuela graduated from Mapua Institute of Technology with a Bachelor of Science degree in Electrical Engineering in 1969. He took up post graduate studies in Business Administration at the De La Salle University. In June 2004, he earned a Certificate in Integrated Logistics Management, International Freight Management, and Trade Facilitation Management at the Center for Continuing Education of the Ateneo de Manila University Graduate School.

== Professional life ==
After college, Brizuela landed a job as a manager at Philippine Airlines (PAL) in 1966. In 1976 he was recruited by Antonio Delgado to be the General Manager of Delgado Air Cargo. In 1980 he entered into a joint venture partnership with Saturnino Belen, owner of Airlift Asia, Inc. Brizuela sought the help of Gary Miller — a freight forwarder based in San Francisco — to raise the needed capital for the joint venture.

He was president of the Philippine International Sea freight Forwarders Association (PISFA) for a 2-year term starting 2005 up to 2007.

=== Awards and recognitions ===
As a result of Brizuela's pioneering work in the Philippine logistic industry he has been awarded by the Global Cargo Carriers, Inc., a local association of international airlines, with a Lifetime Achievement Award (November 2004), which is "in recognition of his leadership in the Philippine airfreight cargo forwarding industry and his invaluable and exemplary contribution to its betterment and growth."

He was a finalist in Ernst & Young’s annual “Entrepreneur of the Year Philippines 2005.” In 2011, he was conferred by the Mapua Institute of Technology and the National Association of Mapua Alumni with “The Outstanding Mapuan (TOM) Award" in the specialized field of Entrepreneurship.
