= AAI Group of Companies =

Logistics company

- Type: Private
- Industry: Logistics, Cargo Handling, Air Freight
- Founded: 1979
- Founder: Uldarico Brizuela
- Headquarters: Parañaque, Metro Manila, Philippines
- Area served: Worldwide
- Services: Logistic solutions, Warehousing, Cargo handling
- Divisions: AAI Worldwide Logistics, Inc.; A2Z Logistics, Inc.; AAI+Peers; Black Arrow Express; AAI Charity

AAI Group of Companies is one of the largest Filipino-owned logistics company. It has a network that includes five separate logistics corporations, namely AAI Worldwide Logistics Inc., A2Z logistics Inc., Black Arrow Express, AAI+Peers, and AAI Charity. AAI Group's main base of operations is in Metro Manila, Philippines, with facilities for warehousing, distribution hubs and equipment pools throughout the country.

== Divisions ==
AAI Group comprises five corporations:

- AAI Worldwide Logistics Inc.

It was established in 1979 by Saturnino Belen as Airlift Asia, Inc. In 1980, Belen formed a partnership with Uldarico Brizuela, which helped expand the company's operations.

- A2Z logistics, Inc.
- AAI+Peers
- Black Arrow Express
- AAI Charity
