= Parañaque River =

Parañaque River Tambo River
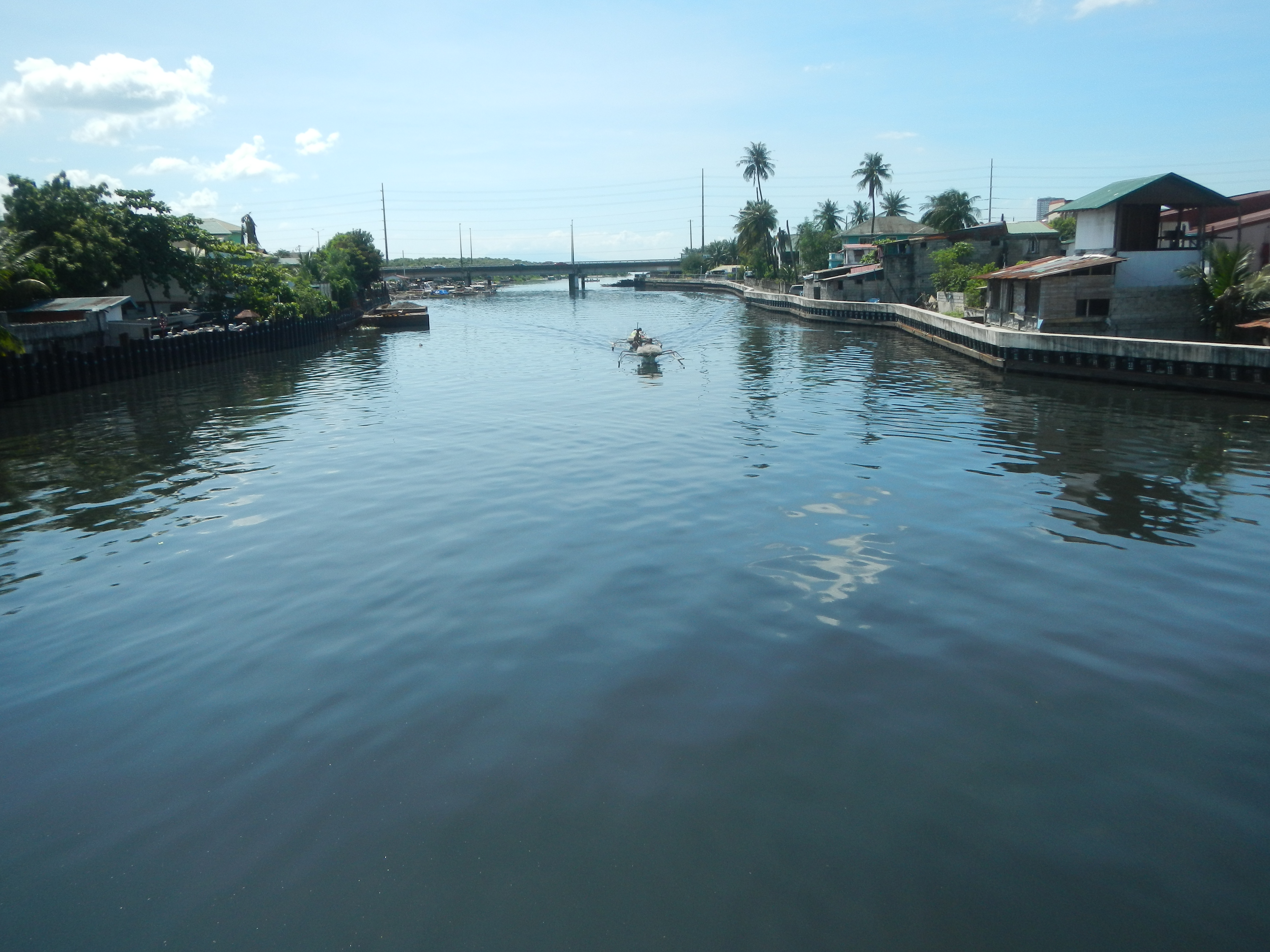
- The Parañaque River near its mouth in Manila Bay between barangays La Huerta (left) and Don Galo (right) before the construction of the LRT-1 Cavite Extension

- Parañaque River mouth Parañaque River (Philippines)
- Native name: Ilog ng Parañaque (Tagalog)

Location
- Country: Philippines
- Region: National Capital Region
- Cities: Pasay; Parañaque

Physical characteristics
- Source
  - location: National Capital Region
- Mouth: Manila Bay
  - location: Parañaque
  - coordinates: 14°30′8.4″N 120°59′21.3″E
  - elevation: 0 m (0 ft)
- Discharge
  - location: Manila Bay

The Parañaque River (Tagalog: Ilog ng Parañaque), also known as the Tambo River, is a river in Metro Manila in the Philippines. It is located south of Manila passing through Pasay and Parañaque located near Ninoy Aquino International Airport. The river exits Manila Bay between the barangays of Don Galo and La Huerta just north of the Parañaque Cathedral.

== See also ==
- List of rivers and esteros in Manila
