= Pasay Harbor City =

Reclamation area in Pasay, Philippines

- Location within the Philippines
- Coordinates: 14°32′55″N 120°56′51″E
- Country: Philippines
- City: Pasay

Area
  - Total: 2.65 km^{2} (1.02 sq mi)

Pasay Harbor City is a reclaimed area on Manila Bay. It is under the jurisdiction of Pasay, Philippines.

== Background ==
The Pasay City Government entered into a contractual Joint Venture Agreement (JWA) with Pasay Harbor City Corporation (PHCC), a special purpose corporation that will engage in a 265-hectare (650-acre) land reclamation on the municipal waters of the city. It was approved by the Philippine Competition Commission in September 2019.

Pasay Harbor City Corporation is a partnership composed of Udenna Development Corporation, Ulticon Builders Inc., and China Harbour Engineering Company.

== Development ==
The proposed reclamation project, called the Pasay Harbour Reclamation Project, encompasses 265 hectares (650 acres), including two (2) islands with respective areas of 210 hectares (520 acres) for Island A and 55 hectares (140 acres) for Island.

== Construction ==
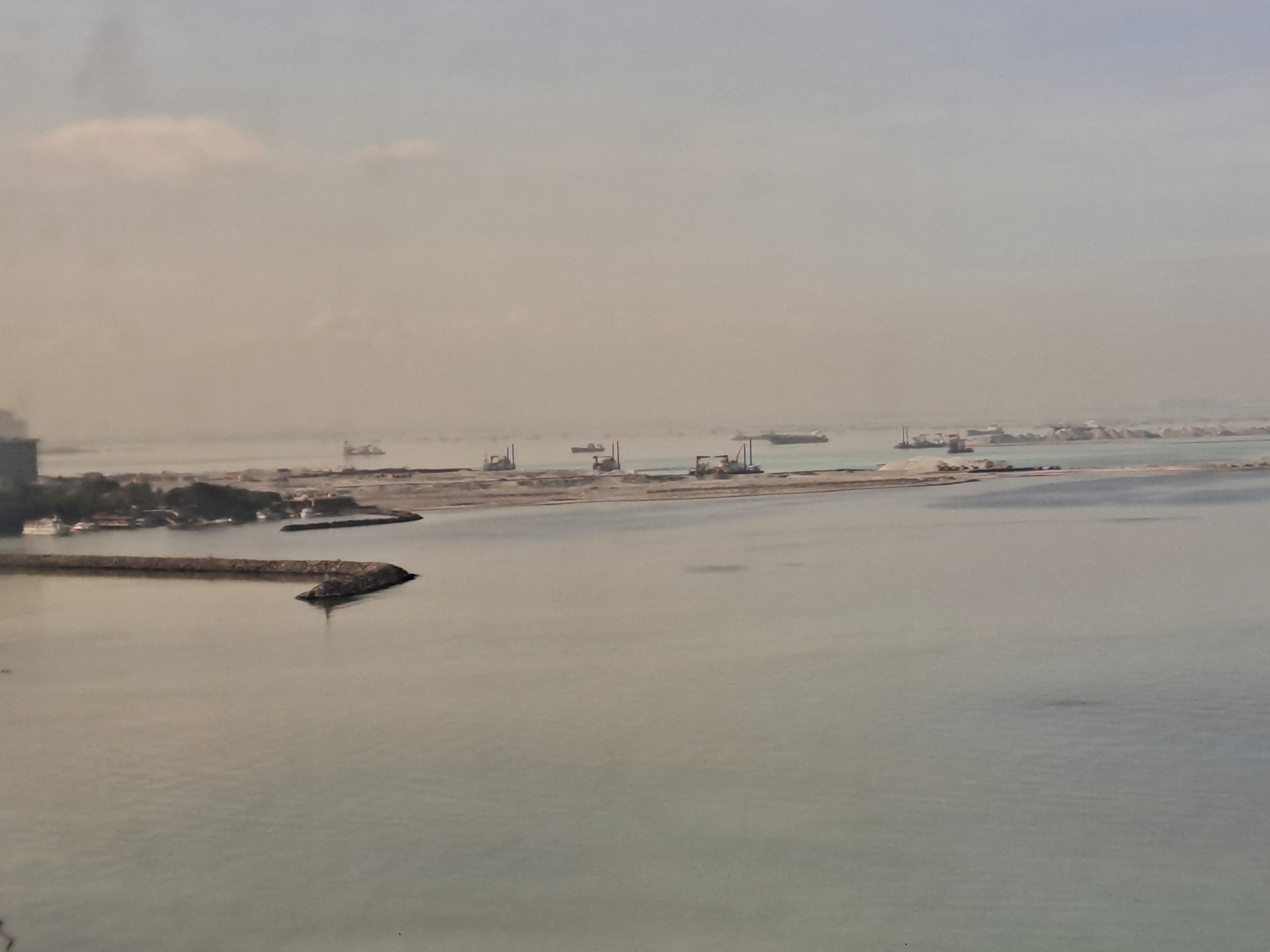
Construction of the reclamation areas in November 2023

As of July 19, 2022, about 117 hectares (290 acres) of land has been reclaimed. Horizontal developments, including roads, bridges, power, water, drainage, sewerage, communications and other utilities and facilities are targeted to be completed on 2028.

Royal Boskalis was in-charge of the dredging and land reclamation environment, after the proponents of Pasay Harbor City dropped their Chinese partner.

== See also ==
- Land reclamation in Metro Manila
  - Bay City
  - Horizon Manila
  - Manila Solar City
  - Manila Waterfront City
  - Navotas Boulevard Business Park
