= Land reclamation in Metro Manila =

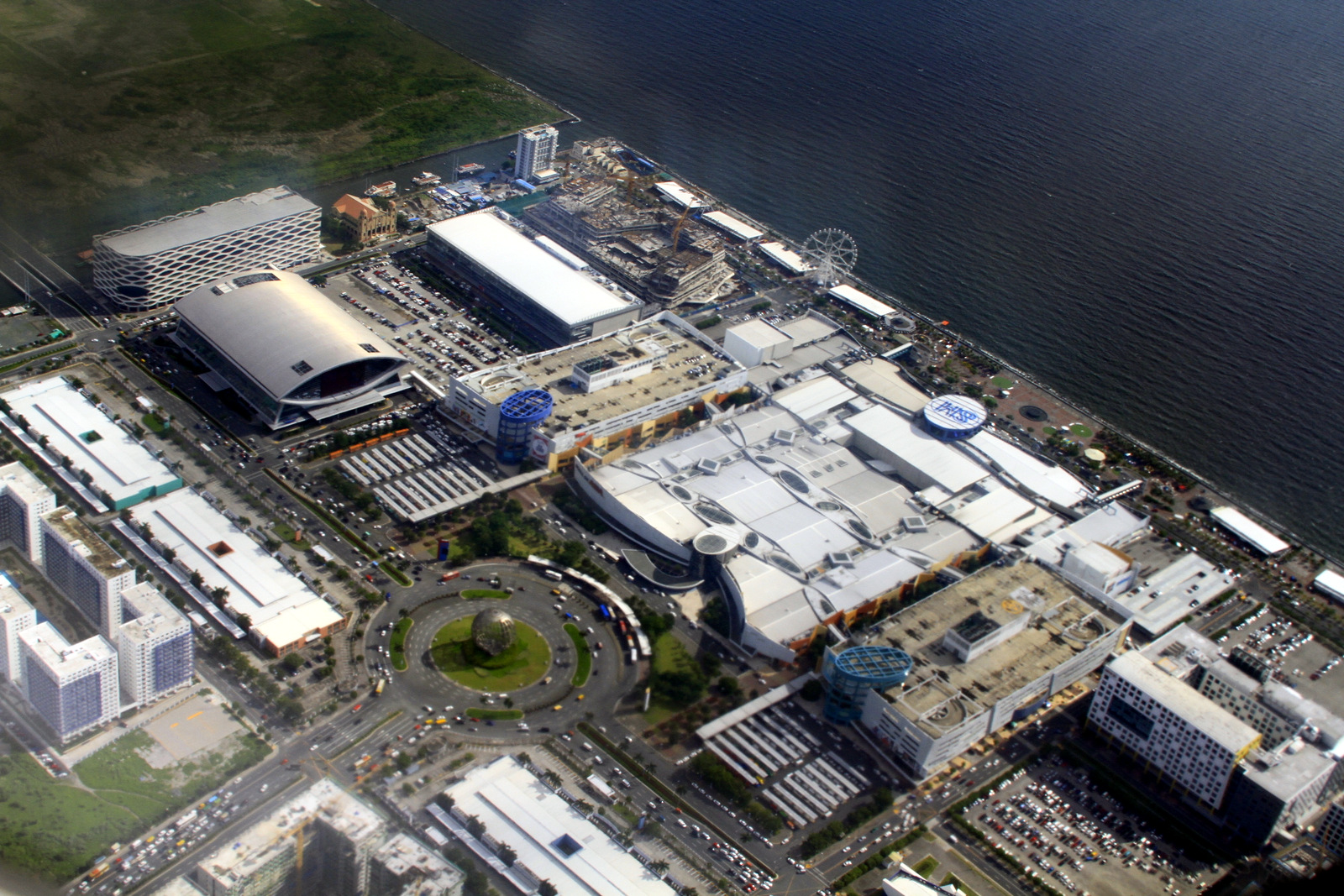
Aerial view of the SM Mall of Asia Complex in Bay City, Metro Manila (c. 2014).

The reclamation of land from the surrounding waters of Metro Manila is used to expand the region's limited area of usable and natural land. There are about 25 projects that aim to reclaim more than 10,000 hectares (100 km^{2}) of land in Manila Bay from the city of Navotas to the province of Cavite. Reclamation projects have been met with opposition and criticism, especially from environmental groups.

== History ==
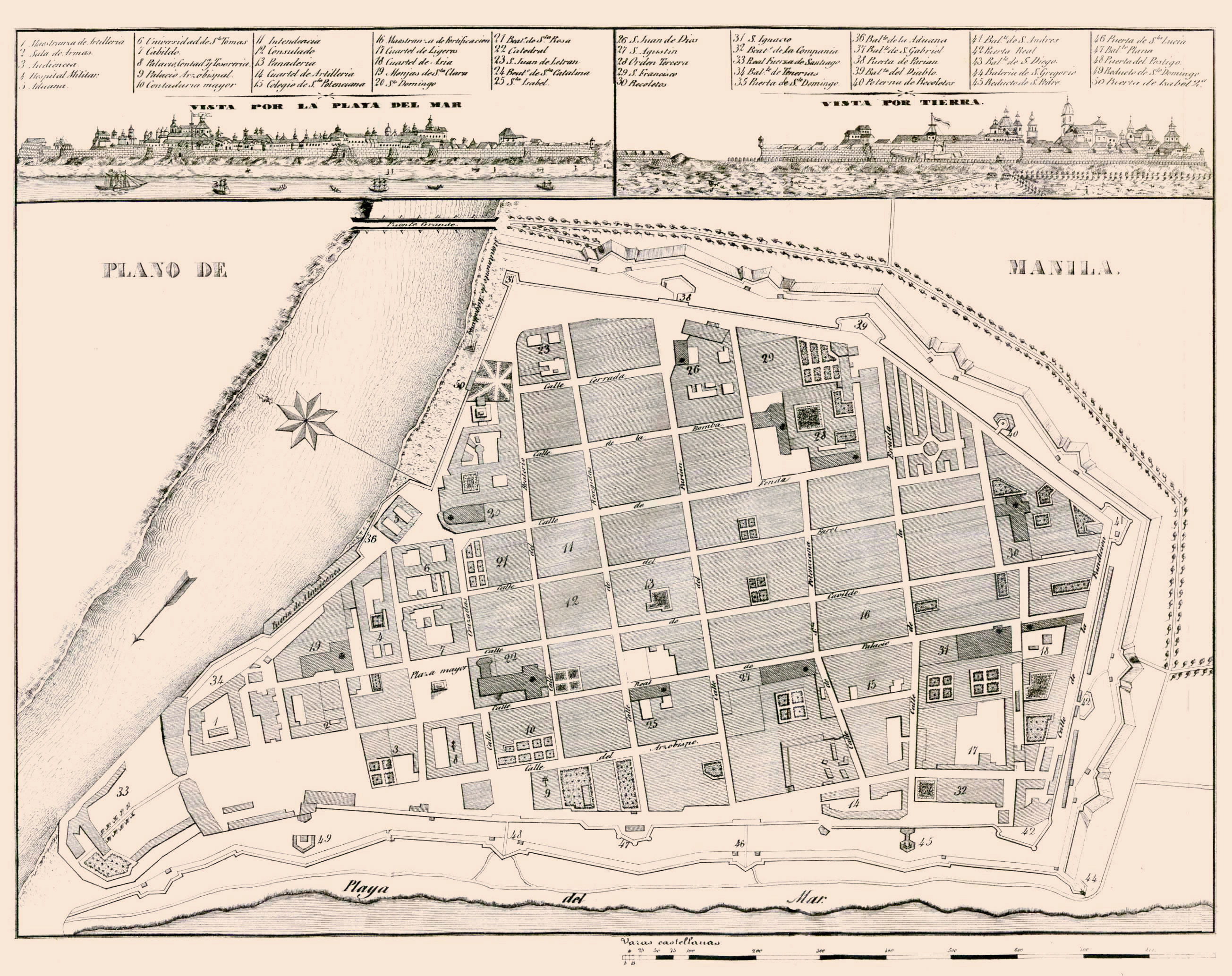
An 1851 map of Intramuros showing the coastlines before the land reclamation in the early 20th century.

The early reclamation within the City of Manila began in the late 19th century during the Spanish colonial period when the construction of the Manila South Port subsequently moved the coastline westward and obscured Intramuros from the bay. The moat surrounding the fortifications was drained and turned into a recreational golf course by the American colonial government in the early 1900s. Post-war period saw the reclamation for the construction of the Manila North Port as additional facilities were built.

In 1977, First Lady Imelda Marcos commenced the construction of Bay City in line with her City of Man project. The Public Estates Authority (now Philippine Reclamation Authority) was created to manage the project. The plan was to reclaim 3,000 hectares (30 km^{2}) of land in Manila Bay. However, only 660 hectares (6.6 km^{2}) were built encompassing the cities of Pasay, Parañaque and a small portion that lies within Manila. Among the major developments in Bay City are the Cultural Center of the Philippines Complex, Central Business Park (SM Central Business Park and the Metropolitan Park), Aseana City, Entertainment City, and the Asiaworld compound.

In 2017, the Manila city government announced that it had approved four reclamation projects: the New Manila Bay International Community (407.43 hectares), Solar City (148 hectares), the Manila Harbour Centre expansion (50 hectares), Horizon Manila (419 hectares) and the 318 hectares Manila Waterfront City. In 2019, the Pasay city government approved two reclamation projects: the 265 hectare Pasay Harbor Reclamation Project and another 360 hectare reclamation project connected to the SM Mall of Asia Complex. Out of the 25 proposed reclamation projects, the Philippine Reclamation Authority only approved six: Horizon Manila (Manila), Manila Waterfront City (Manila), the Navotas City Coastal Bay Reclamation Project (Navotas), Pasay Harbor Reclamation Project, Pasay 360 also known as SM Smart City (Pasay), and the Solar City (Manila). Horizon Manila is slated for construction in the first half of 2025.

== Built ==
Project	Area	Cost	Developer	Construction	Completion date	Location	Ref.
Manila Bay Freeport Zone (Bay City)	660 hectares (6.6 km^{2})		Philippine Reclamation Authority		1986	Manila, Pasay, and Parañaque	
Manila Multipurpose Terminal (formerly Manila Harbour Centre)	79 hectares (0.79 km^{2})		R-II Builders			Manila	
Port of Manila	137.5 hectares (1.375 km^{2})		Philippine Ports Authority			Manila	

=== Bay City ===
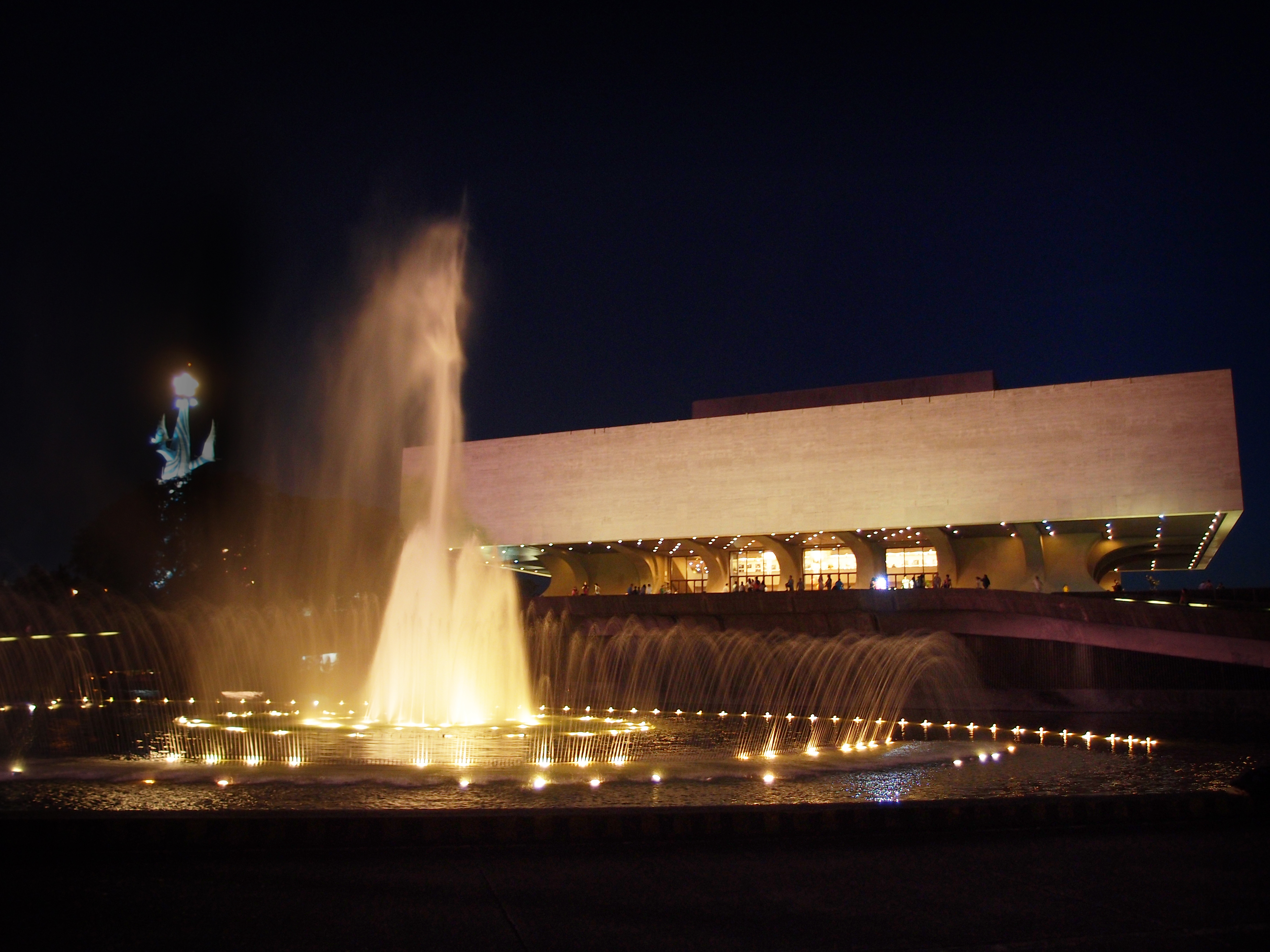
The Cultural Center of the Philippines Complex in Bay City, Metro Manila.

Bay City or the Manila Bay Freeport Zone is the 660-hectare (6.6 km^{2}) reclamation area that is split between the cities of Manila and Pasay on the north side and Parañaque on the south. The original plan was to reclaim 3,000 hectares (30 km^{2}) of land in Manila Bay. It is known for the 77-hectare (0.77 km^{2}) Cultural Center of the Philippines Complex, the SM Mall of Asia Complex, the Aseana City business park, integrated resorts and casino complex such as the City of Dreams Manila, Okada Manila and Solaire Resort & Casino, and the Asiaworld compound where the Parañaque Integrated Terminal Exchange is situated.

=== Manila Harbour Centre ===
The 79-hectare (0.79 km^{2}) Manila Harbour Centre is a mixed-use industrial estate and shipping facility located north of the Port of Manila (Manila North Harbor). It contains several industrial and commercial developments, as well as port and port-related facilities. A 50-hectare land reclamation expansion was approved by the Manila City Government in 2017.

=== Port of Manila ===
The 137.5-hectare (1.375 km^{2}) Port of Manila is entirely built up of reclaimed land. The port includes the Manila North Harbor, Manila South Harbor and the Manila International Container Terminal. It is located in the districts of Tondo and Port Area. It also includes the community Baseco, which is largely located on Engineer's Island.

== Under-construction ==
Project name	Area	Cost	Developer	Construction started	Completion date	Location	Ref.
Navotas City Coastal Bay Reclamation Project	650 hectares (6.5 km^{2})	₱57.4 billion	Navotas city government	2019		Navotas	
Horizon Manila	419 hectares (4.19 km^{2})	₱100 billion	Manila city government, JBROS Construction Corp.	2023	2027–2029	Manila	
Manila Solar City	148 hectares (1.48 km^{2})		Manila city government, Manila Goldcoast Development Corp.	2023		Manila	
Manila Waterfront City	318 hectares (3.18 km^{2})	₱34.377 billion	Manila city government, Waterfront Manila Premier Development Inc	2026	2028	Manila	
Pasay Harbor City	265 hectares (2.65 km^{2})		Pasay city government, Pasay Harbor City Corp.	2022	2028	Pasay	
Pasay 360	360 hectares (3.6 km^{2})		Pasay city government, SM Smart City Infrastructure and Development Corporation	2022	2028	Pasay	

=== Navotas City Coastal Bay Reclamation Project ===
The 650-hectare (6.5 km^{2}) reclamation project in Navotas was approved in by the Philippine Reclamation Authority in 2018. It is envisioned to create a mixed-use community with residential, institutional, commercial and industrial areas suitable for port facilities, marine and tourism. It is the only reclamation project that is currently being implemented.

=== Horizon Manila ===
Horizon Manila is an upcoming mixed-use planned community to be built on a 419-hectare (4.19 km^{2}) reclaimed land in Manila. It was approved by the Philippine Reclamation Authority in 2019 and construction will commence on the second half of 2023.

=== Manila Solar City ===
Manila Solar City is 148-hectare (1.48 km^{2}) reclamation project to be built through a joint venture between the City Government of Manila and the Manila Goldcoast Development Corporation. It would contain a mixed-use township that was planned in the 1990s but was stalled several times. It was finally approved by the city government of Manila in 2017. The notice to proceed for to mobilize and commence actual reclamation works was approved by the Philippine Reclamation Authority on February 22, 2021.

=== Manila Waterfront City ===
A joint venture between the City of Manila and Waterfront Philippines Inc., which will entail the reclamation of 318 hectares of land located westward from Rizal Park and extending up to the breakwater of Manila South Harbor. It is the second biggest reclamation project in Manila after Horizon Manila and is envisioned to become the financial center of the city. It was approved by the City Government of Manila in 2017. The project received the approval of the Philippine Competition Commission in March 2021. The notice to proceed for to mobilize and commence actual reclamation works was approved by the Philippine Reclamation Authority on August 29, 2022.

=== Pasay Harbor City ===
The Pasay Harbor City would entail the reclamation of 265-hectare (2.65 km^{2}) of land on the city's municipal waters. The project is a joint venture of the Pasay city government and Pasay Harbor City Corp., It was approved in 2019.

=== Pasay 360 ===
In 2019, the proposal by SM Smart City Infrastructure and Development Corporation to reclaim 360-hectare (3.6 km^{2}) of land and build a mixed-use township on the city's municipal waters was approved. It will be connected to the SM Mall of Asia Complex in Bay City.

== Planned and/or proposed ==
Metro Manila has multitude of reclamation projects in varying stages of development:

- Baseco Reclamation Project: a planned 40-hectare reclamation project proposed by Chinese-Filipino consortium UAA Kinming located west of Engineer's Island, and before the planned 407-hectare reclamation of the same developer.
- BRADI Smart Harbor Manila: a 200-hectare reclamation project proposed by the Baseco Rehabilitation and Development, Inc. (BRADI), which is still in the application stage.
- Laguna Lakeshore Expressway Dike: a proposed expressway dike that would start from the coastal area of Laguna de Bay from Taguig in Metro Manila to Calamba and Los Baños in Laguna. The project would involve the reclamation of 700 hectares of land west of and abutting the expressway-dike, separated from the shoreline by a 100–150-meter channel in the cities of Taguig and Muntinlupa.
- Manila Harbour Centre expansion: a 50 hectare reclamation project west of the existing 79-hectare Manila Harbor Center. It was approved by the Manila City Government in 2016, pending the approval of national government agencies.
- New Manila Bay–City of Pearl: also known as the Baseco Reclamation Project and the New Manila Bay International Community. It is a 407-hectare reclamation project and a mixed-use planned township proposed by UAA Kinming. It was approved by the City Government of Manila in 2017.
- Parañaque Reclamation Project: The Parañaque City Government proposed its own reclamation project which will be built upon 286.86 hectares of reclaimed land along the municipal waters of the city.
- Parañaque Reclamation Project: The Parañaque City Government proposed its own reclamation project which will be built upon 274.23 hectares of reclaimed land along the municipal waters of the city.
- Pasay Reclamation Project: a 260-hectare, which is still in the application stage.

== Seabed quarry ==
Currently, there are five approved seabed quarry permits issued by the Philippine Government for utilization of marine sediment as construction materials for the Metro Manila reclamation projects and New Manila International Airport in Bulacan.

Permit holder	Permit area (ha)	Location in terms of Municipal Waters	Operator	Transporter	Land reclamation project site
Philippine Reclamation Authority	5,000	Naic, Tanza, Ternate, and Rosario, Cavite	City Government of Pasay/SM Smart City Infrastructure Development Corporation	China Harbour Engineering Company; Boskalis	Pasay Harbor City
V.I.L Mines Inc./San Miguel Aerocity Inc.	5,000	Rosario, Tanza, Naic, and Ternate, Cavite		Boskalis	New Manila International Airport
Avalar Mining Corporation	Parcel 1 (1,651), Parcel 2 (3,159)	Cavite City, Noveleta, and Rosario, Cavite			Pasay 360-hectare reclamation project
Silverquest Mining Resources, Inc.	2124.3581	Naic, and Ternate, Cavite			Manila Waterfront City
Seabed Resources, Inc.	4999	Naic, and Ternate, Cavite			Horizon Manila

== Beach nourishment ==
=== Manila Bay Dolomite Beach ===
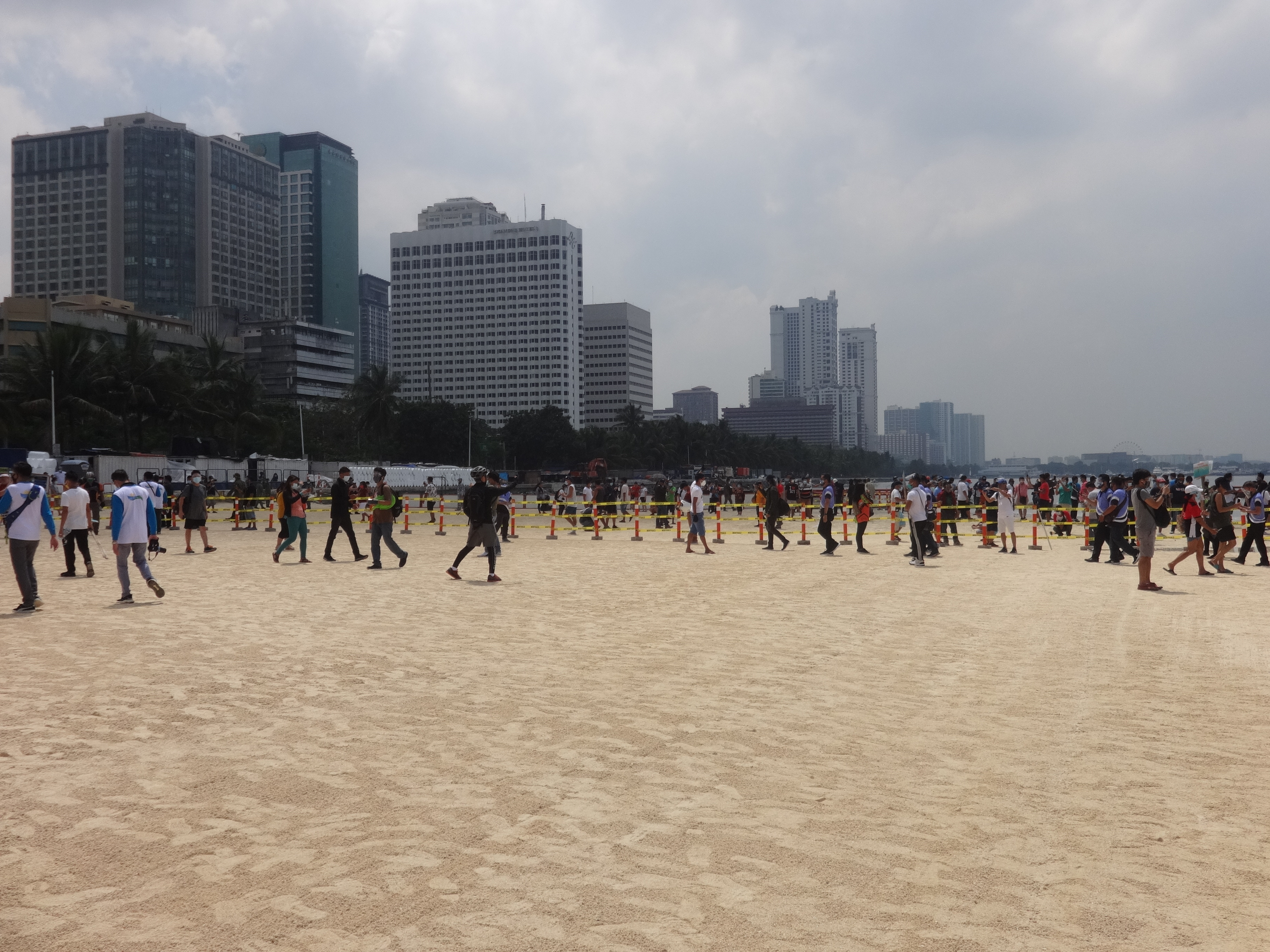
The beach during its temporary opening in September 2020.

Manila Bay Beach is a 5.4-hectare man-made beach located in Manila that was created through the process of beach nourishment. It is situated along Manila Bay and is part of an overall integrated coastal zone management aimed at coastal defense of the Manila Bay rehabilitation. When completed, the beach will cover a total length of 900 meters of the Manila Baywalk. The beach was met with criticism when it was built, owing to the timing that it was constructed amidst the COVID-19 pandemic and concerns of adverse environmental effects caused by dumping dolomite on the polluted Manila Bay. Environment Secretary Roy Cimatu said that the public supported the project and the Department of Environment and Natural Resources said the project improved the environment surrounding it, including the significant drop of fecal coliform level in the waters surrounding the beach.

== Additional information ==
Project	Location	Total area added		Cost
Project	City/municipality	Hectares	Square kilometers	
Manila Bay Freeport Zone (Bay City)	Pasay, Parañaque and Manila	660 hectares	6.6 km^{2}	
Manila Harbour Centre	Manila	79 hectares	0.79 km^{2}	
Port of Manila	Manila	137.5 hectares	1.375 km^{2}	
Total		876.5 hectares	8.76 km^{2}	
