= Bay City metropolitan area =

The Bay City metropolitan area may refer to:

- The Bay City, Michigan metropolitan area, United States
- The Bay City, Texas micropolitan area, United States

== See also ==
- Bay City (disambiguation)
