= Navotas Boulevard Business Park =

Business center in Navotas, Philippines

- Location in Metro Manila Location in Luzon Location in the Philippines
- Coordinates: 14°41′22″N 120°54′19″E
- Country: Philippines
- City: Navotas

Area
  - Total: 6.50 km^{2} (2.51 sq mi)

The Navotas Boulevard Business Park is an under-construction commercial and business center in Navotas. It will rise on 650-hectare (6.5 km^{2}) reclaimed land, and has been under-construction since 2019. The development is envisioned to create a mixed-use community with residential, institutional, commercial and industrial areas suitable for port facilities, marine and tourism. Its master plan was designed by Surbana Jurong.

== Background ==
The project was approved by the City Government of Navotas in 2015. It finally gained the Philippine Reclamation Authority in 2018. Fishermen from the city protested against the project, stating that it will displace them and their livelihood.

== Construction ==
Construction began in 2019. The Philippine Reclamation Authority was suspended in August 2023. It was resumed in 2024.

== See also ==
- Land reclamation in Metro Manila
  - Bay City
  - Horizon Manila
  - Manila Solar City
  - Manila Waterfront City
  - Pasay Harbor City
