= SS Aberdeen (1912) =

History
- Name: Aberdeen
- Owner: American Pacific Whaling Company
- Port of registry: (United States) Seattle
- Builder: Seattle Construction and Drydock Company
- Launched: 17 May 1912

General characteristics
- Tonnage: 116 GRT
- Length: 88 feet (26.8 m)
- Beam: 19 feet (5.8 m)
- Depth: 11 feet 5 inches (3.5 m)
- Propulsion: 2 cyclic triple expansion engines
- Speed: 12 knots (22 km/h; 14 mph)

Aberdeen was built by the Seattle Construction and Drydock Company in 1912 as a coastal whale catcher for the American Pacific Whaling Company operating out of Gray's Harbor from the Canada–United States border south to Cape Blanco in Oregon. The catcher was 116 GRT and 88 feet (26.8 m) in length by 19 feet (5.8 m) beam with a depth of 11 feet 5 inches (3.5 m) and ten crew. Aberdeen and a sister ship, Westport were launched in the spring of 1912 with Aberdeen operational by May 1912 and reportedly already having caught "two monster whales." In 1917 Aberdeen was inspected and found suitable for naval service and prospectively assigned identification number ID-763. No record of actual acquisition by the United States Navy has been found.

The vessel is shown active 1930 through 1945 with American Pacific Whaling Company.

== Bibliography ==
- "Lloyd's Register 1930–31" (PDF). Lloyd's Register – via Plimsoll Ship Data.
- "Lloyd's Register 1945–46" (PDF). Lloyd's Register – via Plimsoll Ship Data.
- Naval History And Heritage Command. "Aberdeen ". Dictionary of American Naval Fighting Ships. Naval History And Heritage Command.
- "Continued Activity At Yards of Seattle Construction and Drydock Co". Pacific Marine Review. 9 (May 1912). San Francisco: J.S. Hines. 1912.
- United States Bureau of Customs (1912). Merchant Vessels of the United States. Washington: United States Government Printing Office. p. 111.
- Webb, Robert Lloyd (1988). On the Northwest: Commercial Whaling in the Pacific Northwest, 1790-1967. University of British Columbia Press. p. 190. ISBN 0774802928. LCCN 89156393.
