= Bay City =

Bay City may refer to:

== Places ==
=== Australia ===
- Westfield Bay City, a shopping centre in Geelong, Victoria

=== Philippines ===
- Bay City, Metro Manila, the reclamation area of Metro Manila in the Philippines

=== United States ===
- Bay City, Pope County, Illinois
- Bay City, Michigan
  - Bay City Town Center, a shopping mall in Bay City, Michigan
- Bay City, Oregon
- Bay City, Texas
- Bay City, Washington
- Bay City, Wisconsin
- a nickname for San Francisco
- a nickname for Santa Monica, California

=== Canada ===
- a nickname for Hamilton, Ontario

=== Fictional ===
- Bay City (TV series), a 1993 Australian children's television series set in Bay City
- Bay City, a fictional midwestern town in the NBC soap Another World
- Bay City, a fictional town in the American television series Cobra
- Bay City, a place visited by Crypto in Destroy All Humans! 2, a parody of San Francisco
- Bay City, California, a community in the 1970s Starsky & Hutch television series and film
- Bay City, California, the location of the team in the 1970s minor-league baseball-themed series Bay City Blues
- Bay City, a megalopolis developed over historic San Francisco in the Netflix series Altered Carbon
- Bay City, a fictional town in the television series Renegade
- Bay City, California, a pseudonym used by Raymond Chandler in several short stories and novels; see Raymond Chandler bibliography
  - Bay City, a name of Los Angeles in 2022 film Marlowe
- Bay City, California, a community mentioned in "Exit Prentiss Carr" (the sixth episode of the first season) and "The Girl in the Bay City Boys Club" (thirteenth episode of season two) of The Rockford Files

== Other uses ==
- Bay City (album), by David Thomas
- Bay City Rollers, Scottish pop band
