= Horizon Manila =

- Location within the Philippines
- Coordinates: 14.5576538°N 120.9472076°E
- Country: Philippines
- City: Manila

Area
  - Total: 4.19 km^{2} (1.62 sq mi)
- Website: horizon-manila.com

Horizon Manila is an upcoming mixed-use planned community to be built on a 419-hectare reclaimed land in Manila Bay. It has been described as the biggest reclamation project in Manila, Philippines. Horizon Manila will be composed of three islands: Island 1 (140 hectares), Island 2 (140 hectares) and Island 3 (139 hectares). The project was approved by the Philippine Reclamation Authority in 2019 and construction will begin in the second half of 2023.

== Background ==
=== Planning and design ===
The project was proposed by the Manila City Government with a projected cost of PHP60 billion, through a joint venture with JBros Construction Corporation. A Memorandum of Understanding was signed between the City and the Philippine Reclamation Authority on June 2, 2017. The master plan for the project was designed by WTA Architecture + Design Studio, a local Filipino architecture and design firm.

The master plan calls for the creation of 28 distinct "communities" for 100,000 residents, which will be situated on three islands bisected by a 4 km long canal park. 83 hectares will be allotted for open green space, which will occupy a fifth of the project's total area. Each district is planned to have its own development guidelines.

The project consortium allotted PHP109 billion for the reclamation and construction of roads. 34 hectares will be allotted for the use and disposition of the city. Around 400,000 jobs are expected to be generated for the project.

=== Approval and pending construction ===
The project received the approval of the Philippine Reclamation Authority in December 2019. By the first week of October 2020, JBros Construction Corp. confirmed that all the necessary permits have been secured, including the Environmental Compliance Certificate. In March 2021, the project gained the approval of the Philippine Competition Commission (PCC), the second reclamation project to be approved by PCC after the planned Manila Waterfront City. In February 2022, President Rodrigo Duterte approved to allow the reclamation project.

Construction will begin at the second half of 2023, and it will take six to eight years to complete. It was suspended in August 2023. Its Original Amended Environmental Compliance Certificate (ECC), along with Manila Waterfront City, was turned over to the Manila city government in November 2026.

== Districts ==
- Arts and Culture District: The district will contain a contemporary arts museum.
- Market Square: It will anchor the commercial and retail developments of Horizon Manila.
- Villa District: The first community district at Horizon Manila. It will contain a school, church, library, skate park and an e-sports arena.

== Transportation ==
A monorail system is planned to connect the islands from mainland Manila. Other planned modes of transportation include trackless electric trams, ferries and water taxis. Stops and stations are evenly mapped out to become about only 400 meters away from each other, ensuring that each and every place of the city is reachable within 15–20 minutes.

== See also ==
- Land reclamation in Metro Manila
  - Bay City
  - Manila Solar City
  - Manila Waterfront City
  - Navotas Boulevard Business Park
  - Pasay Harbor City
