= Manila Solar City =

Manila Solar City (Solar City Manila)
- Location within the Philippines
- Coordinates: 14.5581837°N 120.9736913°E
- Country: Philippines
- City: Manila

Area
  - Total: 1.48 km^{2} (0.57 sq mi)
- Website: manilagoldcoast.com

Manila Solar City (also known as Solar City Manila) is an under-construction mixed-used development to be built on a 148 hectare reclaimed land in Manila Bay adjacent to the north of the Cultural Center of the Philippines Complex and west of the Manila Yacht Club. It will be developed by the consortium of the Manila Goldcoast Development Corporation and the City of Manila.

== Background ==
The Manila Goldcoast Development Corporation is a part of the Tieng family-led Solar Group of Companies, which was involved in entertainment, satellite communications, merchandising, aviation, and property development.

The project was proposed in 1991 as the Manila Goldcoast Reclamation Project (MGRP), which secured a greenlight from the Philippine Estates Authority (now the Philippine Reclamation Authority) to pursue the project as the Manila-Cavite Coastal Road Reclamation-North Sector Reclamation Project (MCCRR-North Sector Reclamation). Several environmental groups, however, opposed the project and in 1993 the Manila City Council passed Ordinance no. 7777, effectively banning all reclamation projects in Manila Bay. The ordinance was reversed on 2011 by City Ordinance no. 8233, lifting the ban on reclamation. The City of Manila also entered in a consortium agreement with the Manila Goldcoast Development Corporation for the development of the project. In the same year, on March 31, 2011, the Philippine Reclamation Authority affirmed the “previous award of the MCCRR-North Sector Reclamation Project to Manila Goldcoast Development Corp.”.

In February 2019, Malacañang granted clearance for the project through Executive Order (EO) 543 series of 2006 and EO No. 74 series of 2019, as well as succeeding representations made by the Philippine Reclamation Authority on the completion of documentary requirements and concurrences of the relevant government agencies. The development is expected to generate PHP 50 billion in revenues and create 500,000 additional jobs once the PRA issues a notice to proceed to the project.

=== Construction ===
The Philippine Reclamation Authority issued on February 22, 2021, the Notice to Mobilize (NTM) and the Notice to Commence Actual Construction Works (NTCACW) to the consortium of MGDC and the City of Manila.

Construction was targeted to start in the early 2019, but dredging and reclamation works only began in January 2023. It was suspended in August 2023.

== Opposition and criticism ==
Several environmental groups, such as the Climate Reality Project, voiced opposition towards the project because it may threaten the biodiversity of Manila Bay. Instead, they propose that the government should seek the rehabilitation and improvement of the bay, before focusing on any reclamation projects.

== See also ==
- Land reclamation in Metro Manila
  - Bay City
  - Horizon Manila
  - Manila Waterfront City
  - Navotas Boulevard Business Park
  - Pasay Harbor City
