= Manila Waterfront City =

Planned development project in Manila, Philippines

- Country: Philippines
- City: Manila

Area
  - Total: 3.18 km^{2} (1.23 sq mi)

Manila Waterfront City is an under-construction land reclamation that is envisioned to be the financial center of the Manila, Philippines. At 318 hectares, it is the second largest land reclamation project in the city after Horizon Manila. It is a joint-venture between the Manila City Government and Waterfront Manila Premier Development Inc. (WMPDI).

== Background ==
Manila Waterfront City will contain a central business district (CBD), a marina, as well as health, education and entertainment hubs.

== History ==
=== Approval and construction ===
In March 2021, the project gained the approval of the Philippine Competition Commission (PCC), the first reclamation project to be approved by PCC. On August 18, 2022, the Philippine Reclamation Authority granted the request of WMPDI to start its reclamation works. On February 22, 2023, National Mapping and Resource Information Authority (NAMRIA) released an advisory about the start of sand piling works from February 21, 2023 to August 19, 2023, thereby officially starting the MWC's land reclamation works.

In August 2023, President Bongbong Marcos suspended indefinitely the reclamation projects in Manila Bay, citing the need to review their compliance to environmental laws, as well as heeding the call by the nearby US Embassy to oppose the project. By June 2026, the PRA lifted the suspension on Manila Waterfront City, and stated the project is still in pre-reclamation compliance, including nationality requirements for contractors. The project was officially launched on October 12, 2026, with Manila Mayor Isko Moreno joining the inaugural ceremony.

Its Original Amended Environmental Compliance Certificate (ECC), along with Horizon Manila, was turned over to the Manila city government in November 2026.

== Opposition ==
The US Embassy in Manila has opposed the project as it would eventually surround the embassy compound, citing reasons such as worsening the flooding around the embassy and the detrimental effects to American interests and reputation of the China-backed project.

== See also ==
- Land reclamation in Metro Manila
  - Bay City
  - Horizon Manila
  - Manila Solar City
  - Navotas Boulevard Business Park
