= Bay City, Washington =

Unincorporated community in Washington state, United States

- Unincorporated community
- Location within Washington (state) Location within the United States
- Coordinates: 46°51′52″N 124°03′34″W
- Country: United States
- State: Washington
- County: Grays Harbor
- Established: 1884
- Elevation: 39 ft (12 m)
- Time zone: UTC-8 (Pacific (PST))
  - Summer (DST): UTC-7 (PDT)
- Area code(s): 360, 564
- GNIS feature ID: 1503208

Bay City is an unincorporated community in Grays Harbor County, in the U.S. state of Washington.

== History ==
A post office called Bay City was established in 1884. The community was named for nearby South Bay. It was the site of an American Pacific Whaling Company station, which was established in the early twentieth century for the purpose of rendering blubber into whale oil.
