= Aseana City =

Central business district in Parañaque, Philippines

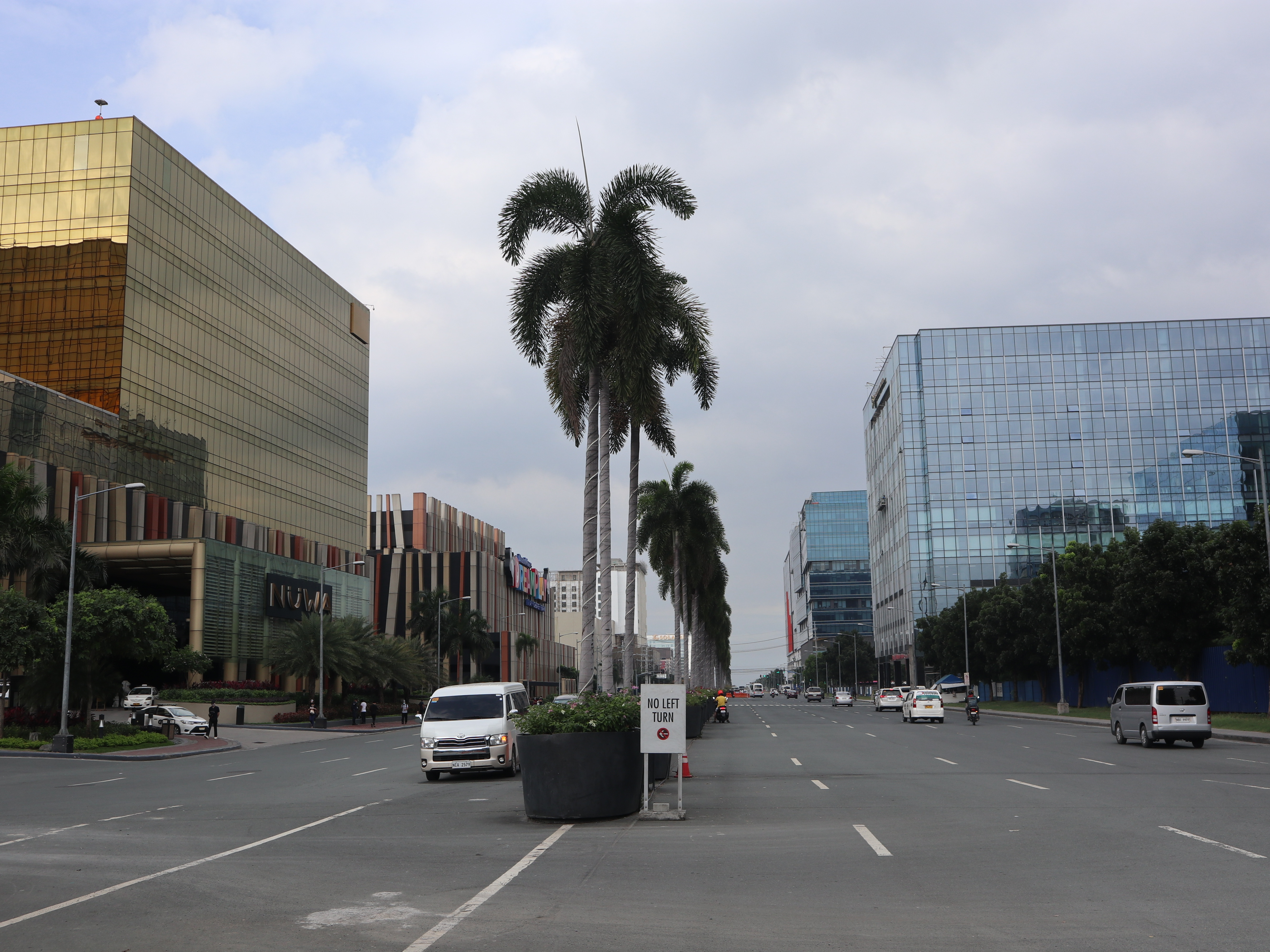
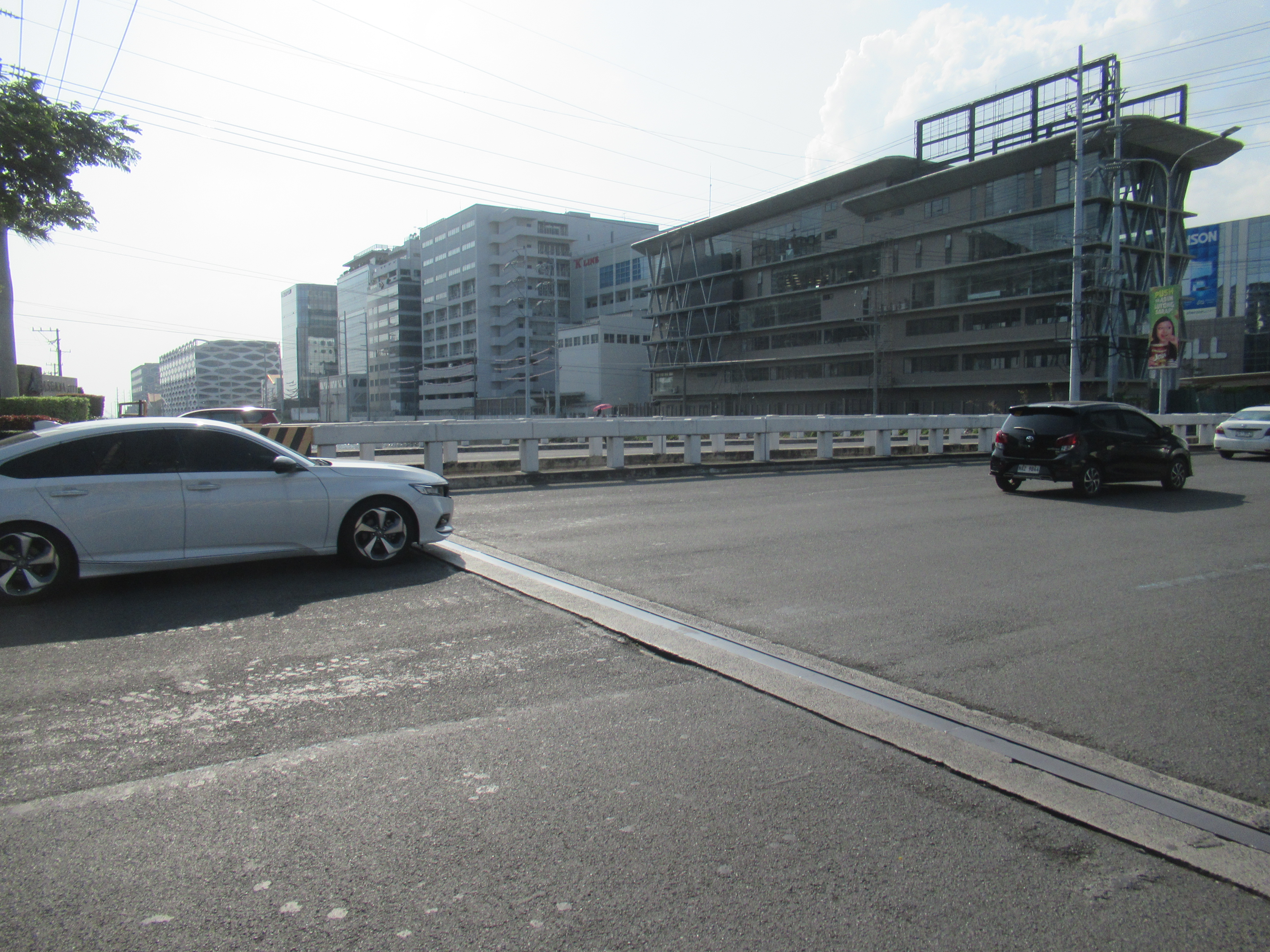
- From top, clockwise: Aseana Avenue, Aseana Ave. Bridge, Ayala Malls Manila Bay

Project
- Opening date: 2008; 18 years ago
- Developer: Aseana Holdings
- Owner: D.M. Wenceslao & Associates
- Website: aseanacity.com

Physical features
- Transport: Redemptorist-Aseana; E City of Dreams / Ayala Malls Manila Bay

Location
- Location in Metro Manila Location in Luzon Location in the Philippines
- Coordinates: 14°31′40″N 120°59′19″E
- Country: Philippines
- Region: Metro Manila
- City: Parañaque
- Barangay: Baclaran and Tambo
- Location: Parañaque, Metro Manila, Philippines

Aseana City (also known as Aseana Business Park) is a 204-hectare (500-acre) mixed-use central business district development located in Parañaque, Metro Manila, Philippines. Owned and developed by D.M. Wenceslao & Associates (DMWAI) through Aseana Holdings, it is situated in the centermost portion of the Central Business Park (alongside PAGCOR's Entertainment City) between the SM business complex in the north and Asiaworld in the south within the Bay City area. Since 2026, it has been officially under the shared jurisdiction of Barangay Baclaran to the north and Barangay Tambo to the south, with Aseana Avenue acting as the divider.

== Development ==
DMWAI was awarded by the Philippine Reclamation Authority to occupy the CBP I-B and I-C lots as the Aseana Business Park. The project began in 2008.

The development occupies 4-hectare (9.9-acre) Neo-Chinatown, Aseana 1 to 3 office buildings, Singapore School Manila, Nord Anglia International School Manila, Ayala Malls Manila Bay, Parqal Mall, and the Office of Consular Affairs (OCA, colloquially "Passport Center") of the Department of Foreign Affairs. City of Dreams Manila, one of Entertainment City's integrated resort and casinos, is also situated within the development.

Other places located in Aseana City are the Aseana Power Station, Aseana Square, and the St. John Paul II Chapel. Aseana City will also be the location of an upcoming satellite campus of the De La Salle–College of Saint Benilde.

== Controversy ==
In June 2013, Alphaland owner Roberto Ongpin received a court order from the Makati Regional Trial Court to deliver the 10-hectare (25-acre) marina project with Aseana, despite he refused to pay his dues. DMWAI, however, refused to sign the loan documents related to mortgage, which led to its cancellation of their joint-venture with Alphaland.

== Events ==
- On April 9, 2016, American rapper Kanye West headlined the Paradise International Music Festival (alongside Rudimental, Afrojack and Austin Mahone) at the Aseana Concert Grounds.
- On November 28, 2026, the PLUS63 Festival is set to be held at the Aseana City Concert Grounds. It is headlined by American singer Khalid, along with the British rock band Wolf Alice and DJ trio/group Cash Cash.

== Gallery ==
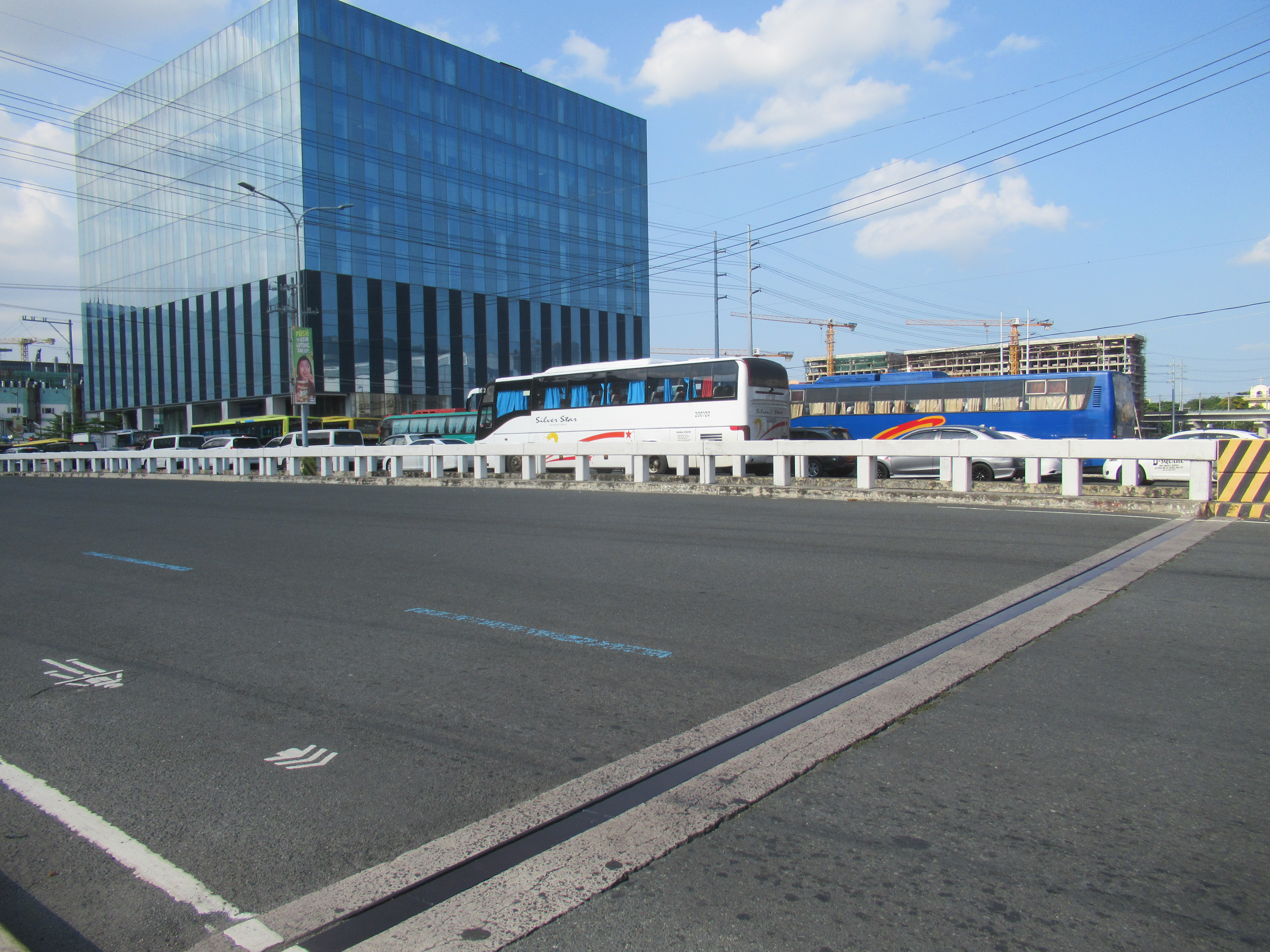
Asean Avenue Bridge

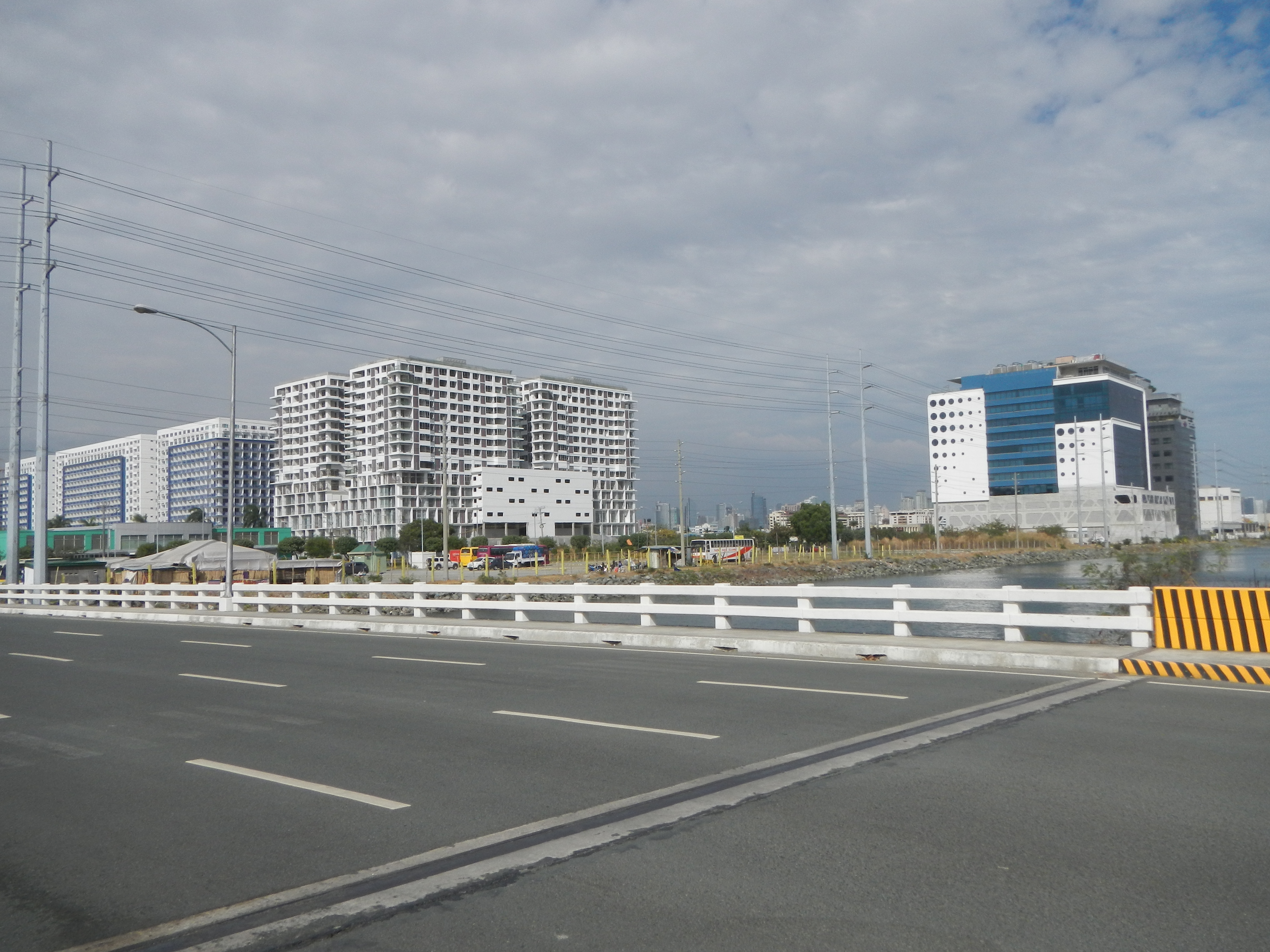
Redemptorist Bridge

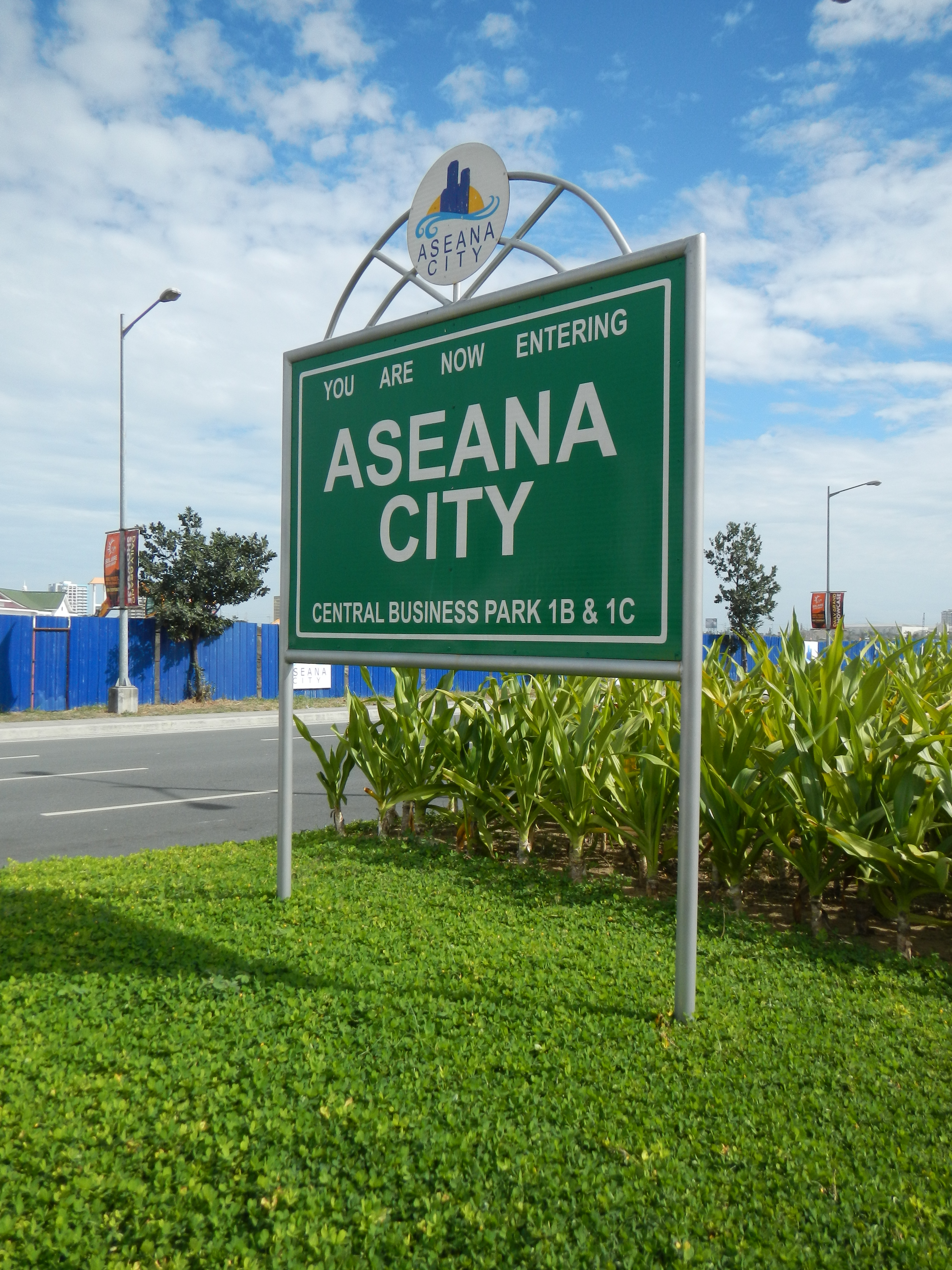
Welcome sign

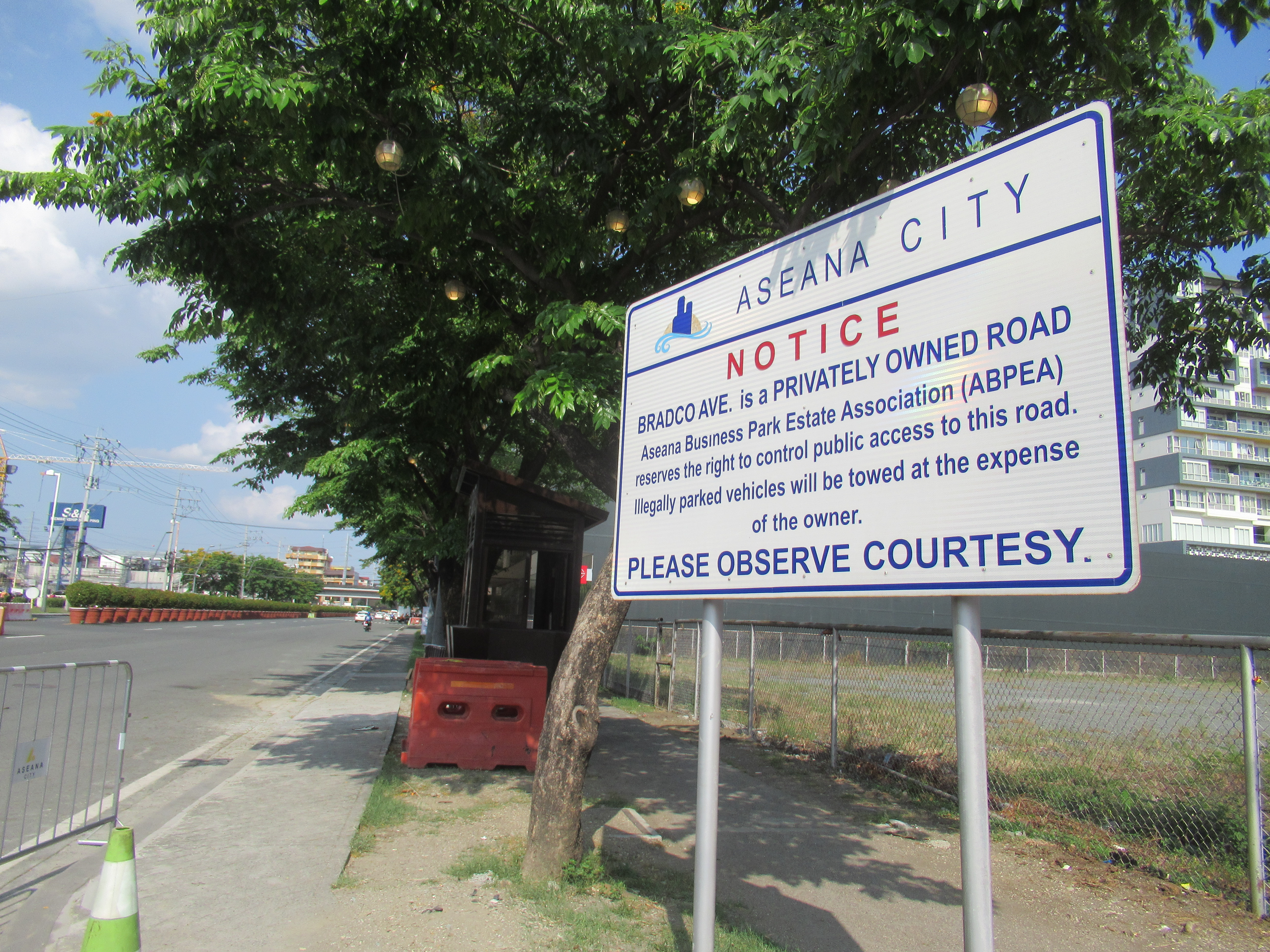
Bradco Avenue

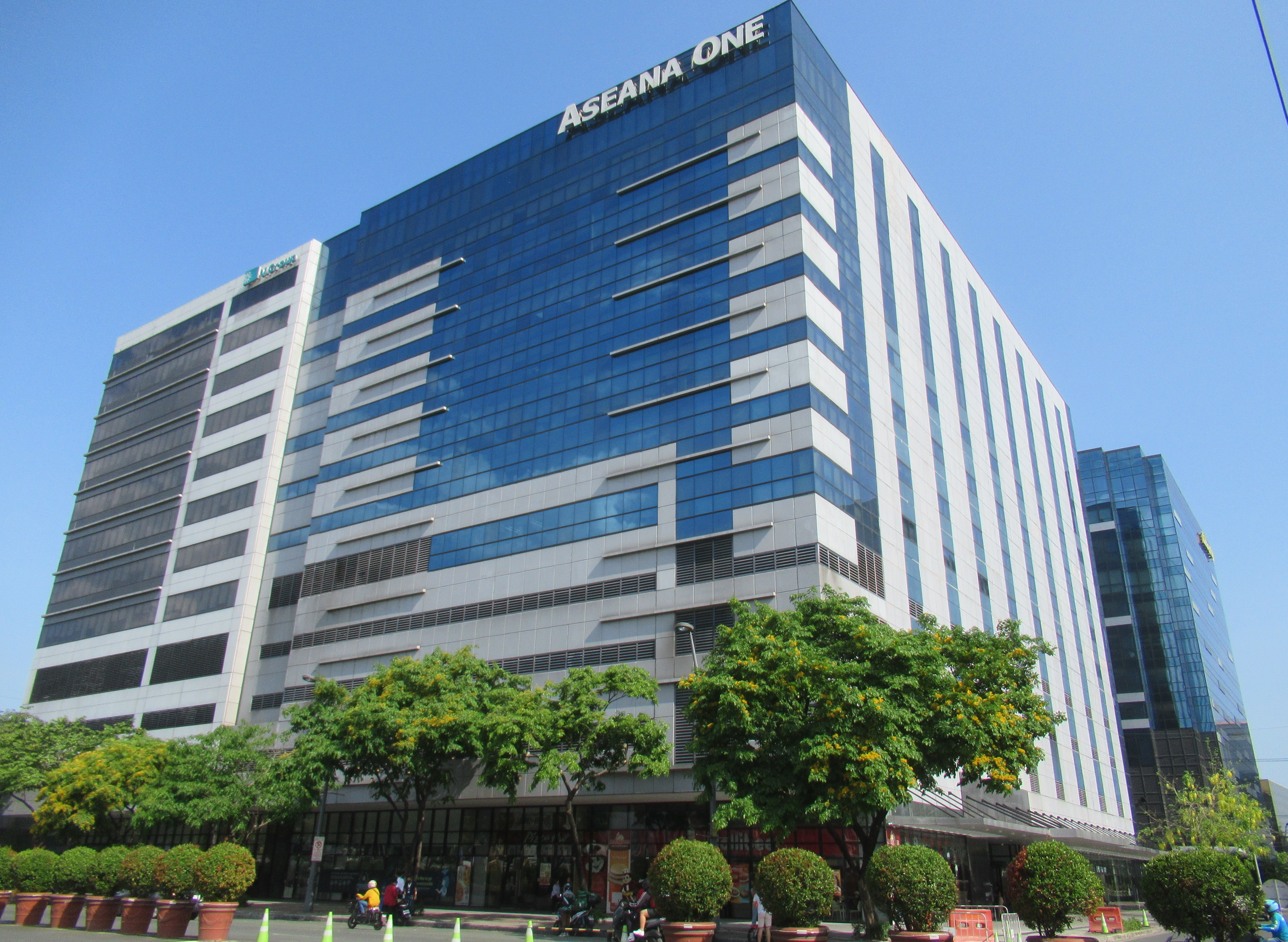
Aseana One

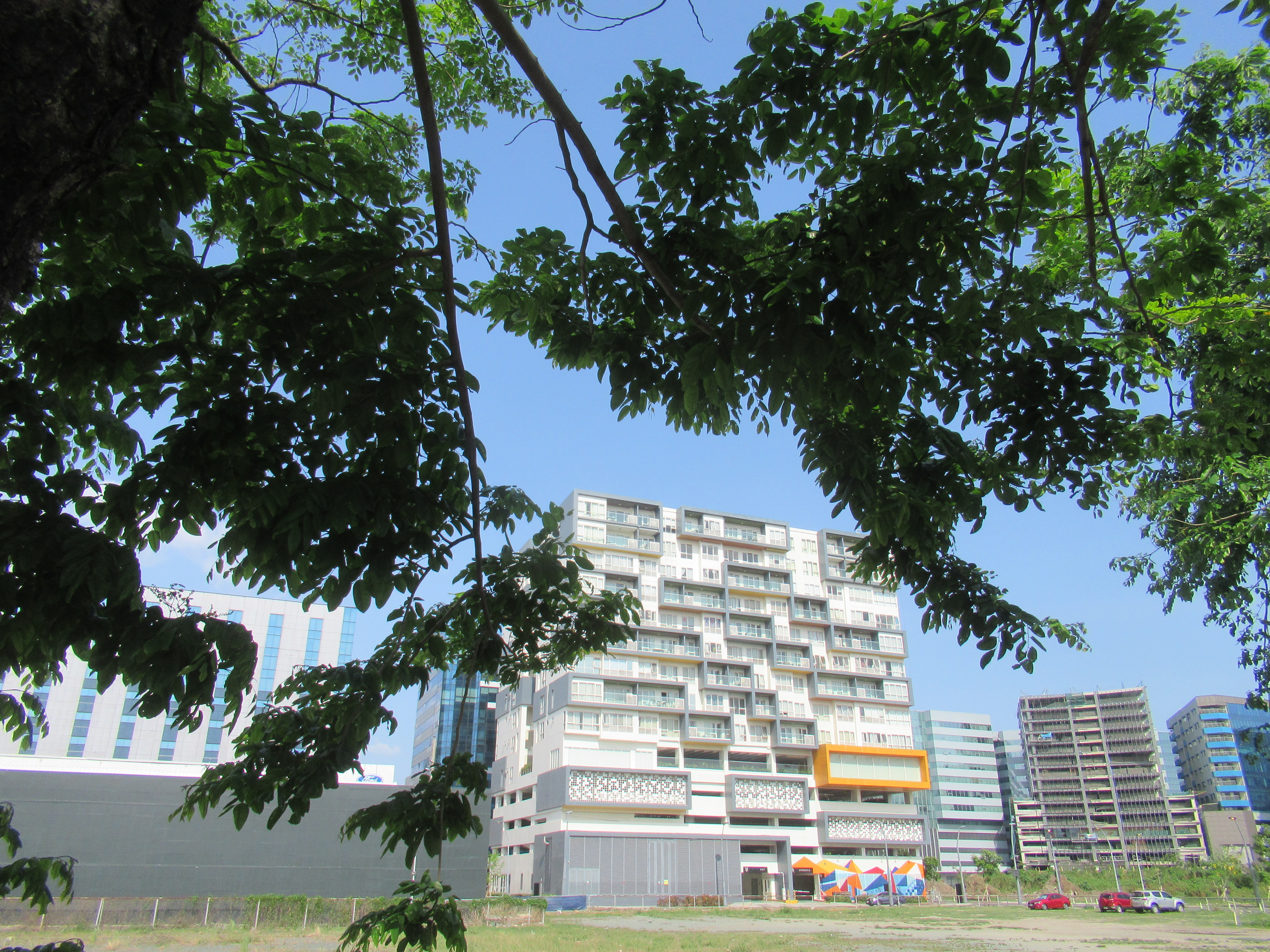
Residences
