= Philippine Trade Training Center =

Agency of the Philippine government

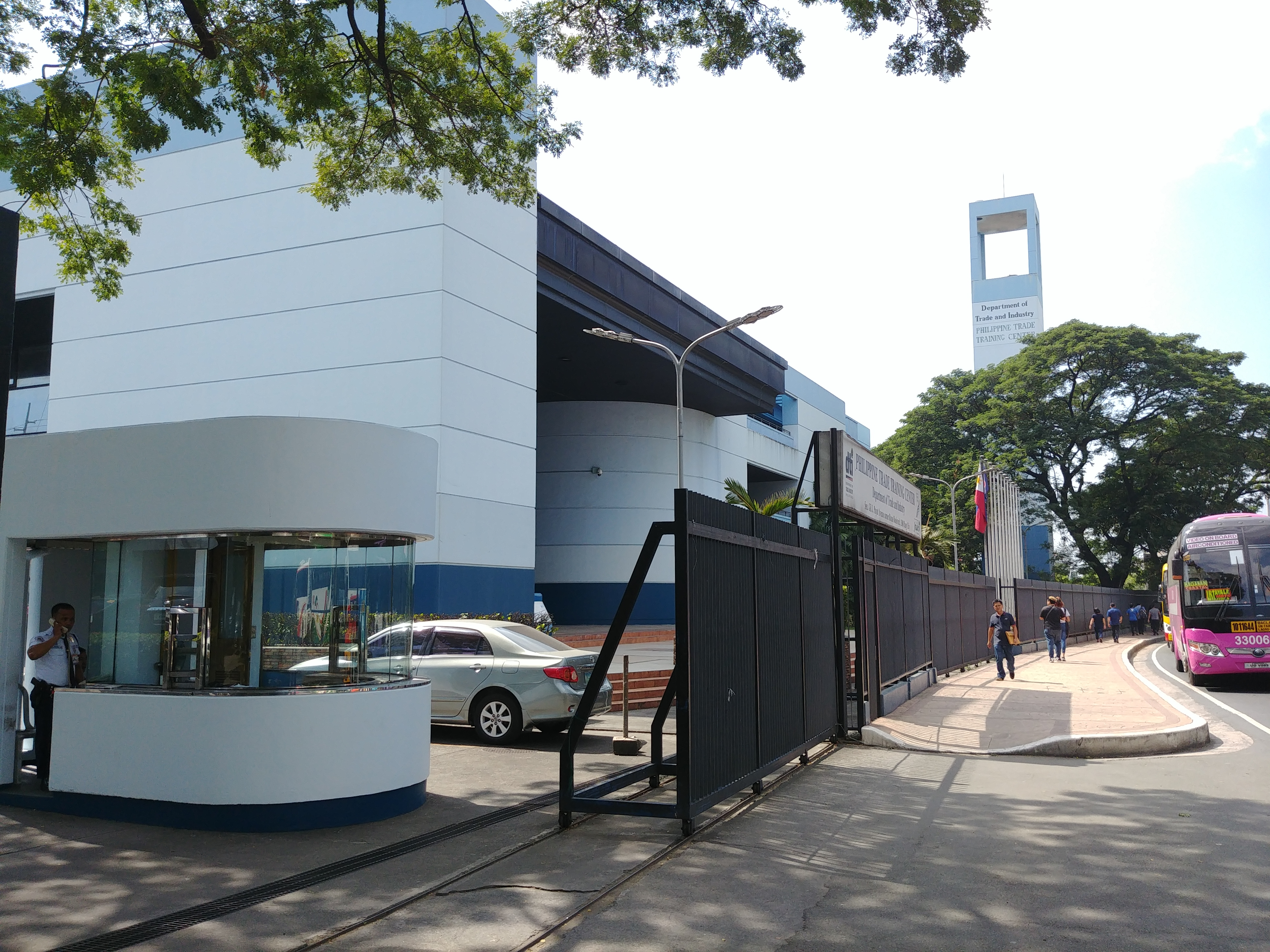
Facade of the Philippine Trade Training Center

The Philippine Trade Training Center (PTTC; Filipino: Sentrong Pasanayan sa Kalakalan ng Pilipinas) is an agency of the Department of Trade and Industry of the Philippines. The agency was founded on February 27, 1987 through Executive Order No. 133. It is supported by the Japan International Cooperation Agency (JICA) through a development assistance grant from the Government of Japan. It assists exporters, potential exporters, manufacturers, and entrepreneurs through provision of training on how to become competitive in the business field. Training programs include advisory services on entrepreneurship development, export management, quality and productivity improvement, e-business, and e-commerce. The center also has exhibition facilities for trade fairs and other events.
