= American Pacific Whaling Company =

20th century whaling company

American Pacific Whaling Company was a 20th-century whaling company. The fleet worked the North Pacific and wintered in Meydenbauer Bay on Lake Washington, now part of Bellevue, Washington. The company was founded in Seattle c. 1911 and possibly renamed to North Pacific Sea Products when subsumed by Consolidated Whaling Company with Canadian ownership in 1918. In 1919, the company moved its headquarters to Bellevue. American Pacific owned a whaling station at Bay City on Grays Harbor that operated between 1911 and 1925, processing up to 300 sperm, humpback, and finback whales a year.

== Fleet ==
The fleet included these whale catcher ships:

- Aberdeen, built 1912
- Moran, built 1911
- Paterson, built 1911
- Westport, built 1912

== Sources ==
- A Short History of Bellevue, Washington (PDF), Eastside Heritage Center, 2011, archived from the original (PDF) on 2016-03-04
- Johnston, Steve (March 1, 1991), "Whale Festival In Bellevue Honors Oldtime Industry -- Whaling Ships Have Given Way To Yachts Today", The Seattle Times
- "Bay City photographs for American Pacific Whaling Co. circa 1920", Jones Photo Historical Collection, Anderson & Middleton, c. 2014, #3601_1, 2,3,4,5, 4716_1, 6016_1, 3602_1, 3602_1, 3603_1, 3604_1, 3605_1
- Vinnedge, Dale (2014), "Washington whaling", Pacific Northwest's Whaling Coast, Arcadia, pp. 59–88, ISBN 9781439648506
- Webb, Robert Lloyd (2011), On the Northwest: Commercial Whaling in the Pacific Northwest, 1790-1967, University of British Columbia Press, ISBN 9780774843157
- American Pacific Whaling Company photograph collection, 1915-1959, Online Archive of California, 2014, SAFR-02283
