= City of Dreams Manila =

Casino in Manila, Philippines

Coordinates: 14°31′25″N 120°59′31″E

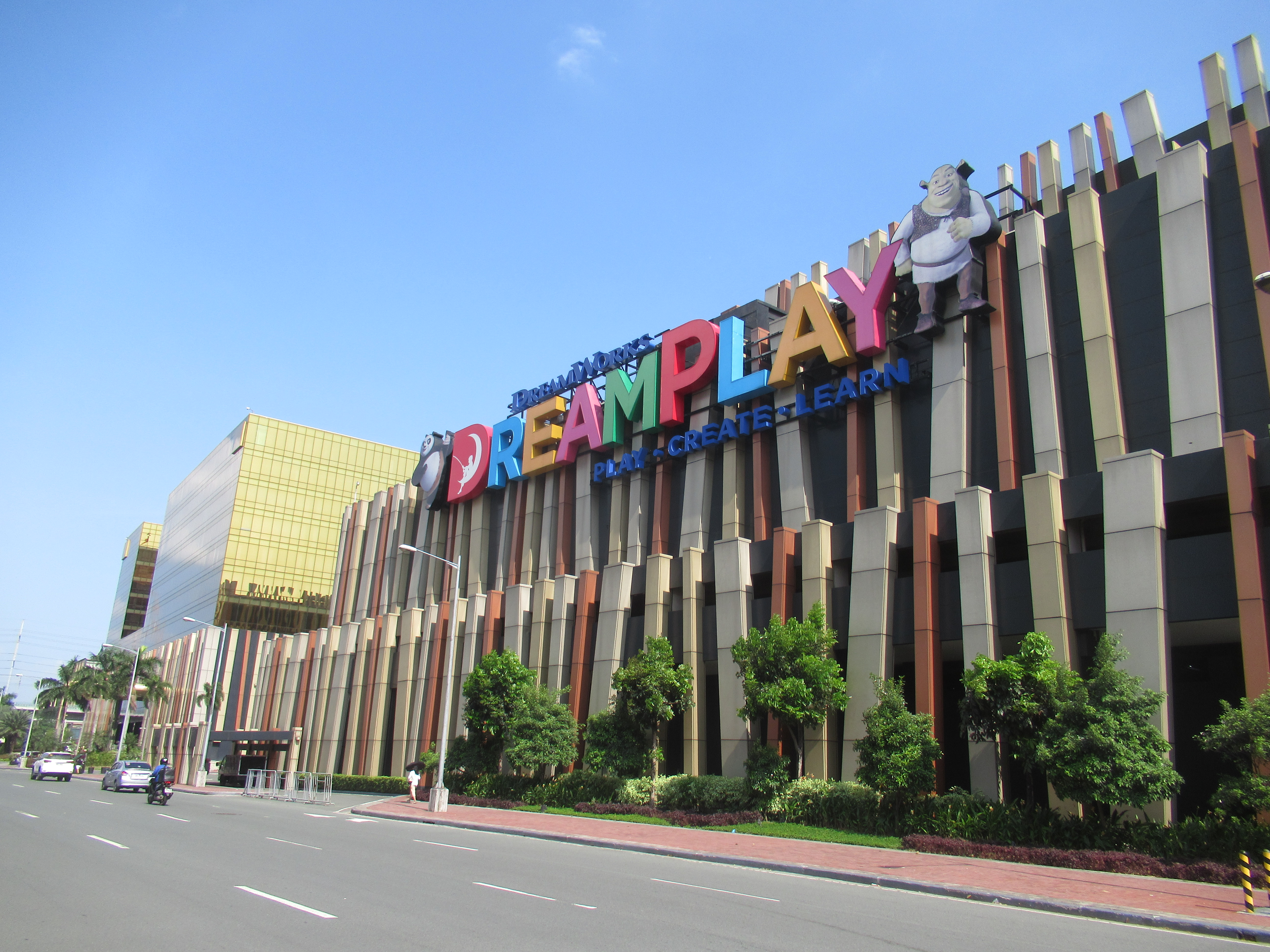
- City of Dreams Manila as seen from Macapagal Boulevard
- Interactive map of City of Dreams Manila
- Location: Entertainment City, Parañaque, Metro Manila, Philippines; Asean Avenue corner Roxas Boulevard
- Opened: Soft opening: December 14, 2014; 11 years ago Grand opening: February 2, 2015; 11 years ago
- No. of rooms: 938; Hyatt Regency Hotel: 363; Nobu Hotel: 321; Nüwa Hotel: 254
- Gaming space: 18,000 square feet (1,700 m^{2})
- Signature attractions: Casino; DreamWorks DreamPlay
- Notable restaurants: Season88; Noodl8; The Cafe; The Lounge; Nobu Restaurant; Nobu Lounge; Crystal Dragon; Cafe Society; Red Ginger; Hidemasa; Jing Ting; Modern Table 082; Wolfgang's Steakhouse; Rossi Pizza; Haliya; Breezes; Wave; J. Park Garden; Mango Tree; TungLok Signatures; Chez Gingy; Centerplay; Gangnam Food Cafe; Cafe Mary Grace; Starbucks
- Casino type: Land-Based; American-styled casino
- Owner: Melco Resorts and Entertainment; Belle Corporation
- Website: cityofdreamsmanila.com

City of Dreams Manila is a 6.2-hectare (15-acre) luxury integrated resort and casino complex located on the Entertainment City gaming strip at Asean Avenue and Roxas Boulevard in Parañaque, Metro Manila, Philippines.

== Overview ==
City of Dreams Manila is owned by Melco Resorts and Entertainment (Philippines) Corporation, a Philippine subsidiary of Melco Resorts & Entertainment Limited (NASDAQ: "MLCO"), the parent company of Melco Resorts Leisure (PHP) Corporation that together with SM Investments Corporation, Belle Corporation and Premium Leisure Amusement, Inc. developed the integrated resort. Melco Resorts Leisure (PHP) Corporation manages and operates City of Dreams Manila. The US$1.3 billion resort complex had its soft opening on December 14, 2014, and its grand opening on February 2, 2015, with live performances from local and international acts such as Gary Valenciano, Zsa Zsa Padilla, Ne-Yo and Kelly Rowland dubbed as the "Concert of Dreams" to mark its grand launch. City of Dreams Manila is a sister resort to City of Dreams in Macau. It is the second of four-billion-dollar casinos to rise in Manila's gaming strip after Solaire Resort & Casino which opened in March 2013.

The resort consists of six hotel towers with 938 rooms, which includes Nobu Hotel, Nüwa Hotel (formerly Crown Towers Hotel) and Hyatt Regency Hotel (rebranded from Hyatt Hotel). It has 289 gaming tables, 1,620 slot machines and 176 electronic table games. A feature of the casino resort is the dome-like structure called Fortune Egg. City of Dreams features a 60,000–80,000 m^{2} (650,000–860,000 sq ft) shopping strip called The Shops at The Boulevard. A theme park is also located within the property called DreamWorks DreamPlay built in collaboration with DreamWorks Animation.

== See also ==
- List of integrated resorts
