= Bay City, Metro Manila =

Central business district in Metro Manila, Philippines

Bay City
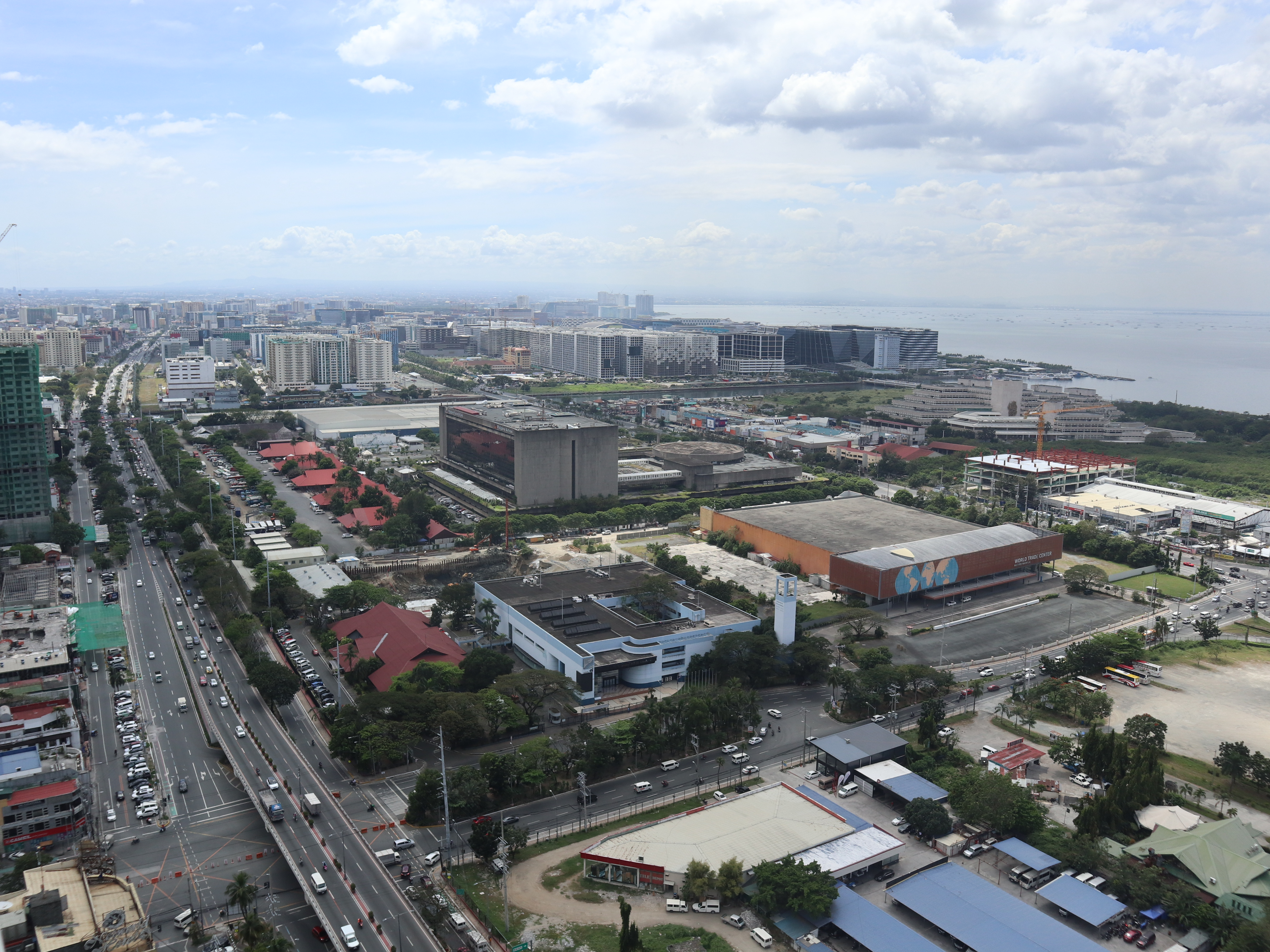
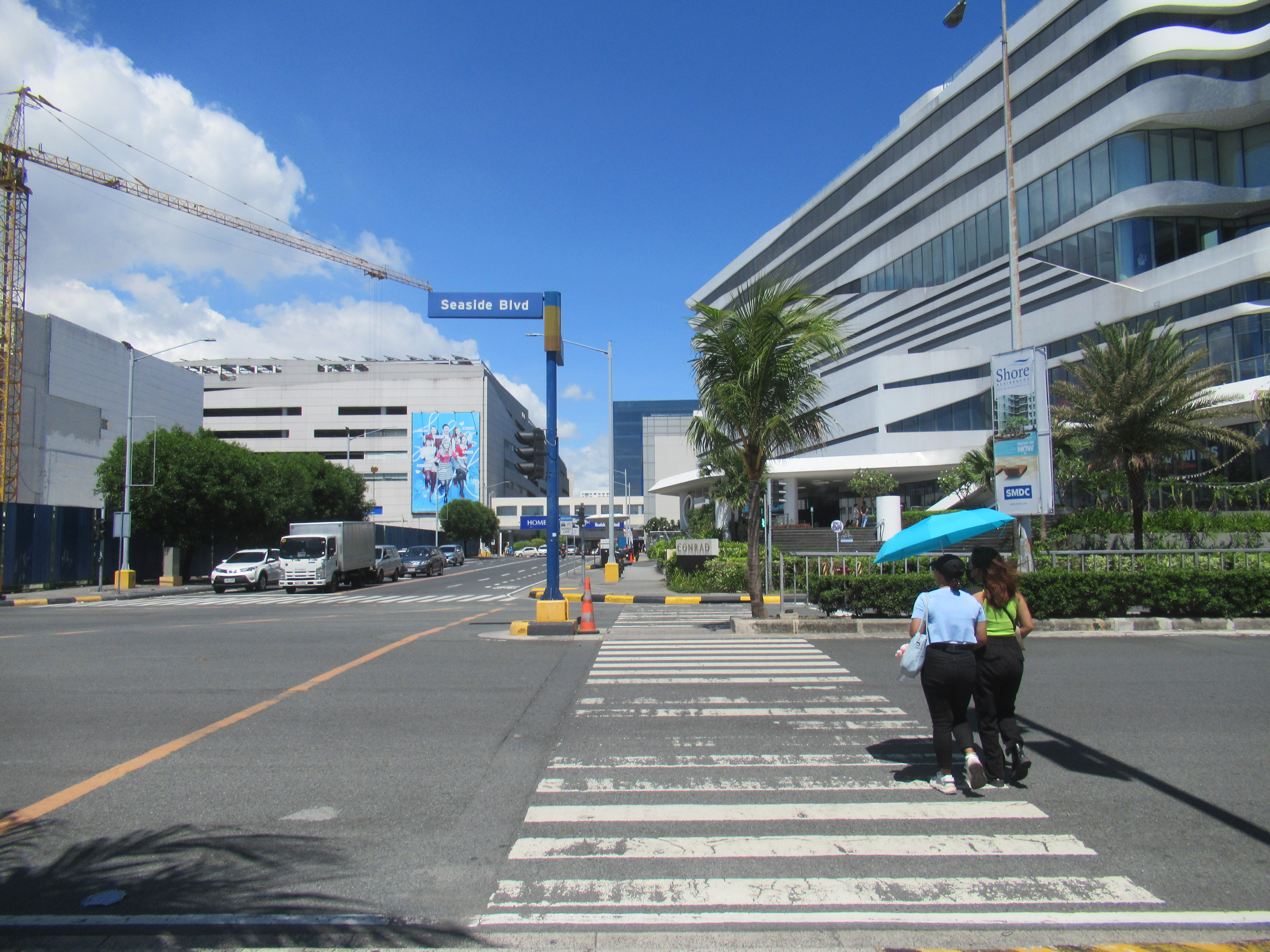
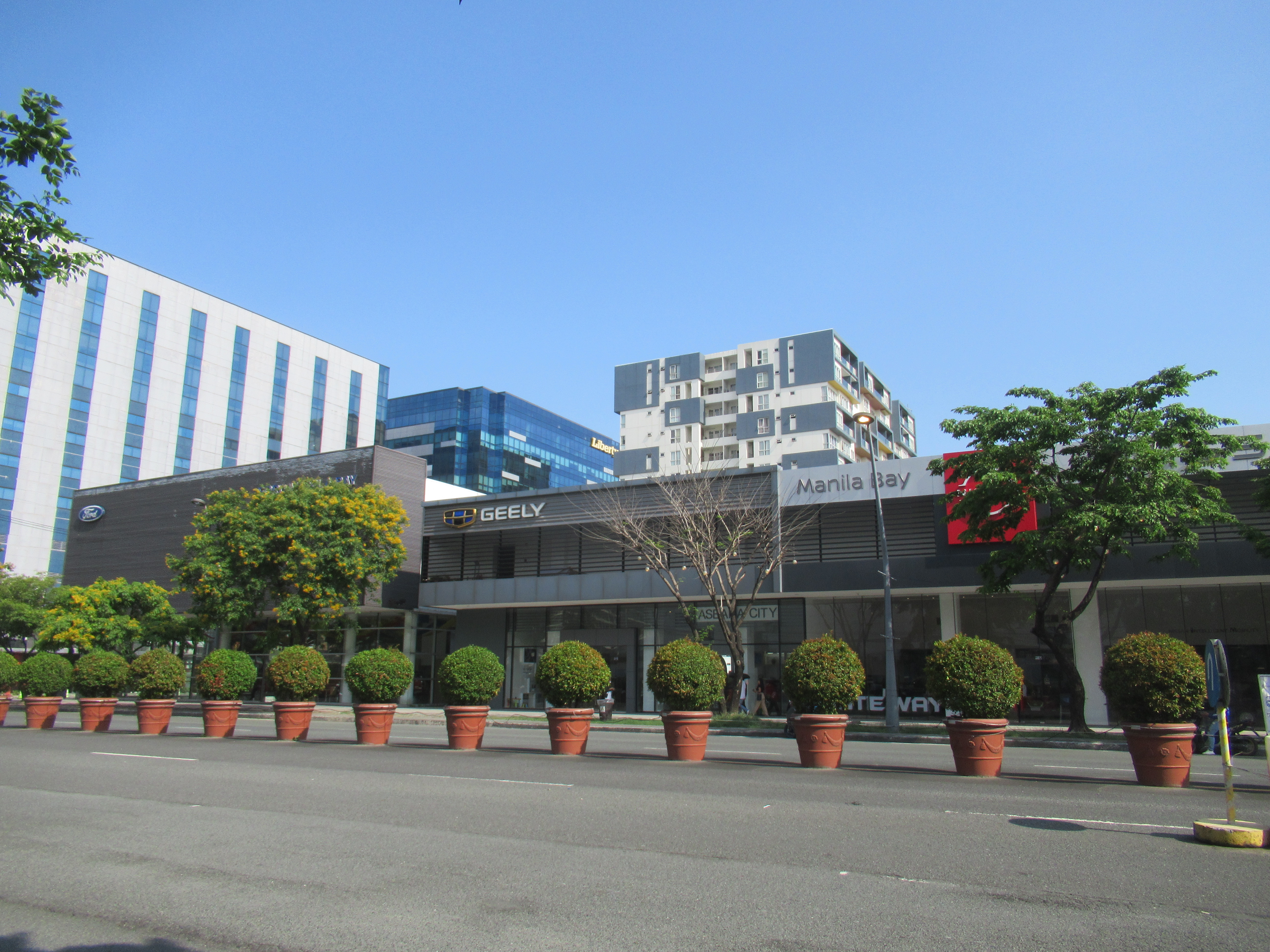
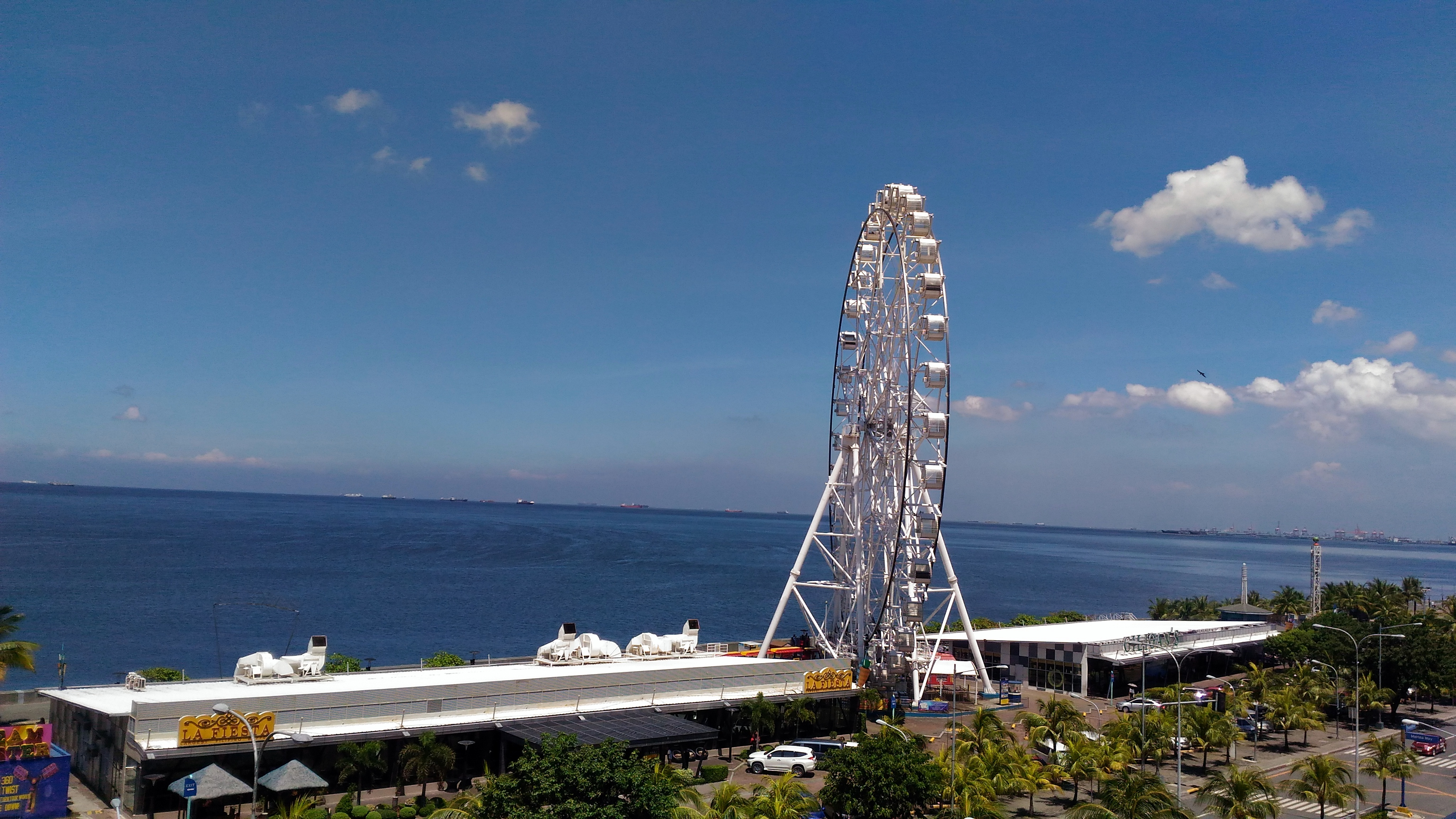
- Clockwise from top: Aerial view of Bay City in Pasay area, Aseana City, MOA Eye, Seaside Boulevard

Project
- Opening date: 1977
- Developer: Philippine Reclamation Authority
- Website: Philippine Reclamation Authority

Physical features
- Major buildings: SM Mall of Asia, Ayala Malls Manila Bay, DoubleDragon Plaza
- Divisions: Central Business Park, Aseana City, Entertainment City, Cultural Center of the Philippines Complex, Financial Center Area, Asiaworld and Cyber Bay City
- Streets: Epifanio de los Santos Avenue; Jose W. Diokno Boulevard; Macapagal Boulevard

Location
- Location in Metro Manila Location in Luzon Location in the Philippines
- Coordinates: 14°31′25″N 120°59′02″E
- Country: Philippines
- Region: Metro Manila
- Cities: Pasay; Parañaque

Bay City, also known as the Manila Bay Freeport Zone and Manila Bay Area, is the name for the reclamation area on Manila Bay located west of Roxas Boulevard and the Manila–Cavite Expressway in Metro Manila, Philippines. The area is split between the cities of Manila and Pasay on the north side and Parañaque on the south.

== Description ==
Bay City is administratively divided between the villages of Barangay 719 of Malate, Manila and Barangay 76 of Pasay in the northern Cultural Center of the Philippines Complex-Financial Center Area (CCP-FCA) section, and the villages of Barangay 76 of Pasay and Baclaran, Tambo and Don Galo of Parañaque in the southern Central Business Park and Asiaworld section.

The area is most well known for being home of the SM Mall of Asia, the largest mall in the Philippines, Aseana City, an integrated mixed use central business district serving the Bay Area, 8 km^{2} (3.1 sq mi) Entertainment City with casinos, amusement parks, theaters, office building, hotels, residential buildings and resorts. It lies on the western side of Roxas Boulevard in Parañaque and south of the SM Mall of Asia Complex. Investments to the project could reach up to $15 billion, which was scaled down from the more recent $20 billion budget announcement that had been previously announced in 2007. The first integrated resort complex to open in Entertainment City was Bloomberry-owned Solaire Resort & Casino on March 16, 2013. It was followed by City of Dreams Manila (soft opening December 14, 2014), Okada Manila (opened December 2016). Although the PEA advertised Bay City as the "new business capital" of Manila, development is proceeding slowly.

The main roads in this area are EDSA with its Bay City portion spans from Roxas Boulevard to SM Mall of Asia, and Macapagal Boulevard and Jose W. Diokno Boulevard which runs north–south throughout the area. It is directly accessible from Ninoy Aquino International Airport via the NAIA Expressway, and from the Makati CBD, Ortigas Center and Bonifacio Global City via EDSA.

== History ==
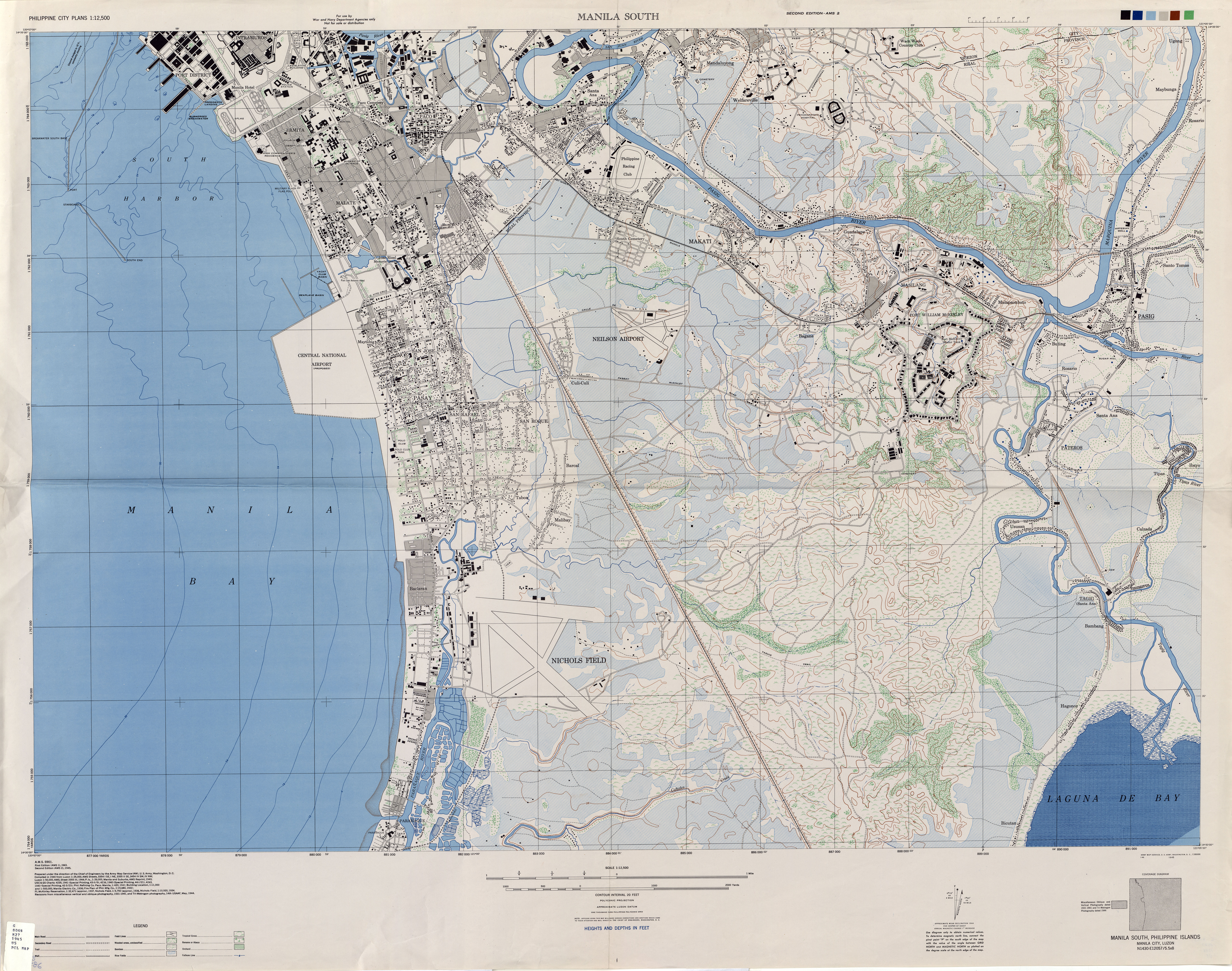
Map of southern Manila and adjacent municipalities in 1945, depicting the proposed reclaimed land in Manila Bay intended for a central national airport.

Around 1945, there was a plan to build a central national airport on reclaimed land in Manila Bay, particularly in northeastern Pasay. However, this was not realized.

In 1974, a plan to reclaim land in Manila Bay was revived, this time with an area of 3,000 hectares (7,400 acres). The project, formerly known as Boulevard 2000, was initiated by First Lady Imelda Marcos in 1977, with the creation of the Public Estates Authority (now Philippine Reclamation Authority) to manage the project. By the end of Marcos rule in early 1986, 660 hectares (1,600 acres) had been reclaimed, including the 77-hectare (190-acre) Cultural Center of the Philippines Complex. In 2017, the project of the Philippine Reclamation Authority renamed to Manila Bay Freeport Zone, which was envisioned by President Rodrigo Duterte.

== Developments ==
=== Cultural Center of the Philippines Complex ===
The 77-hectare (190-acre) Cultural Center of the Philippines Complex covers the northernmost portion of Bay City and is under the jurisdiction of two cities, Manila (where it is part of the district of Malate) and Pasay. It is bounded by Manila Bay to the north and west, the Philippine Navy headquarters to the northeast, Roxas Boulevard to the east, and Jose W. Diokno Boulevard to the south. It is divided into two zones: the Art Zone, and the Commercial and Entertainment Zone. It features several brutalist structures designed in the 1960s and 1970s by Leandro Locsin, such as the Tanghalang Pambansa, the Philippine International Convention Center, and the Sofitel Philippine Plaza Manila. Other locators in the complex include the MBC Media Group, Coconut Palace, the Manila Film Center and Star City amusement park.

=== Financial Center Area ===
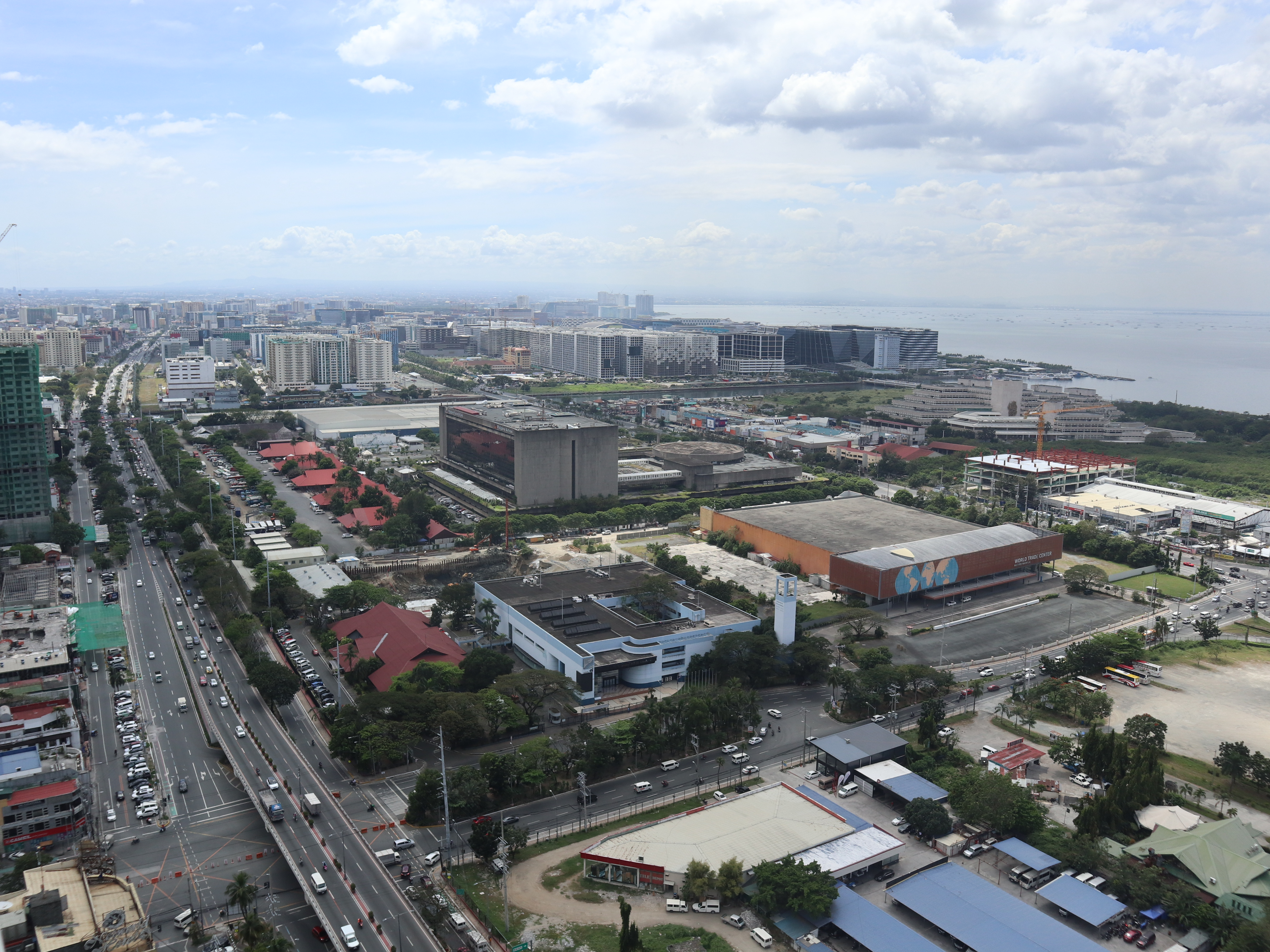
Financial Center Area

The 77-hectare (190-acre) Financial Center Area covers the southern half of the CCP-FCA island. It is the first land to be reclaimed under the Boulevard 2000 project of the Philippine Reclamation Authority. It is bounded by Gil Puyat Avenue Extension to the north, and the Libertad Channel to the south. The area includes the Philippine National Bank complex which used to house the Philippine Airlines headquarters, some Department of Trade and Industry (DTI)-linked entities such as the World Trade Center Metro Manila, Philippine Trade Training Center, and the Government Service Insurance System complex which currently hosts the Senate of the Philippines.

=== Central Business Park ===
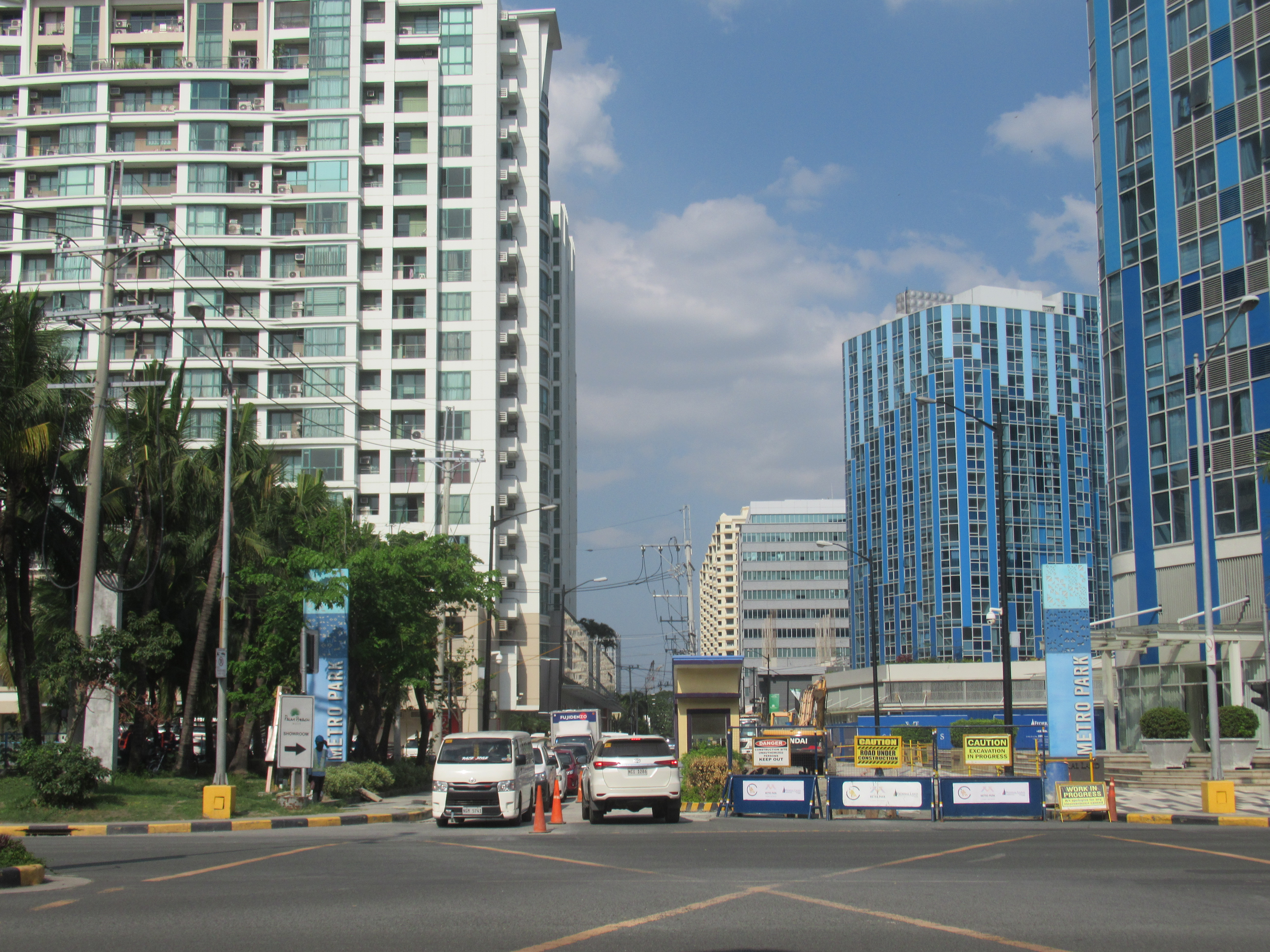
Metropolitan Park

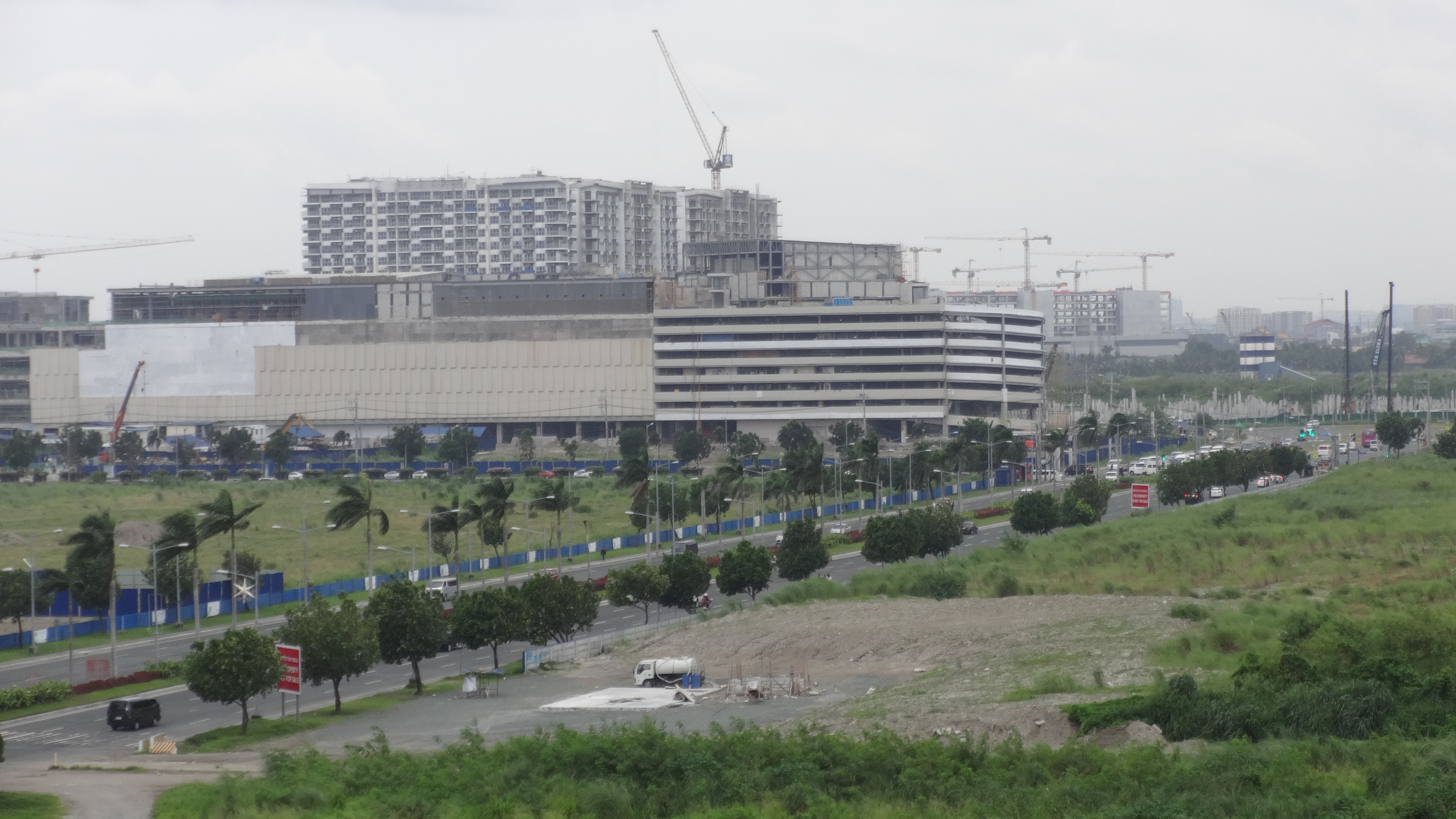
Aseana City

The Central Business Park (CBP) island covers the central portion of Bay City and is divided into three sections. The northernmost section, CBP I-A, has an area of 200 hectares (490 acres) and is home to the SM Central Business Park, the Metropolitan Park of the Metropolitan Bank and Trust Company, and the Philippine Reclamation Authority. The SM Central Business Park contains the corporate headquarters of SM Prime Holdings, as well as the 67 hectares (170 acres) SM Mall of Asia shopping mall complex which houses the Galeón museum and the SM by the Bay promenade. It also hosts the Mall of Asia Arena, SMX Convention Center Manila, Conrad Manila, the Archdiocesan Shrine of Jesus, the Way, the Truth, and the Life and a ferry terminal of the Metrostar Ferry. In the 36 hectares (89 acres) Metropolitan Park of Metrobank, the main locators are the BlueWave and Blue Bay Walk strip malls, Met Live shopping mall, Manila Tytana College and Le Pavilion. Other locations included in the said area are the DD Meridian Park of DoubleDragon Properties, a 4.75-hectare (11.7-acre) mixed-use development which houses the DoubleDragon Plaza and Hotel 101, Walter Mart's W Mall and Citadines Bay City Manila, a 4-star hotel managed by The Ascott Limited.

Immediately to the south are the CBP I-B and I-C lots occupied by the Aseana City (Aseana Business Park) and PAGCOR's 40-hectare (99-acre) Entertainment City. Aseana City is the location of the 4-hectare (9.9-acre) Neo-Chinatown, Aseana 1-3 Office Buildings, Singapore School Manila, The King's School, Manila, Ayala Malls Manila Bay, Department of Foreign Affairs – Office of the Consular Affairs, S&R Membership Shopping Aseana, Saint John Paul II Chapel, and Parqal Mall. On the other hand, Entertainment City is home to four multi-billion dollar casinos and integrated resorts— Solaire Resort & Casino, City of Dreams Manila, Okada Manila, and the upcoming Westside City—as well as SMDC Festival Grounds and the under-construction satellite office of the Parañaque City Hall.

SM Mall of Asia photographed in 2009.

=== Asiaworld and Cyber Bay City ===
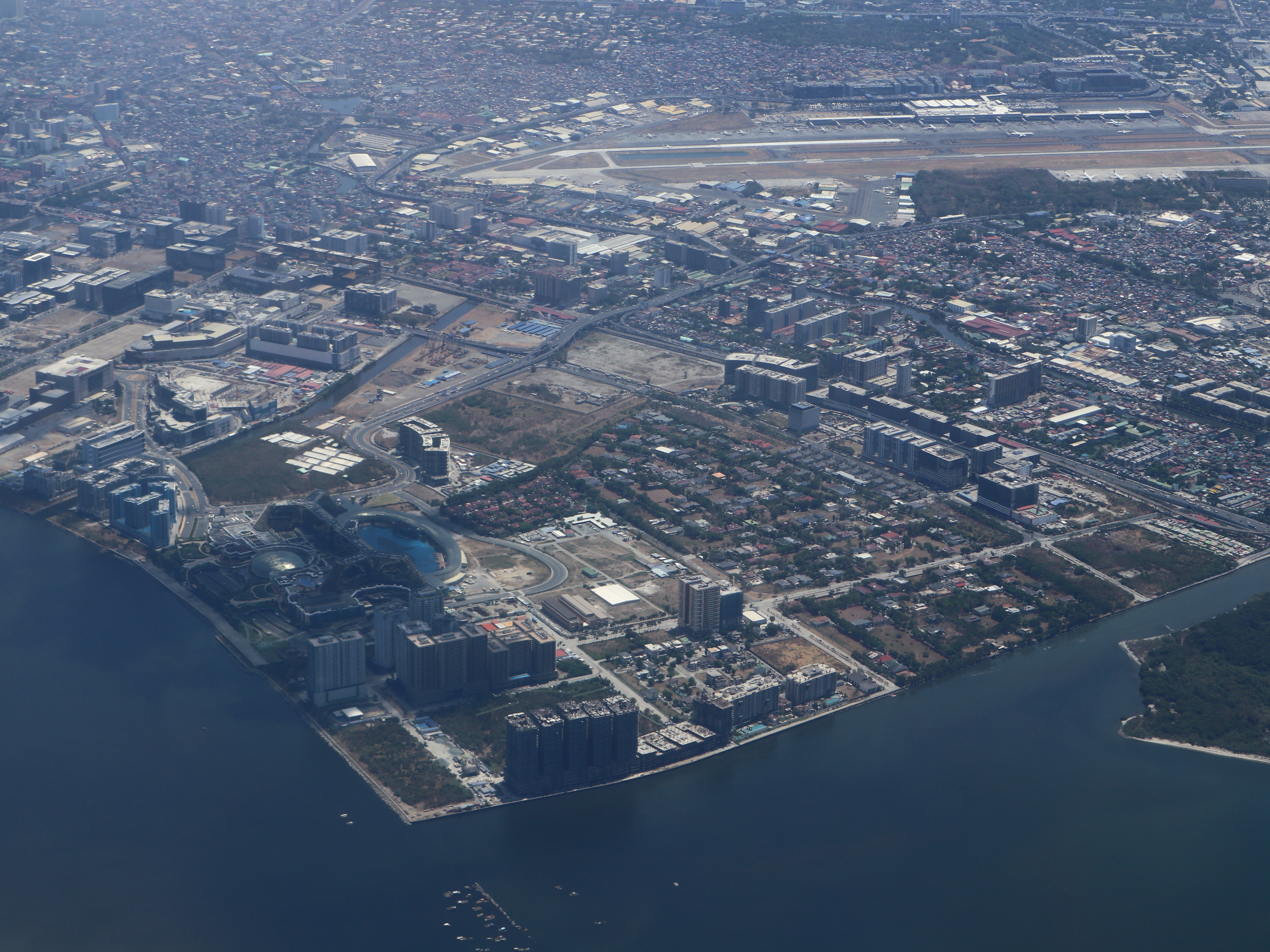
Aseana City, Entertainment City, and Asiaworld

In the southern portion of Bay City in Parañaque lies Asiaworld, also known as Marina district, a 173-hectare (430-acre) property owned by the family of Tan Yu which contains mostly residential developments such as the gated community of Marina Baytown Village and Burgundy residential towers. It is also the location of the former Uniwide Sales Coastal Mall, which once housed the Southwest Integrated Bus Terminal (SWITS). The Parañaque Integrated Terminal Exchange (PITx), the successor to SWITS, is situated near the north end of the Manila–Cavite Expressway. The area hosted Michael Jackson's HIStory World Tour concert on December 8 and 10, 1996, in front of 110,000 people.

South of Asiaworld is Freedom Island and two smaller islands collectively known as Three Islands (formerly Amari). The area is planned to contain the Cyber Bay City with the Golf Residential Community District serving as its anchor development. It would also provide other sports facilities and would contain open parks, schools, retail and residential components. The project was stalled due to the PEA-Amari scandal during the term of President Fidel V. Ramos. At present, the islands are protected as a Ramsar site known as the Las Piñas–Parañaque Critical Habitat and Ecotourism Area.

== See also ==
- Land reclamation in Metro Manila
