= Taguig =

Highly urbanized city in Metro Manila, Philippines

Taguig Tagig
- Highly urbanized city
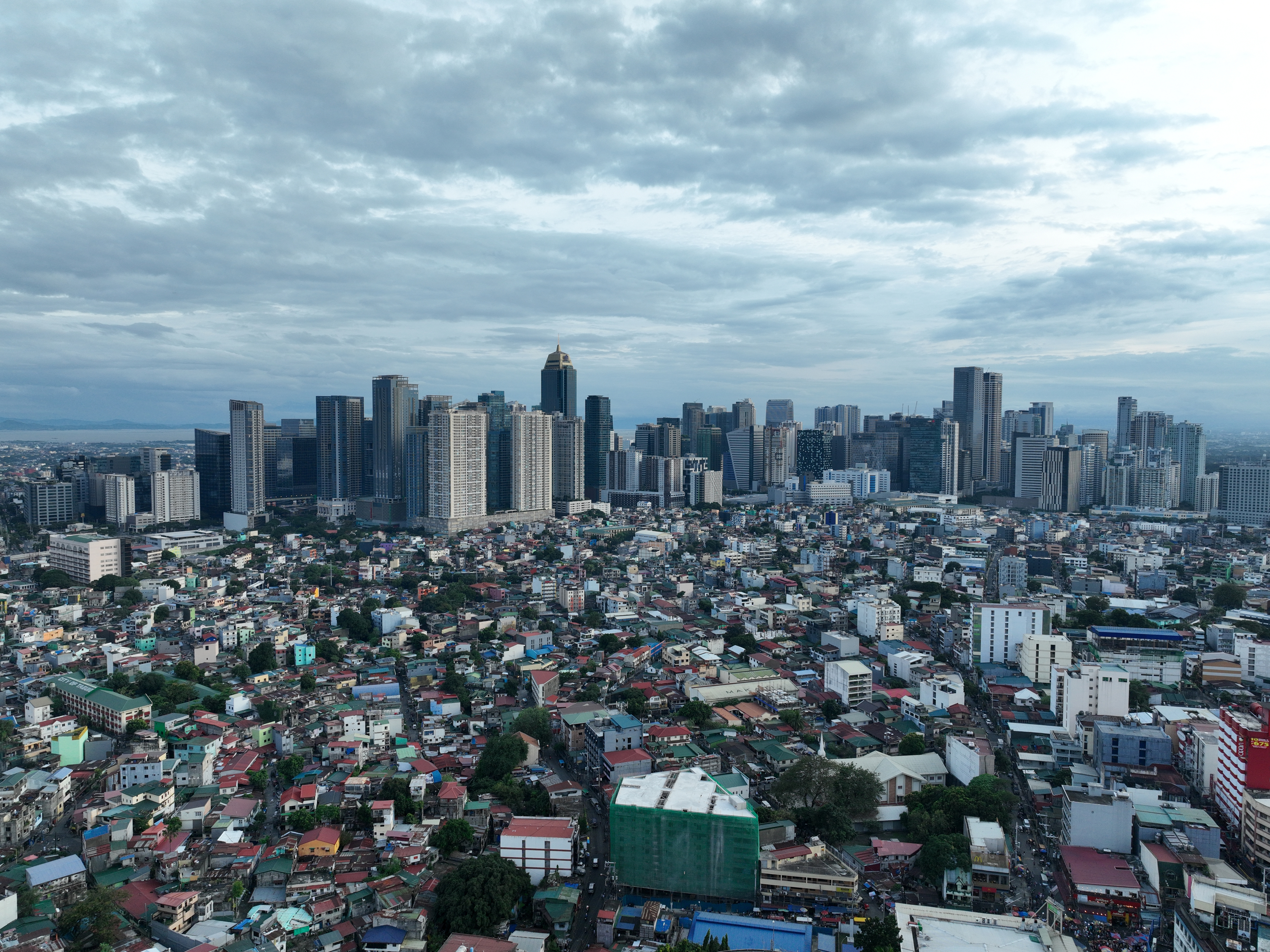
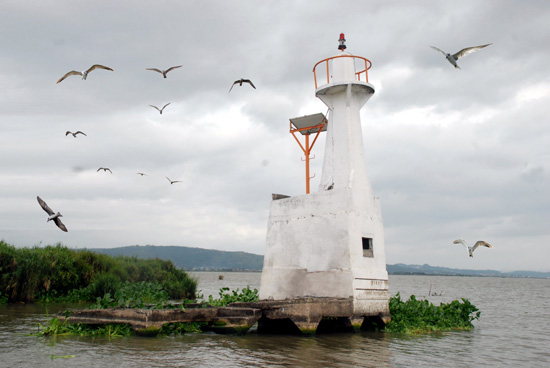
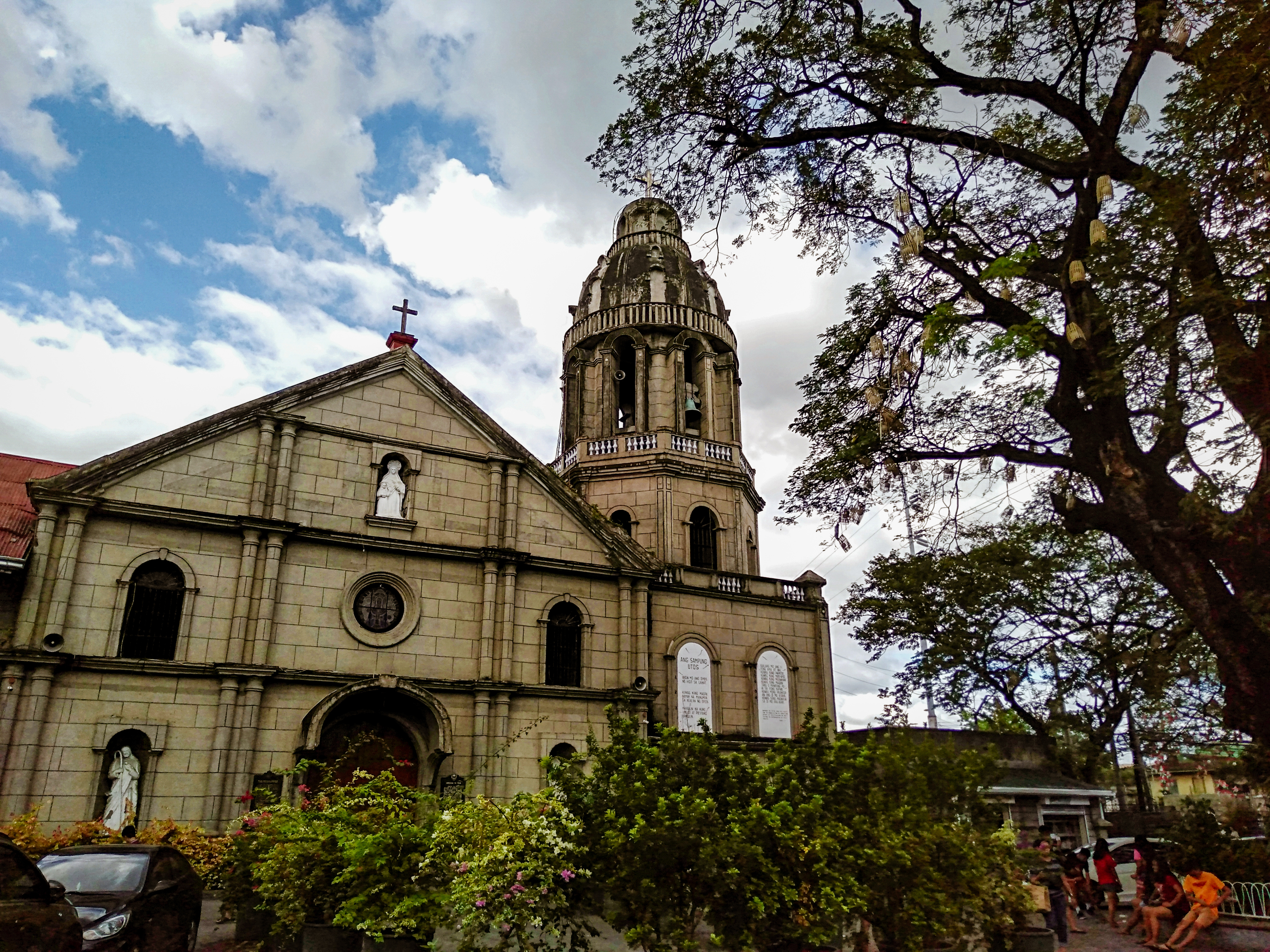
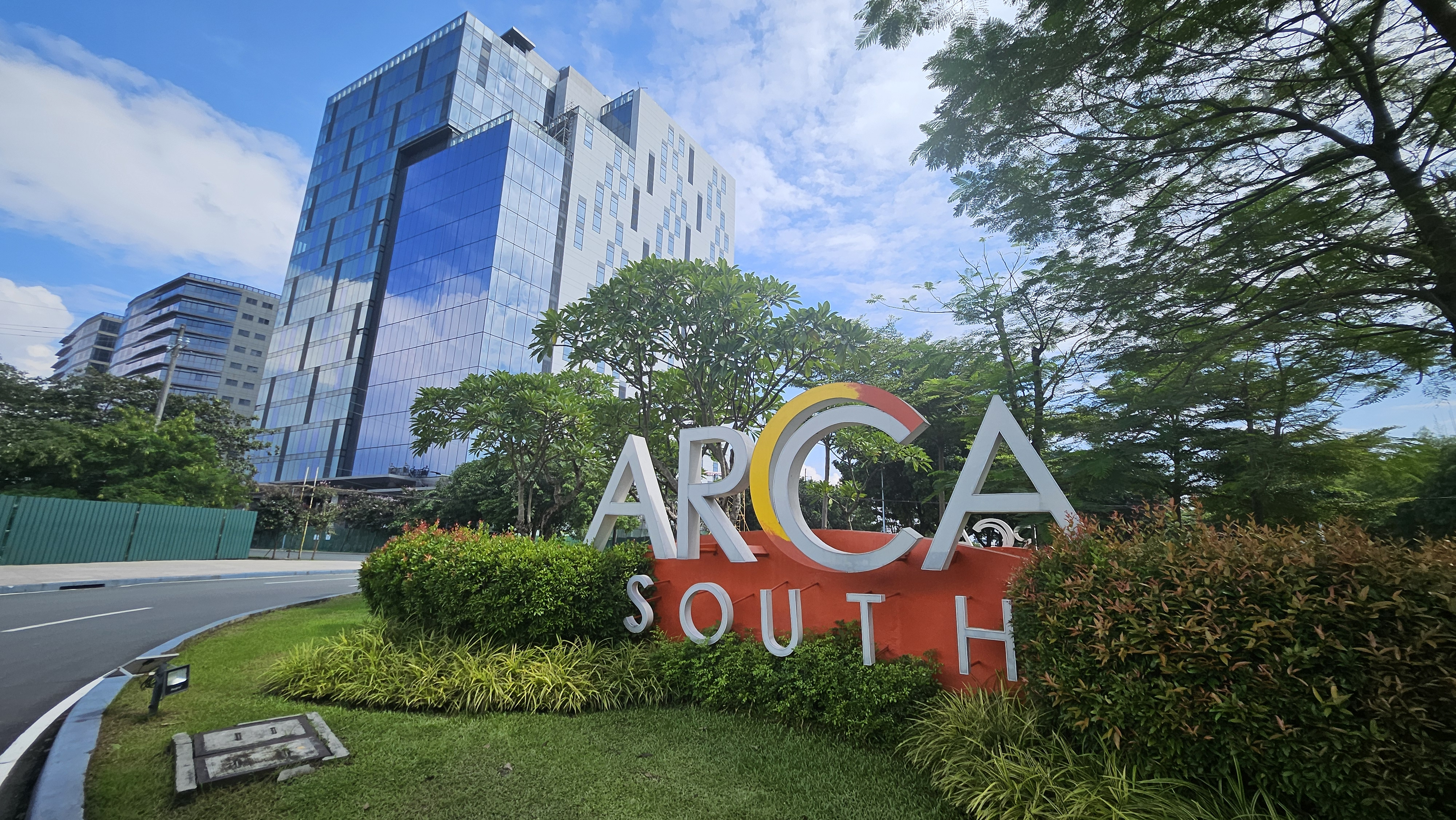
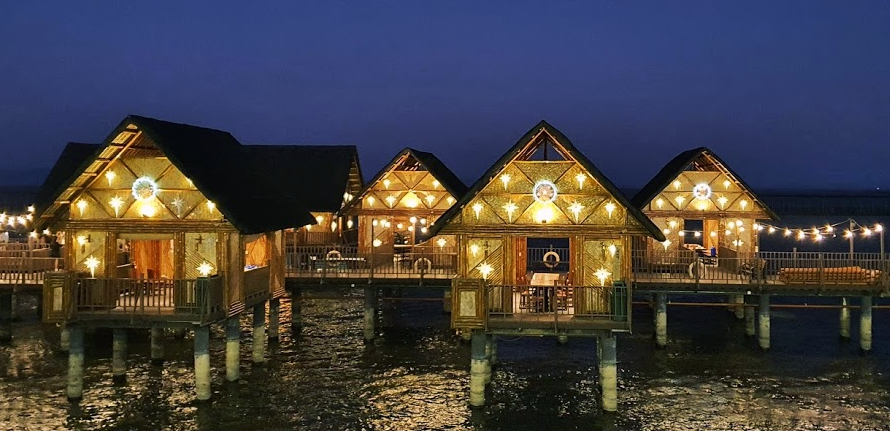
- Bonifacio Global City and the Enlisted Men's Barrios Napindan Parola Minor Basilica of Saint Anne New City Hall Building Arca South Mercado del Lago Lakeshore

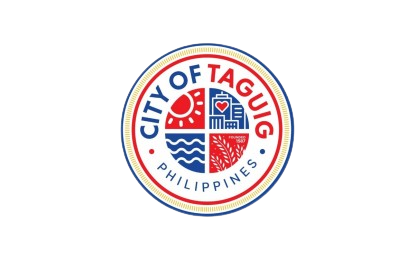
- Flag Seal Wordmark
- Etymology: Taga-giik (rice thresher)
- Nickname: Probinsyudad
- Motto: "I Love Taguig" "Think Big. Dream Big. Love Taguig."
- Anthem: Martsa ng Taguig ("Taguig March")
- Map of Metro Manila with Taguig highlighted
- Interactive map of Taguig
- Location within the Philippines
- Coordinates: 14°31′N 121°03′E
- Country: Philippines
- Region: Metro Manila
- District: 1st district (shared with Pateros) and 2nd district
- Established: April 25, 1587
- Municipal corporation: January 31, 1901
- City charter: December 8, 2004
- Recent territorial change: October 26, 2023
- Barangays: 38 (see Barangays)

Government
  - Type: Sangguniang Panlungsod
  - Mayor: Ma. Laarni "Lani" L. Cayetano (Nacionalista)
  - Vice Mayor: Arvin Ian V. Alit (Nacionalista)
  - Representatives: Ricardo S. Cruz Jr. (1st District with Pateros) (Nacionalista); Jorge Daniel S. Bocobo (2nd District) (Nacionalista)
  - City Council: Members: 1st District; Darwin B. Icay; Allan Paul C. Cruz; Jaime R. Labampa; Arnold J. Cruz; Fanella Joy B. Panga-Cruz; Rodil C. Marcelino; Gamaliel N. San Pedro; Kim M. Abbang; Carlito M. Ogalinola; Raul T. Aquino; Ferdinand B. Santos; Lamberto M. Mañosca; 2nd District; Marjorie Bermas-Villasis; Nicky C. Supan; Alvinleen P. Dizon; Danilo B. Castro; Jomil Bryan C. Serna; Alexander S. Penolio; Evelyn Delfina E. Villamor; Hannah Genele P. Pau-Tin; Eduardo B. Prado; Edgar Victor S. Baptista; Grazielle Iony N. De Lara-Bes; Marisse Balina-Eron; Liga ng mga Barangay President; Marilyn F. Marcelino; SK Federation President; Joanna Mae M. Pagkalinawan
  - Electorate: 680,554 voters (2025)

Area
  - Highly urbanized city: 47.28 km^{2} (18.25 sq mi)
- Elevation: 13 m (43 ft)
- Highest elevation: 179 m (587 ft)
- Lowest elevation: −1 m (−3.3 ft)

Population (2024 census)
  - Highly urbanized city: 1,308,085
  - Rank: 5th
  - Density: 27,670/km^{2} (71,660/sq mi)
  - Urban: 13,484,482
  - Urban density: 21,202/km^{2} (54,910/sq mi)
  - Households: 246,873
- Demonym: Taguigeño / Taguigeña

Economy
  - Income class: 1st city income class
  - Poverty incidence: 3.2% (2023)
  - Revenue: ₱ 22,774 million (2025)
  - Assets: ₱ 54,552 million (2025)
  - Expenditure: ₱ 21,039 million (2025)
  - Liabilities: ₱ 29,087 million (2025)

Utilities
  - Electricity: Manila Electric Company (Meralco)
  - Water: Manila Water
- Time zone: UTC+8 (PST)
- ZIP code: 1630–1649
- PSGC: 137607000
- IDD : area code: +63 (0)02
- Native languages: Filipino
- Currency: Philippine peso (₱)
- Feast date: July 26
- Catholic diocese: Roman Catholic Archdiocese of Manila (Embo barangays); Roman Catholic Diocese of Pasig (rest of Taguig)
- Patron saint: Saint Anne
- Website: taguig.gov.ph

Taguig (Tagalog: [taˈɡiɡ]), officially the City of Taguig (Filipino: Lungsod ng Taguig), is a highly urbanized city in the National Capital Region of the Philippines. According to the 2024 census, it has a population of 1,308,085 people, making it the fifth most populous city in the country. It is a national center for culture, finance, technology, entertainment and media, academics, and the arts and fashion. The city hosts several embassies, making it an important center for the country's international diplomacy. As the home of Fort Bonifacio, which contains the largest financial districts such as Bonifacio Global City, Bonifacio Capital District, and McKinley Hill, major local and multinational corporations have their headquarters in the city, and it has the third largest skyline in the Philippines, with 289 high-rises, 80 of which exceed 100 m (328 ft).

Taguig is located alongside the northwestern shores of Laguna de Bay and is situated in the southeastern portion of Metro Manila. The city covers about 47.28 square kilometers (18.25 sq mi) and it is bordered by Pasig and Pateros to the north, Makati and Mandaluyong to the northwest, Pasay and Parañaque to the west, Taytay, Rizal to the northeast and Muntinlupa to the south.

Taguig was once a hamlet during the Spanish colonial period, Pateros become a visita of Taguig from 1742 until it become a separate municipality in 1815. During the American colonial period, large swaths of the city became a military reservation, and the town was merged with the municipalities of Pateros and Muntinlupa at some point until the 2 municipality becomes independent from it. Redevelopment of the military reservation spearheaded by the Bases Conversion and Development Authority (BCDA) in the 1990s established Taguig as a center of finance and commerce in the Philippines, with the establishment of districts such as Bonifacio Global City (BGC), McKinley Hill, and the Bonifacio Capital District. Taguig became a highly urbanized city with the passage of Republic Act No. 8487 in 2004, which was ratified by a plebiscite.

== Etymology ==
The name of the city was derived from taga-giik, the Tagalog word for rice threshers. In the 1570s, the male citizens of the town which numbered to about 800 were good at threshing rice after harvest. Hence, they were referred to as "mga taga-giik" and the settlement as "pook ng mga taga-giik" (lit. transl. place of the rice threshers). Spanish friar Fray Alonso de Alvarado, together with conquistador Ruy López de Villalobos who crossed the Pasig River to reach the city's present site in 1571, found "taga-giik" difficult to pronounce. "Tagui-ig" was later shortened to its current form "Taguig". It was also spelled "Tagui" or "Tagig," apparently influenced by Spanish orthographic conventions.

== History ==
=== Early history ===
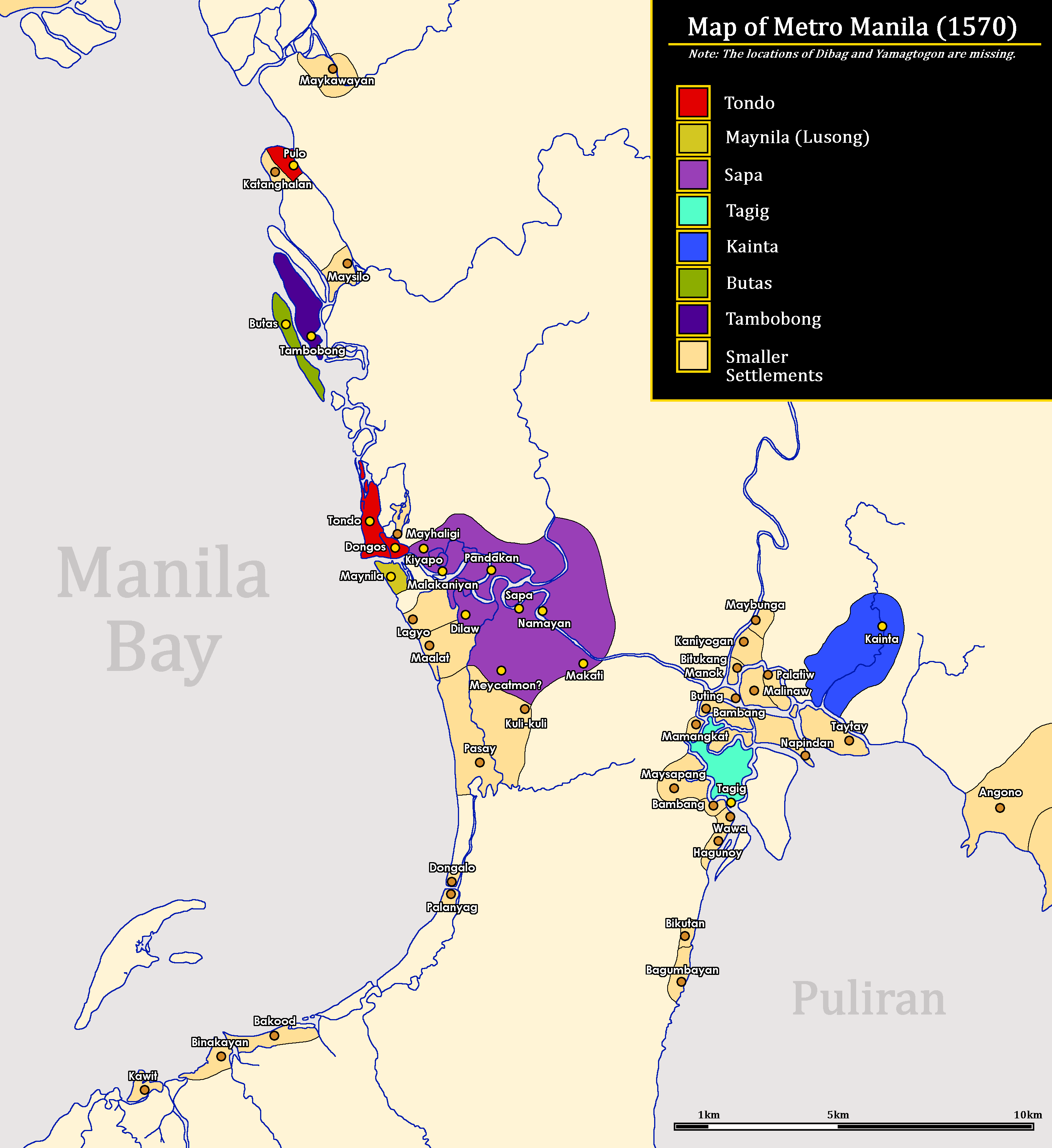
A map of ancient Manila in 1570, with Taguig (colored teal) on the southeast.

Before the Spaniards came, Taguig was an established Tagalog settlement with Moro and Chinese present in the area as revealed by the recent archaeological diggings of various artifacts like cups, plates and other utensils, which bear Chinese characters. This was believed to have originated from China's Ming dynasty. Duck culture was practiced by the Tagalogs, particularly in the areas where the city and the Municipality of Pateros stands today.

=== Spanish rule (1571–1898) ===
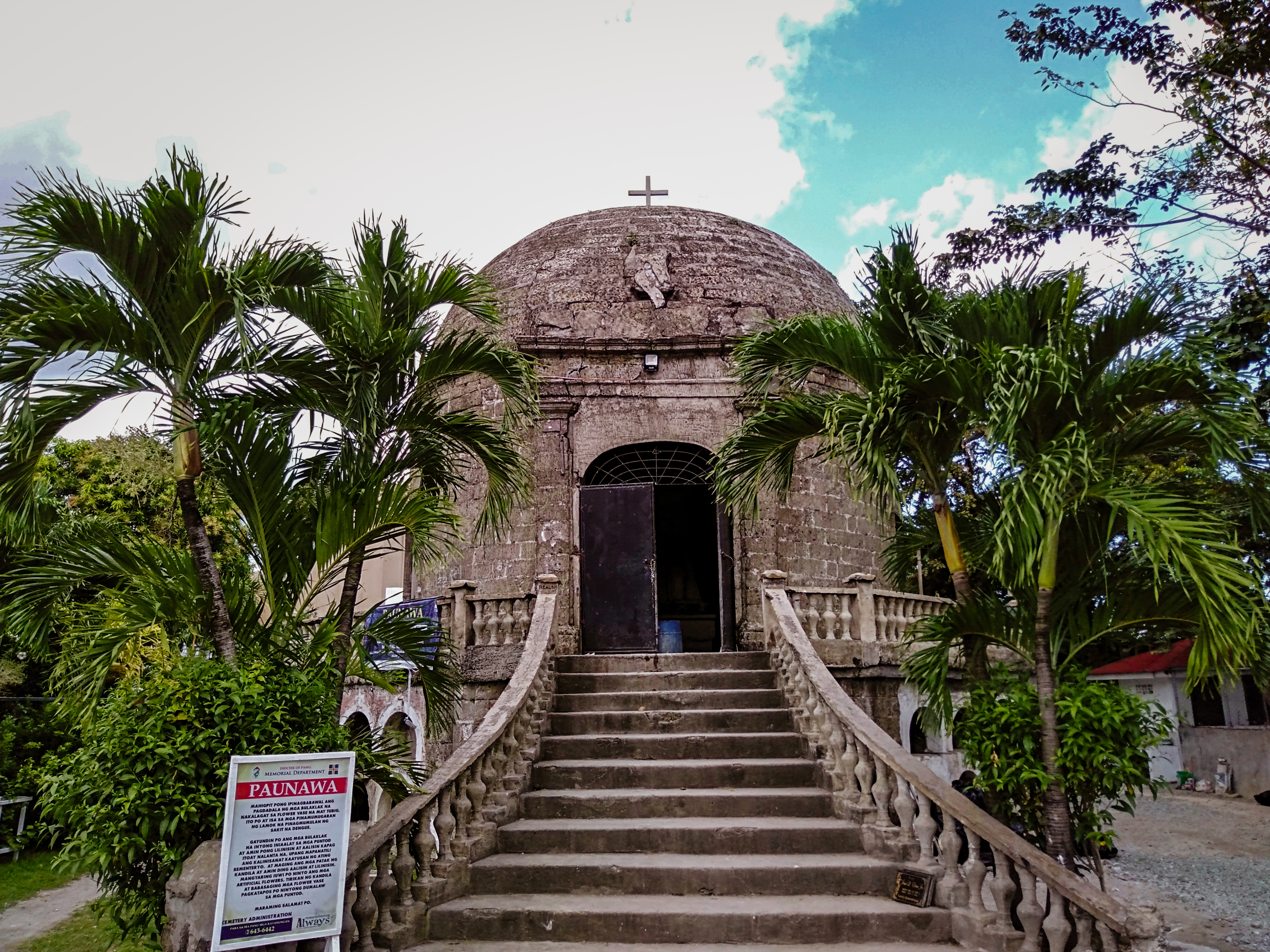
Simborio at Taguig Cemetery

Taguig was one of the earliest known territories of the Provincia de Tondo, that became the Provincia de Maynila to have been Christianized when the Spaniards succeeded in subjugating mainland Luzon through the Legazpi expedition in 1571. Between the years 1573 and 1587, Taguig was an encomienda under Captain Cervantes y Vergara with 3,200 inhabitants paying 1,879 and 1/2 tax. On September 4, 1584, Melchor De Ribera of the Augustian Order became the 1st non-resident Vicar of Taguig. Taguig was established as a separate "pueblo" (town) on April 4, 1587, "Tomamos de nuevo la casa de Tagui", when the Augustinian Order reaccepted the vote of the convent of Taguig during a meeting of the Augustinian Chapter in Intramuros according to Friar Gaspar de San Agustin. This is after the local Chinese community burned the old church made out of sawali in 1586. Juan Basi, a nephew of Lakan Dula and son-in-law of the Sultan of Brunei, was the Lakan of Taguig from 1587 to 1588 who participated in the Tondo Conspiracy of 1587, an attempt to overthrow the Spanish government which failed. Basi was exiled for two years as punishment. According to records, Taguig had nine barrios then, namely: Bagumbayan, Bambang, Hagonoy (Hagunoy), Palingon (Palingong), Santa Ana, Tipas, Tuktukan (Toctocan), Ususan, and Wawa (Uaua). Santa Ana was then the municipal center (poblacion) of Taguig.

There was an attempt to transfers Tipas from Taguig to Pasig because the residents of that barrio disliked the Cura or Parish Priest stationed at Taguig during that time. They raised it to the Gobernadorcillo (Leader and Judge) at that time, he said for the issue to be resolve the bells from Taguig and Pasig will be ring simultaneously. Which of these bells should be heard in Tipas will be town where it belongs to. The Bells of Taguig prevailed, that's why Tipas remained to be within the Jurisdiction of Taguig. Records also shows that Tipas had several attempts petitioning to become an independent town but was denied during the Spanish and American governments.

During that time, Taguig was accessible via the Pasig River, which was connected to two large bodies of water, Manila Bay and Laguna de Bay. The town produced more than enough rice for consumption but had less sugar cane to mill. The men lived through fishing while women wove cotton cloth and "sawali" from bamboo strips. The people of Taguig were known to have resisted both Spanish and American colonial rule. When the Katipunan was on its early years, many from Taguig became followers and later joined the uprising. The people of Taguig also joined the revolutionary government of General Emilio Aguinaldo on August 6, 1898.

Barrio Tipas, specifically the Napindan Lighthouse in Barrio Napindan became a meeting place and staging point of some revolutionary attacks against Spanish forces by the Katipunan.

==== Attempted transfer of town center ====
In the 1880 up to 1919, flood water submerged almost all the lower portion of Taguig from Napindan to Bagumbayan during the months of August up to October. The Hacenderos of Maysapan and Taguig proposed to transfer the Town center and church to a higher place now part of Fort Bonifacio. The parish priest also supported the move and ordered to ready a parcel of land to be ready to build a new church to house the convent. However, since the local population of Taguig, during that time, are farmers and fishermen, the decision to move the town center and church was not that popular to them. They didn't want to move out away from their farmland and to the river leading them to the bay. The remnant of the church is still visible until the 1970s. The place was called "Bahay Pari" (Priest House).

=== American rule (1898–1946) ===
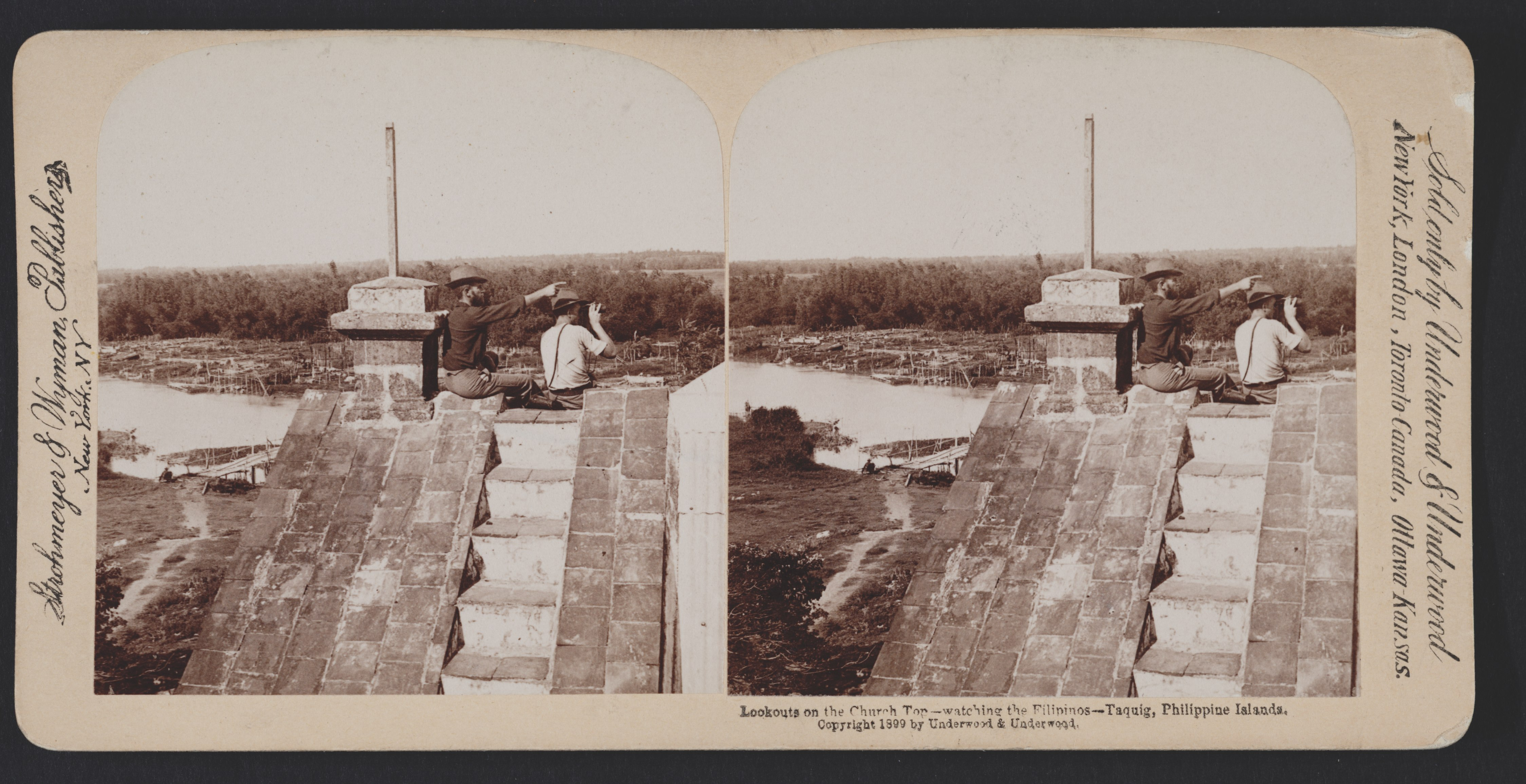
Lookouts atop Taguig Church in 1899

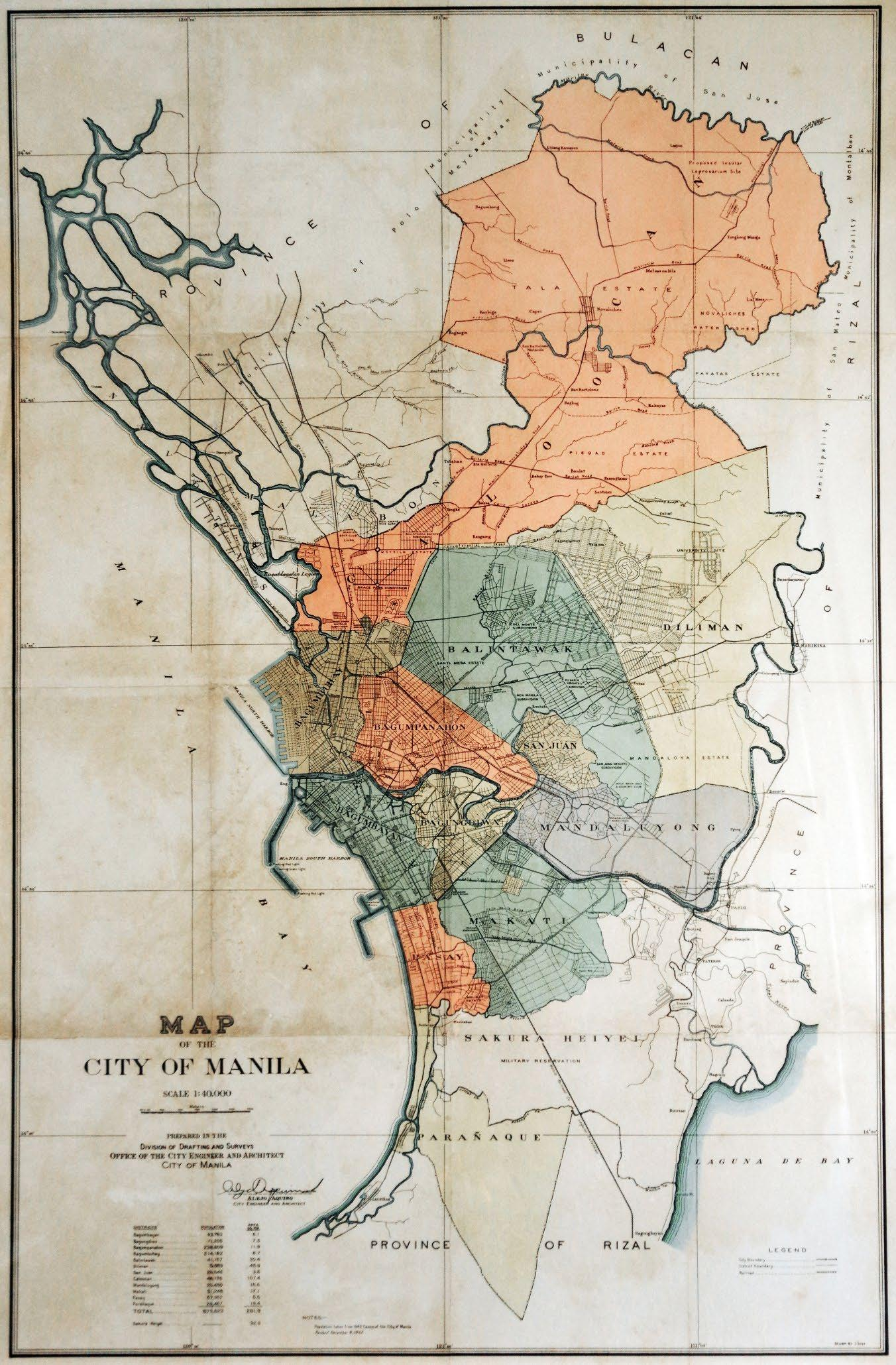
Map of the City of Greater Manila, showing the area of the Fort McKinley Military Reservation which was renamed by the Imperial Army as Sakura Heiyei (Cherry Blossom Barracks).

During the American occupation, Taguig natives fought against the forces of General Wheaton under the command of General Pio del Pilar. It was recorded that on February 6, 1899, Filipino forces including Taguig "revolutionarios" dislodged an American position in the hills of Taguig, now a portion of Pateros and Fort Bonifacio. They were defeated eventually by the Americans with superiority in the armaments and training. Taguig finally fell to the contingent of the First Washington Volunteer Infantry led by Col. Wholly.

The defeat of the Filipinos after two years of struggle against the American forces subsequently subjected the Philippines to another system of governance. On August 14, 1898, United States occupied the islands and established a military government with General Wesley Merritt as the First Military Governor. He exercised legislative powers until September 1, 1900. At the start of American occupation, Taguig was proclaimed as an independent municipality with the promulgation of General Order No. 4 on March 29, 1900. The town was subsequently incorporated to the newly created province of Rizal when the Philippine Commission promulgated Act No. 137 on June 11, 1901.

On October 12, 1903, Taguig, Muntinlupa and Pateros were merged by the virtue of Act. No. 942 to be known as the Municipality of Pateros, with Pateros hosting the seat of the municipal government. The merger did not last long as a month later Muntinlupa was separated from it and made part of Biñan, La Laguna when Act. No. 1008 was enacted on November 25, 1903. By this time, the Municipality of Pateros comprised the territory of Pateros and Taguig. Muntinlupa was later reintegrated to the Municipality of Pateros on March 22, 1905, with the promulgation Act No. 1308. The Act also renamed the Municipality of Pateros into the Municipality of Taguig, and the seat of government was transferred from Pateros to Taguig. Eventually, Pateros separated from Taguig by January 1, 1909, and Muntinlupa was granted an independent municipality status on December 17, 1917.

It was also during the American Colonial Period that the United States government acquired a 25.78 km^{2} (9.95 sq mi) property of Taguig for military purposes. This large piece of land, which had a TCT dated 1902, was turned into a camp that became known as Fort William McKinley, named after the 25th president of the U.S. who was responsible for the American colonization of the Philippines.

When the Japanese occupied the Philippines in 1942, Fort McKinley was taken over by the Japanese Imperial Army. Fort McKinley was renamed as Sakura Heiei (Cherry Blossom Barracks) and became one of their most important installation and expanded its network of tunnels which served as shelter of the high military officials. They occupied the military camp until the Battle of Manila in 1945, when the Japanese were cleared out by the American and Filipino forces.

=== Post-war period (1945–1986) ===
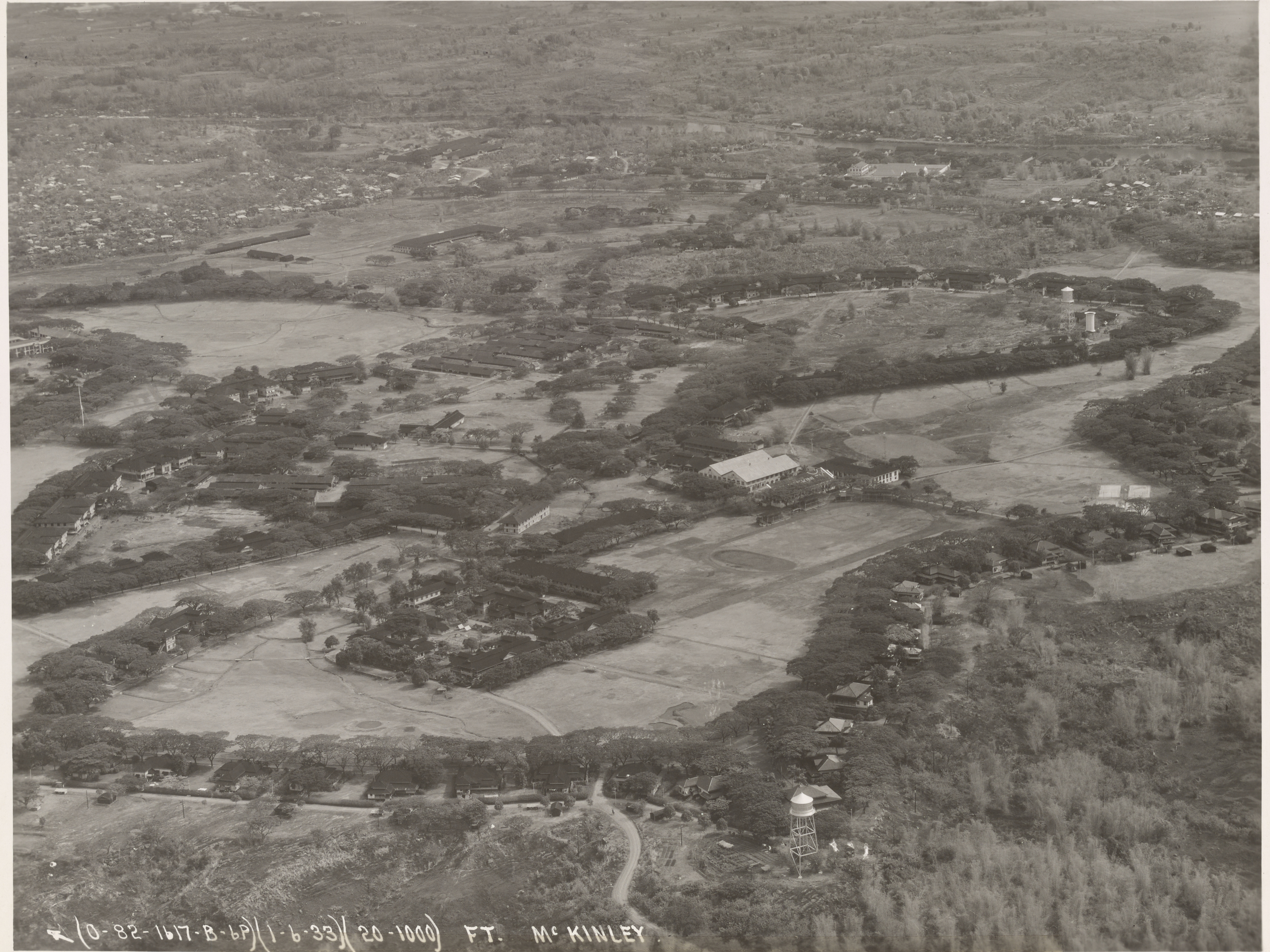
Fort William McKinley, now Fort Bonifacio, was surrendered by the United States to the Philippines in 1946

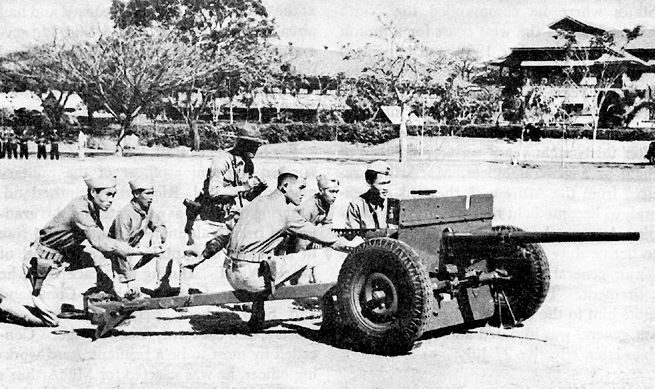
Philippine Scouts at Fort McKinley firing a 37-mm antitank gun in training.

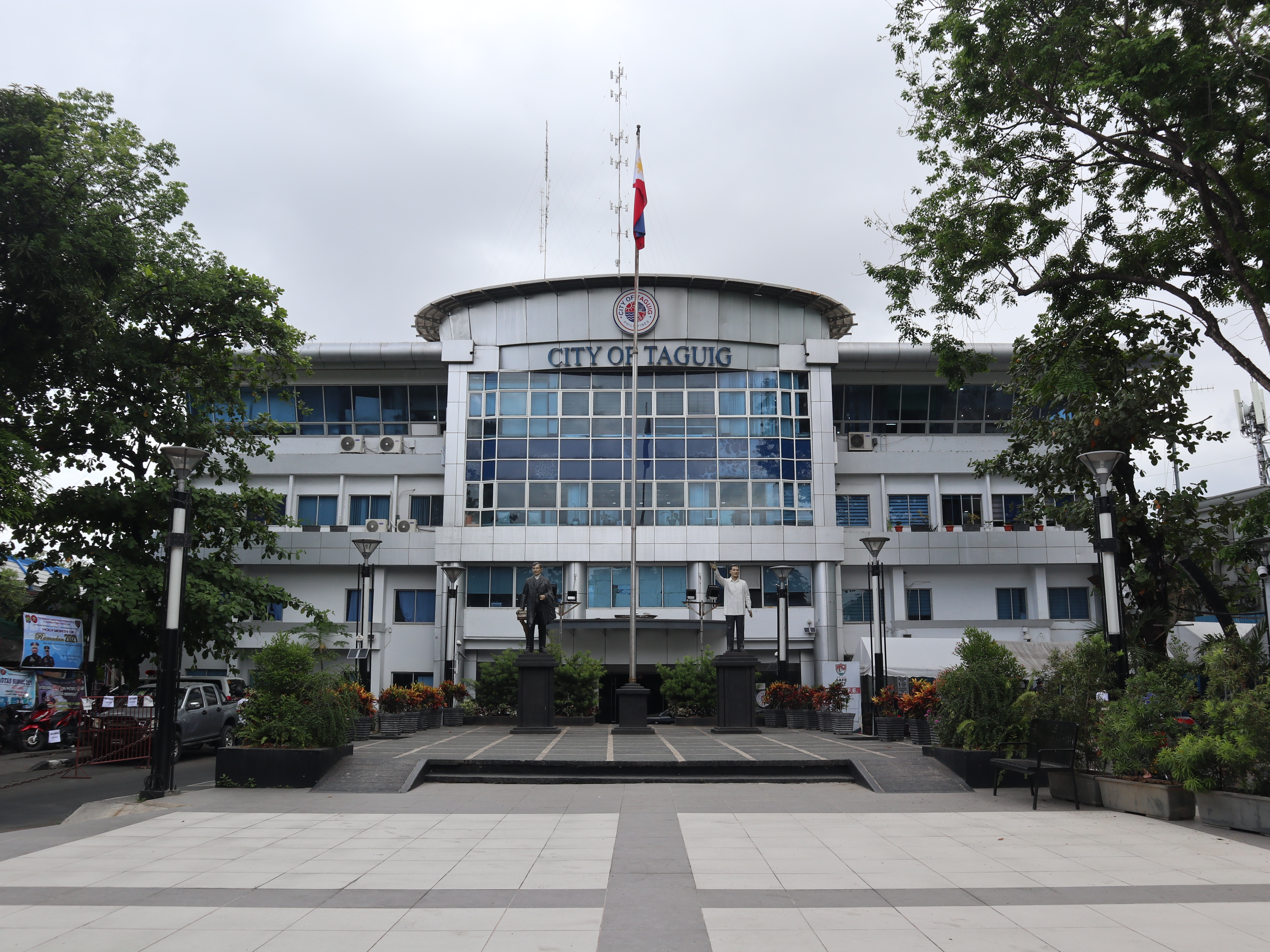
The third Taguig City Hall in Tuktukan served as Taguig's seat of government from 1959 to 2025.

After the Philippines gained its political independence from the United States on July 4, 1946, the US relinquished to the Republic of the Philippines all right of possession, jurisdiction, supervision and control over the Philippine territory except the use of the military bases. On May 14, 1949, Fort William McKinley was turned over to the Philippine government by virtue of the US Embassy Note No. 0570. Fort McKinley was made the permanent headquarters of the Philippine Army in 1957 and was subsequently renamed Fort Bonifacio after the Father of the Philippine Revolution against Spain, Andres Bonifacio. By virtue of Executive Order No. 311 signed by President Carlos P. Garcia on August 1, 1958, the municipal seat of government was transferred from Santa Ana to Tuktukan.

The Philippine government made plans to create settlements for military personnel within Fort Bonifacio. Settlements created are the Central Enlisted Men's Barrio (CEMBO) in 1949, the Riverside Enlisted Men's Barrio (REMBO) in 1954, Combat Enlisted Men's Barrio (COMEMBO) in 1957, the Panthers Enlisted Men's Barrios (PEMBO) in the 1960s, as well as the Enlisted Men's Signal Barrio in 1964, which later became Signal Village. Numerous barangays were carved out over the original settlements over time as population grows, and politics & governance evolves.

When President Ferdinand Marcos placed the Philippines under martial law in 1972, Taguig, which contained Fort Bonifacio, became the host of two detention centers full of political prisoners - the Maximum Security Unit (where Senators Jose W. Diokno and Ninoy Aquino were detained) and the Ipil Reception Center (sometimes called the Ipil Detention Center). A third facility, the Youth Rehabilitation Center (YRC), was still treated as part of Fort Bonifacio but was later turned into the Makati City Jail. These detention centers became infamous for the numerous human rights abuses of the Marcos dictatorship, including warrantless detention and torture. Ipil was the largest prison facility for political prisoners during martial law. Among the prisoners held there were some of the country's leading academics, creative writers, journalists, and historians including Butch Dalisay, Ricky Lee, Bienvenido Lumbera, Jo Ann Maglipon, Ninotchka Rosca, Zeus Salazar, and William Henry Scott. After Fort Bonifacio was privatized, the area in which Ipil was located became the area near S&R Membership Shopping - BGC and MC Home Depot, near 32nd Street and 8th Avenue in Bonifacio Global City.

In 1974, the name of Taguig's political subdivisions was changed from "barrios" to "barangays" following the nationwide implementation of the Integrated Reorganization Plan (IRP) under Presidential Decree No. 557. The IRP increased Taguig's administrative divisions to 18 barangays, namely: Bagong Tanyag, Bagumbayan, Bambang, Calzada Tipas, Hagonoy, Ibayo Tipas, Ligid Tipas, Lower Bicutan, Maharlika, Napindan, Palingon Tipas, Signal Village, Santa Ana, Tuktukan, Upper Bicutan, Ususan, Wawa, and Western Bicutan. On November 7, 1975, Taguig seceded from the province of Rizal to become part of the newly formed the National Capital Region through Presidential Decree No. 824.

=== Late 20th and early 21st centuries (1986–present) ===
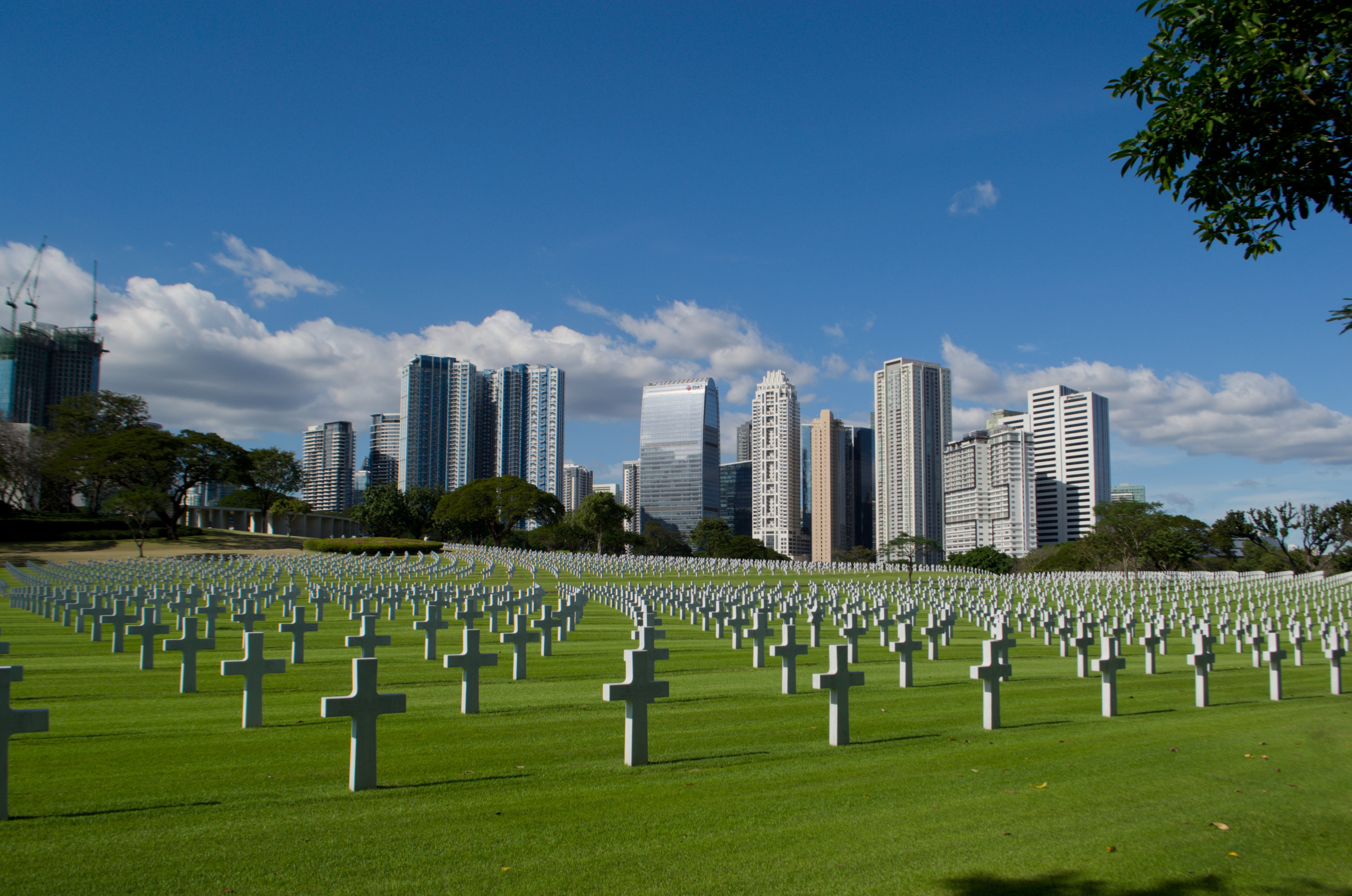
View of the skyline of Bonifacio Global City from the Manila American Cemetery in Fort Bonifacio

In 1986, President Ferdinand Marcos issued Proclamation No. 2475, which transferred control of the Fort Bonifacio area to Makati and reserved the area for military personnel and their dependents. The Municipality of Taguig then contested the presidential proclamation, which resulted in a territorial dispute with Makati.

On November 29, 1989, President Corazon Aquino issued Proclamation No. 498, honoring residents of Barrio Tipas, Tagig, who fought and died at the hands of Japanese forces.

In 1998, Republic Act No. 8487 was enacted, pushing for the cityhood of Taguig. The resulting plebiscite on April 25, 1998, showed that the citizens were against the cityhood. A recent petition to the Supreme Court sought a recount of the plebiscite and on February 19, 2004, the Supreme Court ordered the Commission on Elections to conduct a recount. The recount showed that the majority of residents did want the municipality of Taguig to become a city, with 21,105 "yes" and 19,460 "no". Subsequently, Taguig became a city on December 8, 2004.

In 2008, the Taguig City Council created ten new barangays – Central Bicutan, New Lower Bicutan, Fort Bonifacio, Katuparan, North Signal Village, South Signal Village, South Daanghari, North Daanghari, Pinagsama, San Miguel, and Tanyag – by virtue of City Ordinance Nos. 24–27, 57–61, 67–69, and 78, Series of 2008, carving them out from the initial 18 barangays. After a successful plebiscite in December 2008, the creation was approve, thus the number of barangays in the city was increased from 10 to 28.

In 2011, during 424th foundation day, Mayor Lani Cayetano took pride in calling the city a "Probinsyudad" (a portmanteau of Tagalog words of Spanish origin probinsya and syudad) because it is the only remaining city at that time in Metro Manila which has the amenities of a highly urbanized city and the features of a province. The city has more than 10 kilometers (6.2 mi) of lakeshore, and still has farmers, fishermen, old churches, historic buildings, and its citizens whose virtue of pagtutulungan (transl. cooperation) is still very much alive. The word "Probinsyudad" was registered as the city's trademark with the Intellectual Property Office of the Philippines (IPOPHL) in March 2024.

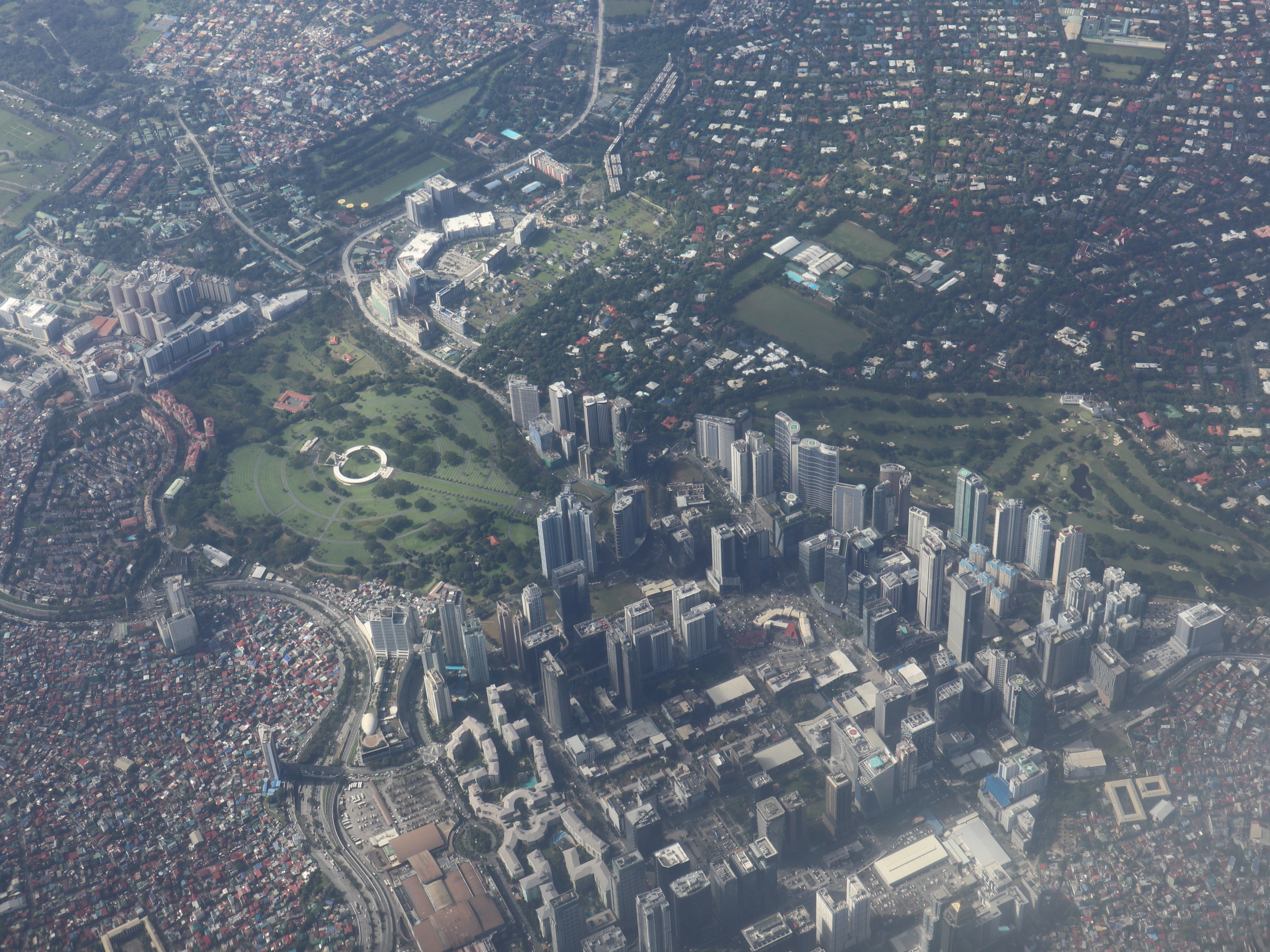
Aerial view of the Fort Bonifacio Military Reservation area, which was officially recognized as part of Taguig in 2023 following the Supreme Court's decision favoring Taguig in its decades-long territorial dispute with Makati.

By the turn of the 21st century, former military reservations in the Fort Bonifacio area were developed by the Bases Conversion and Development Authority (BCDA) into central business districts and mixed-use townships. These give rise to one of the Philippines' leading financial centers, the Bonifacio Global City (BGC). The BCDA also developed other townships in Fort Bonifacio area such as the Bonifacio Capital District and the McKinley Hill. Other mixed-developments within the city include the Acacia Estate and Scala Estate by Vista Land in the central part of the city, and Arca South by Ayala Land in Western Bicutan. In February 2018, the Philippine Stock Exchange moved its corporate office from Makati to BGC.

In March 2020, the city recorded its first case of COVID-19, a lawyer who works at BGC and has a history abroad of travelling to Japan. The city's response was widely regarded as successful, as it attained one of the lowest active cases per 100,000 population. It is also one of the local government units with the lowest case fatality rates in the country. Furthermore, the city focused on helping businesses when the economy reopens.

The decades-long territorial dispute with Makati was ruled with finality in favor of Taguig in April 2023. Bonifacio Global City and the surrounding ten Enlisted Men's Barrios (EMBO) barangays were officially recognized as part of Taguig. Jurisdiction of the ten Embo barangays were transferred from Makati to Taguig later that year. Meanwhile, the Schools Division Office of Taguig City gained the management and administration of 14 Embo public elementary and high schools, including the Makati Science High School, starting January 1, 2024. On September 25, 2024, the Embo barangays were apportioned to the two legislative districts of Taguig and Pateros with the adaptation of the House Concurrent Resolution No. 37. On May 5, 2025, the court ordered Makati to turnover to Taguig all the EMBO public facilities covered by Proclamation Nos. 518 and 1916, which gave Taguig full possession and access to EMBO health centers, covered courts, multipurpose buildings, parks, barangay halls and other public facilities.

The 2025 national and local elections was the first general election were the Embo barangays are part of the Taguig city electorate. The first Portal sculpture in Asia, known as the BGC Portal, was opened in the city on January 21, 2026. In the midst of the nationwide flood control projects scandal, Senator Panfilo Lacson revealed that his team has identified 32 anomalous projects in the city involving the Cayetano family, including alleged illegal reclamation at the Taguig Lakeshore. Meanwhile, Taguig citizens formed an anti-corruption group and called for an investigation of alleged ghost flood control projects worth ₱2.8 billion in the city. The Department of Public Works and Highways halts projects related to the alleged illegal reclamation in Taguig, while the Laguna Lake Development Authority, the national agency responsible for the preservation, development, and sustainability of Laguna de Bay stated that the Taguig city government did not coordinate with them.

== Geography ==
Taguig is located on the northwestern shores of Laguna de Bay, the largest lake in the Philippines. The city has a total area of 47.28 square kilometers (18.25 sq mi). The city is bordered by Pasig and Pateros to the north, Makati and Mandaluyong to the northwest, Pasay and Parañaque to the west, Taytay to the northeast, and Muntinlupa to the south. The Pasig River and its tributary, the Taguig River, run through the northern half of the city, while the Napindan River, another tributary of Pasig, and its feeder creek called Daang Manunuso forms the natural border between Taguig in Pasig. A relatively small area of the city called Ibayo Napindan is located north of the river, adjoining the disputed territories between Pasig, Taguig, and Taytay in Rizal Province. The cadastral map of Taguig shows that the northeastern border of the city is in Rio del Pueblo now called Tapayan River, a tributary of the Pasig River from Barangay Pinagbuhatan, Pasig to Barangay Santa Ana, Taytay, Rizal. The map shows that the city encompasses much of Nagpayong in Pinagbuhatan, Pasig and Lupang Arenda in Taytay.

=== Barangays and congressional districts ===
Maps of Taguig

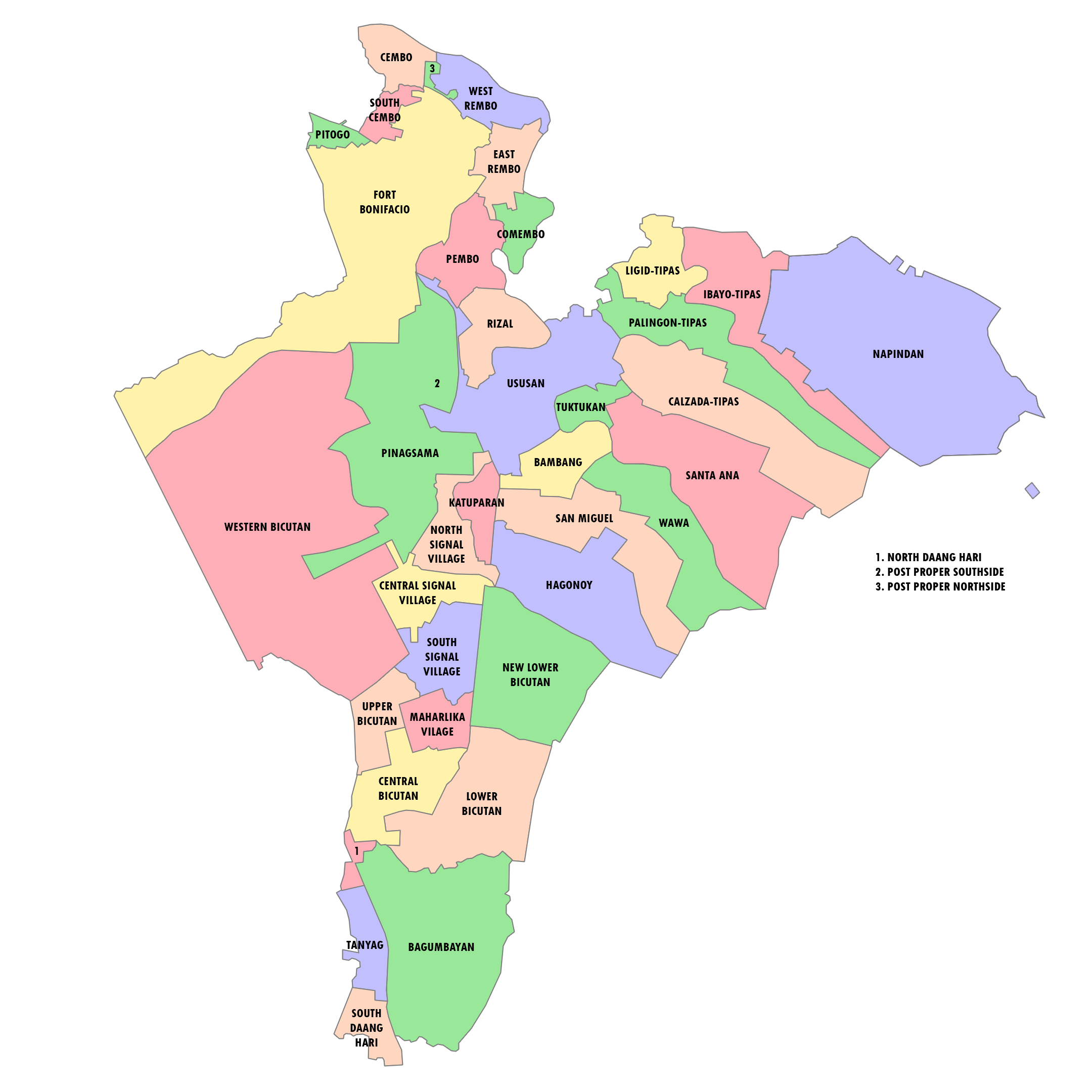
Political map of Taguig (Note: Portions of Post Proper Northside and the area Post Proper Southside are omitted due to unclear boundaries, with overlap mostly with Fort Bonifacio, Pinagsama, and Western Bicutan, resulting from Makati's previous claim disputes.)

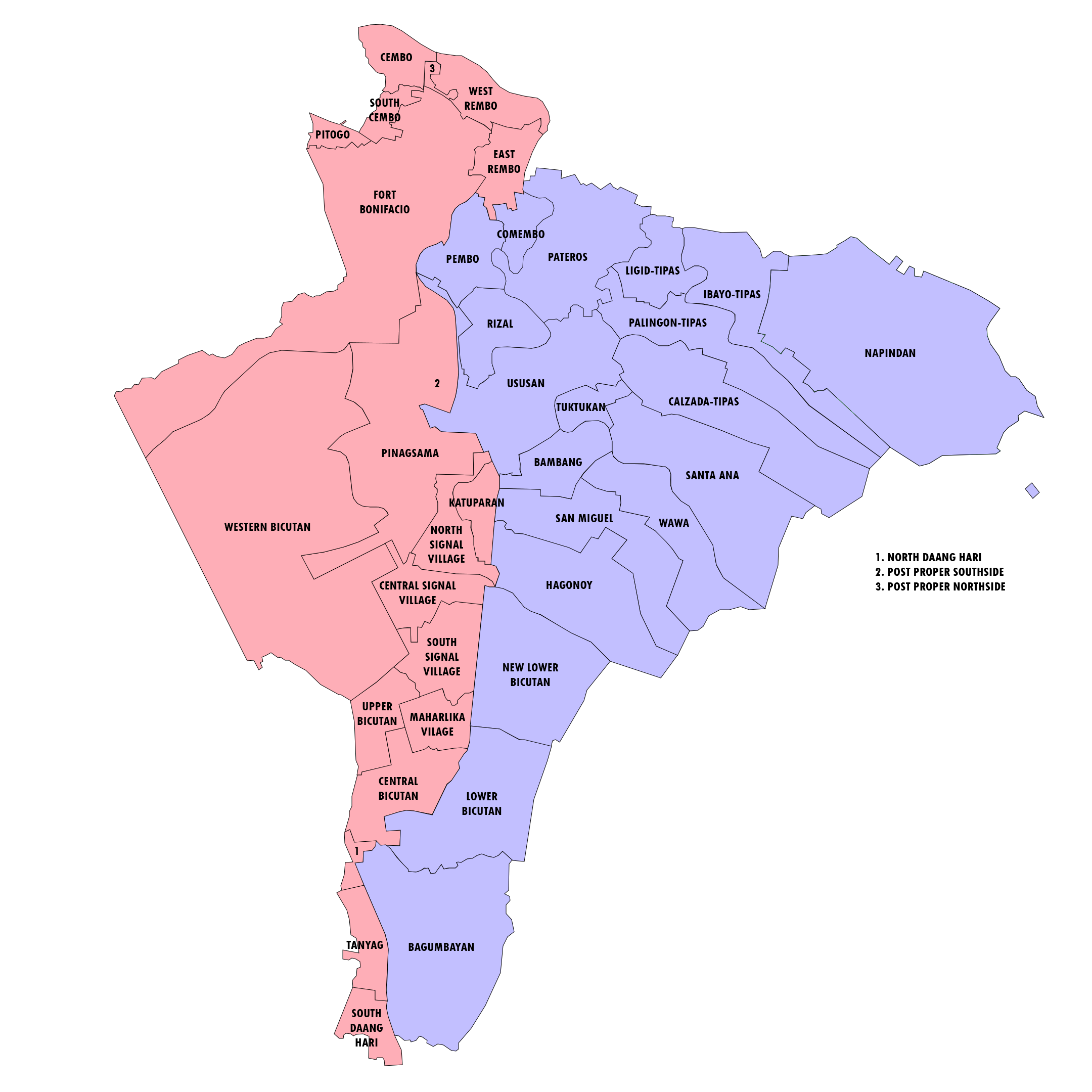
Legislative districts of the combined representation of Taguig–Pateros
Pateros–Taguig (District I)
Taguig (District II)

Taguig is politically subdivided into 38 barangays, ranking it fourth in NCR with the most number of barangays. These barangays are currently grouped into two congressional districts, with each district being represented by a congressman in the House of Representatives. The ten Embo barangays are the latest addition to its jurisdiction after the city won against its territorial dispute with Makati, increasing the city's territory and population. On September 25, 2024, the House of Representatives adopted House Concurrent Resolution No. 37, which apportioned the ten Embo barangays to the two legislative districts of Taguig and Pateros.

- Taguig–Pateros's Lone Congressional District (District I) covers the eastern half of the city, including the entirety of the Municipality of Pateros. The district covers an area of 22.11 square kilometers (8.54 sq mi) and includes the barangays of Bagumbayan, Bambang, Calzada, Comembo, Hagonoy, Ibayo-Tipas, Ligid-Tipas, Lower Bicutan, New Lower Bicutan, Napindan, Palingon, Pembo, Rizal, San Miguel, Santa Ana, Tuktukan, Ususan and Wawa.
- Taguig's Lone Congressional District (District II) covers the western portion of the city. It covers an area of 25.17 square kilometers (9.72 sq mi). It consists of the western Taguig barangays of Cembo, Central Bicutan, Central Signal Village, East Rembo, Fort Bonifacio, Katuparan, Maharlika Village, North Daang Hari, North Signal Village, Pinagsama, Pitogo, Post Proper Northside, Post Proper Southside, South Cembo, South Daang Hari, South Signal Village, Tanyag, Upper Bicutan, West Rembo and Western Bicutan.

District I
Barangay	Population (2024)		Area^{[a]}		ZIP Code	Established
			/km^{2}	/sq mi		
Bagumbayan	4.2%	55,160	3.62	1.40	1630	Since the establishment of Taguig
Bambang	1.2%	15,749	0.92	0.36	1637	Since the establishment of Taguig
Calzada-Tipas	2.5%	32,160	1.07	0.41	1630	July 15, 1971
Comembo	1.2%	16,299	0.27	0.10	1641	
Hagonoy	1.9%	25,455	1.62	0.63	1630	Since the establishment of Taguig
Ibayo-Tipas	2.2%	28,608	1.56	0.60	1630	July 15, 1971
Ligid-Tipas	0.8%	10,861	0.68	0.26	1638	July 15, 1971
Lower Bicutan	5.0%	65,652	2.35	0.91	1632	September 21, 1974
Napindan	2.1%	27,635	2.70	1.04	1630	September 21, 1974
New Lower Bicutan	4.5%	59,120	0.10	0.039	1632	December 18, 2008
Palingon-Tipas	1.5%	19,628	1.17	0.45	1630	Since the establishment of Taguig
Pembo	3.6%	47,030	0.64	0.25	1642	
Rizal	3.5%	46,061	0.59	0.23	1649	June 29, 1996
San Miguel	0.9%	11,833	0.99	0.38	1630	December 18, 2008
Santa Ana	1.8%	24,174	1.92	0.74	1630	Since the establishment of Taguig
Tuktukan	0.9%	12,414	0.31	0.12	1637	September 21, 1974
Ususan	4.2%	54,814	1.45	0.56	1639	Since the establishment of Taguig
Wawa	1.2%	15,930	1.38	0.53	1630	Since the establishment of Taguig
District II
Barangay	Population (2024)		Area^{[a]}		ZIP Code	Established
			/km^{2}	/sq mi		
Cembo	1.9%	25,468	0.22	0.085	1640	1949
Central Bicutan	2.9%	37,418	0.49	0.19	1631	December 18, 2008
Central Signal Village	3.6%	47,664	0.77	0.30	1633	December 18, 2008
East Rembo	2.1%	26,884	0.44	0.17	1643	
Fort Bonifacio	0.9%	12,140	16.26	6.28	1635	December 18, 2008
Katuparan	2.2%	29,321	0.30	0.12	1630	December 18, 2008
Maharlika Village	2.0%	26,241	0.51	0.20	1636	January 3, 1974
North Daang Hari	1.1%	14,614	0.14	0.054	1632	December 18, 2008
North Signal Village	2.8%	36,487	0.62	0.24	1630	December 18, 2008
Pinagsama	4.6%	59,759	0.19	0.073	1630	December 18, 2008
Pitogo	1.2%	16,244	0.14	0.054	1646	1956
Post Proper Northside	4.8%	62,277	2.37	0.92	1647	December 11, 1972
Post Proper Southside	5.2%	68,388	3.41	1.32	1648	September 21, 1974
South Cembo	1.2%	15,458	0.20	0.077	1645	December 31, 1966
South Daang Hari	1.9%	25,037	0.17	0.066	1632	December 18, 2008
South Signal Village	3.4%	43,946	0.80	0.31	1633	December 18, 2008
Tanyag	1.9%	24,705	0.40	0.15	1630	December 18, 2008
Upper Bicutan	3.6%	47,397	1.44	0.56	1633	September 21, 1974
West Rembo	2.3%	30,157	0.55	0.21	1644	
Western Bicutan	6.9%	89,897	3.55	1.37	1630	September 21, 1974
Total		1,308,085	47.28	18.25		

=== Territorial disputes ===
Contested territories between Makati, Pateros and Taguig.

Taguig was involved in a territorial dispute with Makati and Pateros. In 1993, Taguig filed a complaint against Makati over the entirety of Fort Bonifacio and the Enlisted Men's Barangays (EMBOs), claiming these areas were within its territory. The complaint also alleged that Presidential Proclamation Nos. 2475, s. 1986, and 518, s. 1990, were unconstitutional for altering Taguig's boundaries without a plebiscite. In 2011, the Pasig Regional Trial Court upheld Taguig's claim over the Fort Bonifacio Military Reservation, including the EMBO barangays, and ordered Makati to stop exercising jurisdiction over these areas. The Supreme Court of the Philippines affirmed this ruling with finality on April 27, 2022, declaring that Bonifacio Global City and the surrounding EMBO barangays were under Taguig's jurisdiction.

Moreover, in around 2001, Taguig and Parañaque resolved a territorial dispute, agreeing that the Bicutan Market and the Bicutan Interchange, which involves the South Luzon Expressway, would be part of Parañaque. Before the agreement, both the city of Parañaque and the then municipality of Taguig actually disowned the ownership of the area due to the proliferation of informal settlers, significant amounts of uncollected garbage, and heavy traffic conditions on the roads.

=== Geology ===
The West Valley fault of the Marikina Valley Fault System traverses barangays Comembo, East Rembo, Pembo, Post Proper Southside, Rizal, Pinagsama, South Signal Village, North Signal Village, South Daang Hari, Central Bicutan, Ususan, Upper Bicutan, Central Signal Village, Maharlika Village, Lower Bicutan, Bagumbayan and Bagong Tanyag. (Note: Reference lists barangays Comembo, East Rembo, Pembo, Post Proper Southside and Rizal when they were part of Makati as it was published before the 2022 Supreme Court ruling) Areas of the city prone to liquefaction includes sections of Circumferential Road 5 (C-5 Road) and the barangays of North Signal Village, Central Signal Village, South Signal Village and Pinagsama because they are situated on clay loam soil and are near Laguna de Bay.

=== Climate ===
Taguig

Climate chart (precipitation, max. and min. temperature)
J	F	M	A	M	J	J	A	S	O	N	D
69 30 22	56 31 23	41 32 24	46 34 26	107 33 26	203 32 26	277 31 25	295 31 25	251 31 25	236 31 25	203 31 24	183 30 23
- █ Average max. and min. temperatures in °C
- █ Precipitation totals in mm
- Source: Weather Spark
Imperial conversion
J	F	M	A	M	J	J	A	S	O	N	D
2.7 86 72	2.2 87 73	1.6 90 75	1.8 93 78	4.2 91 79	8 90 78	11 88 77	12 87 77	9.9 87 77	9.3 87 77	8 87 75	7.2 86 73
- █ Average max. and min. temperatures in °F
- █ Precipitation totals in inches

Under the Köppen climate classification system, Manila has a tropical monsoon climate (Köppen Am), closely bordering on a tropical savanna climate (Köppen Aw). The climate of Taguig is characterized by two types of season: dry season from November to April, and wet season from May to October. Rainfall is less evenly distributed. Together with the rest of the Philippines, Taguig lies entirely within the tropics.

Tropical cyclones are relatively common, which resulted in flashfloods in low-lying areas of the city, especially those near major rivers and the Laguna de Bay. In 2009, Typhoon Ketsana hit Metro Manila, and the City of Taguig is one of the worst hit areas in the capital region when flood water inundate almost the whole city.

Climate data for Taguig
Month	Jan	Feb	Mar	Apr	May	Jun	Jul	Aug	Sep	Oct	Nov	Dec	Year
Mean daily maximum °C (°F)	30 (86)	30.5 (86.9)	32 (90)	34 (93)	33 (91)	32 (90)	31 (88)	30.5 (86.9)	30.5 (86.9)	30.5 (86.9)	30.5 (86.9)	30 (86)	31.2 (88.2)
Daily mean °C (°F)	26 (79)	26.5 (79.7)	28 (82)	29.5 (85.1)	30 (86)	28.5 (83.3)	28 (82)	27.5 (81.5)	27.5 (81.5)	27.5 (81.5)	27.5 (81.5)	26.5 (79.7)	27.8 (81.9)
Mean daily minimum °C (°F)	22 (72)	23 (73)	24 (75)	25.5 (77.9)	26 (79)	25.5 (77.9)	25 (77)	25 (77)	25 (77)	25 (77)	24 (75)	23 (73)	24.4 (75.9)
Average precipitation mm (inches)	68.5 (2.70)	56 (2.2)	41 (1.6)	46 (1.8)	107 (4.2)	203 (8.0)	277 (10.9)	295 (11.6)	251 (9.9)	236 (9.3)	203 (8.0)	183 (7.2)	1,966.5 (77.4)
Average rainy days	8	6	5	6	11	16	19	20	18	17	15	14	155
Mean daily daylight hours	11.5	11.5	12	12.5	13	13	13	12.5	12	12	11.5	11.5	12.2
Source 1: Meteoblue (modeled/calculated data, not measured locally)
Source 2: NOAA

=== Natural hazards ===
The West Valley Fault runs through the middle-eastern part of Taguig, traversing 16 barangays of the city from north to south. The fault is capable of producing large scale earthquakes on its active phases with a magnitude of 7 or higher. The lowland areas along the coasts of Laguna de Bay and areas adjacent to the city's major rivers are susceptible to flooding.

== Cityscape ==
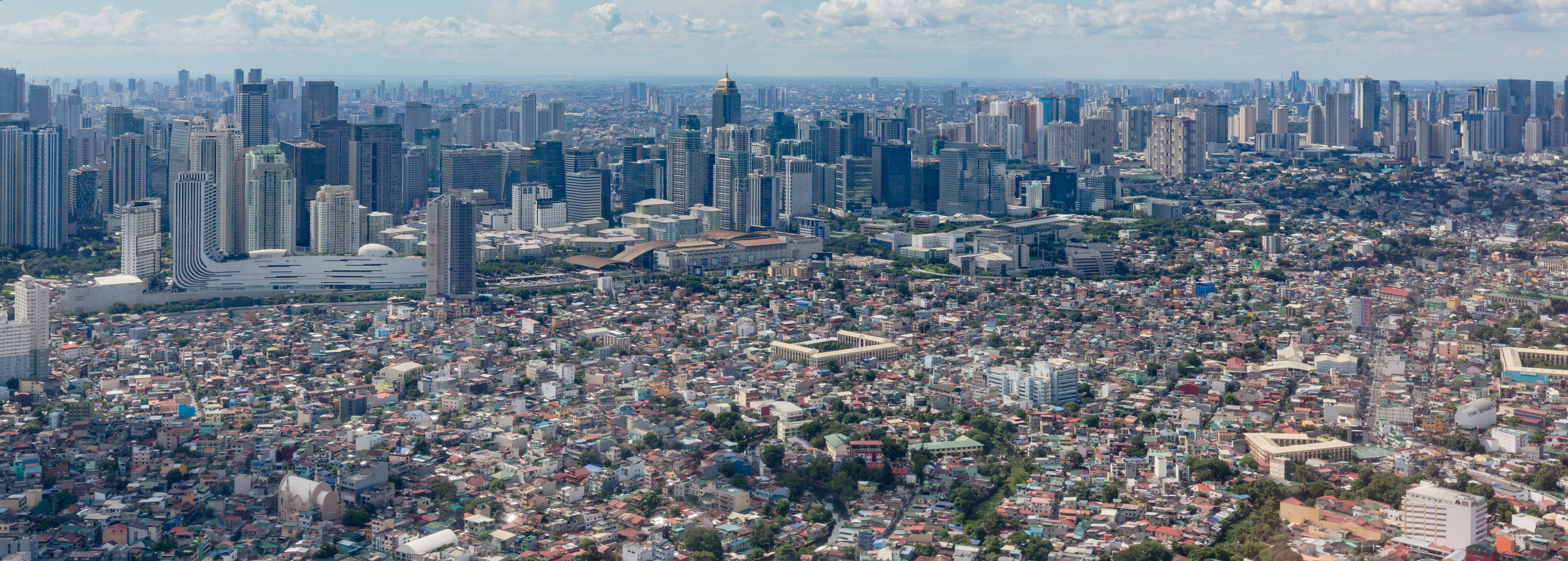
Aerial view of Fort Bonifacio, Bonifacio Global City and the Embo barangays, 2023.

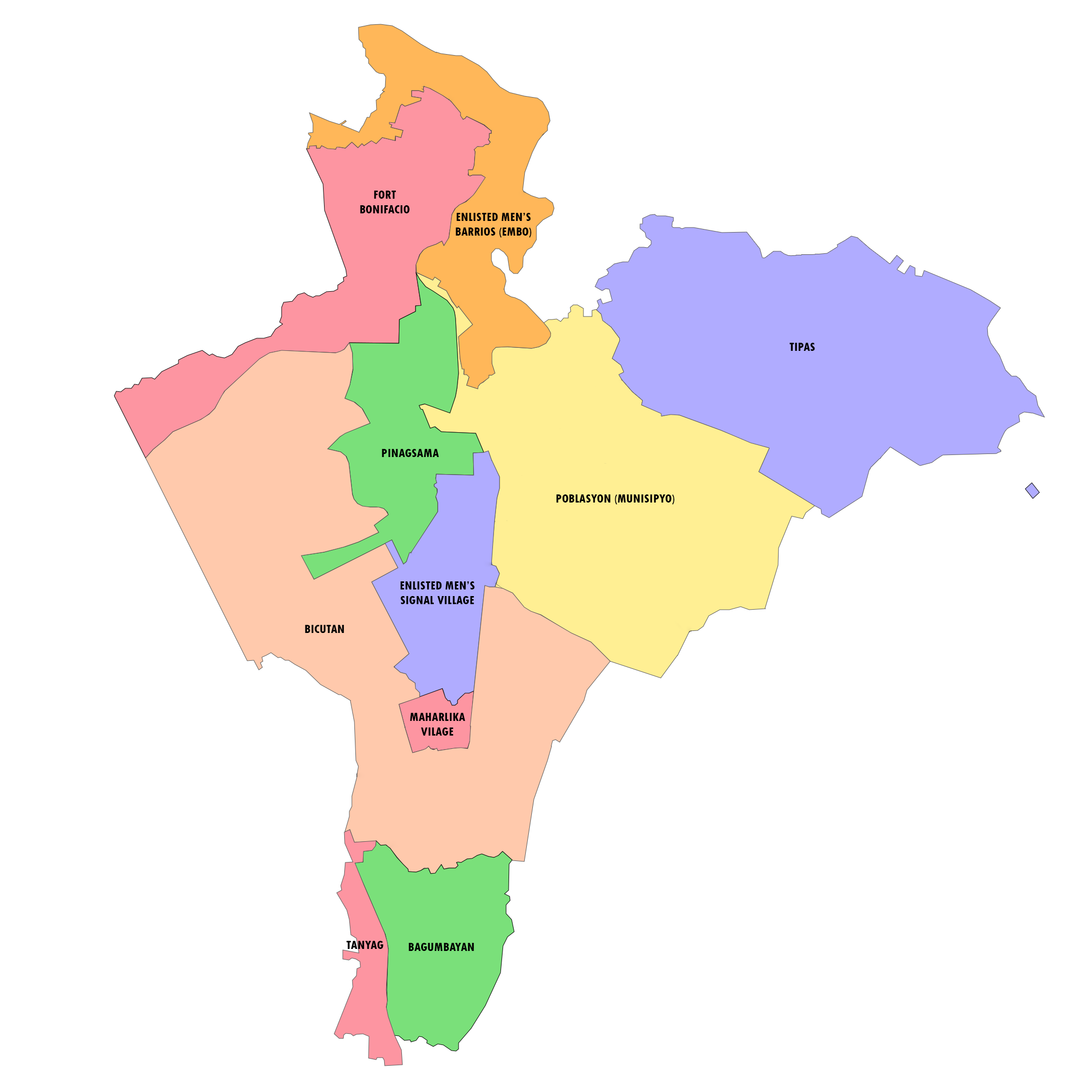
Map of the city districts of Taguig

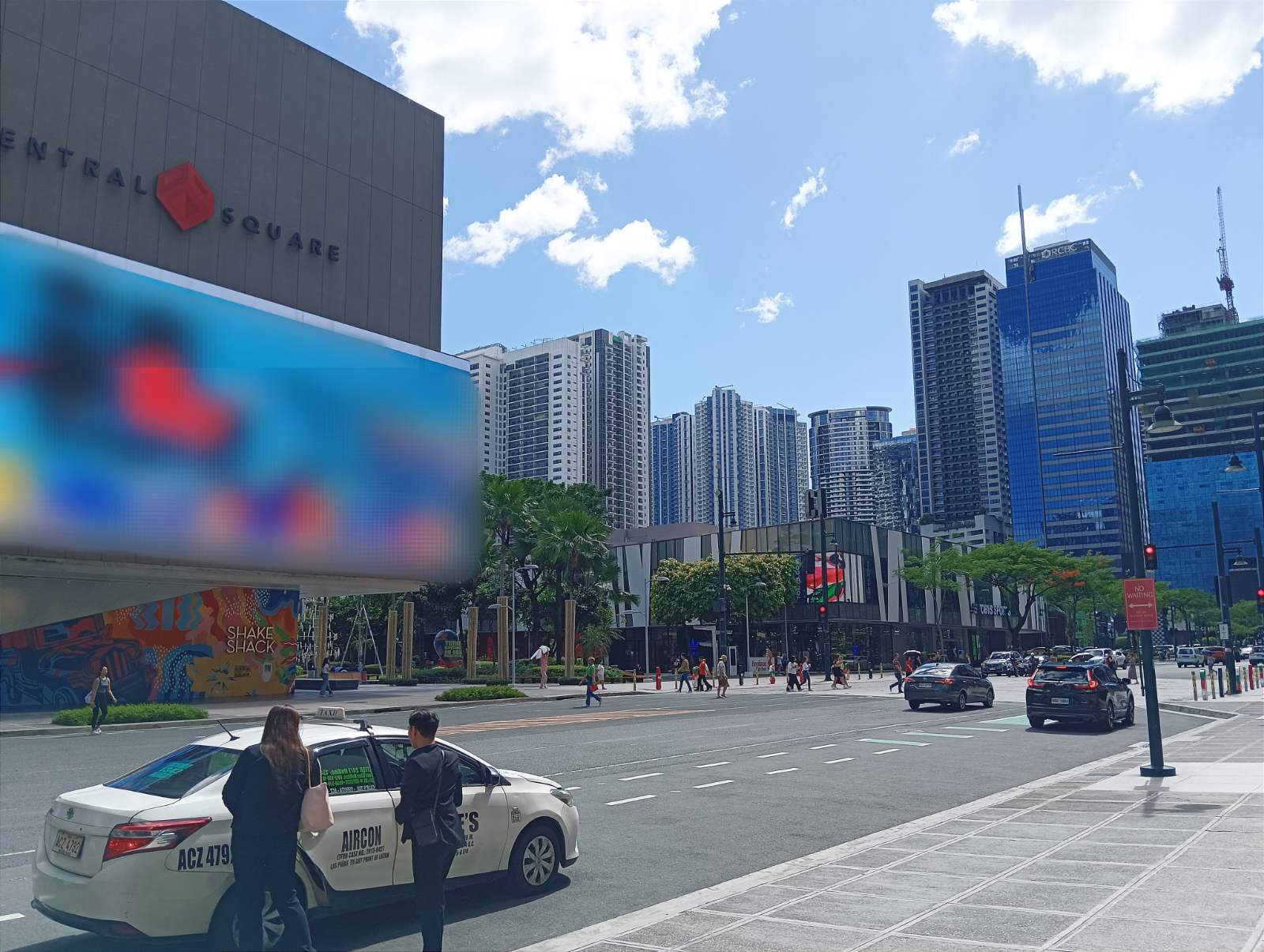
Bonifacio High Street as seen on 5th Avenue.

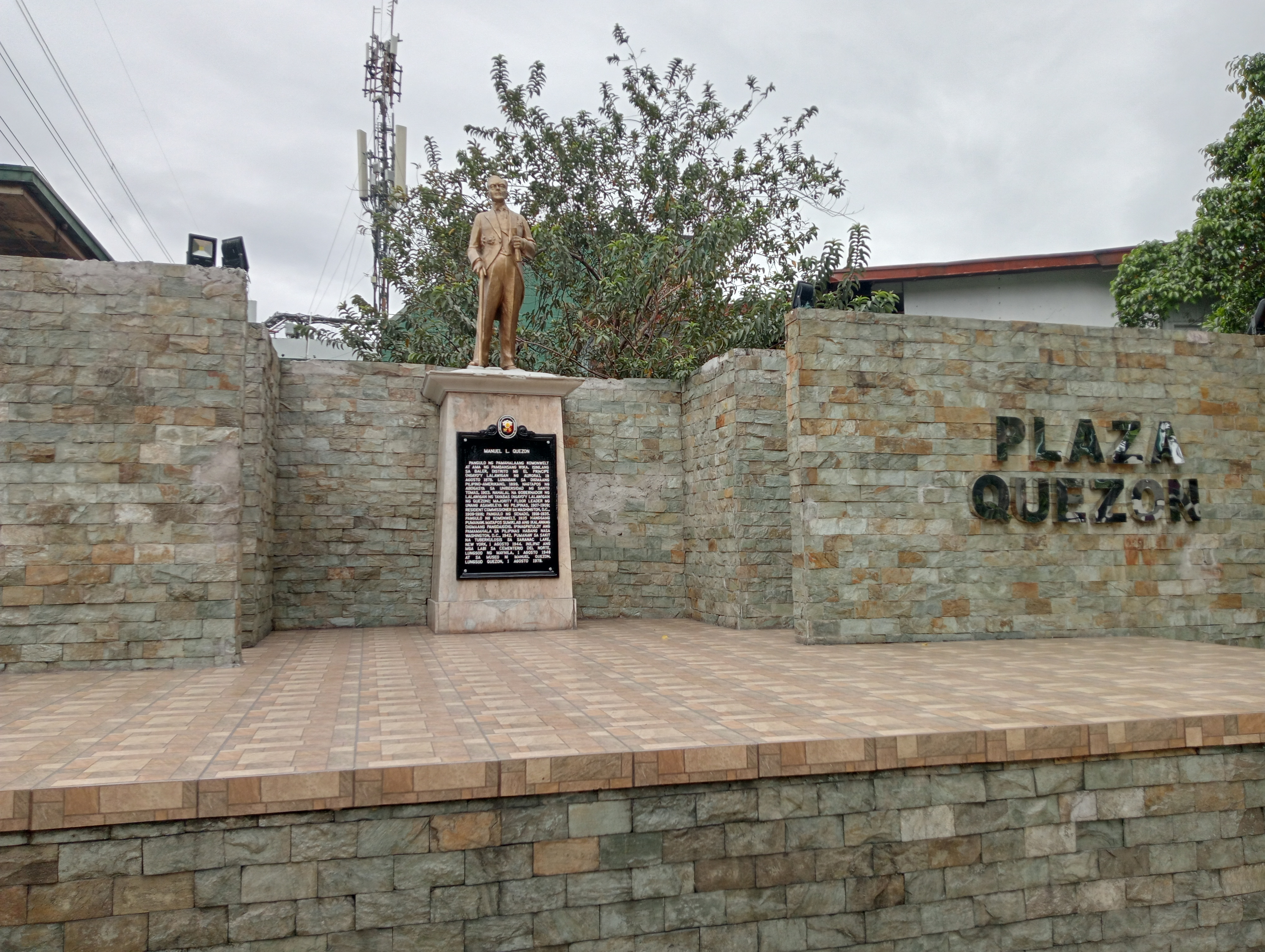
Plaza Quezon in Santa Ana is included in the Philippine Registry of Heritage by virtue of City Council Resolution No. 637.

The city is generally divided into many districts. The districts and neighborhoods naturally developed piecemeal as opposed to centrally planned, especially the 10 Embo barangays which were mostly developed by Makati prior to their transfer to the jurisdiction of Taguig. The decentralized nature of development gave the informal districts a unique identity, and at times gave border districts shared characteristics with neighboring cities and municipalities instead. The informal districts of the city include:

- Poblacion: The city's historical town center and home to most of its local government and heritage sites, thus the district is also colloquially called Munisipyo. Six of the city's nine original barrios are within this district. It is made up of barangays Ususan, Wawa, Santa Ana, Tuktukan, Bambang, Hagonoy, and San Miguel.
- Tipas: This district forms two of the city's original barrios, it is notable for trying to secede from Taguig in the 1930s to form the district as its own municipality. It is the primary base of the city's fishermen due to its proximity to the mouth of Pasig River and Laguna de Bay. It also hosts some industrial sites that spilled over from the industrial complex of neighboring Kalawaan in Pasig. It is made up of barangays Ibayo-Tipas, Ligid-Tipas, Calzada-Tipas, Palingon, and Napindan
- Bicutan: A predominantly residential area formed by President Diosdado Macapagal's Proclamation No. 423 that revoked its military reservation status. The district hosts most of the city's pre-BGC major educational institutions. Large campuses of national government agencies are also located within the district (Libingan ng Mga Bayani, TESDA, DOST, and Camp Bagong Diwa), as well as the new Arca South business district carved out of the FTI complex. Once a single large barangay upon its establishment, it is now made up of barangays Western Bicutan, Upper Bicutan, Central Bicutan, Lower Bicutan, New Lower Bicutan, and parts of North Daang Hari.
- Tanyag: A residential district in the city's southwestern tip named after the city's longest serving mayor, Monico Tanyag. Originally considered as part of Bicutan, its isolation gave rise into a residential area navigable by narrow alleys and a single main two lane road, sandwiched between the industrial areas of Bagumbayan, the railroad tracks, and the industrial sites along East Service Road under the jurisdiction of Brgy. San Martin de Porres, Parañaque City. It is made of barangays Tanyag, North Daang Hari, and South Daang Hari. These three barangays were formerly a single barangay known as Bagong Tanyag.
- Bagumbayan: The last Spanish formed district of the city located at its southern tip, and one of the original nine barrios of Taguig. It hosts most of the city's industrial areas and is also home to a lakeshore community.
- Maharlika Village: The Muslim community created by President Ferdinand E. Marcos' Proclamation No. 1217. The Muslim neighborhoods also sprawl into the border areas of neighboring Upper Bicutan, Central Bicutan, Lower Bicutan, and New Lower Bicutan.
- Signal Village: The area was formed as an Enlisted Men's village for military personnel, similar to the Embo barangays. Once a single large barangay, the district is now made up of barangays Central Signal, North Signal, South Signal, and Katuparan.
- Fort Bonifacio/BGC: Originally a military camp, it now hosts the city's main business districts of Bonifacio Global City, McKinley West, and McKinley Hill. Despite being separate CBD developments, these commercial areas are colloquially referred together as BGC due to the prominence of the former. It also hosts various armed service headquarters and installations, as well as various gated communities for AFP and PNP officers and personnel. The district encompasses barangays Fort Bonifacio, Pinagsama, parts of Ususan, and parts of Western Bicutan, being the de facto controlled parts of the city prior to the Makati border dispute resolution. Post Proper Northside and Post Proper Southside had overlapping territorial claims in the area, while the Embo Barangays are informally included due to their proximity, historical affinity, and the lumping of Makati's previous claims to the area.
- Embo: The city's newly added district, formed by the barangays surrounding Fort Bonifacio/BGC regained from the territorial dispute with Makati. It is made up of barangays Cembo, South Cembo, East Rembo, West Rembo, Comembo, Pitogo, Pembo, and Rizal. The two Inner Fort barangays of Post Proper Northside and Post Proper Southside were also considered as part of the Embo district. The ten barangays formerly made up the majority of Makati's second congressional district.
- C5/Pinagsama: Various residential areas and villages along both sides of Circumferential Road 5. These are mainly Taguig controlled areas during the border dispute. It also hosts the Heritage Park cemetery. Made up of Pinagsama (Pinagsama Phase 1 and 2, AFP/PNP Housing, EP Village, Centennial Village, Palar), Parts of Fort Bonifacio (Minipark), Parts of Western Bicutan (Sitio Masigasig, Balatan), Parts of Ususan (Logcom, Aranai, Wildcat Village, Pamayanang Diego Silang, MRB), and de facto controlled parts of Post Proper Southside (Palar), and Rizal (Maysapang). Other residential areas along C5 under the control of the Embo barangays (East Rembo, West Rembo, Pembo, Rizal) are not considered part of this district.
Selection of places and neighborhoods in Taguig

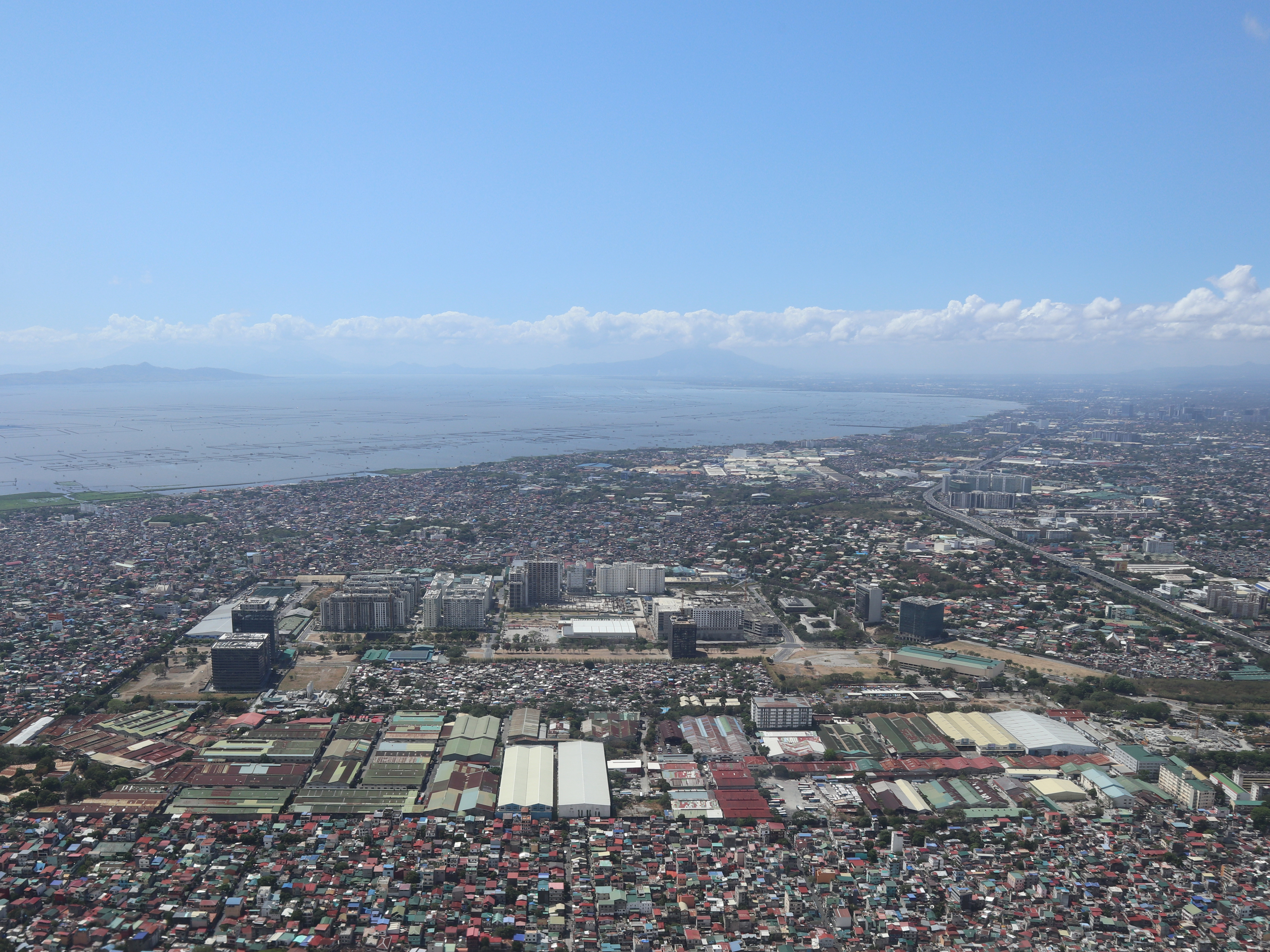
Bicutan

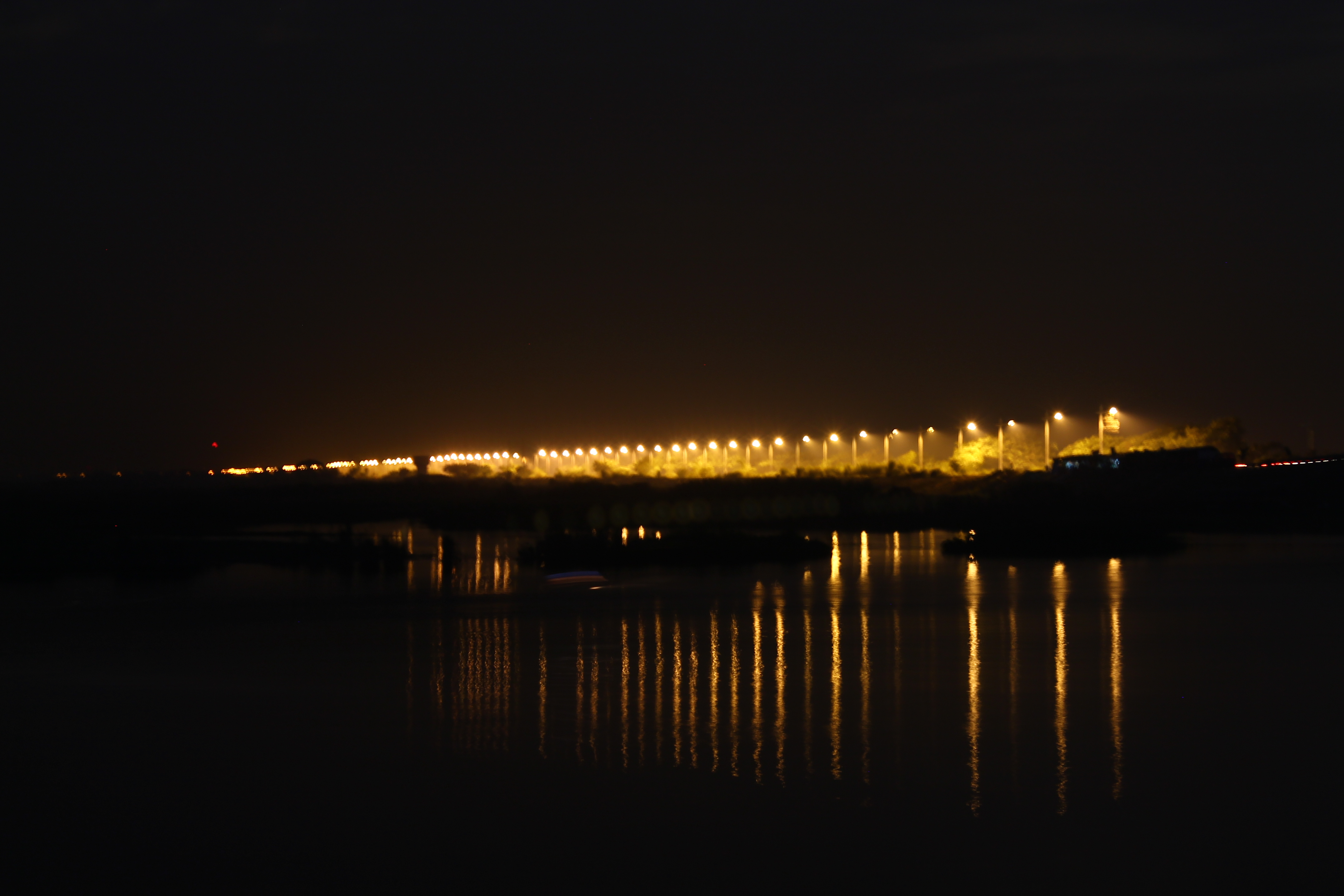
Circumferential Road 6

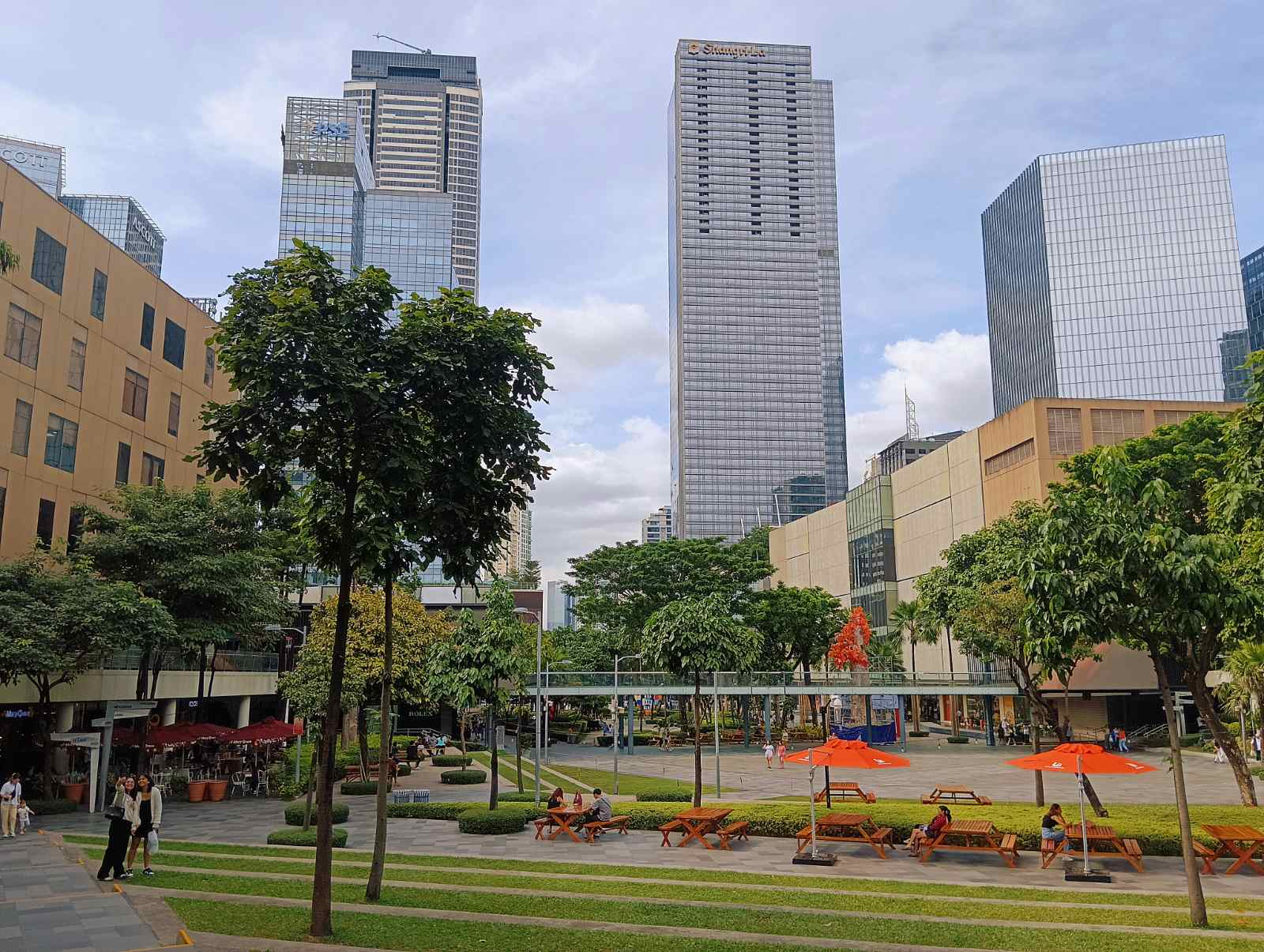
Bonifacio High Street

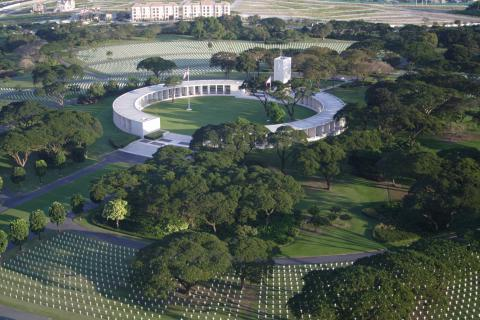
Manila American Cemetery and Memorial

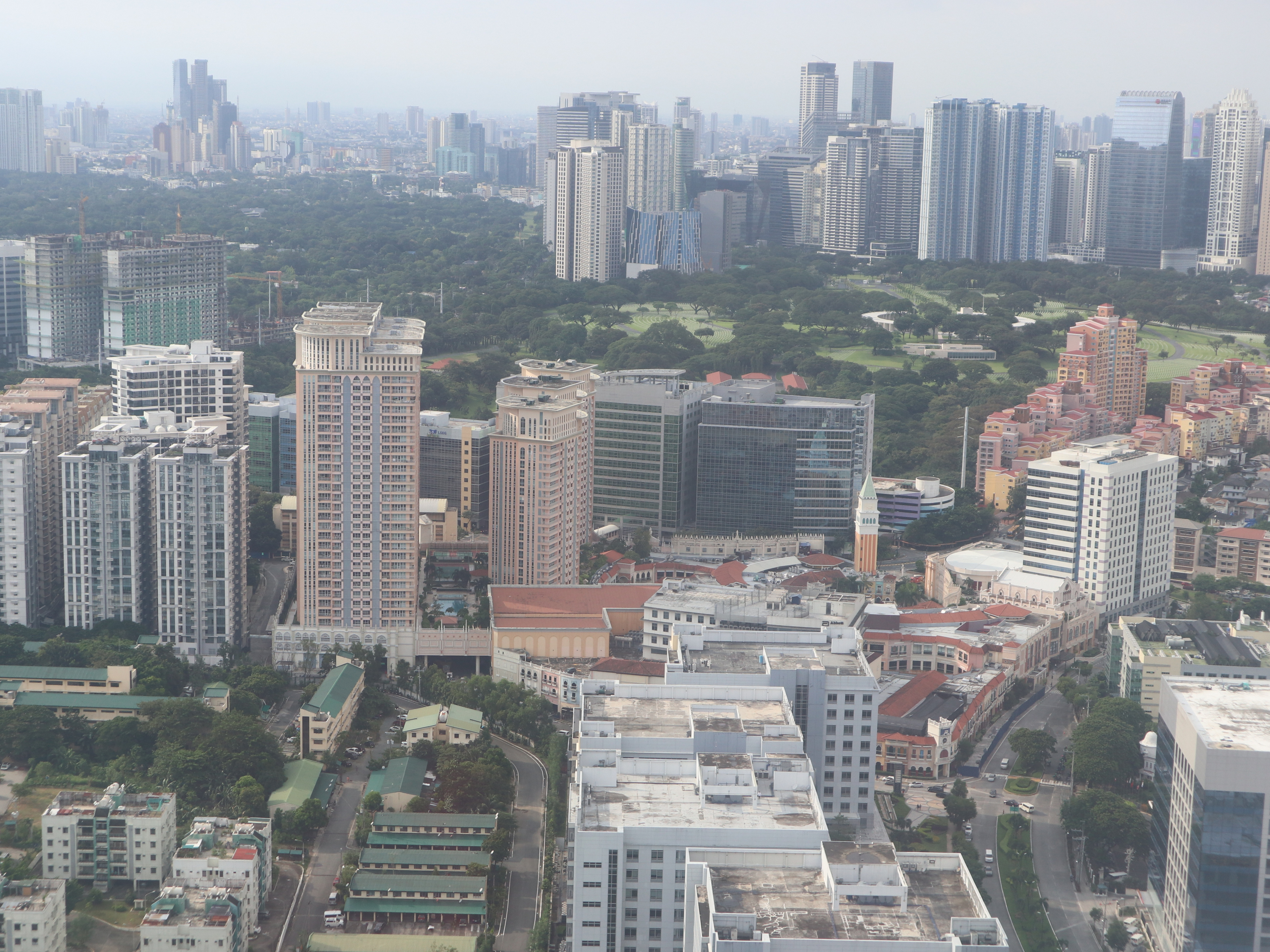
McKinley Hill

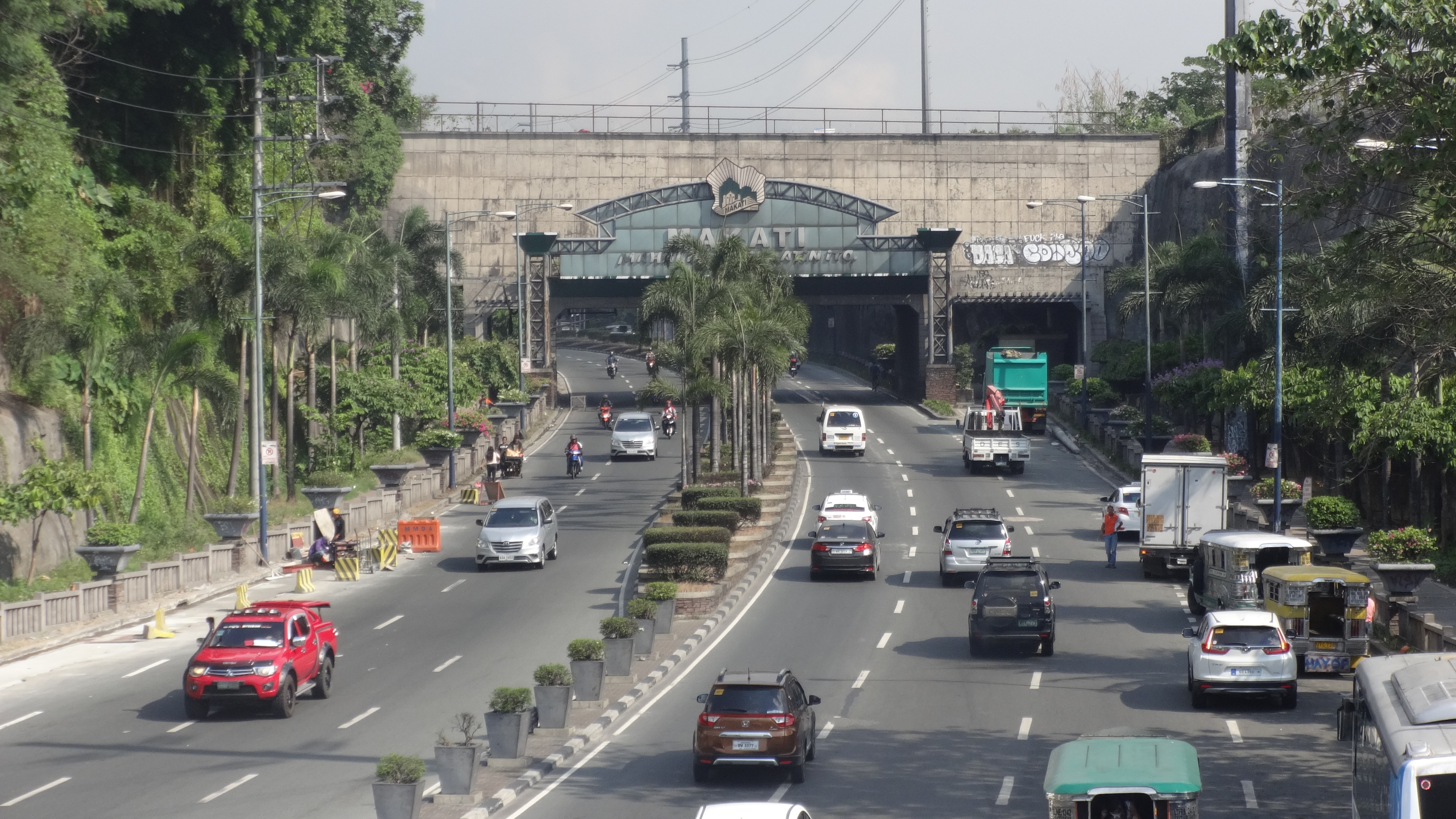
Kalayaan Avenue

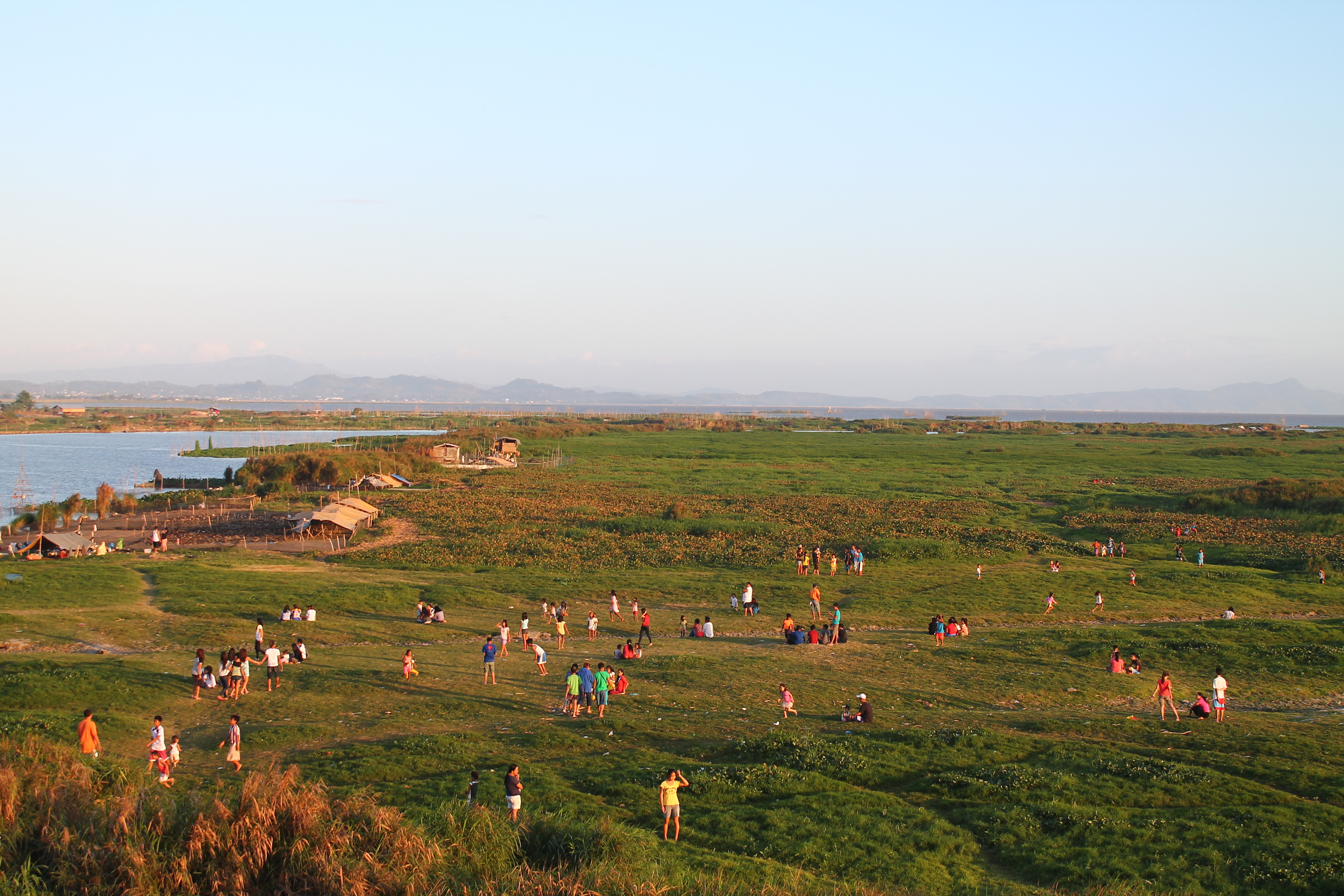
Napindan

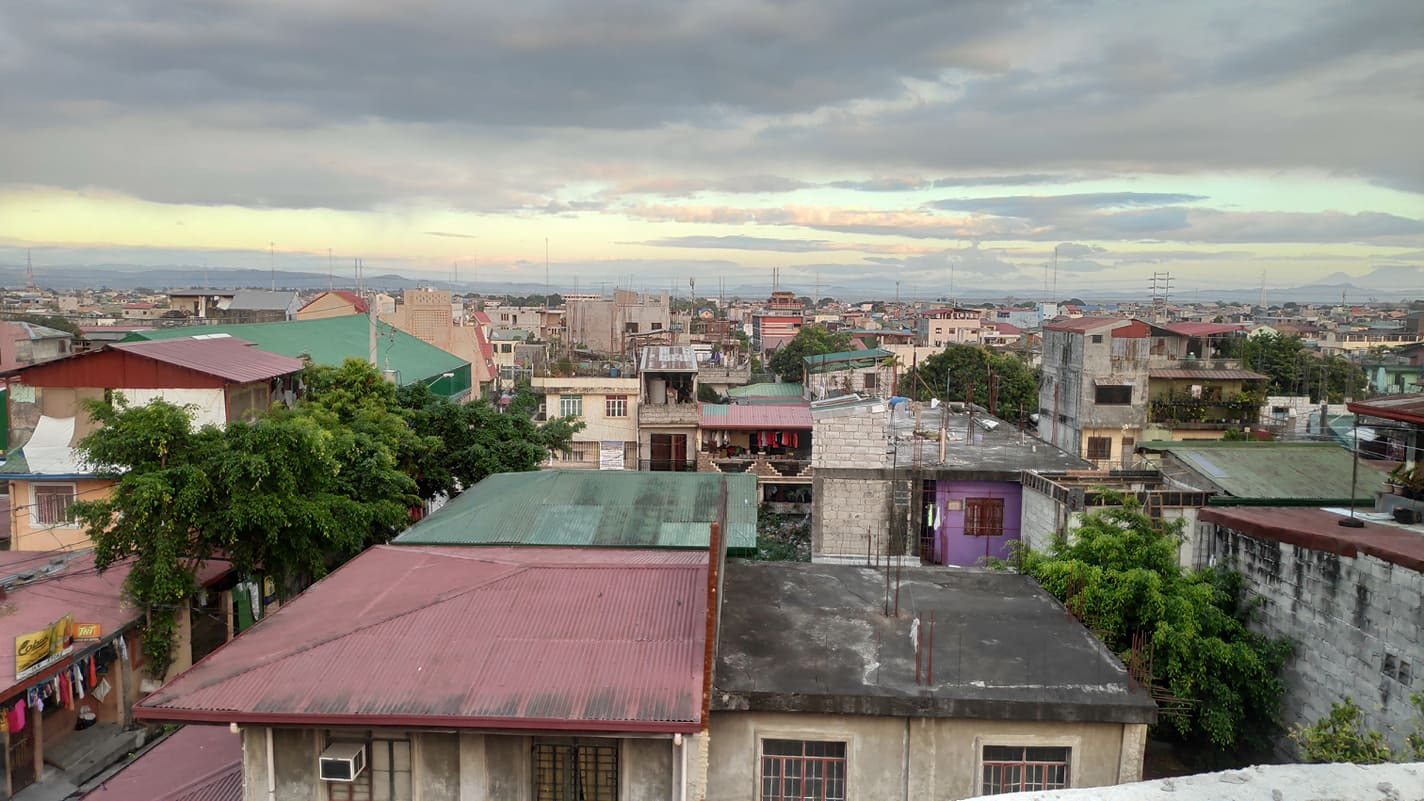
South Signal Village

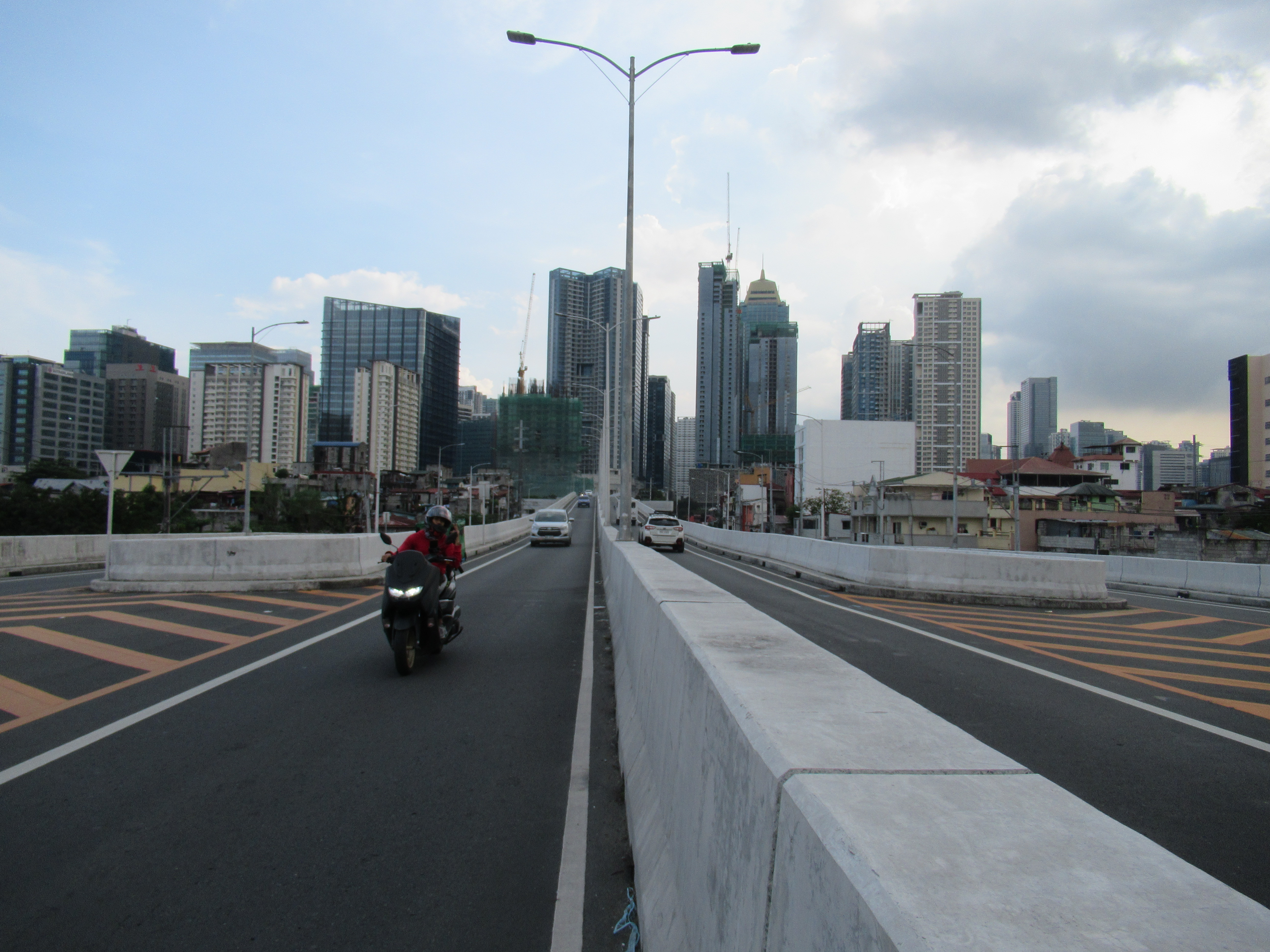
Santa Monica–Lawton Bridge

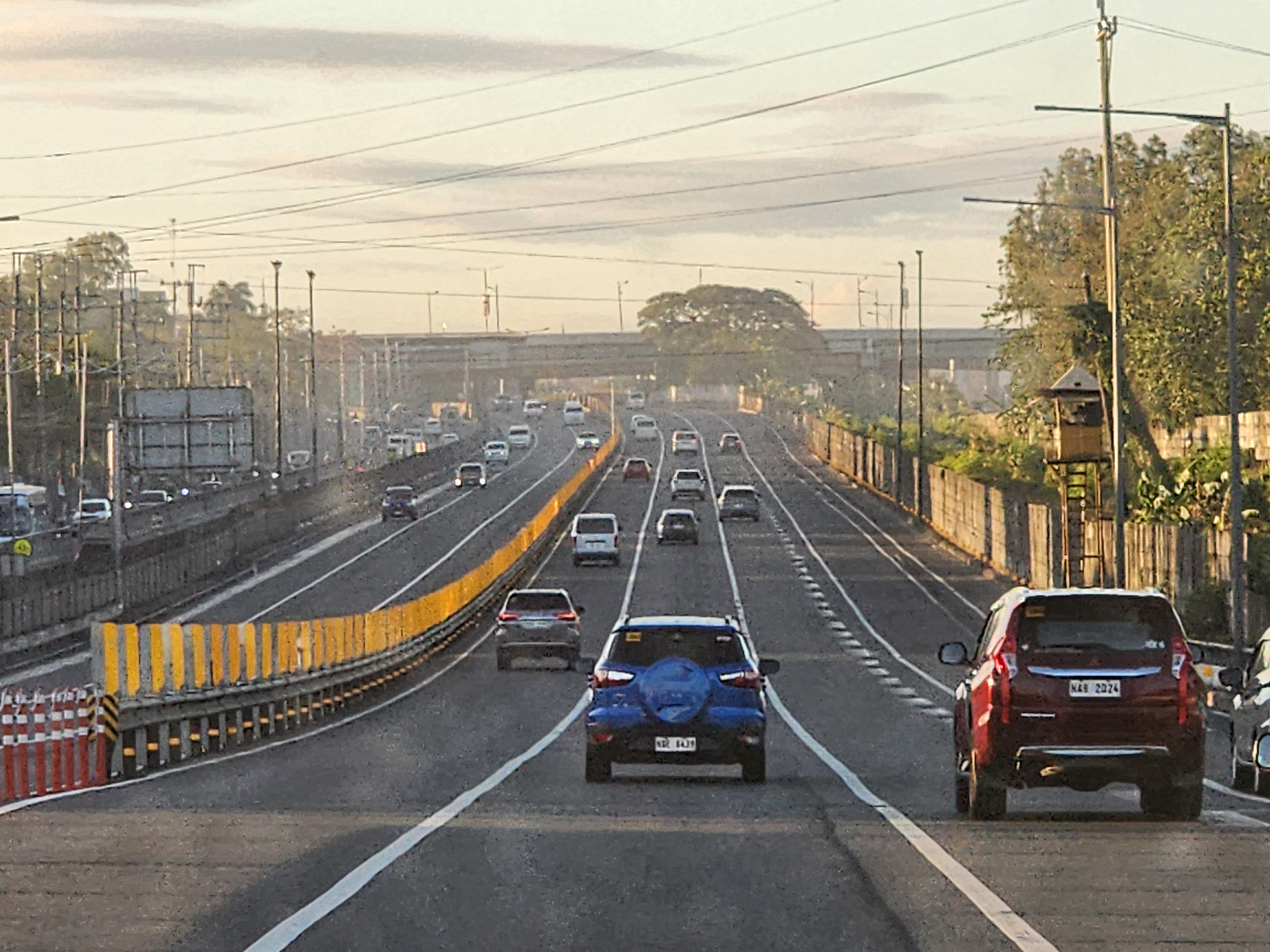
Metro Manila Skyway

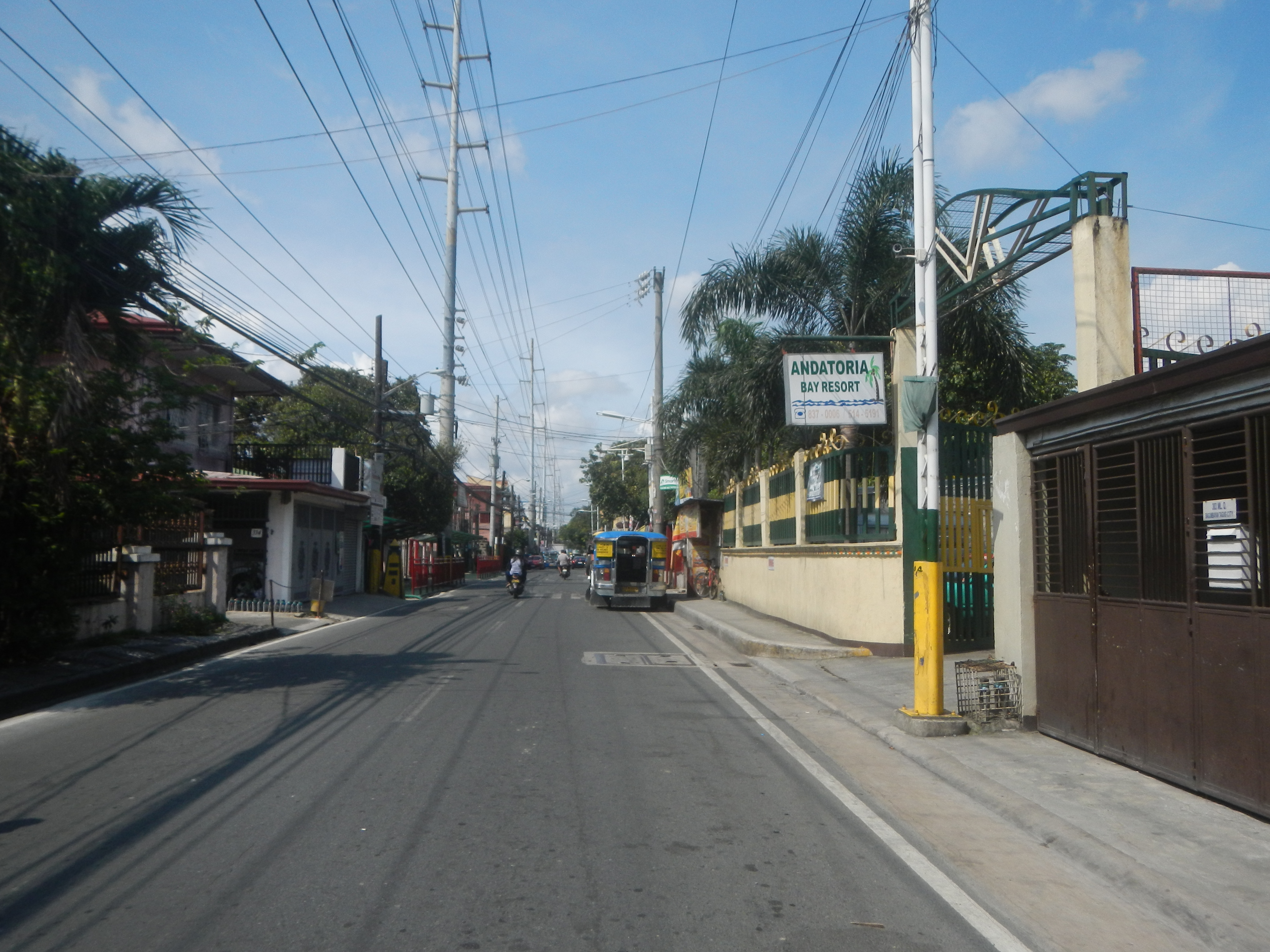
Bagumbayan

== Demographics ==
Population Census of Taguig
Year	Pop.	±% p.a.
1903	6,829	—
1918	8,423	+1.41%
1939	12,087	+1.73%
1948	15,340	+2.68%
1960	21,856	+2.99%
1970	55,257	+9.71%
1975	73,702	+5.95%
1980	134,137	+12.72%
1990	266,637	+7.11%
1995	381,350	+6.93%
2000	467,375	+4.46%
2007	613,343	+3.82%
2010	644,473	+1.82%
2015	804,915	+4.32%
2020	886,722	+2.06%
2024	1,308,085	+9.78%
Source: Philippine Statistics Authority

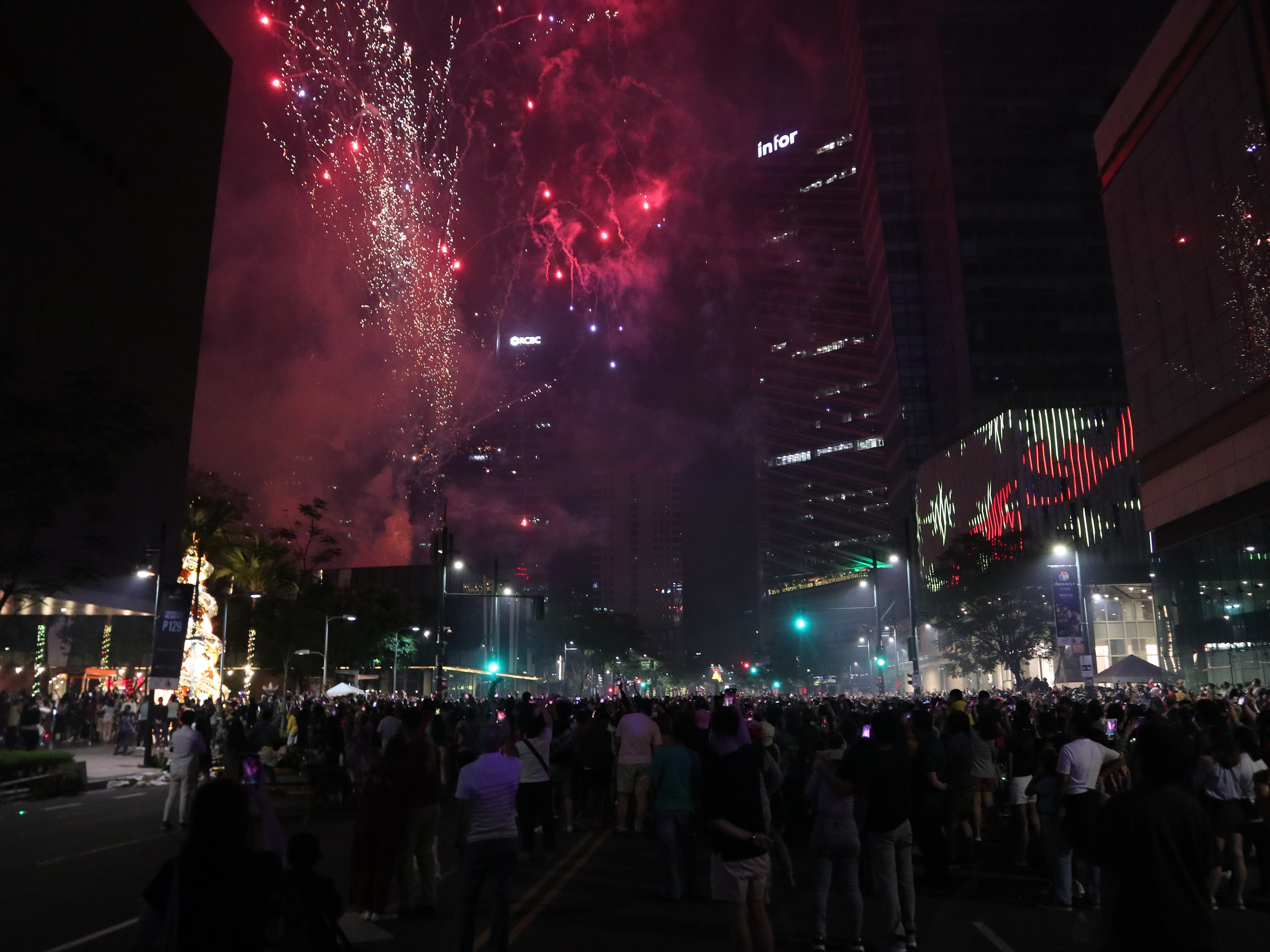
New Year's Eve celebration in Bonifacio High Street in 2021

According to the 2024 census, the population of the Taguig was 1,308,085, making it the fifth most populous city in the Philippines, and the fourth most populous city in Luzon. Its population is made up of 443,918 males (50.3%) and 438,704 females (49.7%). 595,558 of its total population belongs to the age group of 15–64 years old, the largest among the age population groups. It was followed by 0–14 years old with 256,771, and the 65 years and above with 30,293. The three most populous barangays in the city are Western Bicutan (89,897), Post Proper Southside (68,388), and Lower Bicutan (65,652). As of 2022, Taguig has an employment rate of 94%.

As of 2020, Taguig has 246,873 households, with an average household size of 3.6. There are 12,890 recorded live births in 2023, which accounts for 7.9% of all live births in Metro Manila. Out of the 12,890 registered live births, 53.2% were males while 46.8% were females. The city also recorded 1,693 marriages in 2024, which accounts for 3.5% of the total marriages in Metro Manila. Furthermore, the city recorded 5,988 deaths in 2024, which accounts for 7.1% of the total deaths in the capital region.

Based on the 2007 census, there were 44,332 migrants in Taguig, and most of these families settled in vast tracts of undeveloped lands that were not commonly found in other cities of Metro Manila. These led to a high population growth rate per annum between 2000 and 2007, which was largely attributed to uncontrolled migration. Following the 2022 Supreme Court ruling regarding the Makati–Taguig territorial dispute, the city gained ten additional barangays from Makati, further increasing its population to more than 1.3 million, making it the fifth most populous city in the Philippines, surpassing Zamboanga City and Cebu City.

=== Demonym ===
Residents of Taguig are called "Taguigeño" or "Taguigeña". Citizens of the Philippines are called "Filipino", females are called "Filipina". The gender neutral term "Filipinx" is an exonym and is not frequently used in the Philippines.

=== Language ===
Filipino and English are the Philippine official languages. Filipino, a standardized version of Tagalog, is spoken primarily in Metro Manila.

=== Religion ===
Majority of the city's residents are Roman Catholics. All Roman Catholic churches in the city are under the jurisdiction of the Roman Catholic Diocese of Pasig, with the exception of the five parishes of the Embo barangays, which are under the Roman Catholic Archdiocese of Manila due to having been previously under the civil jurisdiction of Makati. Catholicism in the military and police areas of the city is under the jurisdiction of the Military Ordinariate of the Philippines. The headquarters of Victory, an Evangelical Christian church, is located in Bonifacio Global City. The city is notable for being the birthplace of Felix Manalo, the founder of Iglesia ni Cristo. Maharlika Village is known for having the largest Muslim population in Metro Manila and is the home of the Blue Mosque, one of Metro Manila's most prominent Islamic sites; it is one of oldest mosques in the region, and regularly hosts local and non-Filipino Muslims for worship.

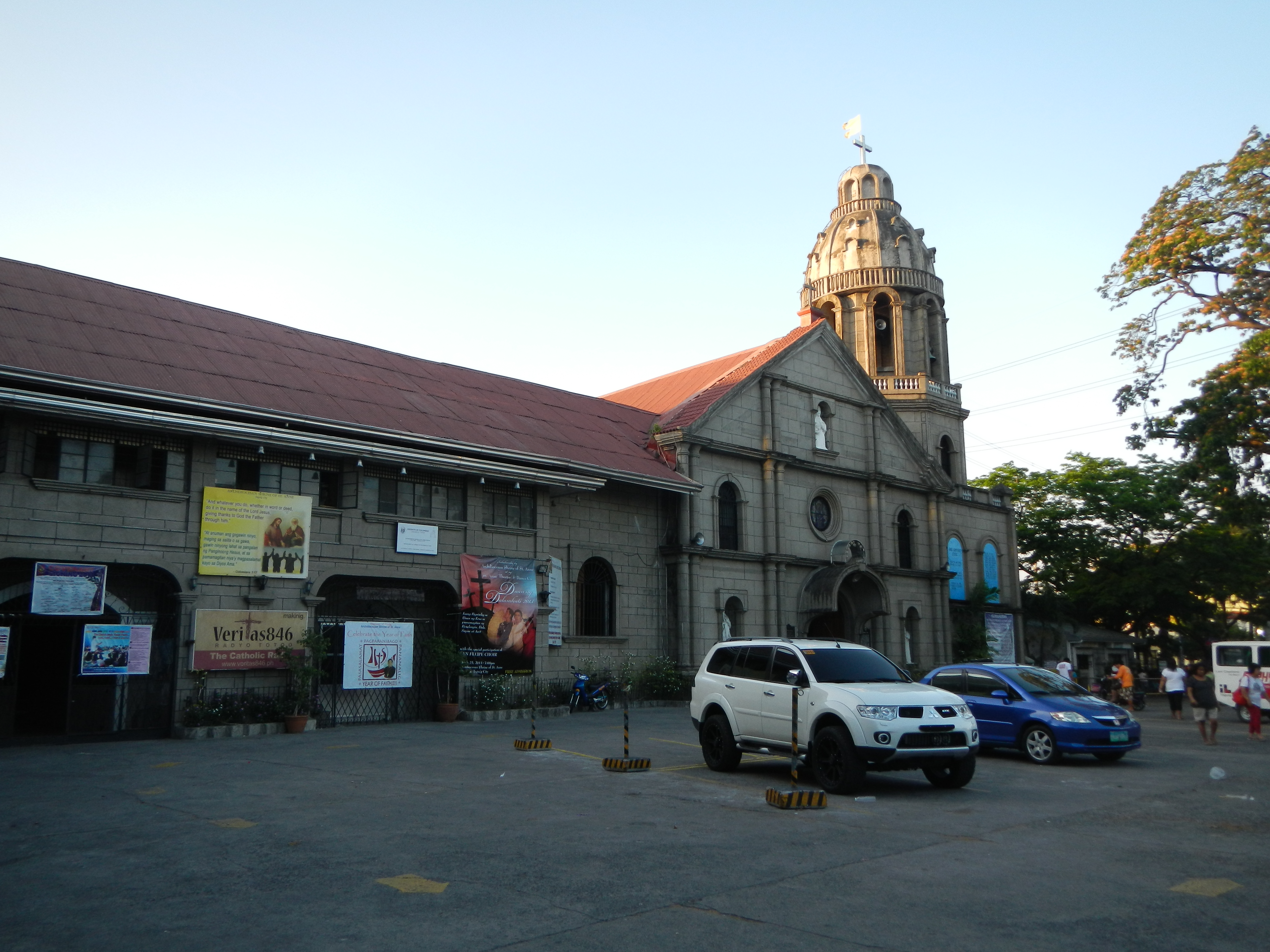
Taguig Church is a minor basilica and a declared historic site and cultural property

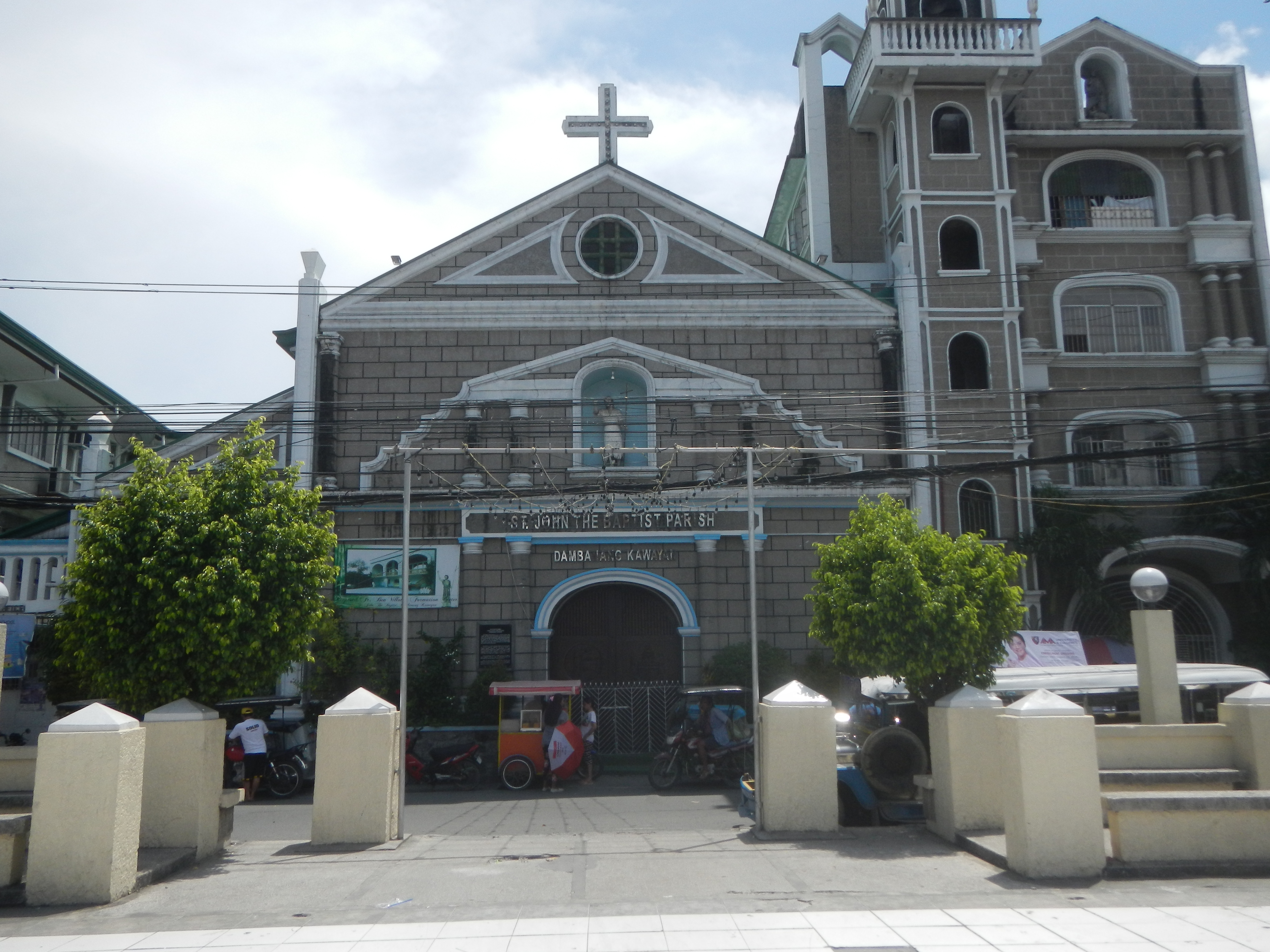
The Saint John the Baptist Parish Church, also known as the Dambanang Kawayan

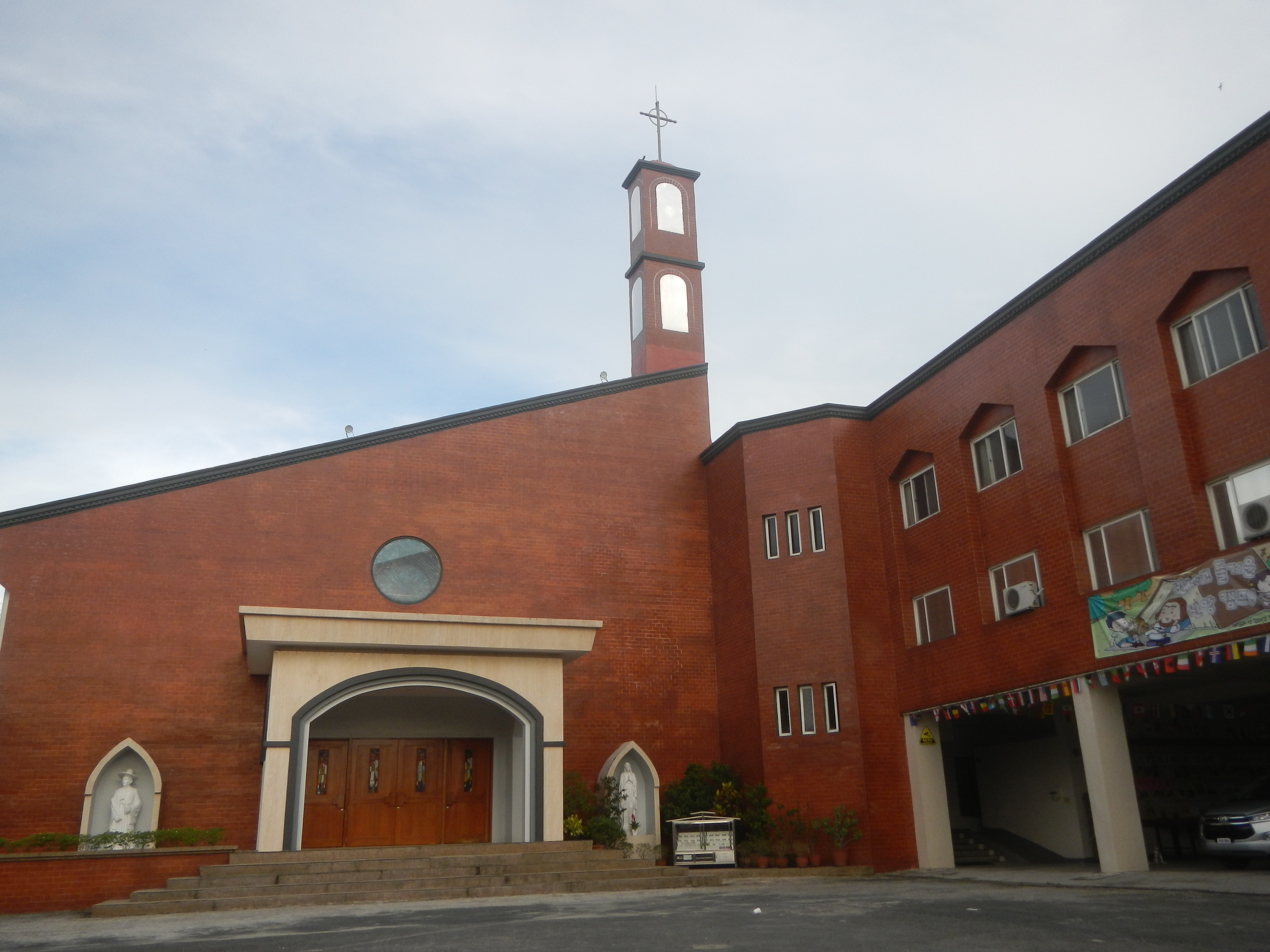
Saint Kim Dae Gun Personal Parish Church serves the Filipino-Korean community

Victory Church Central Office and Victory BGC Congregation

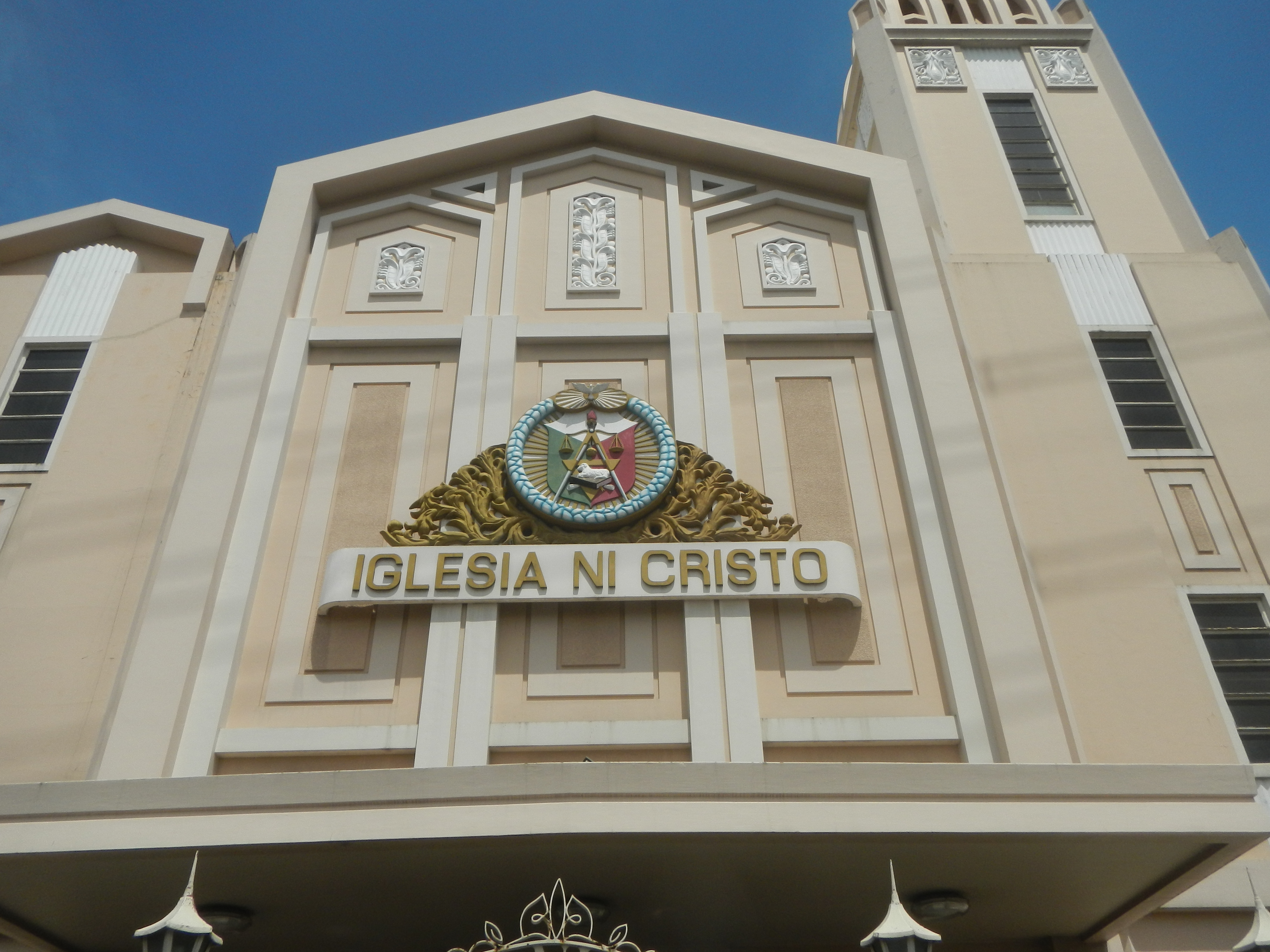
Iglesia Ni Cristo (INC) – Tipas Locale

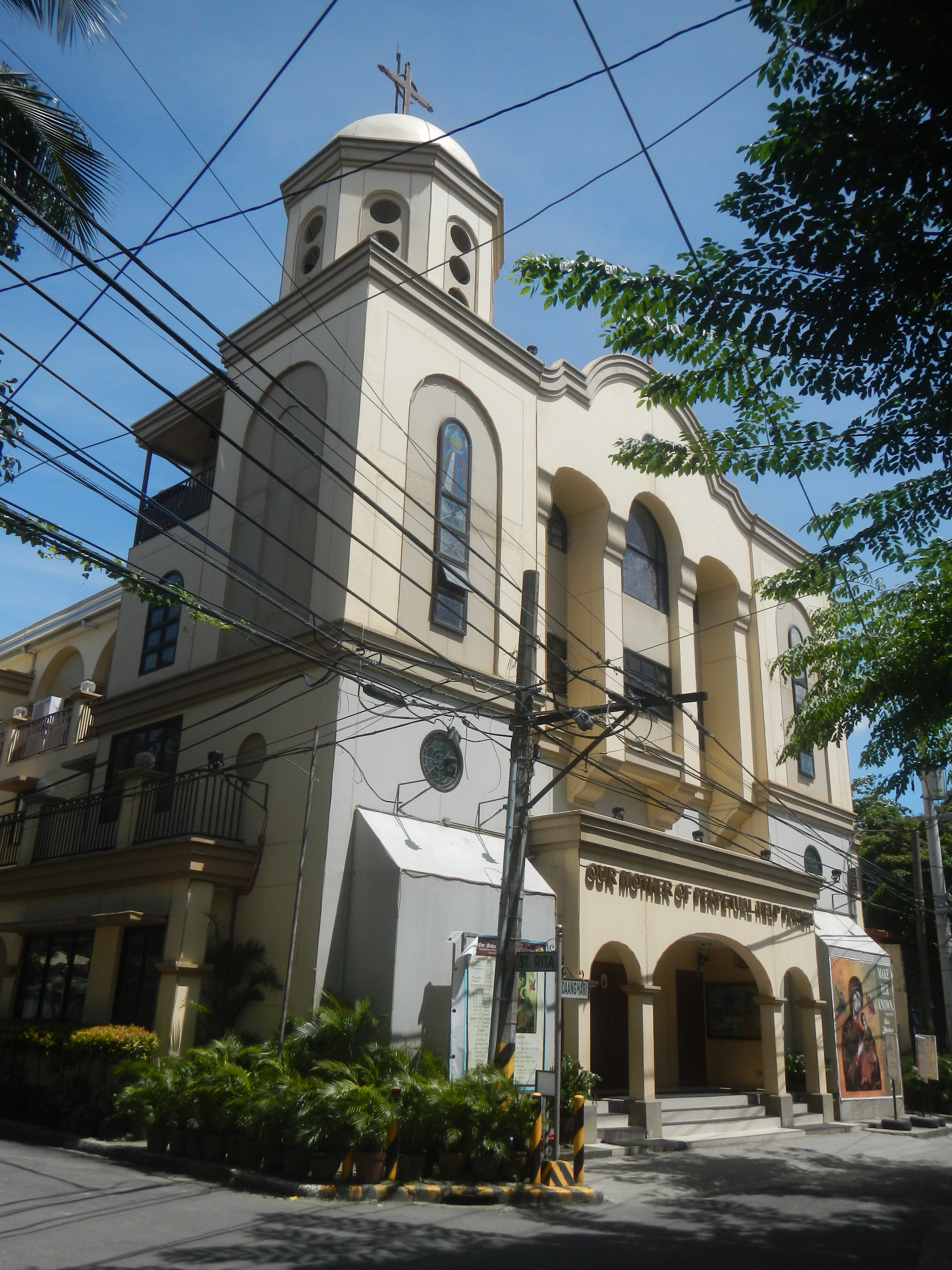
Our Mother of Perpetual Help Parish in Tanyag

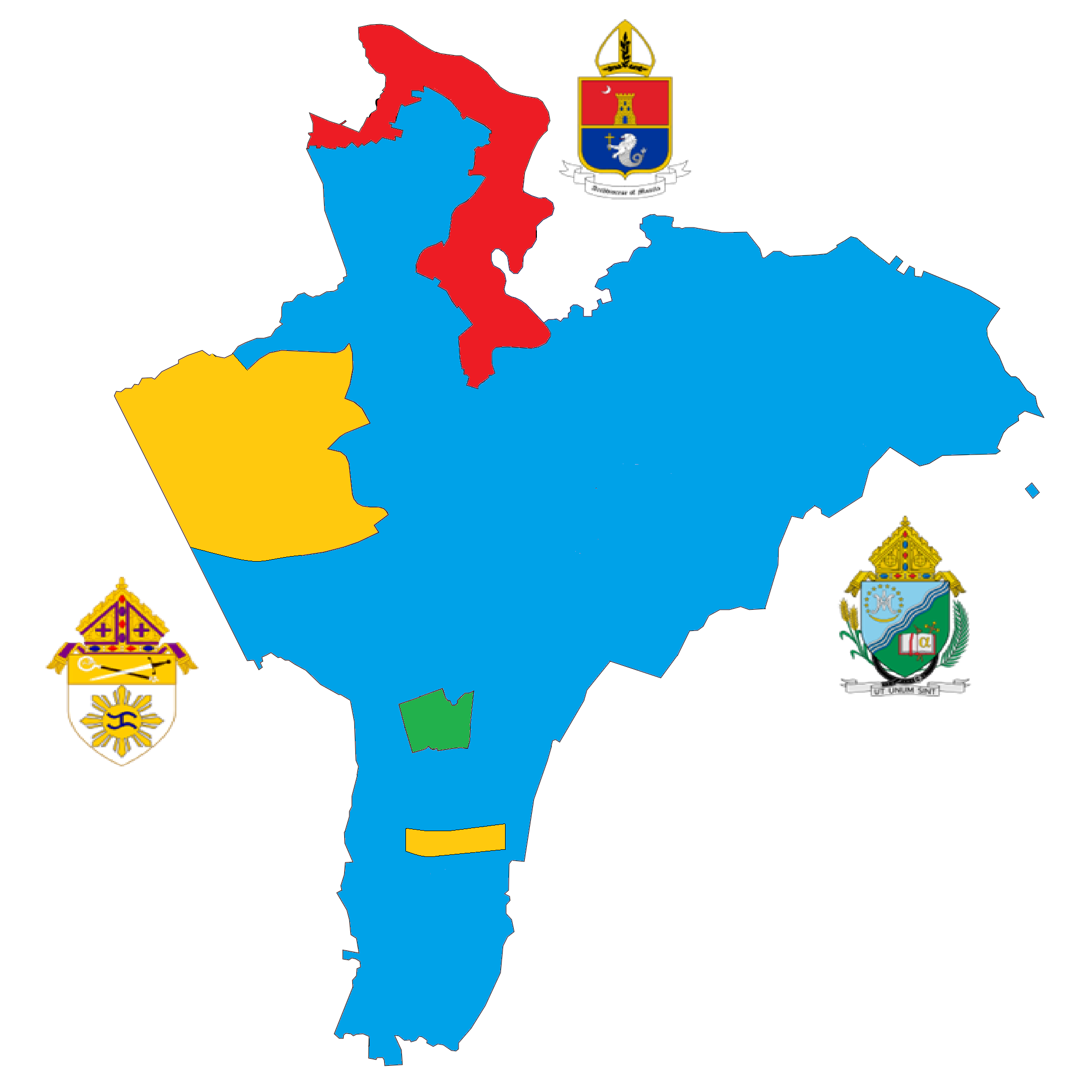
Roman Catholic Church Dioceses within the City of Taguig

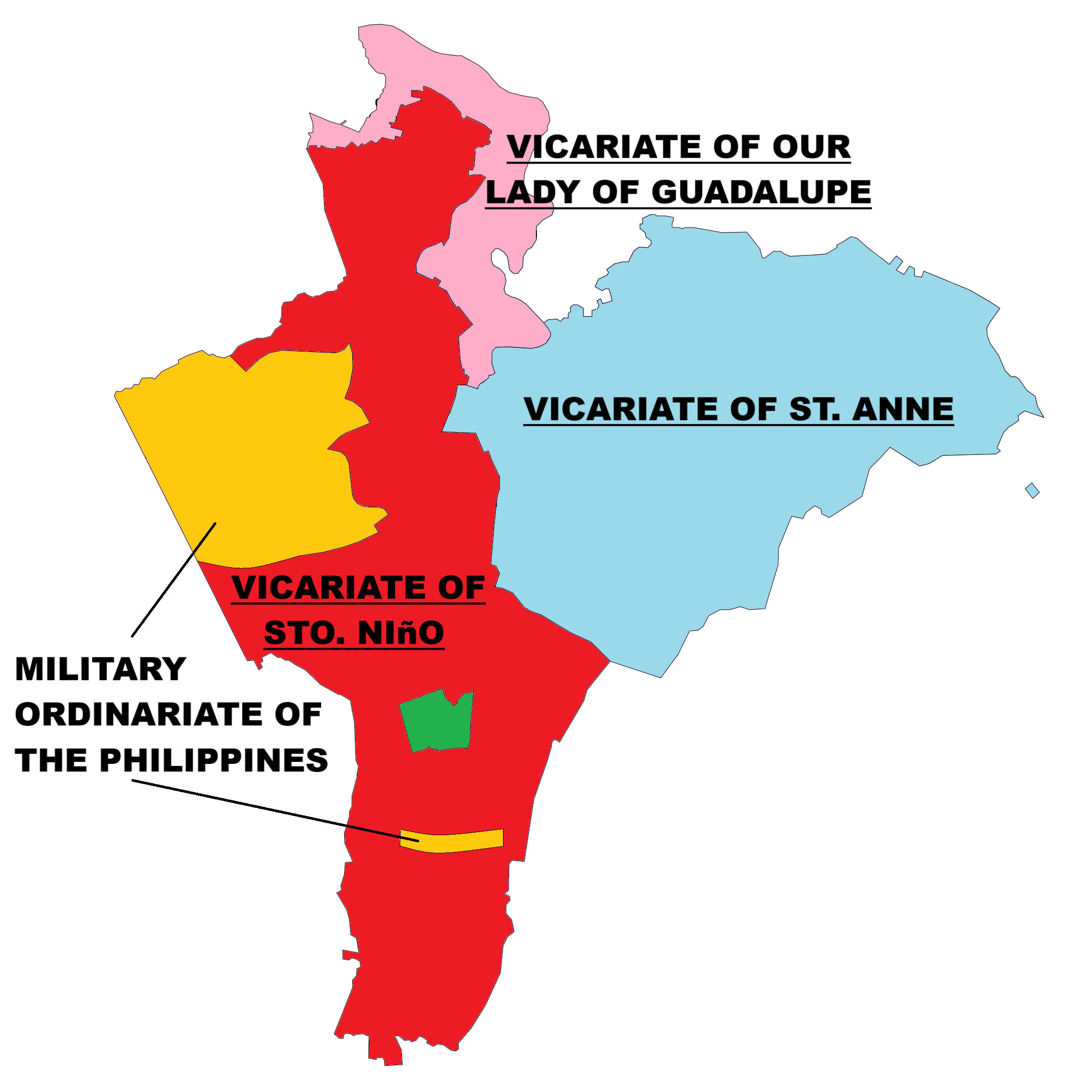
Roman Catholic Church Vicariates within the City of Taguig

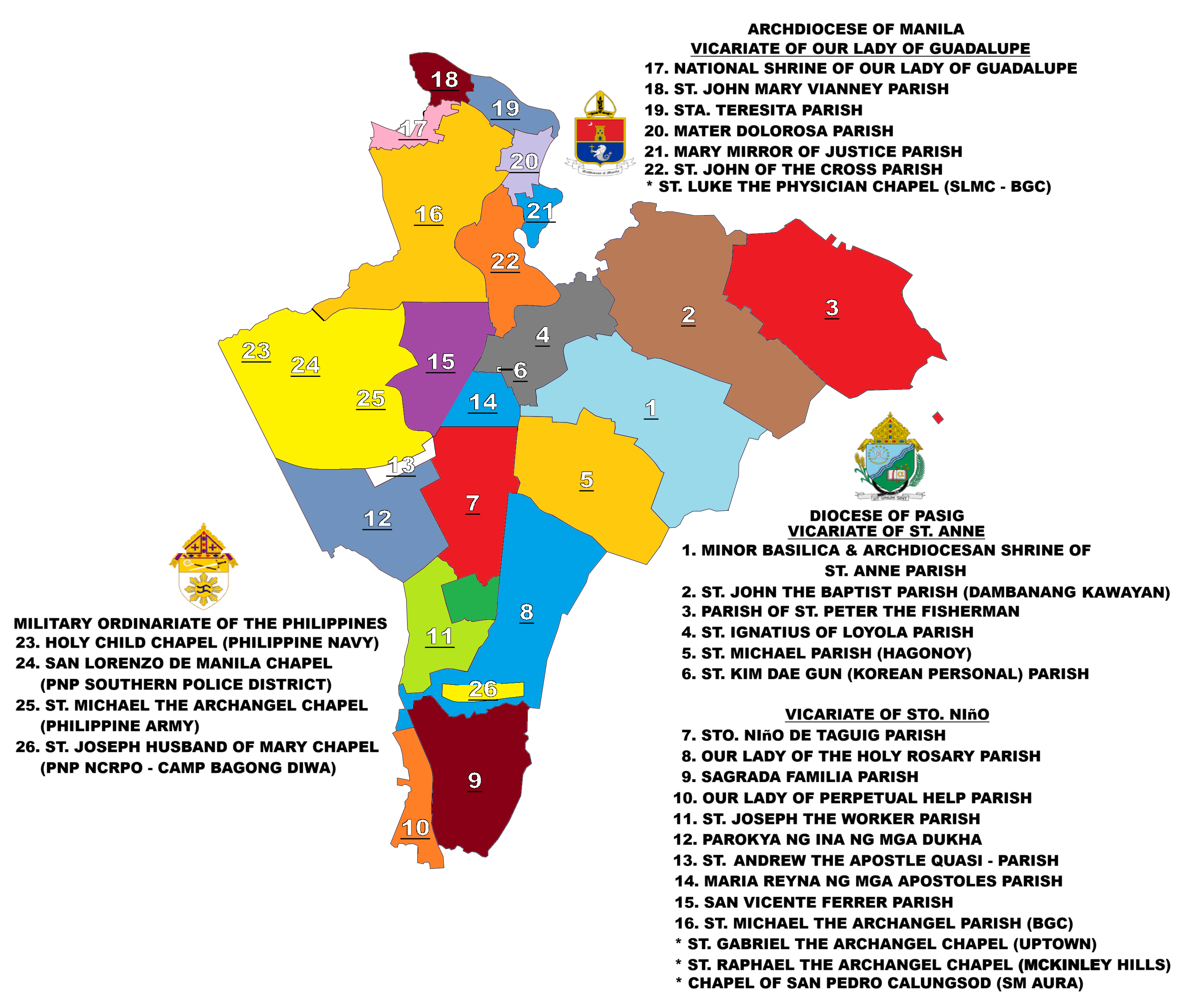
Roman Catholic Church Parishes within the City of Taguig

=== Poverty, housing and urban slums ===
Poverty incidence of Taguig (%)

Source: Philippine Statistics Authority

In 2007, Taguig was ranked the poorest in Metro Manila, with 5.2 percent of its population, considered poor. Of the 689,377 informal settler families living in Metro Manila, 20,718 were reported to be living in Taguig. Of these: 4,778 of these families lives along danger areas, along the lake shoreline, creeks, and rivers; 13,248 occupy government-owned lands; 718 occupy privately owned lands; and 1,974 families are in Areas of Priority Development. The poor, who mostly live in informal settlements are the most prone to natural hazards. In 2000, there are about 21,931 households in informal settlements or about 33.7% of the total household of Taguig.

The Taguig City Urban Poor Affairs Office (UPAO) is in-charge of the city's poverty-alleviation program. In order to address the poverty in Taguig, the city government launched the Lifeline Assistance for Neighbors In-need Care and Support (LANI CARES) social program in June 2024, which grants financial, food and non-food assistance. The program is meant to augment existing social programs such as the national government DSWD programs such as the Assistance to Individuals in Crisis Situation (AICS) and Tulong Panghanapbuhay sa Ating Disadvantaged Workers (TUPAD).

==== Housing ====
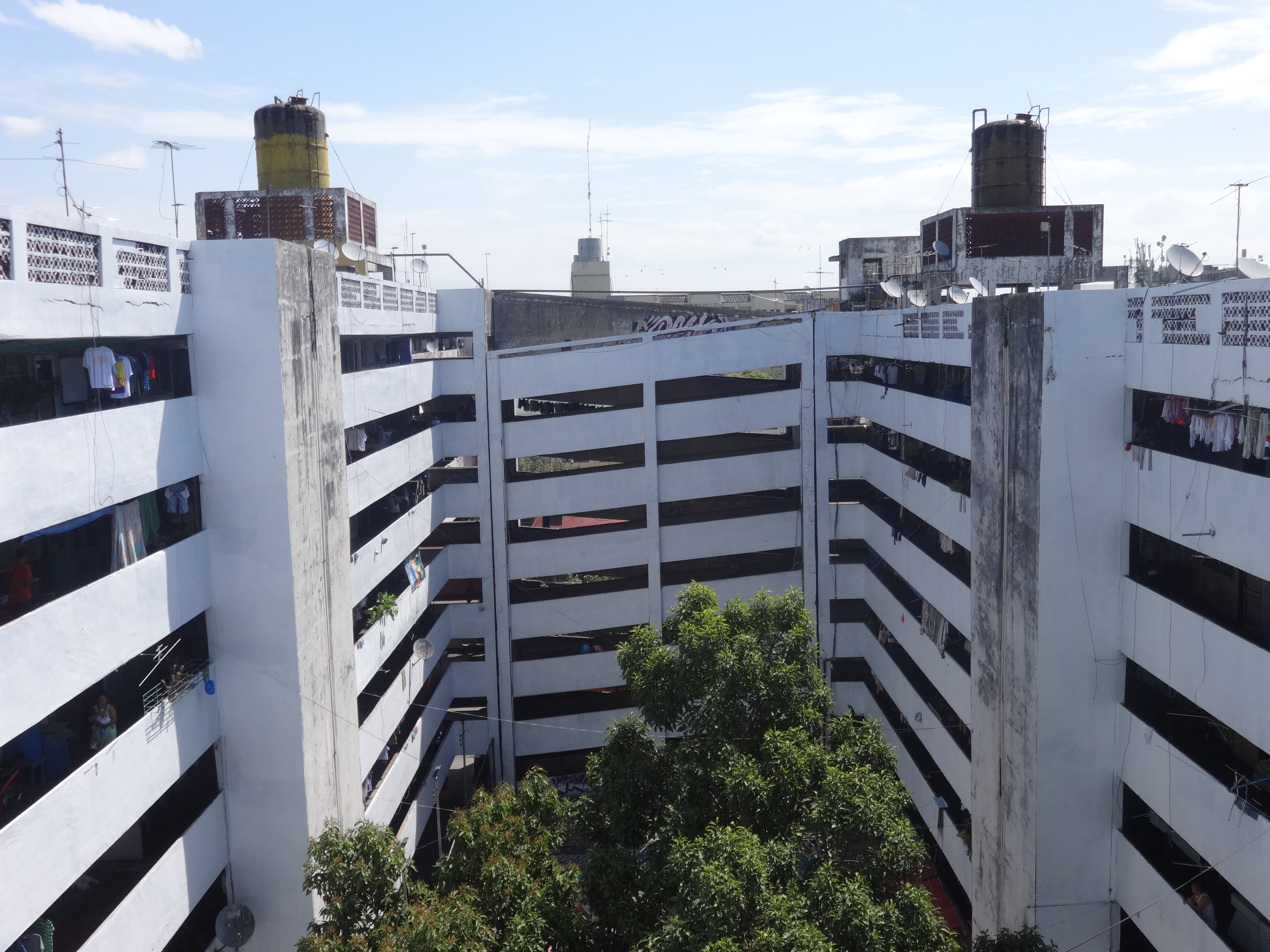
The central courtyard of the Fort Bonifacio Tenement

The City Government of Taguig has undertaken socialized housing projects such as the Family Townhomes, which won the 2009 Galing Pook Awards. The Fort Bonifacio Tenement, constructed in 1963, is known for its basketball culture and its central courtyard basketball court often serves as a medium for murals and exhibitions.

The Bases Conversion and Development Authority (BCDA) has built several housing projects such as the Pamayanang Diego Silang (Diego Silang Community) in Ususan, whose main beneficiaries were the Philippine National Police (PNP) personnel who maintains a clean service record. BCDA and the City Government of Taguig signed an agreement that declares two properties of the BCDA within Fort Bonifacio to be used for socialized housing, as identified by the National Housing Authority (NHA).

== Economy ==
The Metrobank Center is the tallest building in the Philippines, standing at 318 m (1,043 ft)

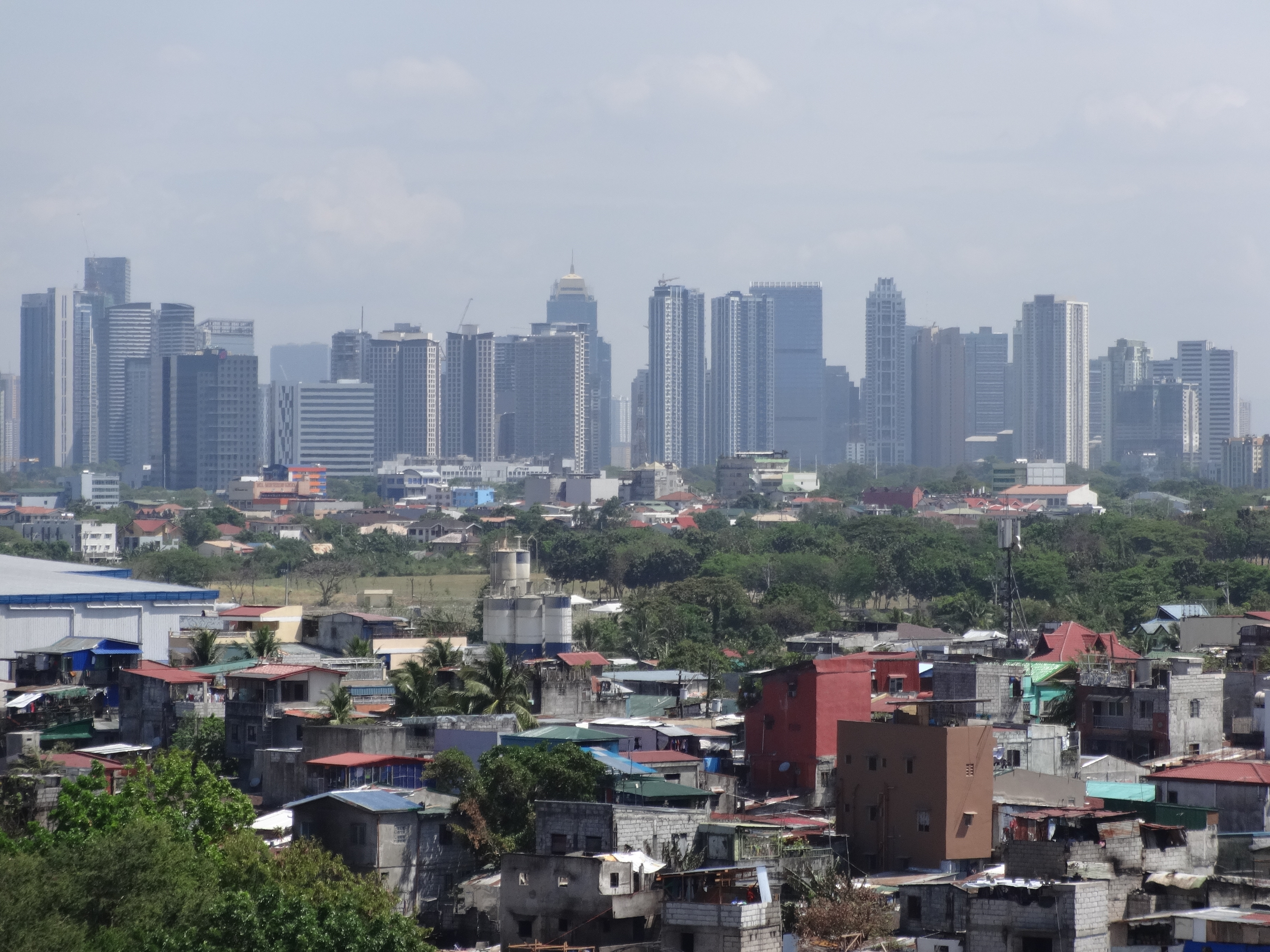
Skyline of Bonifacio Global City, the central business district of Taguig.

The Philippine Stock Exchange headquarters in One Bonifacio High Street

Taguig is a national hub of business and commerce. The city is a center for banking and finance, health care and life sciences, medical technology and research, retailing, trade, tourism, real estate, new media, traditional media, advertising, legal services, accountancy, insurance, and the arts. Bonifacio Global City is the central business district of Taguig and is one of the five major central business districts (CBDs) of Metro Manila, as the other four being the Makati CBD, Ortigas Center, Bay City, and Binondo. In 2024, Taguig is the 8th largest economy in the Philippines, with a 2.95% share to the national gross domestic product totaling ₱656.31 billion.

Taguig has a GDP of ₱566.19 billion and is the 4th largest economy of the National Capital Region, accounting for 8.6% of the region's total economy as of 2023. The city has the sixth-highest per capita GDP among highly urbanized cities in the country at ₱524,835 (US$9,800) as of 2023.

The city is continuously improving its ease of doing business; aside from lower taxes, the city is simplifying its business registration process. According to the Cities and Municipalities Index (CMCI) of the Department of Trade and Industry, the city ranks as the 10th Most Competitive Highly-Urbanized City in the Philippines in 2024. The CMCI ranks cities and municipalities in the country according to five pillars: economic dynamism, government efficiency, infrastructure, resiliency, and innovation.

The office market in Metro Manila is dominated by three major cities with CBDs: Makati, Taguig, and Pasig. The city has an office space supply of 2.7 million square meters (29 million square feet) as of end-2021, behind Makati's 2.8 million square meters (30 million square feet). As of 2021, the registered number of total employment in the city was 212,818. As of 2023, Taguig had the highest share of existing office supply in Metro Manila at 26 percent, followed by Makati at 20 percent.

=== Agriculture ===
The Taguig City Agricultural Office is responsible for the planning and implementation of agricultural programs and policies. The office has set up several urban farms in various places within the city including one in Bonifacio Global City, and its urban farming programs were lauded by the national government. The Taguig City Government, in partnership with the Department of Agriculture and the Laguna Lake Development Authority (LLDA), is planning to setup the first agri-industrial corridor dedicated to freshwater aquaculture and urban farming.

Aquaculture and fishing still exist in the city's coastal communities located along Laguna de Bay. The Department of Agriculture also plans to construct an aquaculture facility in the city which will have 80 floating cages, an agro-waste processing and treatment plant, a fishport with cold storage facility, and a fish market.

The Santa Ana Bukid is a 113-hectare (280-acre) melon farm located in Barangay Wawa. It can harvest up to 30,000 kilograms (66,000 lb) of the fruit per hectare, with different varieties such as honeydew and cantaloupe. Taguig also celebrates its annual "Melon Festival" near Laguna Lake Highway.

=== Industrial sector ===
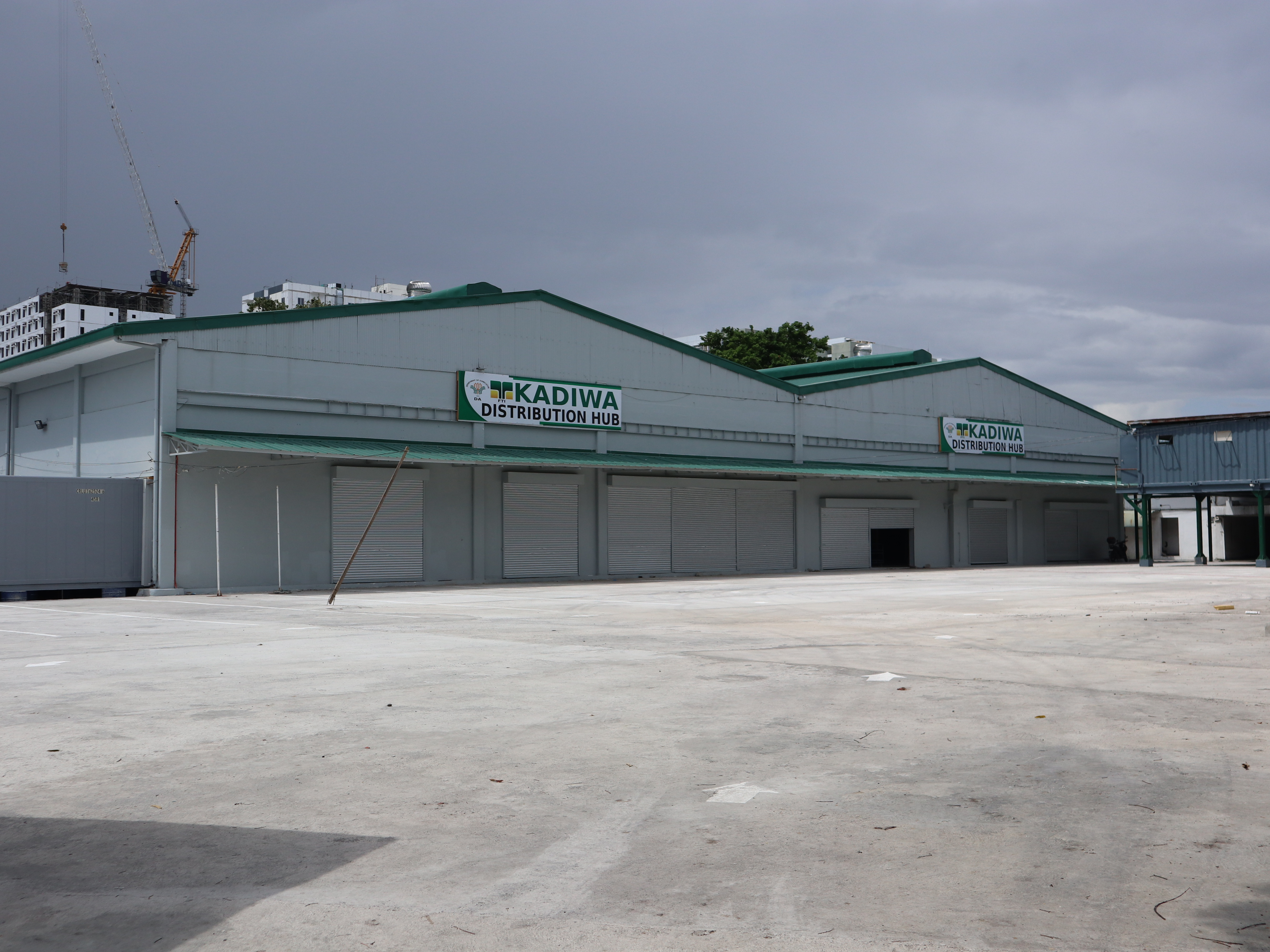
FTI Kadiwa Distribution Hub in Western Bicutan

The industrial sector made up 10.9% of the Taguig's total economy. The city has several industrial areas, most of which are located in barangays Ibayo-Tipas, Palingon, Calzada, Napindan, Western Bicutan, Bagumbayan, and Tanyag. The Food Terminal Inc. (FTI) in Western Bicutan is a national government-owned agro-industrial hub. Historically, it has been involved in food trading, processing and storage until 1989. At present, FTI engage into medium to long-term leases, regardless of the nature of business. However, it still actively promotes the food sector and maintains facilities that supports the food industry. Mañalac Industrial Estate, located in Bagumbayan, is another industrial hub based in southern Taguig, while Tipas also host some industrial sites that spilled over along its border with Kalawaan, Pasig's southern industrial hub.

=== Tourism ===
The Mind Museum, a science museum in Bonifacio Global City.

Venice Grand Canal Mall

Mitsukoshi BGC is one of the city's many posh malls.

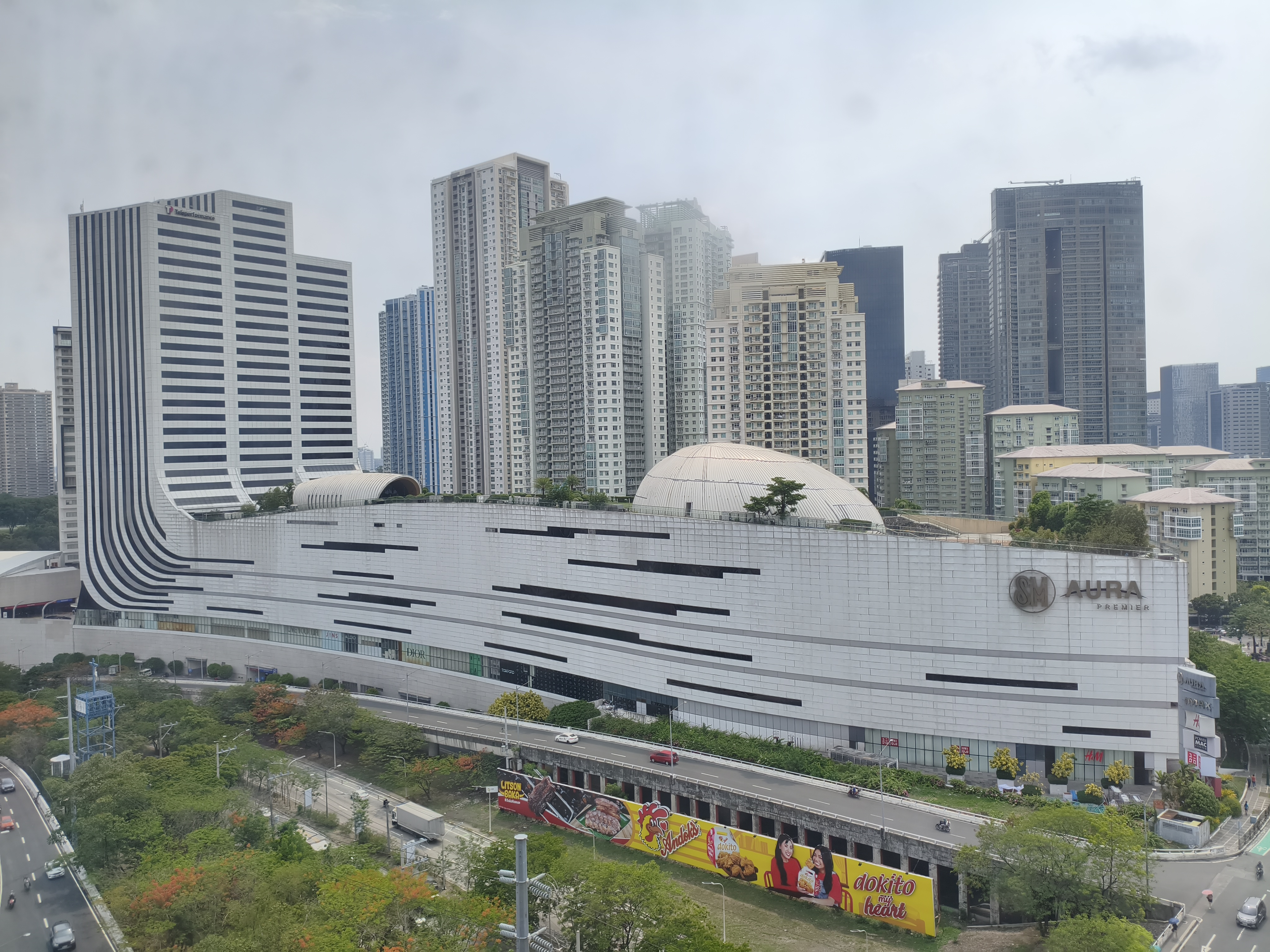
SM Aura

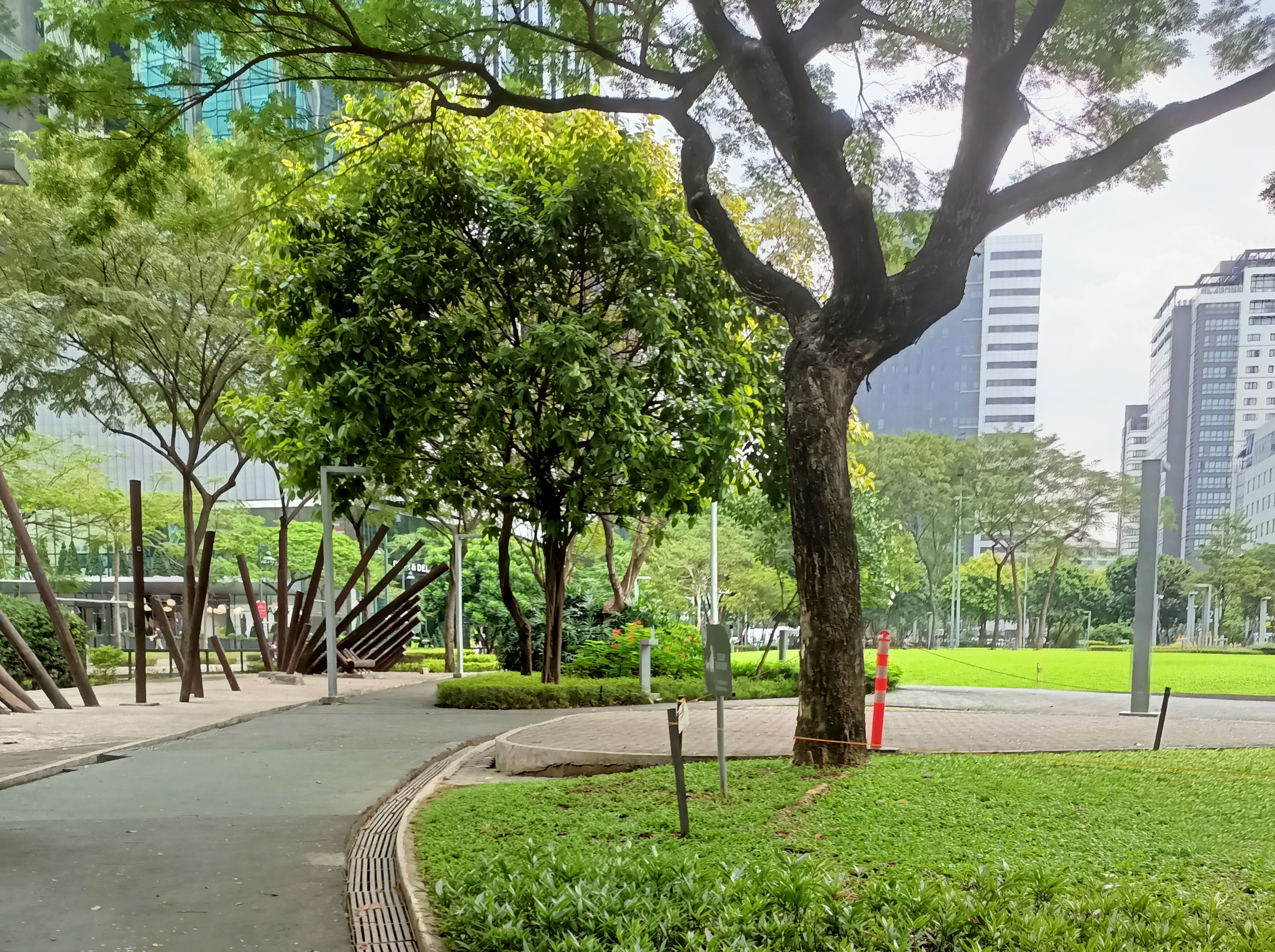
Track 30th in Bonifacio Global City

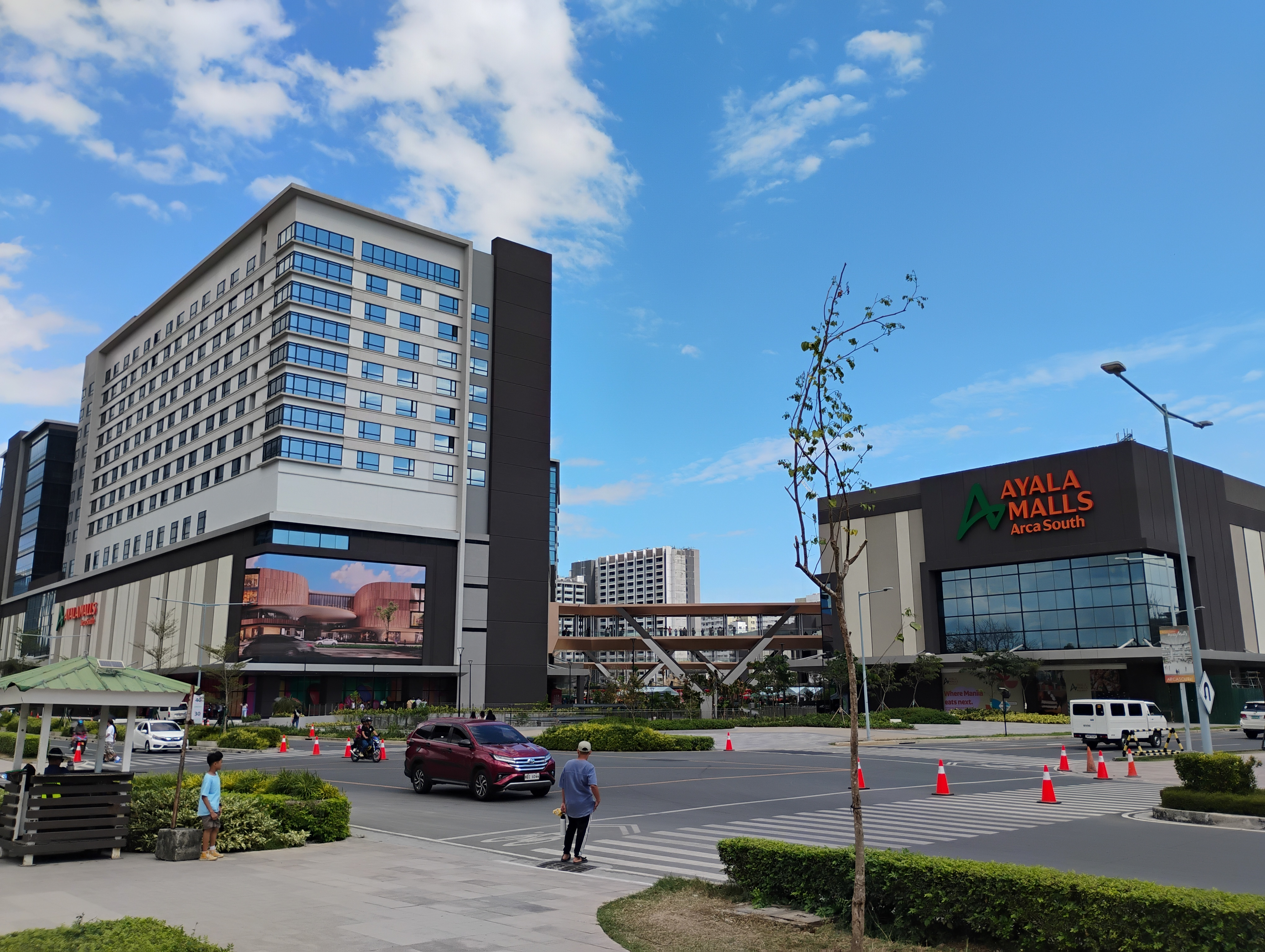
Ayala Malls Arca South

Tourism is a vital industry for Taguig. The city and the Metro Manila area as a whole have an array of attractions for tourists, including monuments, memorials, museums, sports events, and shopping malls. Accommodation and food service activities was the city's second fastest growing industry in 2023. The Mind Museum is a science museum with more than 250 exhibits. The Manila American Cemetery, a military cemetery that honors US personnel killed during World War II in the Philippines and other allied nations, is managed and operated by the American Battle Monuments Commission. The Libingan ng mga Bayani (LMB), is the national cemetery of the Philippines. The Philippine Veterans Museum in Western Bicutan features artifacts, documents, photographs and other memorabilia about the accounts of Filipino veterans during World War II. The city government owned TLC Park along C6 Road in Lower Bicutan is home to lightshows, concerts, and other activities during holiday seasons like Christmas and Valentines.

Taguig is a major shopping destination where shopping malls, department stores, markets, supermarkets, and bazaars are located, catering mostly to the middle and high-end class. Numerous high-end malls can be found in or near Bonifacio Global City such as the mixed-use Bonifacio High Street, Mitsukoshi BGC, SM Aura, Uptown Mall, Venice Grand Canal Mall in McKinley Hill, and Ayala Malls Park Triangle. Shopping malls that cater to the middle-class market include Market! Market!, Gate 3 Plaza, Vista Mall Taguig, and Ayala Malls Arca South.

The city boasts numerous public parks and plazas such as the TLC Park in Lower Bicutan, which contains the Mercado del Lago, and the Taguig People's Park in West Rembo, formerly known as the Makati Park and Garden when it was still administered by Makati. Other parks in the city include the Taguig Eco Park in Pinagsama, Employee's Park in Tuktukan, San Miguel Calisthenics Park in San Miguel, Friendship Park in North Signal Village, Maharlika Park in Maharlika Village, Central Signal Calisthenics Park in Central Signal Village, and the Taguig Community Center which contains the Joseph Sitt Park in Bagumbayan. Bonifacio Global City also features numerous parks such as Track 30th, Terra 28th, the Bonifacio High Street Central Park, High Street South Park, Burgos Circle, NEO Park, De Jesus Oval, Kasalikasan Garden, Sundial Park, McKinley Parkway, and the BGC Greenway, the longest urban park in Metro Manila at 1.5 kilometers (0.93 mi).

The Napindan Lighthouse is a historic lighthouse that served as a meeting point for Katipunan, a revolutionary group that led the Philippine Independence movement.

== Government and politics ==
=== City government ===
Taguig City Hall in Ususan is the city's seat of government

Taguig is classified as a highly urbanized city (HUC).

The Taguig City Hall, located in Barangay Tuktukan, serves as the seat of the city government. Constructed in 1959, it underwent three renovations. It also maintains a satellite office at SM Aura Tower. A new 17-storey city hall is currently under-construction along Cayetano Boulevard in Barangay Ususan and will replace the current city hall.

The Mayor of Taguig is Lani Cayetano. Arvin Alit, a former councilor, is the city's incumbent vice mayor. The mayor and the vice mayor are limited to up-to three terms, each term lasting for three years. They are both restricted to three consecutive terms, totaling nine years, although a mayor can be elected again after an interruption of one term. The vice mayor heads the Taguig City Council consisting of 26 members: 12 councilors from the 1st district, 12 councilors from the 2nd district, the president of the Sangguniang Kabataan (Youth Council) Federation as sectoral representative of the youth, and the president of the Association of Barangay Captains (ABC) as barangay sectoral representative. The council is in charge of creating the city's policies in the form of ordinances and resolutions. The current district representatives of the city are Ricardo "Ading" Cruz Jr. for 1st district and Jorge Daniel Bocobo for 2nd district.

=== National government ===
The New Senate Building being constructed as of 2023

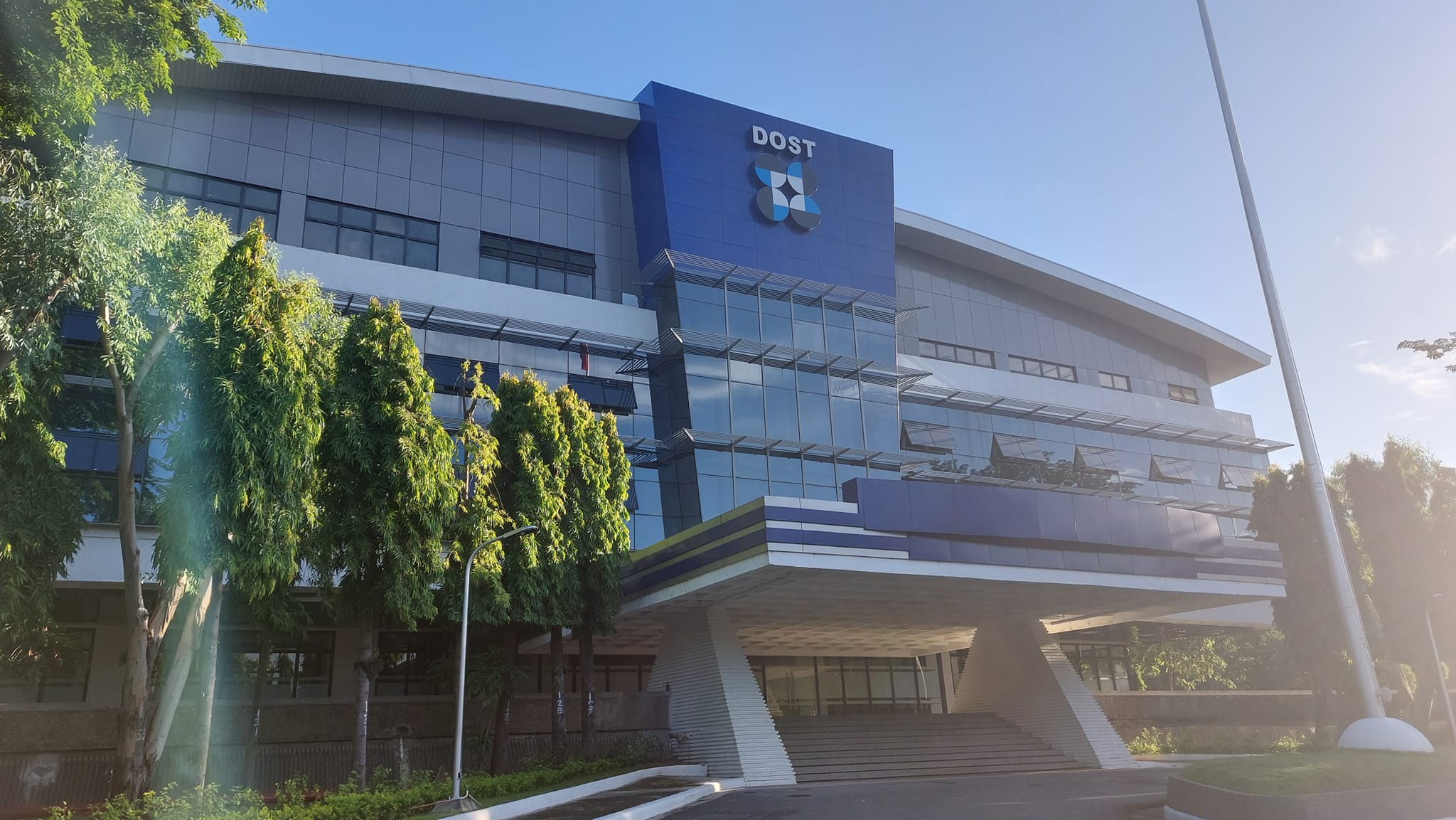
Headquarters of the Department of Science and Technology

As part of the National Capital Region (NCR), the city is the home to numerous national government bodies such as the Senate of the Philippines set to move in at least 2025. A study is also being pushed by the House of Representatives to move their chamber from Quezon City to Taguig within the same complex as the Senate. The Supreme Court of the Philippines also planned to relocate to Taguig from Manila, but chose to move to Bulakan, Bulacan near the future New Manila International Airport instead.

Several national government agencies calls the city home, such as the Departments of Science and Technology, and Energy, as well as the Intellectual Property Office of the Philippines, National Mapping and Resource Information Authority, and the Technical Education and Skills Development Authority. The Department of Education is also planned to be moved to Taguig. Since large tracts of the city's land was reserved for military use since the American colonial period, some of these became the headquarters for the Philippine Army and Philippine Marine Corps. A Philippine Navy Naval Station, as well as a Philippine Coast Guard Base can be found within the city.

Regional government agencies in the city include the National Capital Region Police Office, based in Camp Bagong Diwa, and its Southern Police District, headquartered along Lawton Avenue.

=== Judiciary ===
Taguig has eight branches of the Regional Trial Court (RTC) and four branches of the Metropolitan Trial Court (MeTC), with an average caseload of 471 cases per RTC branches and 618 cases per MeTC branch. A bill has also been passed to create 10 additional branches of the RTC and five additional branches of the MeTC as cases are expected to increase following the reintegration of the Embo barangays in 2023, which also added 336,873 residents to the city.

=== Finance ===
As of 2025, the City of Taguig has an approved budget of ₱23 billion. Based on the 2023 Annual Audit Report of the Commission on Audit, Taguig has a revenue of ₱17.303 billion, with ₱52.803 billion in assets, and has a liability of ₱28.201 billion. It is the fifth wealthiest city in the Philippines, behind Pasig, the capital Manila, Makati, and Quezon City, respectively. Taguig is Metro Manila's third top revenue earner in 2023, with ₱13.54 billion in locally sourced revenues, following Makati at second place with ₱19.36 billion, and Quezon City at first place with ₱27.41 billion.

=== International relations ===
Embassy of the Republic of Korea in McKinley Hill

As part of the National Capital Region, several foreign countries have their embassies within Taguig. Many are concentrated within the Fort Bonifacio area. The International Finance Corporation (IFC) in the Philippines is headquartered in city, as well as the Resident Mission of the World Bank. There are also several international schools maintaining their presence within the city. These are the British School Manila, International School Manila, Korean International School Philippines, Leaders International Christian School of Manila, and the Manila Japanese School.

List of countries with their embassies in Taguig:

1. Angola
2. Austria
3. Colombia
4. Denmark
5. Finland
6. Hungary
7. Israel (article)
8. Italy
9. Kuwait
10. Laos
11. Morocco
12. Norway
13. Oman
14. Panama
15. Poland
16. Singapore (article)
17. South Korea
18. Sweden
19. United Arab Emirates
20. United Kingdom (article)

== Infrastructure ==
=== Transportation ===
==== Streets and highways ====
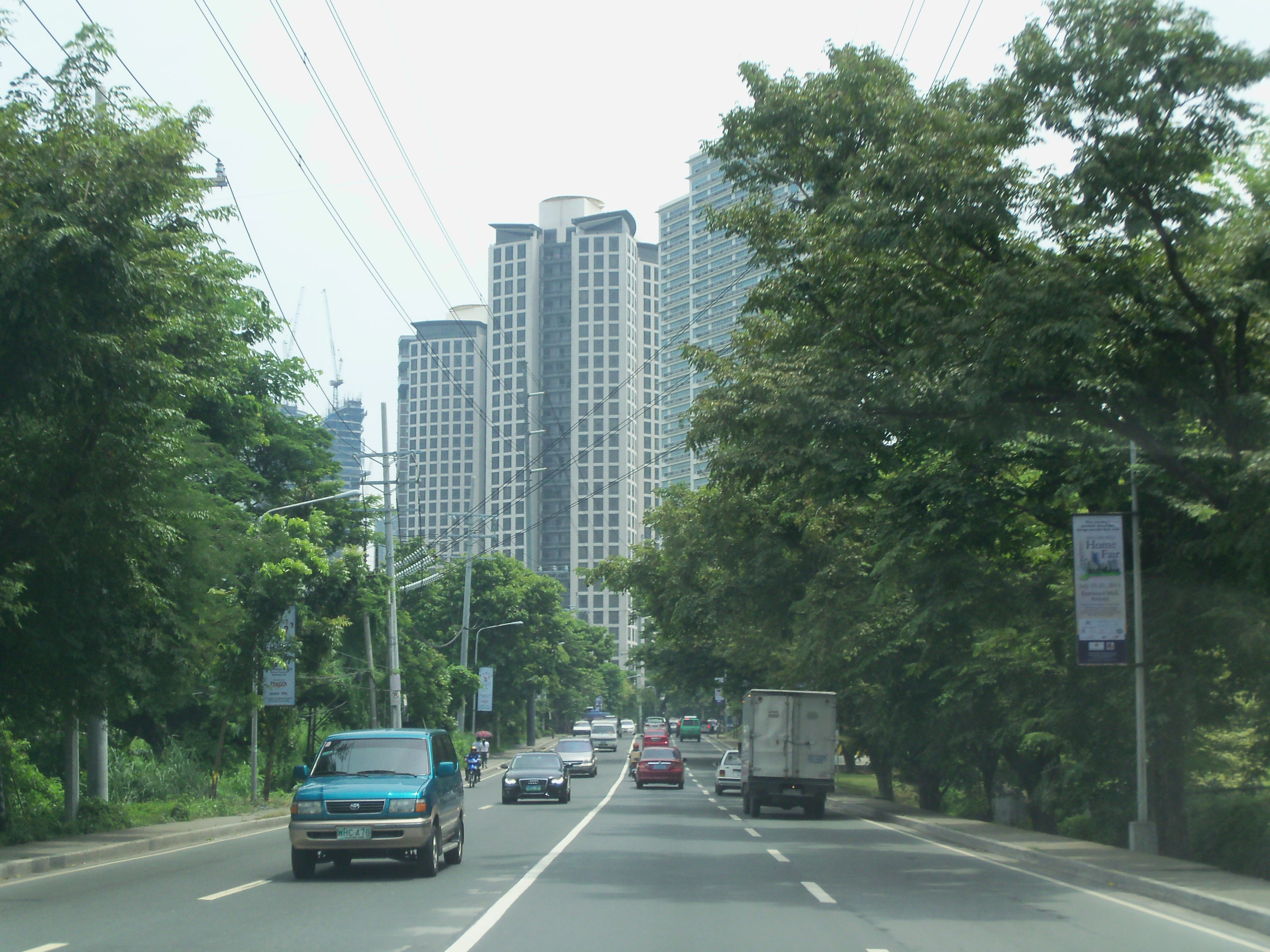
Lawton Avenue looking north from McKinley Hill, Bonifacio Capital District

The main modes of transportation around the city are jeepneys, buses, and tricycles. The road network of the city is part of a system of circumferential and radial roads of Metro Manila. Several national roads, such as Kalayaan Avenue, Lawton Avenue, Circumferential Road 5 (C-5), and Circumferential Road 6 (C-6) runs through the city. There are three bridges that connect the city over the Pasig River (Santa Monica-Lawton Bridge, C.P. Garcia (C-5) Bridge and Napindan (C-6) Bridge). The Southeast Metro Manila Expressway, which is currently under-construction, will traverse parts of the city. The proposed Taguig City Integrated Terminal Exchange, is conceptualized as the primary bus station for buses going to and from Southern Luzon, Visayas, and Mindanao. It is planned to be connected to the under-construction North–South Commuter Railway (NSCR). The city, in partnership with the Department of Science and Technology, is also constructing the Science Terminal in Central Bicutan that will host a science exhibition center on its top floors and a multimodal transport terminal on its bottom floors. Another proposed major road project, the Laguna Lakeshore Road Network, is also planned to connect the city to the other locales around Laguna de Bay. Taguig has banned e-bikes and e-trikes on its national roads.

The No Contact Apprehension Policy (NCAP) of the Metro Manila Development Authority (MMDA) is in-effect along C.P Garcia Avenue (C-5) and the South Super Highway (R-3). The city implements a no number coding policy on its roads, except for national roads patrolled by MMDA traffic enforcers (C-5, East Service Road/Nichols).

==== Cycling ====
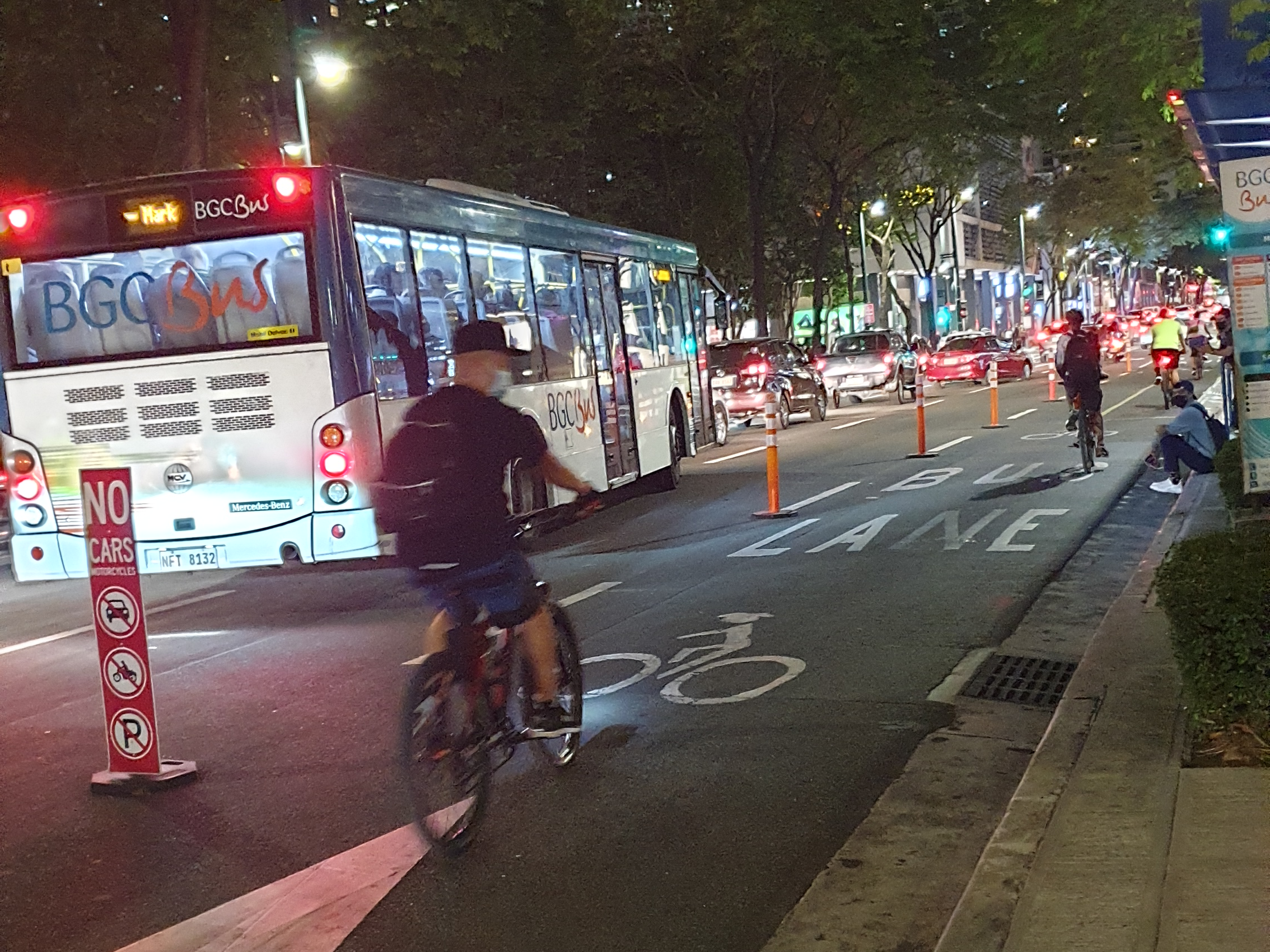
Bicycle lane in Bonifacio Global City

The Taguig Mobility Office is mandated to promote active transport in the city. The city has 60 kilometers (37 mi) of bike lanes protected by bollards, and has set up bike lanes along Bayani Road, C-6 Road, Cayetano Boulevard, and Lawton Avenue, has renovated the bike lane along Laguna Lake Highway (C-6 Road), and is building a dedicated bike lane along General Santos Avenue. There are also bike lanes in roads that leads to barangay halls, bike shops, churches, health centers, malls, schools, parks and emergency services buildings such as fire and police stations. Taguig has 8 bike repair stations spread across different public spaces, and the city has installed 108 inverted U bike racks. Furthermore, the city passed the Bike Friendly Ordinance in 2020 to further extend the use of bicycles as transportation and protect cyclists on the road.

==== Rail ====
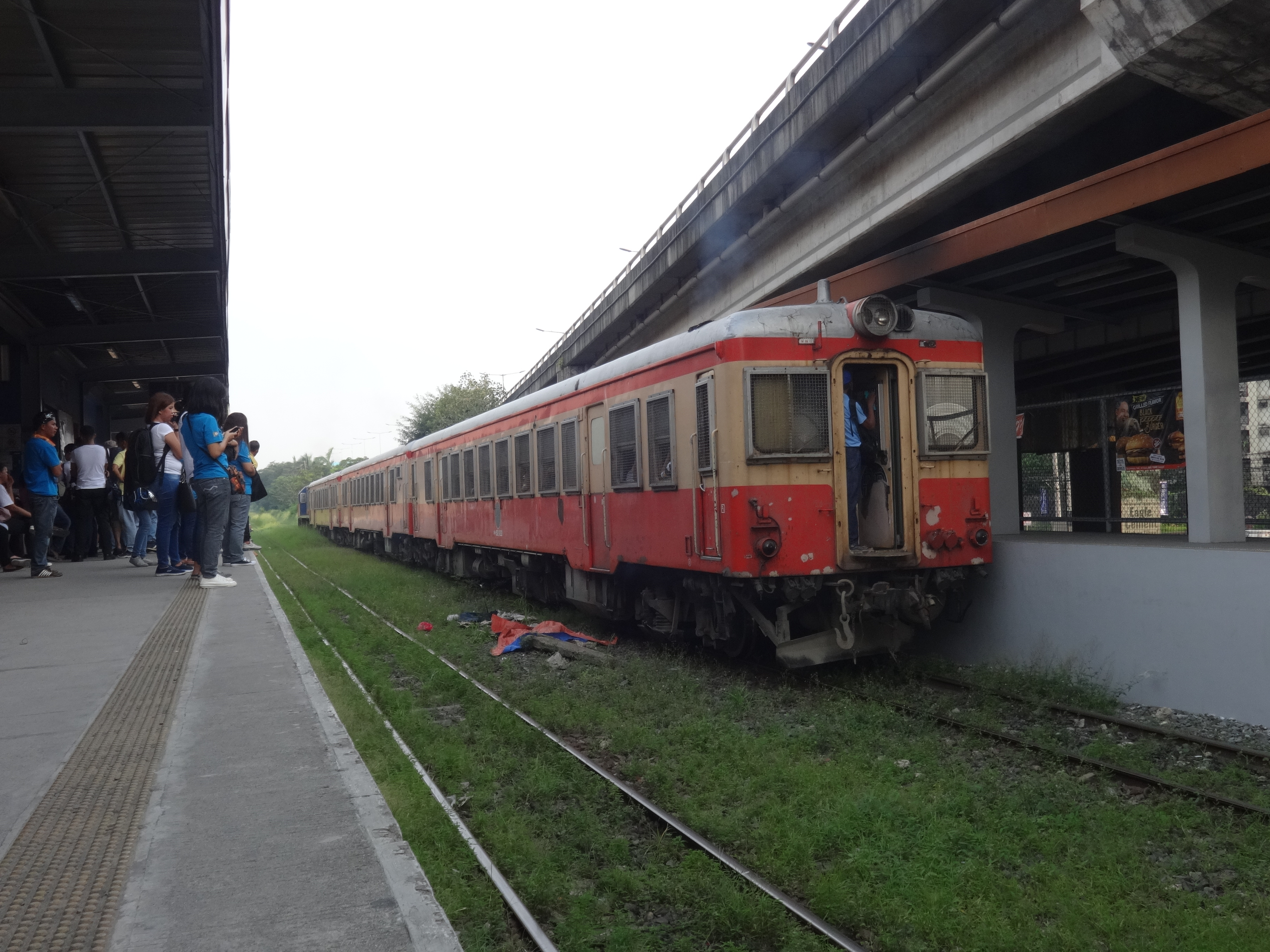
A Philippine National Railway train at FTI station

Metro Manila is served by three metro railway operators, the Light Rail Manila Corporation (LRMC) (Line 1), Light Rail Transit Authority (LRTA) (Line 2) and the Metro Rail Transit Corporation (MRTC) (Line 3). Meanwhile, the Philippine National Railways (PNR), a state-owned commuter rail operator, once operated the Metro Commuter Line which passes through the city. The line will be superseded by the under-construction North–South Commuter Railway (NSCR), which will have two stations within the city: Senate–DepEd and FTI. The Metro Manila Subway is currently constructing five stations within the city running from northeast to southwest. It will have a common alignment with the NSCR, and two common stations where people can transfer in-between the two lines.

MRT Line 3 has a station along EDSA in Guadalupe, Makati, just outside the city's northwestern borders in barangay Cembo. It serves the Fort Bonifacio area, particularly the Embo barangays and Bonifacio Global City. Its Ayala station also connects to Bonifacio Global City via out of station transfers to the BGC Bus and Market-Market jeepney terminals along the EDSA-McKinley Road intersection, while its Magallanes station is also connected to the city via various jeepney routes plying Chino Roces Avenue and South Luzon Expressway, respectively.

The DOST-developed Bicutan Automated Guideway Transit System is planned to have its services extended along C-6 (Laguna Lake Highway).

The Makati Intra-city Subway, a project undertaken by the City of Makati, included plans for stations and a depot in the Embo barangays, which were later reintegrated to Taguig. Its construction was halted to accommodate necessary reworkings due to the territorial changes.

==== Ferry ====
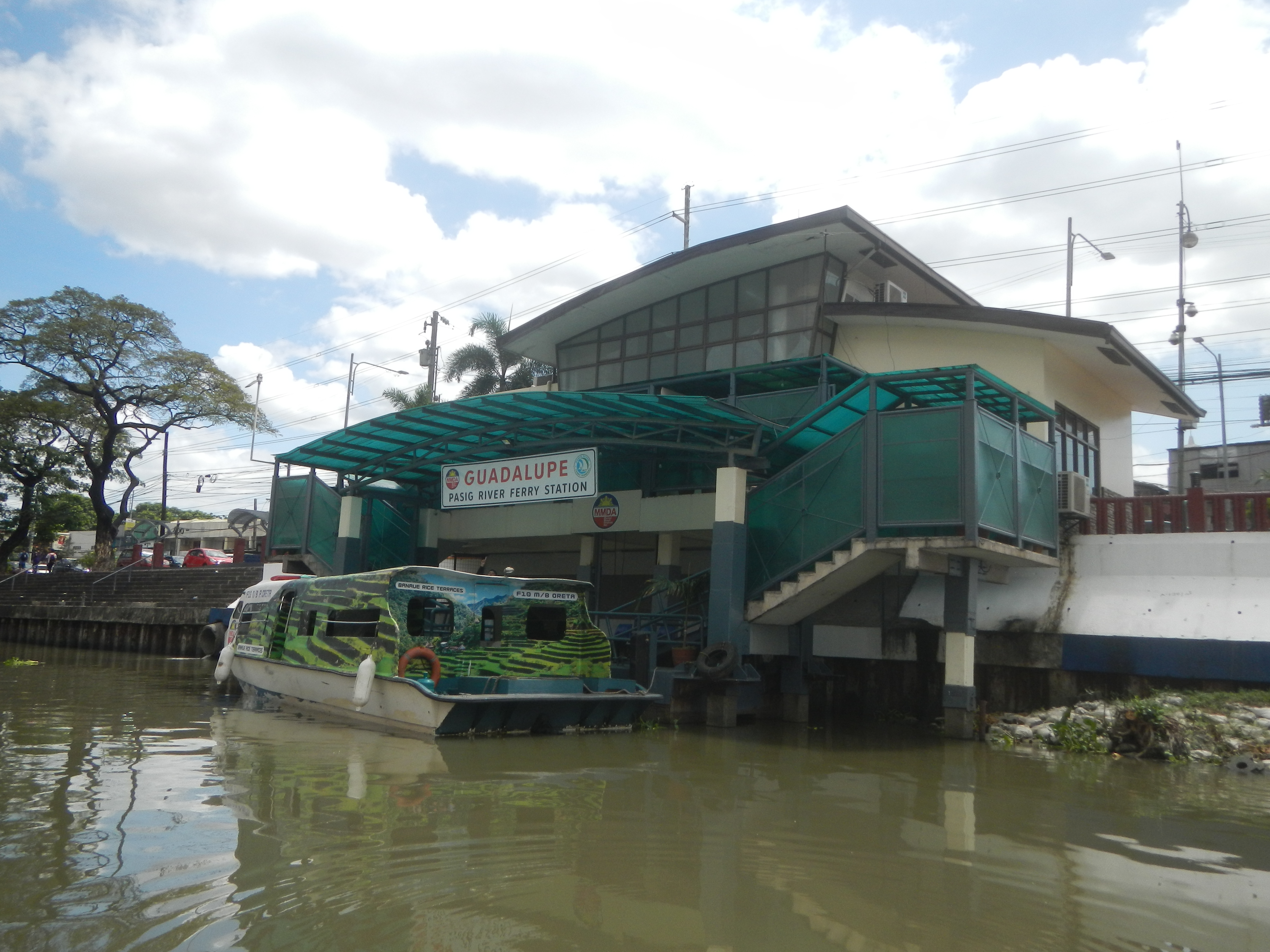
Guadalupe Ferry Station

The city is served by one terminal of the Pasig River Ferry Service, the Guadalupe Ferry Station located in Cembo. The Pinagbuhatan Ferry Station in Pinagbuhatan, Pasig serves the easternmost areas of the city, particularly Napindan and Tipas.

=== Utilities ===
Electricity services are provided by Meralco, the sole electricity distributor in Metro Manila. Manila Water provides the supply and delivery of potable water, and sewerage system in Taguig.

== Human resources ==
=== Education ===
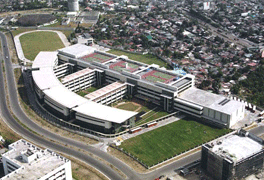
International School Manila in Bonifacio Global City

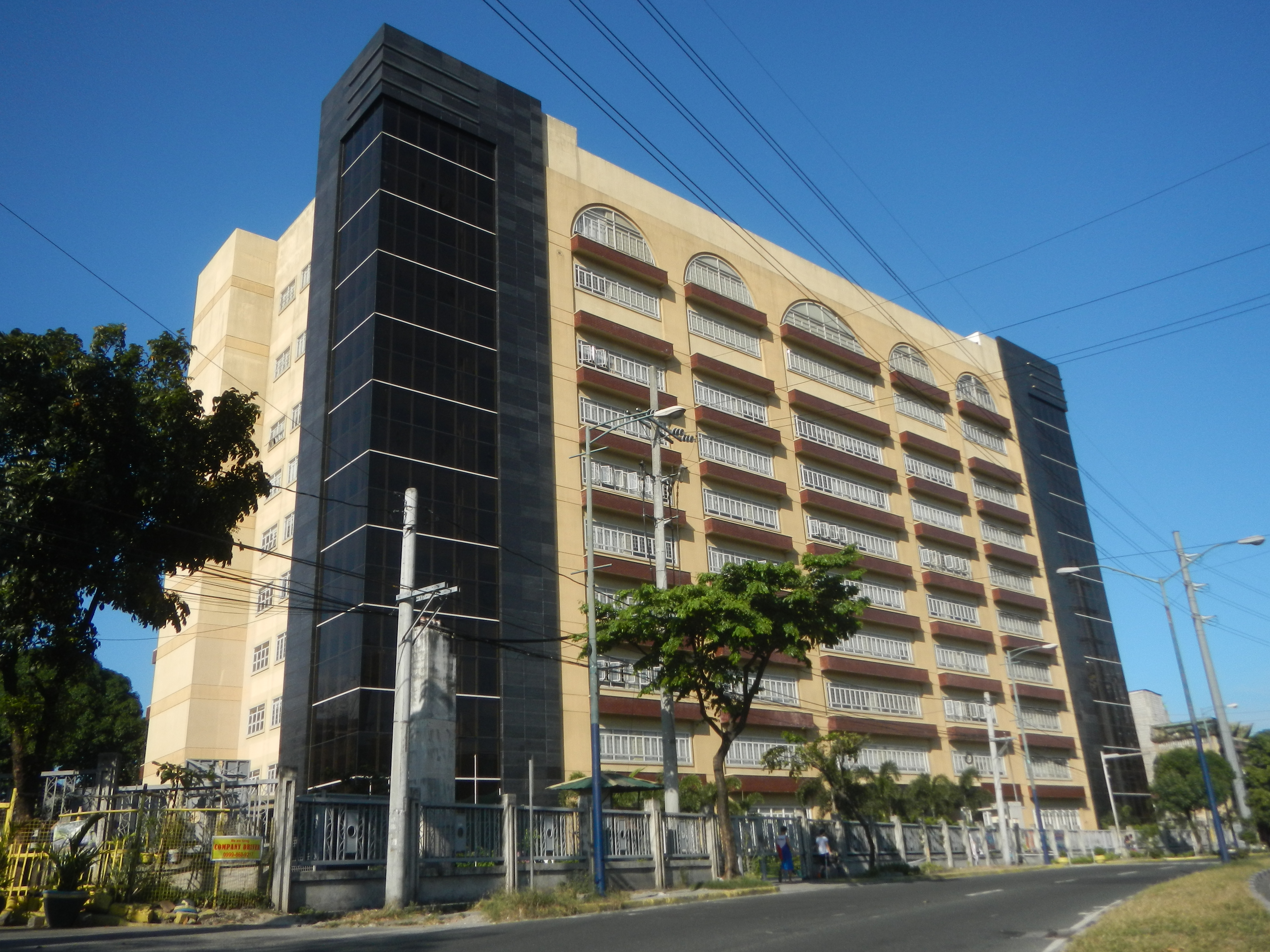
Makati Science High School is one of the three science high schools of the city. The other two are the Taguig Science and the Senator Renato "Compañero" Cayetano Memorial Science and Technology High School.

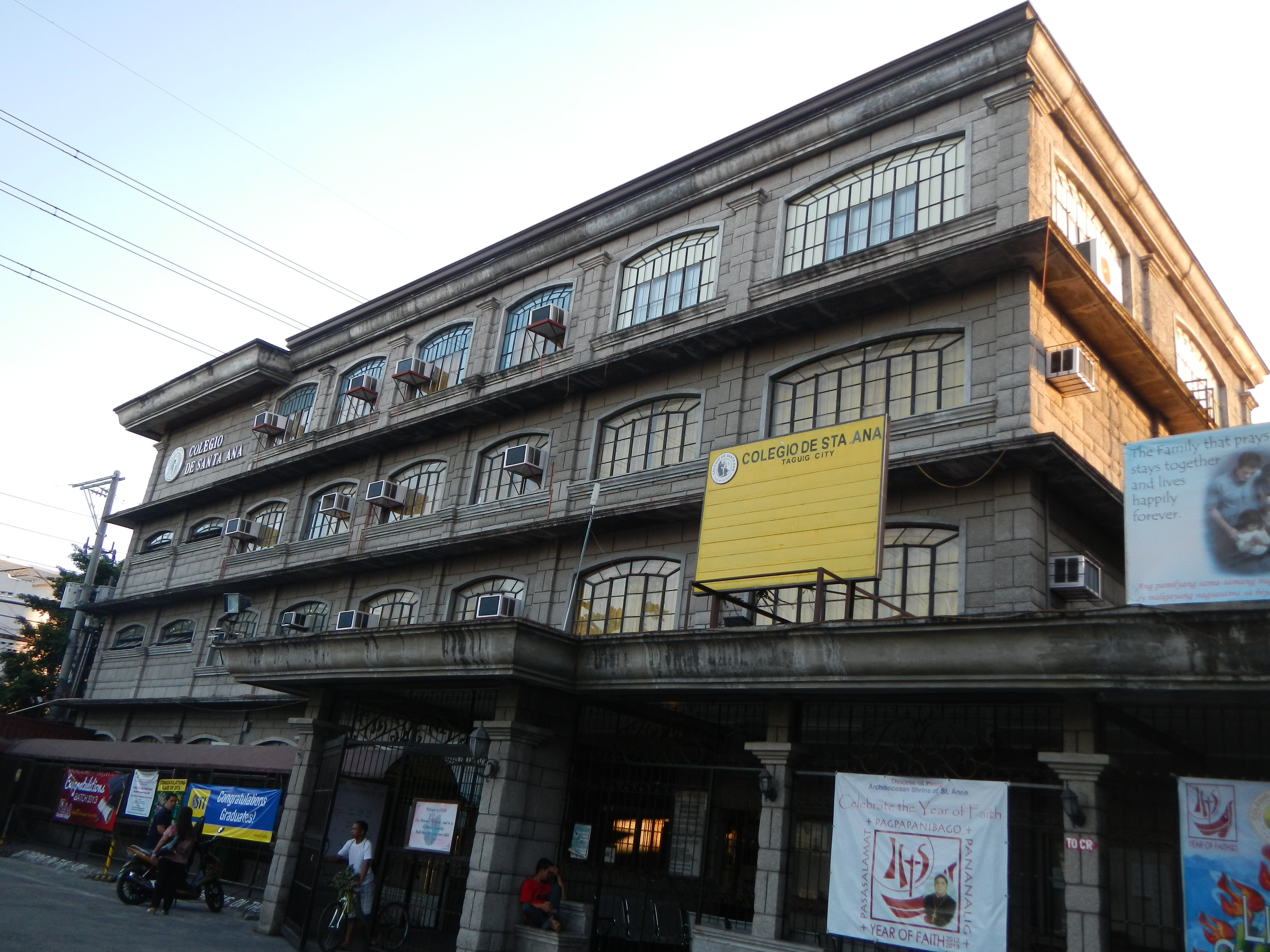
Colegio de Santa Ana is one of the city's most prominent private school.

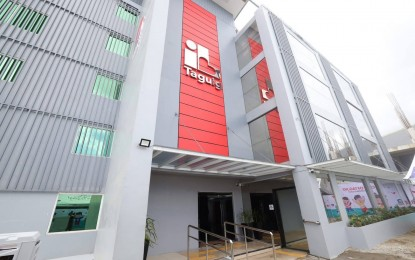
Taguig Yakap Center for Children with Disabilities caters to the children of the city with special needs.

The Schools Division Office of Taguig City and Pateros (SDO-TAPAT), also known as DEPED-TAPAT, administers all the public elementary and high schools within the city. The division is under the supervision of the Department of Education. As of the school year 2024–2025, the city has 52 public elementary and high schools that serves more than 192,000 students.

Following the Supreme Court's decision regarding the territorial dispute between Makati and Taguig which favors the latter, the city gained 14 public elementary and high schools of Makati in the Embo barangays, whose management and administration was transferred from Makati to Taguig starting January 1, 2024. There are three science high schools in the city: Taguig Science High School in San Miguel, Senator Renato "Compañero" Cayetano Memorial Science and Technology High School in Ususan, and the Makati Science High School, which is formerly administered by Makati's SDO, in Cembo. Notable public schools within the city are the Taguig Integrated School, Taguig National High School, Western Bicutan National High School, among others.

There are numerous religious-affiliated schools in Taguig. Catholic schools within the city include the Colegio de Santa Ana (formerly Santa Ana Parochial School), Sto. Niño Catholic School, Tipas Catholic School, Bicutan Parochial School, and the Taguig Campus of the Saint Francis of Assisi College System. Notable Christian institutions in the city are The Fisher Valley College in Hagonoy, and the Victory Leadership Institute in Bonifacio Global City. Taguig is also the home to several Islamic schools, such as the Maharlika Bandara-Inged Integrated School and the Maharlika Village Islamic Madrasa. Most of the Islamic schools are located in or near Maharlika Village.

Several international schools can be found in Taguig, such as The Beacon School, British School Manila, Chinese International School, Everest Academy Manila, International School Manila, Korean International School Philippines, Leaders International Christian School of Manila, and the Manila Japanese School.

The city is heavily investing on its scholarship program: from a ₱750 million budget in 2022, it increased to ₱800 million in 2023, ₱850 million in 2024, and ₱900 million in 2025. The program benefitted 123,000 individuals through allowances as of December 2024, and has produced 4,546 licensed professionals, including engineers, teachers, medical doctors, and lawyers, among others. Its scholarship program is being eyed by the Department of Education as a model to be emulated to other cities and municipalities nationwide, wherein students from the city's crowded public schools are given vouchers so that they can enroll in partner private schools within city.

The Taguig Yakap Center for Children with Disabilities caters to the city's children with special needs. It provides a wide range of services and facilities such as specialized educational programs, specialized consultations, therapy services, and learning and creative spaces.

==== Higher education ====
Main building of the Polytechnic University of the Philippines Taguig

The University of the Philippines Diliman and De La Salle University has established satellite campuses in Taguig, which are both located in University Park, Bonifacio Global City. The latter also has a microcampus in McKinley Hill. Other prominent higher educational institutions in the city include Enderun Colleges, the Meridian International College, and The Fisher Valley College.

There are two fully-fledged satellite campuses of state universities in the city, the Polytechnic University of the Philippines Taguig, and the Technological University of the Philippines - Taguig Campus. The city-run Taguig City University, established through Ordinance No. 29, Series of 2004, operates its main campus on General Santos Avenue in Central Bicutan. In addition, the University of Makati (UMak) in Barangay West Rembo, is under the tutelage of the Makati City Government. Ownership of UMak is currently disputed between the two cities.

The Technical Education and Skills Development Authority (TESDA) manages and supervises the technical and vocational education and training programs in the Philippines. Its headquarters is located along East Service Road in Western Bicutan.

=== Health ===
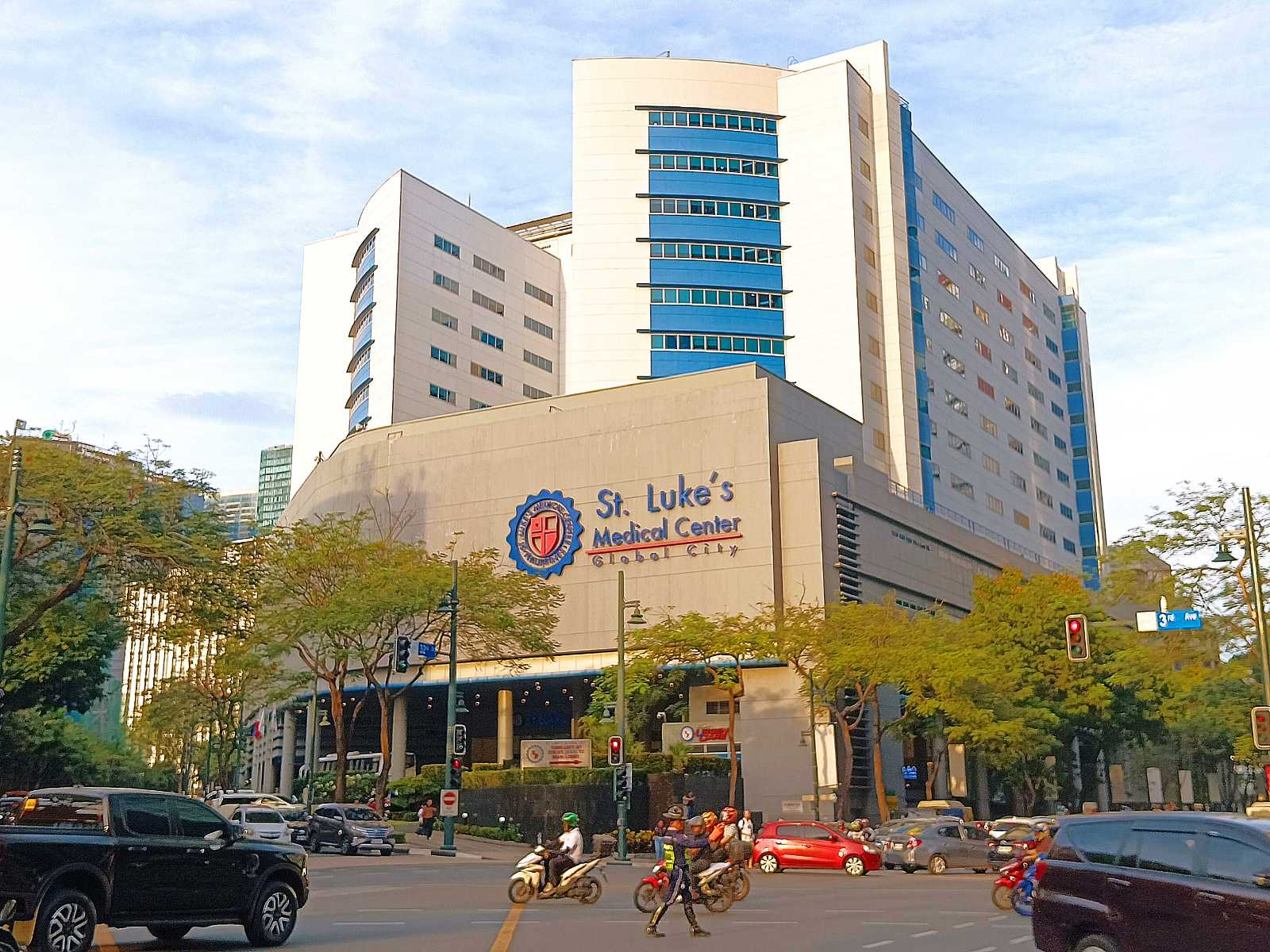
St. Luke's Medical Center – Global City, a private hospital, is one of the most prominent hospitals in the Philippines.

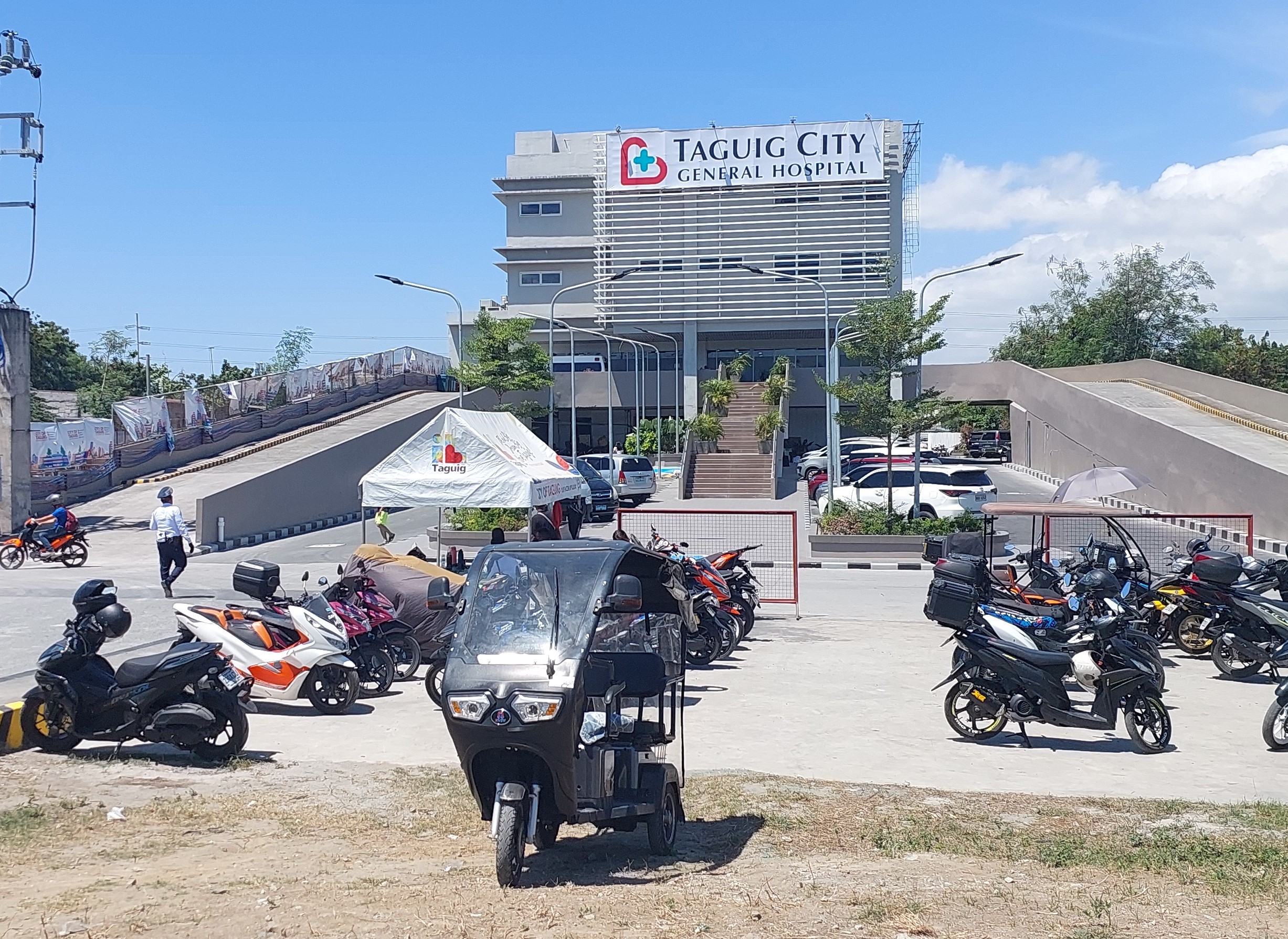
The Taguig City General Hospital in Hagonoy is one of the two city-owned hospitals.

The Taguig City Health Office is responsible for the planning and implementation of the healthcare programs of the city government. The city government operates 39 health centers, 7 primary care facilities, three super health centers, three main laboratories, 29 community-based laboratories, a dialysis center and 5 Animal Bite Treatment Centers. As of 2022, Taguig has 3 government hospitals (total of 375 beds) and 5 private hospitals (total of 685 beds). The city also has 47 dentists, 51 midwives, 141 nurses, 3 nutritionists, 36 medical technologists, 5 sanitary engineers/inspectors, and 726 barangay health workers as of 2022. The city provides Home Health for bedridden patients and Doctor on Call services, which is a 24/7 medical and emergency hotline, for the residents of the city.

There are two city-run hospitals, the Taguig–Pateros District Hospital (TPDH) along East Service Road in Western Bicutan, and the Taguig City General Hospital (TCGH) along C6 Road in Hagonoy. TPDH was expanded in 2022, with the construction of a new building that focuses on women and children's health, including chemotherapy and breast clinics, as well as a center for social hygiene. Meanwhile, TCGH started its operations starting with its outpatient department in January 2025. The Army General Hospital (AGH) in Fort Bonifacio is operated by the Philippine Army, which caters to the health and medical needs of its personnel. The Ospital ng Makati in Pembo is currently operated by the Makati City Government, whose ownership is currently disputed with Taguig.

The city also operates special healthcare facilities across the city. Located at the third floor of the Center for the Elderly in North Signal Village is the Taguig City Dialysis Center, where residents with hemodialysis needs could avail of free limited treatment. The city government also opened the Taguig Yakap Center in Ligid-Tipas, where children with special needs could avail occupational, speech, and physical therapy.

Notable private hospitals in the city are the Bicutan Medical Center, Cruz-Rabe Maternity and General Hospital, Medical Center Taguig, St. Luke's Medical Center – Global City, and the Taguig Doctors Hospital. The Healthway Cancer Care Center in Arca South is the first dedicated cancer care hospital in the Philippines. It was inaugurated in November 2023 by President Bongbong Marcos.

=== Public safety ===
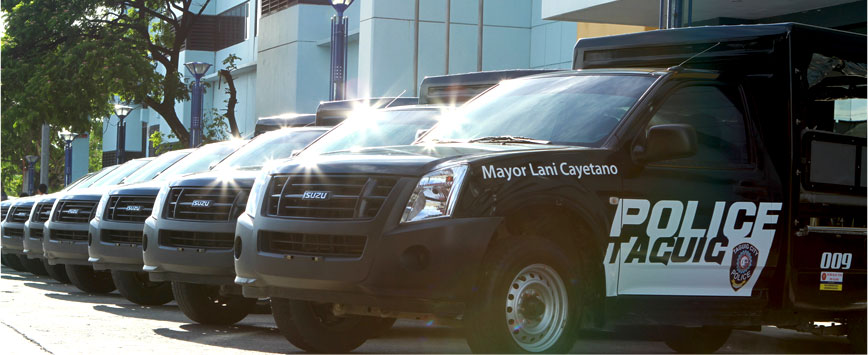
Patrol vehicles with an older design of the Taguig City Police

The Taguig City Police Station of the Southern Police District (SPD) is the local arm of the Philippine National Police. It is the city's primary law enforcement agency and its headquarters is located at the Taguig City Hall complex in Tuktukan. There are 12 police precincts scattered across the city, all maintained by the Taguig City Police Station. Two of these police stations, the West Rembo and Comembo Police Stations, were maintained by the Southern Police District as these were formerly under the Makati City Police Station. Afterward, both stations were operationally transferred from Makati to Taguig following the resolution of the territorial dispute. Their precinct buildings are still claimed by Makati.

Taguig City Police Station earned national recognition in the 123rd Police Service Anniversary in 2024, after achieving a record of over 1,700 drug-related arrests. Additionally, 19 out 38 barangays of Taguig were declared as free from illegal substances in 2024.

Taguig City Police Station
Precinct	Image	Address	Ref.
Fort Bonifacio Police Sub-station (SS1)		40th Street corner 9th Avenue, Bonifacio Global City, Fort Bonifacio	
Western Bicutan Police Sub-station (SS2)		Radian Street, Arca South, Western Bicutan	
Pinagsama Police Sub-station (SS3)		C5 Service Road, Palar Village, Pinagsama	
STUB Police Sub-station (SS4)		Tomasa Avenue, Ususan	
Tipas Police Sub-station (SS5)		Dr. A. Natividad Street, Ibayo-Tipas	
Signal Village Police Sub-station (SS6)		Ballecer Street, Central Signal Village	
MCU Police Sub-station (SS7)		A. Bonifacio Avenue corner Maharlika Road, Upper Bicutan	
Tanyag-Daang Hari Police Sub-station (SS8)		Mañalac Avenue, Tanyag	
Hagonoy Police Sub-station (SS9)		Cadena de Amor Street, Wawa	
Comembo Police Sub-station (SS10)		Anahaw Street, Comembo	
West Rembo Police Sub-station (SS11)		J.P. Rizal Avenue Extension corner T. Alonzo Street, West Rembo	
Bagumbayan-Lower Bicutan Police Sub-station (SS12)		M.L. Quezon Street, Cayetano Complex, Purok 3, Bagumbayan	

== Culture ==
=== Cuisine ===
The food inutak, which originated from the area of Pateros, is a popular snack of the city. It is a rice cake filled with coconut milk and sugar, and baked with charcoal fire. Another popular food that originated from the city is the Tipas Hopia, which was produced by Belen Flores in her bakery at Ibayo-Tipas to compete with the hopia produced by Chinese. Production started in 1988 and it remains a popular snack for Filipino until today. Fried duck is a popular dish across the city owing to the duck-raising industry that historically flourished within the area. Pastil is an affordable Mindanaoan dish popularized in Metro Manila by the Muslim community in Maharlika Village.

=== Sports ===
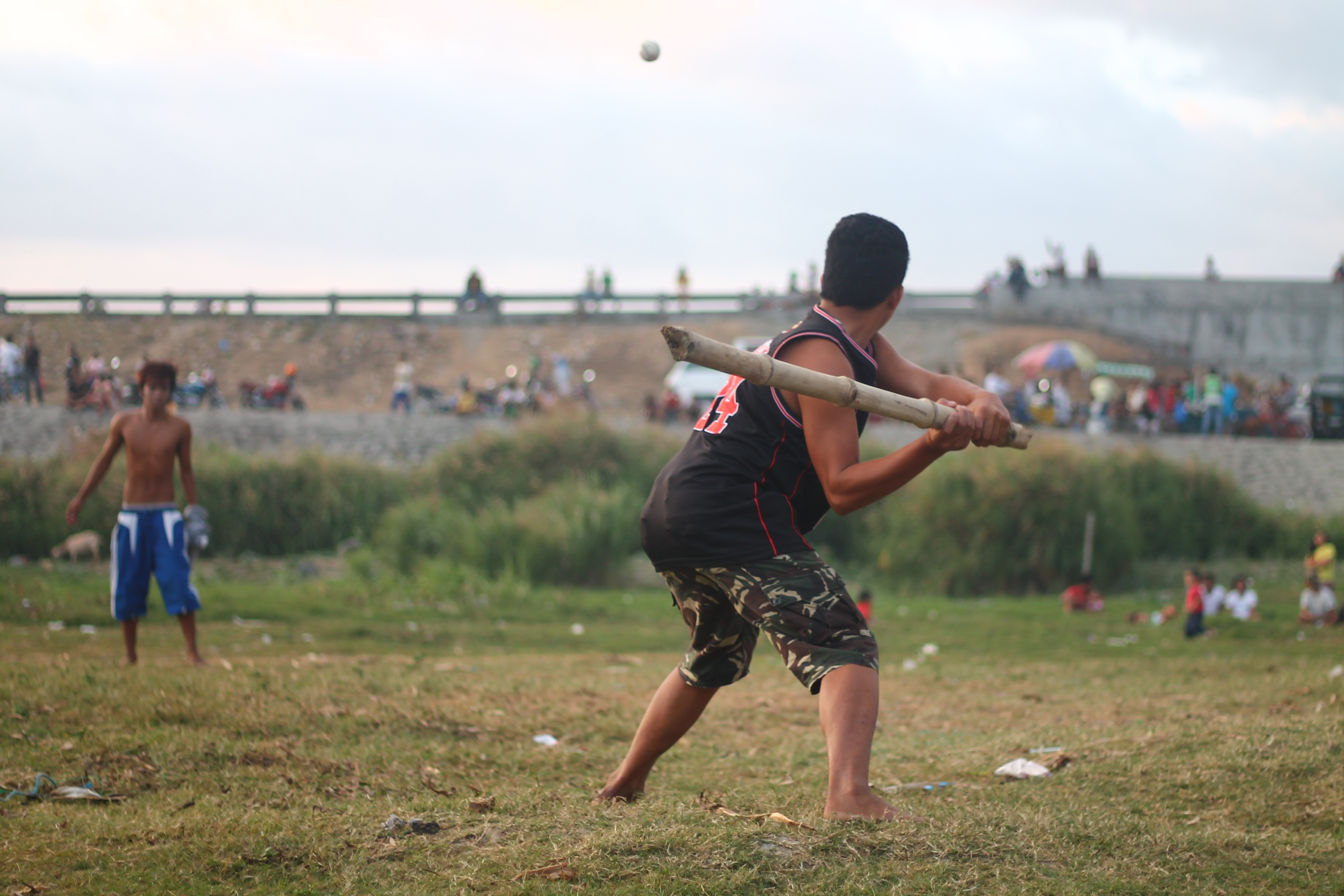
Men playing softball in Napindan

==== Basketball ====
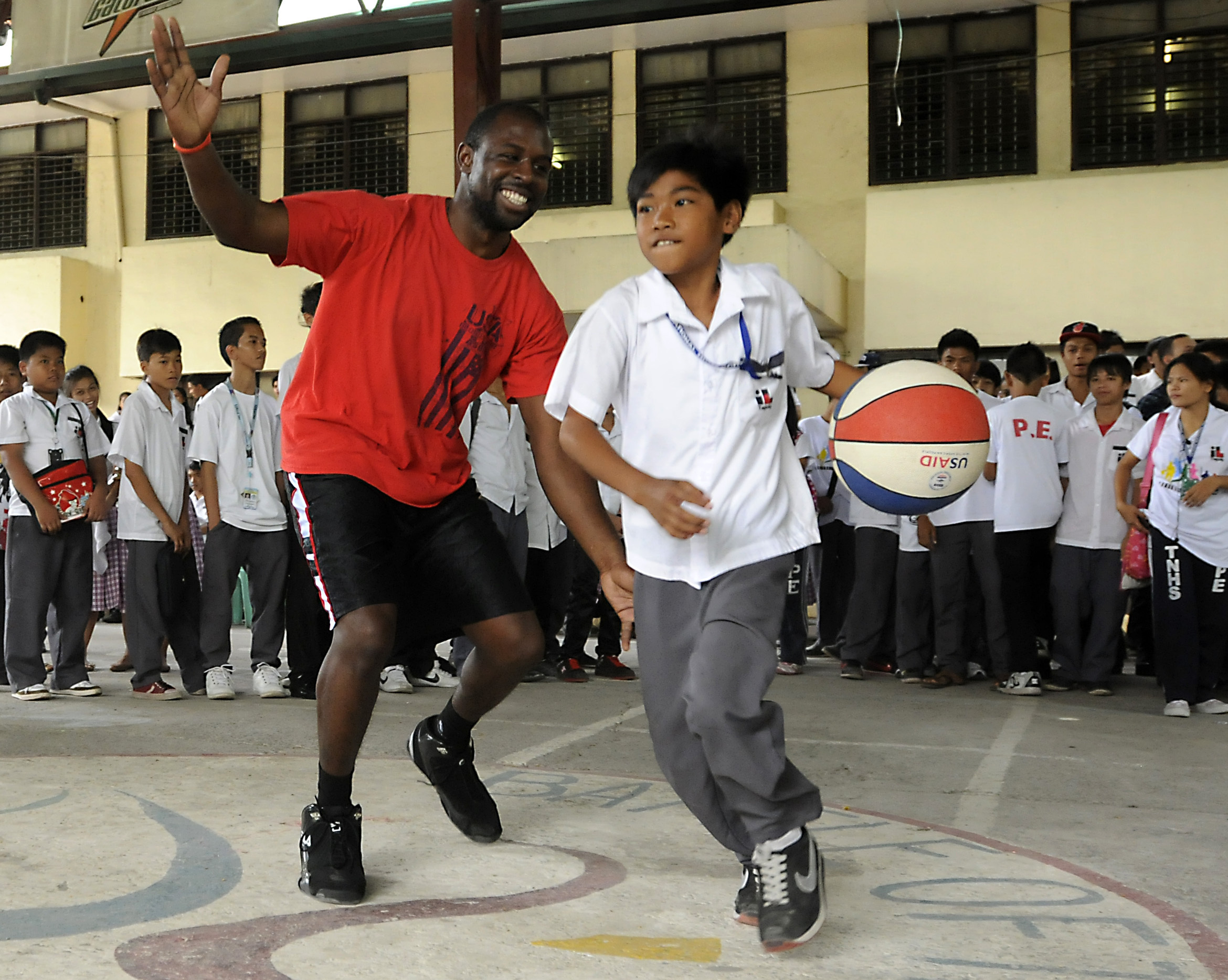
US Marines playing basketball with students at Taguig National High School

The Taguig Generals represents the city in the National Basketball League, where they are the most successful team so far with five total titles, including a four-peat of championship wins. The team's home venues in the city include the Hagonoy Sports Complex (formerly known as C.P. Tiñga Gymnasium) in Hagonoy, and the Cong. Jun Dueñas Gymnasium in Central Signal Village. The city was previously represented in the now defunct Metropolitan Basketball Association, when the SocSarGen Marlins relocated to Taguig in 2001. The team played their home games at the Hagonoy Sports Complex.

The city is also home to one of the iconic basketball courts in the world, the Tenement basketball court in Western Bicutan. It is known for various art work and murals painted on to the court such as a Kobe Bryant tribute mural after his death. It has also become a destination for various National Basketball Association players when they visit the country, such as LeBron James, Paul George, Jordan Clarkson and Julius Randle. The court has been voted as FIBA's best basketball court in the world in 2022.

==== Baseball ====
The Felino Marcelino Sr. Baseball Stadium in Ususan serves as a venue for baseball matches in Taguig and neighboring cities. The 15,421 square metres (1.5421 ha) field has a capacity to accommodate 1,000 spectators. Its amenities are tailor based on international standards to meet the needs of the athletes.

==== Football ====
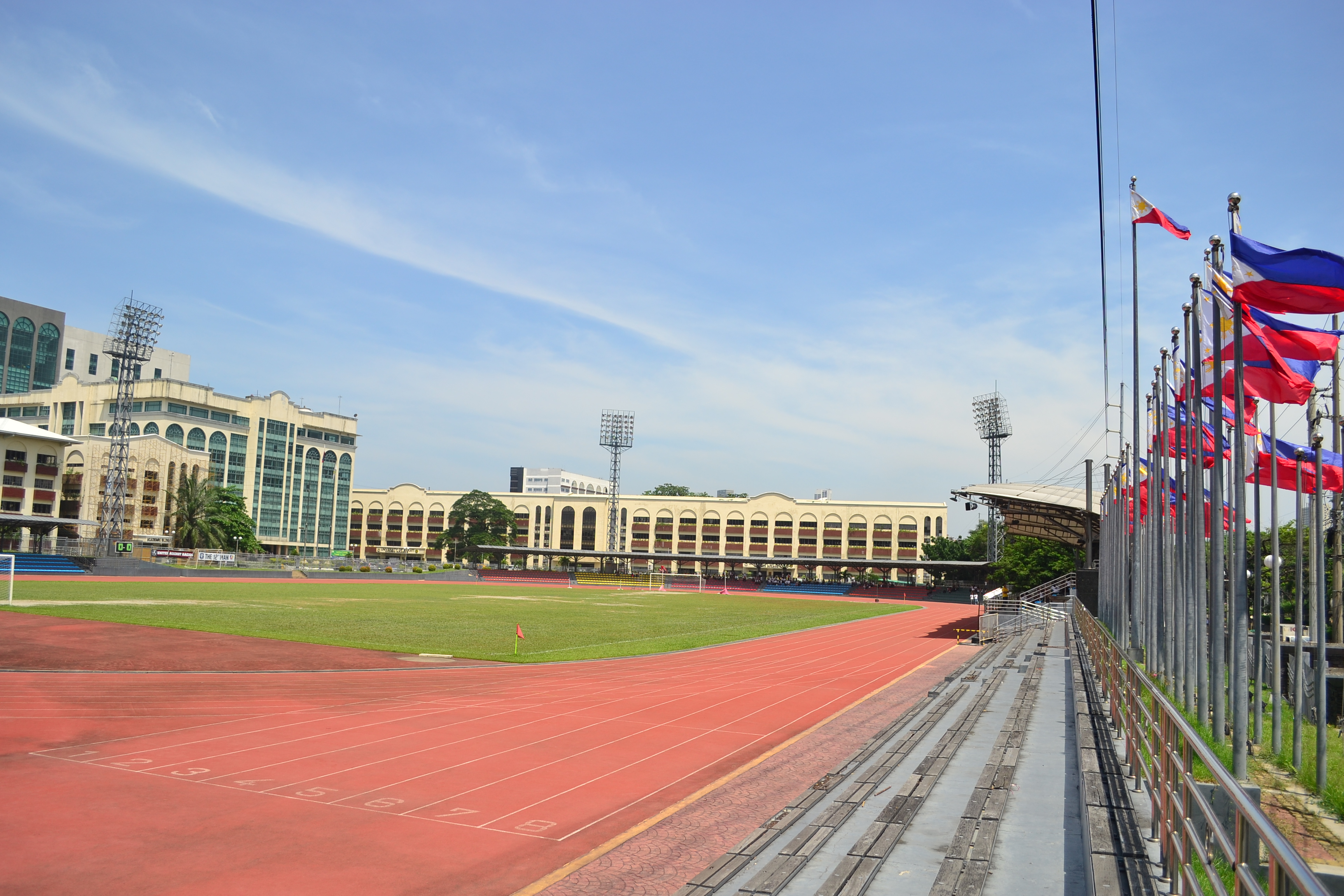
The University of Makati Stadium in West Rembo

In the Philippines Football League, the city is represented by One Taguig F.C. and Maharlika Taguig F.C.. The city is also home to two football stadiums used for top flight matches in the past, McKinley Hill Stadium (formerly known as Emperador Stadium) and University of Makati Stadium. There are also numerous football pitches for training and casual play, such as the Acacia Estates football field, the Arca South football field, Army/ASCOM Field, and Turf BGC.

=== Festivities ===
The Taguig River Festival, originally known as the Santa Anang Banak Taguig River Festival, is celebrated every July 26 as a type of thanksgiving to the city's patron saint, Saint Anne. The festival features several events such as street dance, and tributes to Taguig fishermen and farmers; with the festival culminating in the Pagoda on the River or the parade of boats on July 26.

== Sister cities ==
Sister cities of Taguig
Africa
- Entebbe, Uganda
Americas
- Bluefields, Nicaragua
- Carson, California, United States
- Corpus Christi, Texas, United States
- San Francisco Municipality, Zulia, Venezuela
Luzon, Philippines
- Bangued, Abra
- Bay, Laguna
- Buhi, Camarines Sur
- Cabusao, Camarines Sur
- Conner, Apayao
- Gumaca, Quezon Province
- Juban, Sorsogon
- Lamut, Ifugao
- Nabua, Camarines Sur
- Pateros, Metro Manila
- Polangui, Albay
- Sipocot, Camarines Sur
- Tabaco, Albay
- Tinambac, Camarines Sur
- Tingloy, Batangas
- Vigan, Ilocos Sur
Visayas, Philippines
- Bacolod, Negros Occidental
- Bago City, Negros Occidental
- Dumangas, Iloilo
- Garcia Hernandez, Bohol
- Hernani, Eastern Samar
- Himamaylan, Negros Occidental
- Iloilo City, Iloilo
- Maasin, Iloilo
- Magdiwang, Romblon
- Ormoc, Leyte
- Oton, Iloilo
- Poro, Cebu
- San Francisco, Cebu
- Tagbilaran, Bohol
Mindanao, Philippines
- Boston, Davao Oriental
- Catarman, Camiguin
- Maitum, Sarangani
- Talakag, Bukidnon
- Valencia City, Bukidnon
East Asia
- Beijing, China
- Gaoyou, China
- Goyang, South Korea
- Hangzhou, China
- Shanghai, China
- Tainan, Taiwan
Oceania
- Blacktown, Australia
Europe
- Ballymoney, United Kingdom

== See also ==
- Outline of Metro Manila
