= List of internal boundary disputes in the Philippines =

The following is a list of territorial disputes between two or more local government units (LGUs) over an area in the Philippines. Section 118 of the Local Government Code of the Philippines provides mechanism to resolve boundary disputes among barangays, municipalities, cities, and provinces.

== Unresolved disputes ==
Territory	Claimants	Notes
Areas south of Bonifacio Global City	Pinagsama, Fort Bonifacio, Ususan, Western Bicutan; Post Proper Southside (Taguig)	The area, which consists of Manila American Cemetery and villages south of it, are claimed by Barangay Post Proper Southside. Even after the barangay's transfer of jurisdiction from Makati to Taguig in 2023 as a result of the Supreme Court ruling, the dispute persisted. The claimed area overlaps with Barangays Pinagsama, Ususan, Western Bicutan, and Fort Bonifacio. Post Proper Southside's de facto territory consists of multiple exclaves across the villages in Pinagsama, and the neighborhood along Consular Road inside BGC, where its Barangay Hall and Health Center are also located. On January 11, 2024, the barangay captain of Post Proper Southside had met with the captains of Pinagsama and Ususan as well as DILG Taguig to discuss the solution for this territorial dispute.
Baesa (Caloocan–Quezon City Boundary)	Caloocan; Quezon City	The boundary line in Baesa has yet to be resolved between the two cities.
Caloocan–San Jose del Monte Boundary	Caloocan; San Jose del Monte	Portions of Pangarap Village and Bankers Village that are once part of Tala Estate are claimed by San Jose del Monte. The lack of jurisdiction of the Commission on Settlement of Land Problems (COSLAP) resulted to the nullification of its decision. No significant updates since it was docketed on October 23, 2006.
Bagac–Mariveles boundary	Bagac, Bataan; Mariveles, Bataan	The boundary of two Bataan towns, Bagac and Mariveles has been the subject of a boundary dispute involving a 4 km^{2} (1.5 sq mi) plot of land. The land is situated between barangay Biaan of Mariveles and barangay Quinawan of Bagac. The private owner of the land reportedly pays taxes to the Mariveles local government.
Bangui–Vintar boundary	Bangui, Ilocos Norte; Vintar, Ilocos Norte	The boundary between the two towns involves land covering an area of 10.4996 km^{2} (4.0539 sq mi). In 1995, a memorandum of agreement was signed between the two towns resolving the boundary dispute in favor of Bangui. However, Vintar officials later said that there were "discrepancies" during the signing of the agreement.
Benguet–Ilocos Sur boundary	Benguet; Ilocos Sur	The provincial borders between the towns of Mankayan in Benguet and Cervantes in Ilocos Sur are disputed which involves 1.47 km^{2} (0.57 sq mi) of overlapping land. The boundaries of Sugpon, Ilocos Sur and the Benguet towns of Bakun and Kibungan are also contested.
Bucarot	Adams, Ilocos Norte; Calanasan, Apayao	The sitio is currently administered by Adams, Ilocos Norte but is claimed by the neighboring town of Calanasan in Apayao. Calanasan has appointed its own set of officials for the sitio and has also funded infrastructure in the contested area.
Calumpang	Mabalacat, Pampanga; Bamban, Tarlac	Barangay Calumpang in the Sacobia area is contested by the two towns. Voter residents of the area are registered in Mabalacat and pay taxes to the town. Bamban claims Calumpang as a sitio of its San Vicente barangay and that Calumpang falls on the Tarlac side of the Sacobia River.
Cavinti-Kalayaan-Lumban boundary	Cavinti, Laguna; Kalayaan, Laguna; Lumban, Laguna	The Barangay Map of Cavinti indicates that the northeastern portion of Cavinti extends to the areas claimed by the municipalities of Lumban and Kalayaan as part of Barangay Lumot.
Elizabeth, Ferdinand, and portions of Cacafean	Marcos, Ilocos Norte; Nueva Era, Ilocos Norte	The barangays of Ferdinand, Elizabeth, and parts of Cacafean are contested by the two Ilocos Norte towns. In 2017, Nueva Era laid claim to the disputed areas before the Sangguniang Panlalawigan of Ilocos Norte, which later ruled that the barangays are part of Nueva Era. This decision was supported by the Supreme Court. However the ruling of the decision is yet to be implemented as of February 2018.
Fort Bonifacio area (Bonifacio Global City and Embo barangays) and Barangays Buting, San Joaquin and Kalawaan	Pasig; Taguig; Pateros; Makati (former)	Pateros lays claim to Bonifacio Global City and the Embo barangays, which were disputed between Makati and Taguig but later ruled by the Supreme Court to be under the latter's jurisdiction. Pateros also claims the same area along with three barangays in Pasig, namely Buting, San Joaquin, and Kalawaan. Pateros was allowed to pursue its claim by the Supreme Court despite its ruling involving Makati and Taguig.
Liwagao Island	Caluya, Antique; Bulalacao, Oriental Mindoro	Bulalacao claims that Liwagao is part of its territory as per Presidential Decree No. 1801 of then-President Ferdinand Marcos and that Caluya has only "borrowed" Liwagao which was pursuing fugitives hiding in the island.
Malico	Santa Fe, Nueva Vizcaya; San Nicolas, Pangasinan	Boundary dispute between the two municipalities. Santa Fe claims the territory of barangay Malico in San Nicolas. boundary dispute was already resolved by a NAMRIA survey but was not recognize by the PLGU of Pangasinan under the leadership of Governor Ramon Guico, but the PLGU of Nueva Vizcaya insisted the validity of NAMRIA survey. The Nueva Vizcaya Provincial Board passed a resolution on September 21, 2022 urging San Nicolas officials to respect a memorandum of agreement between NAMRIA, Pangasinan and Nueva Vizcaya about twenty years ago. Both municipalities in both provinces have a barangay named Malico.
Saguitlang	Sison, Pangasinan; Tuba, Benguet	The sitio of Saguitlang spans an area of 15.6 km^{2} (6.0 sq mi).
Sitio Bagong Silang	Muntinlupa; Parañaque	The sitio of Bagong Silang occupies a former property of National Power Corporation spanning an area of 4.1 km^{2} (1.6 sq mi). It is currently under the jurisdiction of Barangay Sucat, Muntinlupa and is disputed with Barangay BF Homes, Parañaque.

== Past disputes ==
Territory	Claimant	Dispute started	Dispute settled	Notes
Boston–Lingig boundary	Boston, Davao Oriental; Lingig, Surigao del Sur	1992	2020	Davao Oriental and Surigao del Sur settled a boundary dispute between their two towns; Boston (Davao Oriental) and Lingig (Surigao del Sur). The dispute was resolved through a common ordinance passed by the two provincial governments which delineate the boundaries between the two towns ceding territory in favor of Boston excluding existing build-up areas under Barangay Rajah Cabungsuan of Lingig, Surigao del Sur. 26 km^{2} (10 sq mi) out of the 60 km^{2} (23 sq mi) disputed territory is determined to be under Davao Oriental.
Bagu–Cabiten boundary	Bagu, Bakun, Benguet; Cabiten, Mankayan, Benguet	–	2015	Border dispute between the barangays of Bagu in Bakun town and Cabiten in Mankayan town. Both of the towns are part of Benguet province. Efforts to resolve the dispute date as early as 1999 during the tenures of Bakun Mayor Tico Dalmones of Bakun and Mankayan Mayor Manalo Galuten. Five corners were identified in as demarcating points of the barangay borders. The dispute was resolved in 2015.
Cabagsac–Pinpin boundary	Cabagsac, Pampanga; Pinpin, Pampanga	–	1700s	Two towns in Pampanga province had a land dispute which was settled in court in favor of Cabagsac. Cabagsac was renamed as San Luis after the wife of the lawyer which represented the town in the land dispute. Pinpin is now known as Santa Ana.
Caloocan–Malabon boundary	Libis Baesa, Caloocan; Potrero, Malabon	2001	2014	Both the city governments of Caloocan and Malabon agreed to develop 80 hectares (200 acres) of disputed land, preempting any court decisions. This dispute began when Malabon became a highly urbanized city, taking over the lands formerly part of Caloocan.
Sudipen–Tagudin boundary	Sudipen, La Union; Tagudin, Ilocos Sur	–	2015	A century-old boundary dispute between the towns of Sudipen, La Union and Tagudin, Ilocos Sur was resolved in 2015. The towns agreed on a boundary established along the Amburayan River.
Bicutan Market and Interchange (Parañaque–Taguig boundary)	San Martin de Porres, Parañaque; North Daang Hari, Taguig	2001	2001?	The area has been under the de facto administration of Parañaque since the dialogue.
Cotabato City	Bangsamoro; Cotabato City (claims not to be part of Bangsamoro)	2019	2023	Cotabato City Mayor Cynthia Guiani-Sayadi has opposed the inclusion of Cotabato City (formerly part of the Soccsksargen region) in the Bangsamoro after most of its residents favored to ratify the Bangsamoro Organic Law in the 2019 plebiscite which created the autonomous region. Guiani-Sayadi filed an electoral protest seeking to nullify the results claiming that residents who opposed the law were prevented to vote due to threats and intimidation from supporters and attempted to delay the turnover of the city to the Bangsamoro regional government. Guiani-Sayadi lost to Bruce Matabalao in the 2022 mayoral elections. The new city council under the Matabalao's administration formally affirmed Cotabato City's inclusion while the petition by the former city administration was pending. The Supreme Court affirmed the city being part of the autonomous region in January 2023 and found insufficient evidence to support fraud which allegedly happened during the plebiscite.
Fort Bonifacio area (Bonifacio Global City and Embo barangays)	Taguig; Makati	1993	2023	Includes the Bonifacio Global City and the EMBO (Enlisted Men's Barrio) barangays, which is recognized by the Supreme Court of the Philippines as part of Taguig.
Ambos Camarines-Tayabas Boundary (East Quezon): Kagtalaba; Plaridel (also called Macahadoc); Kabuluan (also spelled as Cabuluan following Tayabas Tagalog); Don Tomas; Guitol; Tabugon; Maulawin; Patag Ibaba; Patag Iraya (also spelled Ilaya in Tayabas Tagalog)	Santa Elena, Camarines Norte; Calauag, Quezon	1930s	2001	In October 1991, Quezon Governor Eduardo Rodriguez and Calauag Mayor Julio Lim caused the removal of the marker. Throughout the proceedings, Government agencies including the Department of Budget and Management, COMELEC, and the National Statistics Office recognized the jurisdiction of the town of Santa Elena, Camarines Norte over the 9 barangays. In 2000, Judge Regino held Governor Rodriguez and Mayor Lim guilty of contempt, with a maximum imprisonment of 6 months as well as a fine of ₱1,000 for the erection of a new boundary marker. Gateway to Bicolandia Boundary Arch was constructed to replace the former boundary mark.
