= Taguig Science High School =

Public high school in Taguig, Philippines

- Mataas na Paaralang Pang-Agham ng Tagig

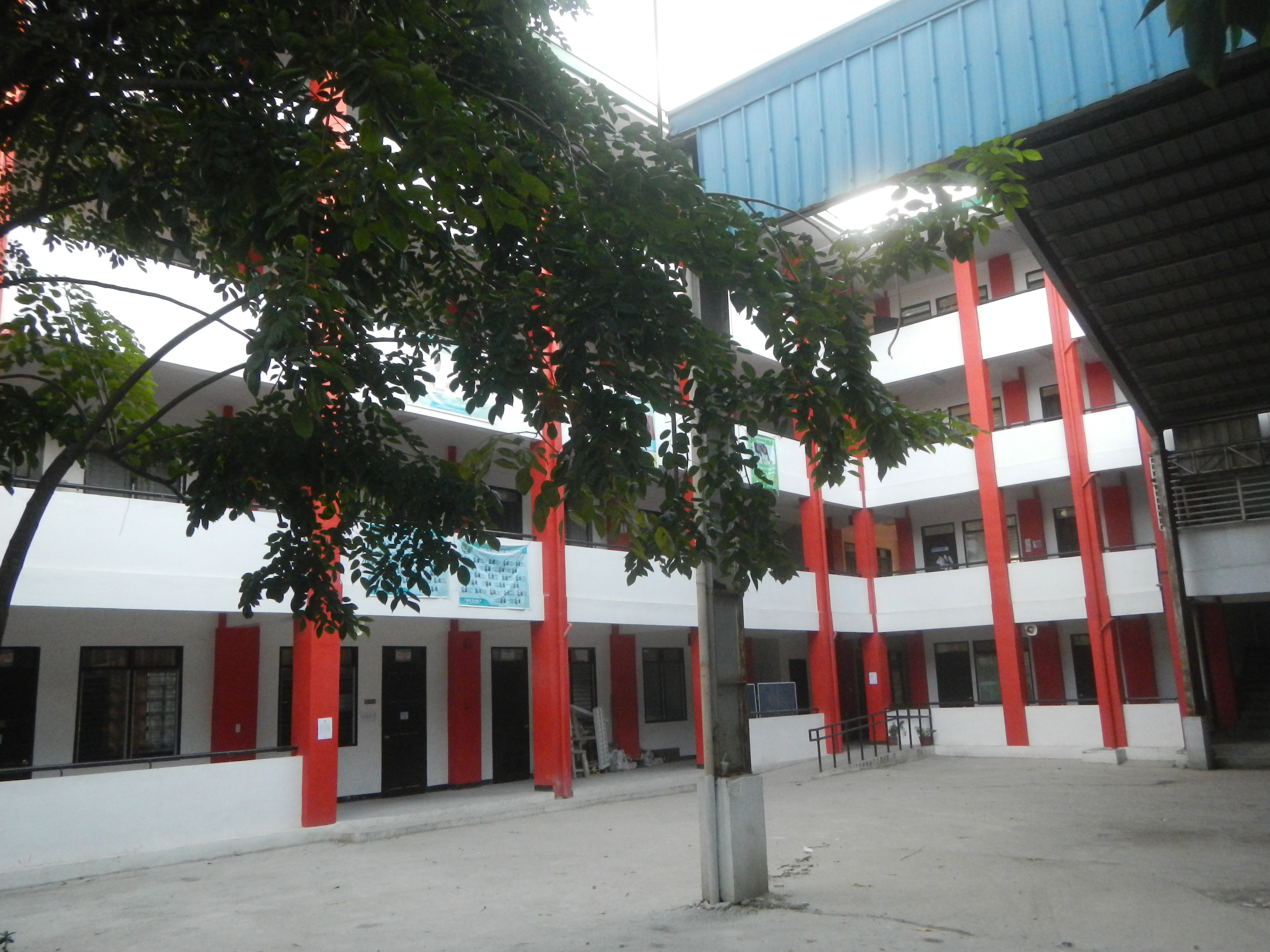

Location
- 5 M. L. Quezon Avenue, San Miguel; Taguig, Metro Manila; Philippines
- Coordinates: 14°31′14″N 121°04′25″E

Information
- Type: Public Science High School
- Motto: Leading the Road to Excellence
- Established: September 15, 2004
- Educational authority: Schools Divisions Office of Taguig City and Pateros
- Principal: Donald Bruno
- Grades: 7 to 12
- Gender: coed
- Language: English, Filipino
- Campus type: Urban
- Colors: Green, White and Black
- Nickname: Scientians
- Newspaper: SinagTala (Filipino), People's Reliable Information Source Media (English)
- Budget: ▼ ₱21.5 million (2025)

Taguig Science High School (TSHS) (Filipino: Mataas ng Paaralang Pang-Agham ng Tagig), also known as TagSci or TagSat, is a public science high school located in San Miguel, Taguig, Philippines. It is one of the three science high schools of the city, and is managed and administered by the Schools Divisions Office of Taguig City and Pateros (SDO-TaPat). TSHS traces its roots from the Special Science class of Signal Village National High School.

Its establishment was made possible by the collaboration of the Taguig City Government under Mayor Sigfrido R. Tiñga with the SDO-TaPat, then under Schools Division Superintendent, Jovita O. Calixihan.

== History ==
In June 2002, a special science class with 35 students each section was established at Signal Village National High School for the academic year of 2002-2003.

On October 22, 2003, A resolution endorsing the creation of Taguig Science High School was approved by the Office of the Division of Taguig and Pateros (TaPat) signed by the President of TAPASPA and PESPA and the Assistant Schools Division Superintendent and OIC Dr. Estrellita Putian.

On November 10, 2003, Dr. Estrellita Putian, OIC, submitted the Feasibility Study for the creation of Taguig Science High School to Councilor Myla Rodriguez Valencia, Chairman, Committee on Education, Municipality of Taguig.

On December 9, 2003, The Municipality of Taguig enacted Ordinance No. 104, s. 2003, an Ordinance establishing the Taguig Science High School to be funded by the Local School Board of Taguig.

On February 13, 2004, The Division Office of Taguig and Pateros through Dr. Rolando Magno, Schools Division Superintendent, forward a copy of the said ordinance to Hon. Edilberto de Jesus, Secretary of Education.

On March 12, 2004, The request of the local government for allocation of funds in the amount of Thirty Million Pesos (P30.0 M) for the construction of a two-storey (12 classrooms) school building with laboratories for the proposed Taguig Science and Technology Multi-Purpose Hall was referred to the DepEd-NCR by the Planning Office of DepEd, Central Office.

On March 29, 2004, The Regional Office denied the request of the local government re: the appropriation for the construction of the proposed Taguig Science High School.

On April 1, 2004, The Regional Office acknowledged the receipt of Ordinance No. 104, s. 2003 and requested the Division Office to submit the requirements for the establishment of Taguig Science High School as stipulated in DepEd Order No. 5, s. 1989. Additional requirements for the establishment of Taguig Science High School were requested from the Division Office by the Regional Office on June 4, 2004. On August 9, 2004, The Division Office submitted to the regional Office the evaluated documents of the Taguig Science High School. It was followed by an inspection of the school conducted by Dr. Luz Rojo, Chief of Secondary Education division and Mrs. Aurora A. Franco, Education Supervisor II on September 8, 2004. In September 14, the Regional Office approved the establishment of Taguig Science High School. In September 15, Taguig Science High School was founded and was officially declared as the first high school in Taguig that specializes the Science, Math and English curriculum.

In June 2016, Taguig Science High School opened its main campus at Brgy. San Miguel, Taguig City for the incoming Grade 7 and 10 and Senior High School of Academic Year 2016-2017. It initially housed approximately 300 Grade 10 Students and more than 200 Senior High School students.

It offered the Senior High School application, in accordance to the resolution that was ordered by the Department of Education, for incoming students which were separated into 2 tracks -Science and Technology, Engineering and Mathematics (STEM) Track and Accountancy and Business Management (ABM) Track.

In June 2017, Since the opening of the new Senior High Building, Taguig Science High School was opened to most year levels of the Junior High School (Grades 7,9,10) and Senior High School (Grades 11 - 12). The Junior and Senior High school have their own dedicated buildings for the division of the year levels.

In June 2018, Taguig Science High School was opened to all year levels of the Junior High School (Grades 7-10) and Senior High School (Grades 11 - 12). The Junior and Senior High school have their own dedicated buildings for the division of the year levels.

In 2020, Taguig Science High School was the subject of controversy due to reports on social media about sexual harassment from both faculty members and students of the school. The reports brought the #TagSciDoBetterNow hashtag viral, with Senator Risa Hontiveros and Kabataan partylist representative Sarah Elago defending the students and calling for government investigation into the manner. On October 29, the school administration announced the formation of an investigative committee for the reported cases and other measures to protect students from harassment.

TSHS placed second runner-up in the 2022 Tagisang Robotics of the Department of Science and Technology.

== Campus ==
Its main campus is located along M.L. Quezon Avenue in Barangay San Miguel. It also has an annex campus integrated with the Hagonoy Sports Complex in Barangay Hagonoy. Its Multimedia Arts Cyberlab (MAClab) is equipped with 26 units of iMac.

== See also ==
- Makati Science High School
- Senator Renato "Compañero" Cayetano Memorial Science and Technology High School
