= Makati–Taguig boundary dispute =

Disputed area in Metro Manila, Philippines

- Part of Internal boundary disputes in the Philippines
- Contested territory between Makati and Taguig, and Pateros, including Bonifacio Global City
- Date: November 22, 1993 – April 3, 2023 (29 years, 4 months, 1 week and 6 days)
- Location: Fort Bonifacio area including Embo barangays and Bonifacio Global City in Metro Manila, Philippines
- Methods: Lawsuit
- Result: Taguig victory: Supreme Court affirmed Taguig's jurisdiction over the Fort Bonifacio military reservation (including Bonifacio Global City and the ten Embo barangays).; Makati was ordered to stop exercising jurisdiction over the entire Fort Bonifacio reservation; Political and territorial jurisdiction of Embo barangays transferred from Makati to Taguig in 2023; Taguig took full possession of Makati-developed assets and other public facilities in the Embo barangays

Parties
Makati	Taguig

Lead figures
Mayor of Makati; Jejomar Binay (first); Elenita Binay; Jejomar Binay Jr. Romulo Peña Jr. Abigail Binay (last); Legal counsels Pio Kenneth Dasal; Glenda Isabel Biason; Gwyn Gareth Mariano; Makati city administrator Claro Certeza (last)	Mayor of Taguig; Ricardo Papa Jr. (first); Isidro Garcia; Sigfrido Tiñga; Lino Cayetano; Lani Cayetano (last); Legal counsel Arturo Corvera; Taguig city administrator Lyle Niño Pasco; Jose Luis Montales (last)

The local city governments of Makati and Taguig of the Philippines were involved in a territorial dispute. The cities claimed jurisdiction over the entirety of the Fort Bonifacio military reservation, which includes the financial district of Bonifacio Global City (BGC) and Enlisted Men's Barrios (Embo) barangays.

Taguig has administration over Bonifacio Global City and some territory to its south as part of its Fort Bonifacio barangay. In addition, Pinagsama exercises control over the McKinley Hill area and Palar Village, while Barangay Ususan controls some exclaves along Circumferential Road 5 (C-5), such as Logcom Village, Wildcat Village, and Aranai Village. Makati claims the main Bonifacio Global City area, Bonifacio Capital District that includes McKinley Hill, Manila American Cemetery, the lands along C-5, and most parts of Palar Village and Fort Andres Bonifacio to be under the jurisdiction of its barangays, Post Proper Northside and Post Proper Southside, while Ususan's exclaves along the eastbound portion of C-5 are also claimed by Barangays Rizal and Pembo. Pateros also claims to control the Embo barangays of Makati and some barangays in Taguig and Pasig. Pateros's claim includes Bonifacio Global City. However, the legal case it filed is separate from the case involving Makati and Taguig.

In 2023, the Supreme Court ruled with finality that Taguig has jurisdiction over Fort Bonifacio and the Embo barangays. The jurisdiction of the Embo barangays were transferred to Taguig on 2023, and in September 2024, these barangays were apportioned to the two legislative districts of Taguig and Pateros. By virtue of a court order, Makati was ordered to turnover to Taguig public facilities in the Embo barangays, including health centers, covered courts, parks, multipurpose buildings, barangay halls and other government properties in May 2025.

== Background ==
Map of the Embo barangays, which are involved the territorial dispute

The claims of Makati and Taguig over Fort Bonifacio and the surrounding Enlisted Men's Barrios (Embo) barangays are deeply linked with historical events, land acquisitions, and legal proclamations, forming the basis of a complex territorial dispute.

Makati's claim is based on land ownership records indicating that the disputed areas and Fort William McKinley (now Fort Andres Bonifacio) were not under Taguig's jurisdiction, along with legal proclamations and various official documents such as censuses since 1918, elections since 1975, cadastral mappings, and presidential decrees. Furthermore, a directory of Rizal province, which encompassed Makati and Taguig (Tagig) at that time, showed that those areas are part of Makati as of 1934. However, those areas were not listed among Makati's (formerly San Pedro [de] Macati) barrios until the early 20th century.

On the other hand, Taguig's claim traces its existence since being a pueblo of the province of Tondo (later Manila) during the Spanish colonial rule, with legislative acts in the early 1900s enacted to revise its territory, including the annexation of the adjacent municipalities of Pateros (which also has claims on the disputed area) and Muntinlupa. It is also underscored by the establishment of Fort William McKinley within Taguig's territory, as confirmed by presidential proclamations and cadastral mappings. Key documents such as the Proclamation No. 423 of 1957 and cadastral mappings exclude the disputed areas, reinforcing Taguig's territorial claim over Fort Bonifacio.

On November 22, 1993, Taguig filed a complaint before the Regional Trial Court (RTC) of Pasig against Makati, Executive Secretary Teofisto Guingona Jr., Department of Environment and Natural Resources (DENR) Secretary Angel Alcala, and Lands Management Bureau (LMB) Director Abelardo Palad Jr. The complaint arose from Taguig's territorial dispute with Makati over the entirety of Fort Bonifacio and the Enlisted Men's Barangays (EMBOs). Taguig averred that these areas were within its territory and jurisdiction. It also alleged that Presidential Proclamation Nos. 2475, s. 1986 and 518, s. 1990 were unconstitutional because they altered Taguig's boundaries without the required plebiscite. The trial court also imposed a 20-day temporary restraining order (TRO) against Makati, Alcala, and Palad.

== Supreme Court ==
The City of Makati seeks to nullify Special Patent Nos. 3595 and 3596 signed by President Fidel V. Ramos in 1995, which places parts of Fort Bonifacio under the jurisdiction of the City of Taguig. The suit of the City of Makati was dismissed on June 27, 2008, through Associate Justice Leonardo Quisumbing. Due to a pending civil case filed by the Taguig City Government asking the court to define its territorial boundaries, the City of Makati cannot halt Taguig from collecting taxes on land located in Fort Bonifacio because it does not have any other source of sufficient income.

=== 1994 Writ of Preliminary Injunction ===
On August 2, 1994, the Pasig Regional Trial Court issued a Writ of Preliminary Injunction, explicitly referring to Parcels 3 and 4, Psu-2031 comprising the entirety of the Fort Bonifacio military reservation:

1. Enjoining defendants Secretary of the Department of Environment and Natural Resources and Director of Land Management Bureau, from disposing of, executing deeds of conveyances over, issuing titles, over the lots covered by Proclamation Nos. 2475 and 518; and
2. Enjoining defendant Makati from exercising jurisdiction over, making improvements on, or otherwise treating as part of its territory, Parcels 3 and 4, Psu-2031 comprising Fort Bonifacio.
3. Ordering defendants to pay the cost of the suit.

=== 2011 RTC ruling ===
In 2011, the Pasig Regional Trial Court made permanent the 1994 Writ of Preliminary Injunction that stated the entire Fort Bonifacio Military Reservation (including the Embo barangays), consisting of Parcels 3 and 4, Psu-2031, is confirmed to be part of the territory of the City of Taguig. The ruling prevented the Department of Environment and Natural Resources (DENR) and the Land Management Bureau from disposing of, executing deeds of conveyances over, issuing titles, over the lots covered by Proclamation Nos. 2475 and 518. It also ordered the City of Makati to refrain exercising jurisdiction, making improvements on, and from treating as part of its territory the Fort Bonifacio Military Reservation.

=== Further rulings and appeals ===
The City of Makati appealed the 2011 Pasig RTC ruling to the Court of Appeals. On August 5, 2013, after a year and a half of deliberations, it was decided in a 37-page decision written by Justice Marlene Gonzales-Sison of the Court of Appeals that the jurisdiction over Fort Bonifacio has reverted to Makati from Taguig. The court upheld the constitutionality of Presidential Proclamation Nos. 2475 and 518, both of which confirmed that portions of the aforementioned military camps are under the jurisdiction of Makati. The decision also cited the fact that voters from the barangays that are subject to the dispute between Makati and Taguig have long been registered as voters of Makati, thus bolstering the former's jurisdiction over Fort Bonifacio. Taguig Mayor Lani Cayetano, however, maintained that this decision was not yet final and executory, and asked Justice Gonzales-Sison to recuse herself from the case as it was discovered that her family has close ties with the Binays of Makati.

On August 22, 2013, the Taguig city government filed a motion for reconsideration before the Court of Appeals' Sixth Division, affirming its claim on Fort Bonifacio. With the filing of the motion, Taguig asserted jurisdiction over Fort Bonifacio. According to Taguig's legal department, jurisprudence, and the rules of procedure in the country's justice system, all say that the filing of a motion for reconsideration suspends the execution of a decision and puts it in limbo. On June 15, 2016, in a 27-page decision by the Second Division of the Supreme Court, the court found Makati guilty of direct contempt for forum shopping.

On October 3, 2017, the Court of Appeals upheld its final decision in favor of the city government of Taguig and not Makati. The Supreme Court also found Makati guilty of forum shopping after simultaneously appealing the Pasig Regional Trial Court (RTC) ruling and filing a petition before the Court of Appeals, both seeking the same relief. However, Makati maintained its claim over the disputed area.

=== Result ===
In a decision released on April 27, 2022, the Supreme Court made permanent the 1994 Writ of Preliminary Injunction that Makati shall refrain from exercising jurisdiction over, making improvements on, or otherwise treating as part of its territory the Fort Bonifacio Military Reservation. It also upheld the 2011 Pasig RTC ruling that declared that the 729 hectares (1,800 acres) Bonifacio Global City, along with several surrounding barangays of Makati (Pembo, Comembo, Cembo, South Cembo, West Rembo, East Rembo, and Pitogo), was under the jurisdiction of Taguig. However, Makati released a statement saying that it would continue exercising jurisdiction over areas it controlled until it received an official copy of the decision.

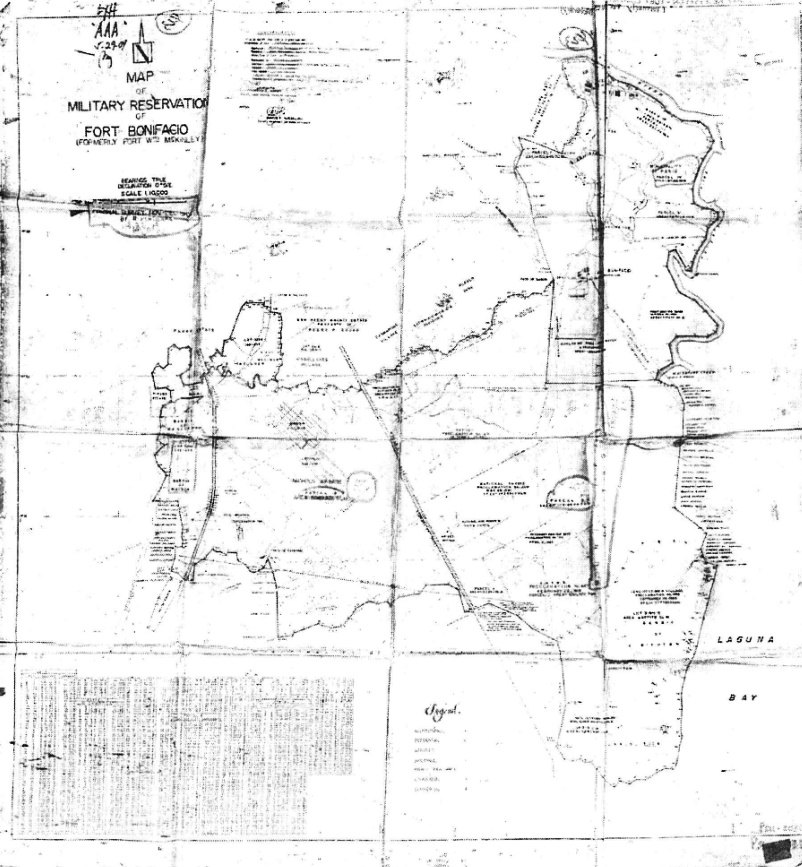
The 1909 Survey Plan of Psu-2031, which illustrates the extent of the Military Reservation of Fort Bonifacio (formerly Fort McKinley), was presented by Taguig as evidence to support their claims.

On April 3, 2023, the Supreme Court junked the motion for reconsideration that was filed by Makati to override the court's earlier decision, siding with Taguig. The city government of Taguig released a statement "welcoming the new Taguigeños", referring to the residents of the affected barangays, and saying that the Taguig LGU will start working on the transition and handover of such barangays.

=== Makati appeal attempt ===
Makati Mayor Abigail Binay claimed that the dispute is "not yet over", stating that her office has received a notice that the Supreme Court has set its case with Taguig for oral arguments. This was contradicted by Supreme Court spokesperson Brian Keith Hosaka, who stated that there are no such documents.

The Taguig City Government slammed Binay's comment and also expressed belief that her meeting with President Bongbong Marcos, First Lady Liza Araneta Marcos and Chief Justice Alexander Gesmundo was meant to "undermine the probity of our highest officials and subvert the people's trust in the impartiality of justice". Taguig's mayor sought sanctions against Binay for the statement.

On June 29, 2023, the SC rejected Makati's motion to file a second appeal, saying that it is generally prohibited under their rules. It also said its en banc "is not an appellate court" and will not entertain further pleadings in the case. Makati's had filed an earlier motion for reconsideration, which was rejected in 2022.

On October 5, 2023, Makati City Mayor Abigail Binay filed a motion for clarification with the petition for the issuance of a status quo ante order before the Taguig City Court Branch 153 to facilitate the proper transition of territory. This is the same court where the Taguig-Makati land row started, which was eventually resolved by the Supreme Court in favor of Taguig. The petition came after Taguig and Makati engaged in a dispute over schools and health facilities in Embo barangays, prompting national agencies to intervene.

With a decision penned on May 28, 2025, The Court of Appeals' Third Division dismissed Makati's petition to reverse Taguig RTC Branch 153's denial of its status quo ante order and urgent motion for clarification released in December 2023 and February 2024. In its decision, the Court of Appeals ruled that a writ of execution was unnecessary to enforce the final and executory ruling of the Supreme Court that favors Taguig.

== Aftermath and transition ==
Taguig issued a statement welcoming the ten Embo barangays to its jurisdiction. Meanwhile, Makati Mayor Abigail Binay conceded defeat after the Supreme Court denied Makati's second appeal. Taguig proposed the formation of a joint transition body and later conducted a meeting with officials of the affected barangays for transition. Makati also suggested holding a plebiscite covering the contested area if both city governments agree. Public facilities such as schools, barangay halls, community centers, sports facilities, became subject to ownership dispute since Taguig claims ownership of the said properties on the grounds of the Makati's unlawful possession, while Makati maintains that it is still the rightful owner of the land and facilities therein since the ruling did not consider ownership of the facilities. Both city governments have engaged in a series of feuds with regard to the transition.

Initial reactions from the residents of the Embo barangays about the Supreme Court ruling are negative. As a response to the ruling, some residents launched a series of motorcade protests. The first motorcade protest was held on August 20, 2023, followed by three more on August 27, 2023, November 5, 2023, and January 30, 2024.

Students studying at the University of Makati and other Embo public schools, as well as residents served by the Ospital ng Makati who are beneficiaries of Makati's social programs, are affected. Taguig would extend its scholarship program to residents of the formerly disputed area. Mayor Binay, on the other hand, pledged to continue to provide assistance to residents in the area. She claimed that Taguig would not be able to do so immediately, noting that its scholarship program has a residency requirement.

The Department of Budget and Management (DBM) reminded various government agencies to comply with the SC ruling with regard to budget planning and allocation.

=== Transfer of local government ===
The Department of the Interior and Local Government (DILG) ordered the transfer of the ten Embo barangays, formerly under Makati, to the jurisdiction of its Taguig field office, through a memorandum circular dated October 26, 2023. Meanwhile, the DILG National Capital Region was ordered to furnish reports to DILG Taguig of the ten barangays on the conduct of line inventory and turnover of the Barangay and Sangguniang Kabataan properties, financial records, documents and money accountabilities.

Makati has excluded the ten barangays from its national tax allotment (NTA) beginning fiscal year 2024, transferring them to Taguig by virtue of a memorandum issued by the Department of Budget and Management (DBM) dated December 28, 2023. Makati Mayor Abigail Binay stated that the city expects big savings following the transfer of the ten barangays to Taguig, with 23 remaining barangays in Makati receiving ₱10.085 million each from the city's basic real property tax collection (RPT) for the fiscal year 2024.

=== Electorate ===
==== Barangay and Sangguniang Kabataan ====
Ahead of the Barangay and Sangguniang Kabataan Elections (BSKE) held in October 2023, the COMELEC transferred the ten Embo barangays to Taguig. The DILG has instructed both the cities of Makati and Taguig to assist COMELEC regarding the upcoming BSKE. COMELEC has also instructed the Office of the Election Officer (OEO) of both Taguig and Makati (second district) to prepare a new list of qualified electoral boards, to print new voter's list reflecting the change to Taguig, and to ensure that voting centers would be available. Voters in the affected barangays were automatically transferred to Taguig.

On November 12, newly elected Sangguniang Kabataan (SK) officials from the Embo barangays, along with other newly elected barangay and SK officials from Taguig, took their oath before Taguig Mayor Lani Cayetano at Marquis Events Place in Bonifacio Global City. However, on November 25, newly elected barangay officials and SK chairpersons from the Embo barangays opted to take their oath before Makati Mayor Abigail Binay at the Makati City Hall.

==== Local election ====
On June 28, 2024, the COMELEC formally listed the 10 Embo barangays to be under Taguig, thereby making them eligible to vote in the 2025 local elections, for mayor, vice mayor, and city council, but initially not for the congressman (district representative) position. Due to the disenfranchisement of Embo residents, the COMELEC was informed by the Taguig City Council of plans to pass a resolution reallocating the Embo barangays between Taguig's two existing legislative districts, adding four councilors per district for a total of 24 elective seats. This process culminated with the passage of Ordinance No. 144 on September 16, followed by Senate and House Concurrent Resolutions and COMELEC Resolution No. 11069 dated September 25, officially allowing Embo residents vote for a congressman for Taguig.

=== Representation in the Congress ===
Legislative districts of Taguig and Makati

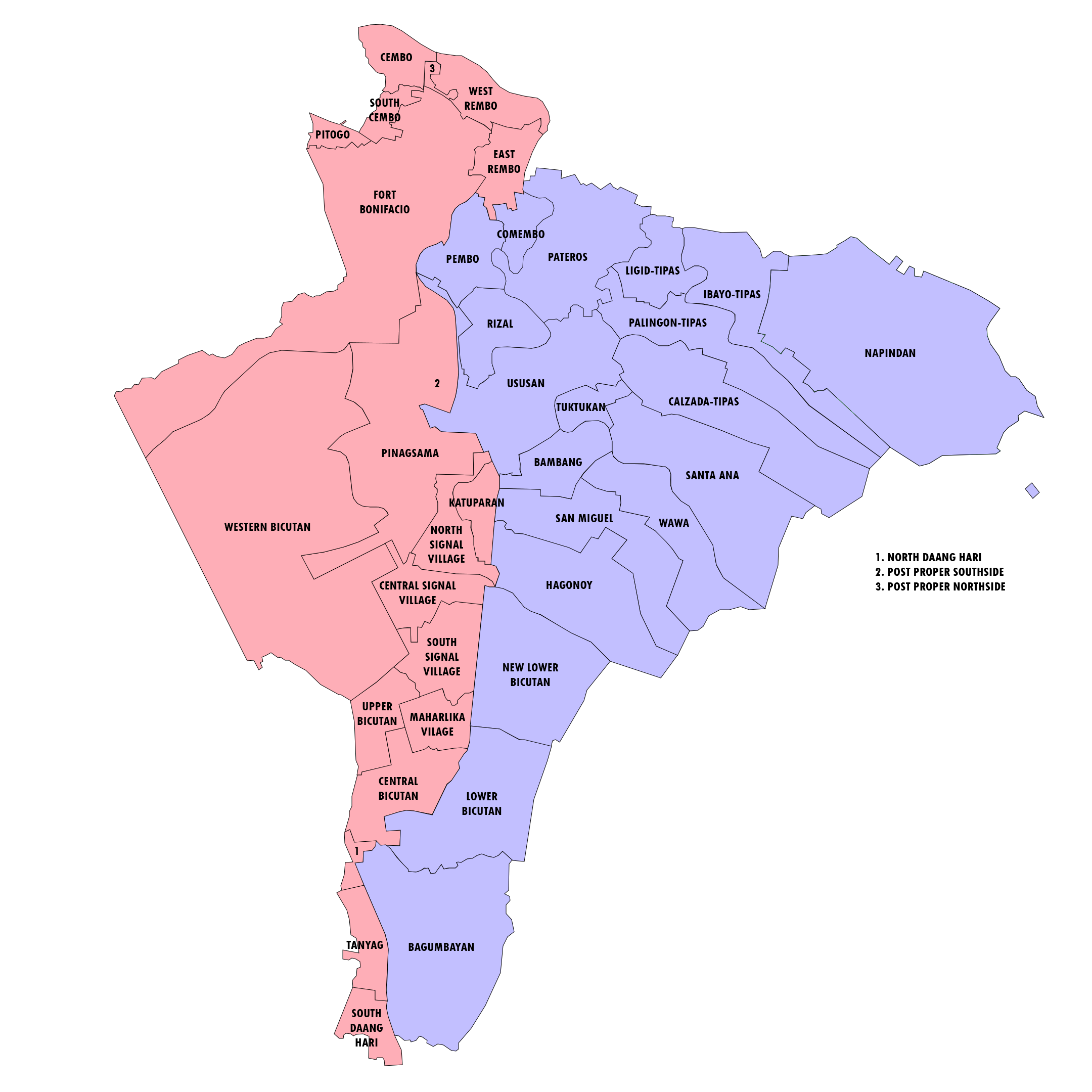
Legislative districts of the combined representation of Taguig–Pateros with the inclusion of the Embo barangays
Pateros–Taguig (District I)
Taguig (District II)

Map of Makati's 2nd congressional district with Embo barangays ceded to Taguig in light red and the remaining non-contested barangays in red.

With the ruling, the fate of Makati's 2nd district, which covered the Embo barangays and the non-contested barangays of Guadalupe Nuevo, Guadalupe Viejo, and Pinagkaisahan, is uncertain. The remaining barangays in Makati does not satisfy the constitutional requirement of having at least 250,000 residents to be represented by a congressional district. With this development, Makati may be reduced to a single district, with the Embo barangays potentially forming the third district of Taguig or being absorbed into the two existing districts. Legislation and plebiscite would be still required.

Makati's 2nd district is expected to remain despite not fulfilling the population constitutional requirements even with three barangays. However, beginning in 2025, voters from the Embo barangays will not be able to vote for this district's representative to the House of Representatives, as legislation should be passed to revise Taguig's legislative districts to include them.

On September 14, 2024, the Taguig City Council commenced its committee hearings on a proposed ordinance incorporating the Embo barangays into Taguig's two existing districts and increase the number of elected councilors in each district from 8 to 12, totaling 24. It was later enacted as Taguig City Ordinance No. 144 on September 16. Subsequently, Senator Alan Peter Cayetano adopted Senate Concurrent resolution No. 23 on September 23, followed by the House of Representatives adopting House Concurrent Resolution No. 37 on September 25. Both Senate and House of Representatives also adopted Concurrent Resolution No. 26. On September 27, the Commission on Elections (COMELEC) announced that they had adopted the Senate resolution as COMELEC Resolution No. 11069, allowing voters from the Embo barangays to vote for a district representative for Taguig in 2025. With this, barangays Comembo, Pembo, and Rizal will be included to the 1st district, while barangays Cembo, East Rembo, Pitogo, Post Proper Northside, Post Proper Southside, South Cembo, and West Rembo will be included to the 2nd district.

On October 28, 2024, retired Associate Justice and former Taguig–Pateros representative Dante Tiñga filed certiorari and temporary restraining order petitions with the Supreme Court, questioning the constitutionality of Taguig City Ordinance No. 144. He also sought the nullification of COMELEC Resolution No. 11069 and Concurrent Resolution No. 26 of the Senate and House of Representatives.

=== Ownership of public properties ===
==== Background ====
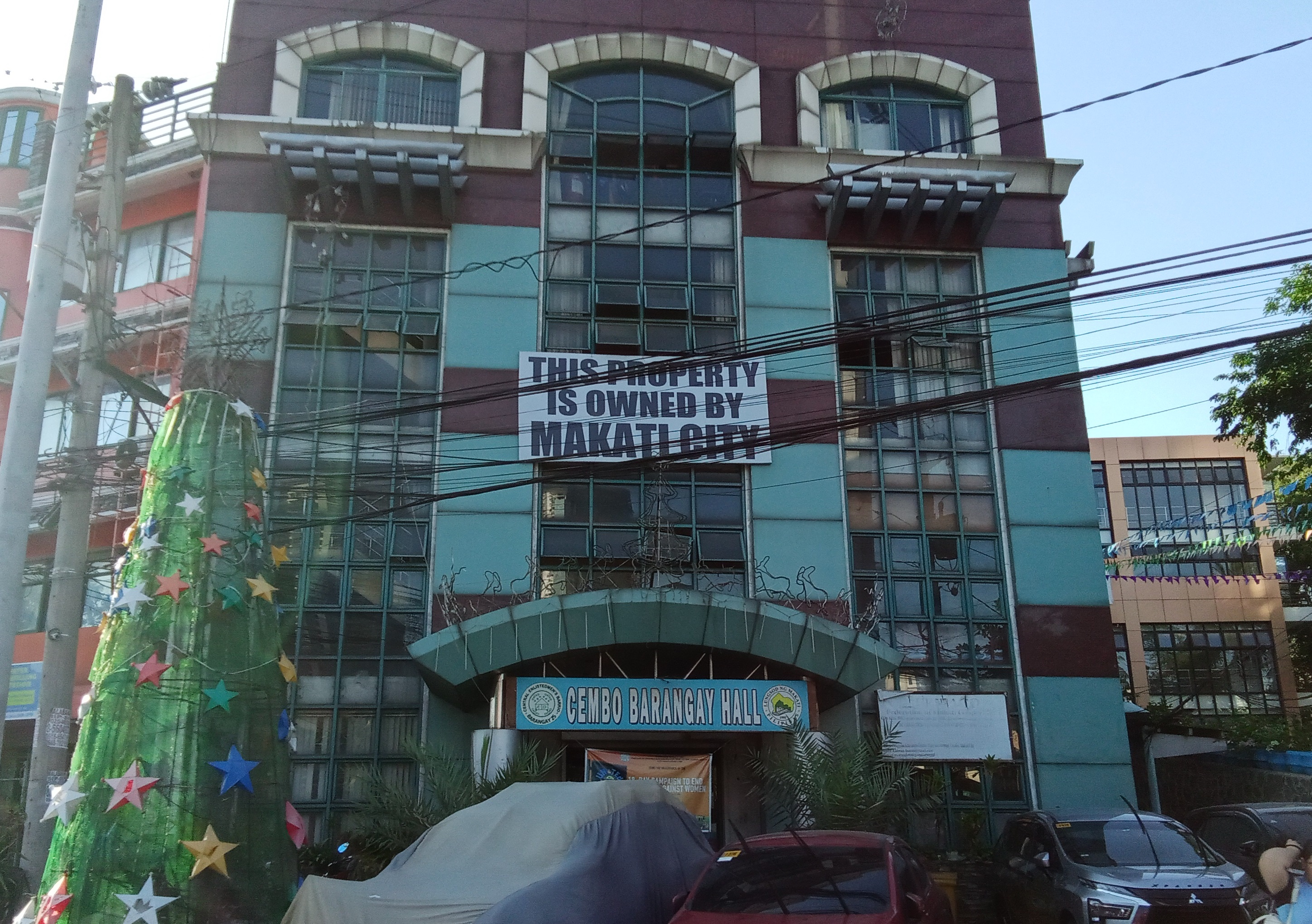
The Cembo barangay hall with a Makati ownership banner, pictured in April 2024. Taguig started to take over the public schools on August 11, 2023, prompting Makati to put up banners in all of its properties in Embo a few days later.

Due to the nature of the case, the Supreme Court decision favoring Taguig in the territorial dispute does not take into consideration the properties built in the Embo barangays using Makati funds. An injunction was issued by the court in 1994 to Makati so that the city will refrain from building on government lands as long as the case is ongoing. However, Makati asserted that the properties have been awarded by the national government through Proclamation No. 1916, which was signed on October 14, 2009, by President Gloria Macapagal Arroyo. However, subsequent Proclamations after 1994 that granted properties, land and other benefits to Makati in the area could be assailed or invalidated for the same faulty assumption as the 1986 Marcos proclamation. In line with the principle that accessory follows the principal, Justice Secretary Jesus Crispin Remulla stated in a three-page legal opinion dated August 29, 2024, that buildings and structures located within Embo naturally falls within Taguig's jurisdiction. However, the Department of Justice could not conclusively determine whether Makati's health centers are obliged to pay reimbursements or rent to Taguig until the source of funds for their construction is clearly determined.

If Makati insists on ownership and continues to deprive the Embo citizens of public facilities, they can be considered as builders in bad faith, and Taguig, as rightful owner of the land, is entitled to remedies to rectify this. If the lands are titled to Makati, they are subject to the property, tax, business, and zoning laws of Taguig, and if untitled, Makati is basically squatting on Taguig lands. The transfer of registry records will be the solution to this conundrum. The case is similar to the 1989 and 2001 Camarines Norte vs. Quezon territorial dispute, in which the Supreme Court ruled in favor of Santa Elena, Camarines Norte, over Calauag, Quezon. The municipality was able to gain most of the government properties in the disputed barangays like barangay halls, schools, covered courts without the need for the writ of execution.

On April 1, 2024, Makati announced that it filed a complaint with the Office of the Ombudsman against three Taguig city government employees, including the treasurer Voltaire Enriquez, for alleged graft, corruption, and neglect of duty. This stemmed from an alleged delay since May 2023 by the treasurer's office in releasing tax clearance documents for three parcels of land acquired by Makati from the Bases Conversion and Development Authority. Taguig denounced Makati's actions as "harassment."

Additionally, in September 2023, the construction of the Makati Intra-city Subway was stalled for a required reworking, as its planned depot and some stations were initially intended to be located in the formerly disputed area. It was later cancelled on May 2, 2025, following the withdrawal of Philippine Infradev Holdings, Inc. as Makati's private partner for the project.

==== Makati Park and Garden standoff ====
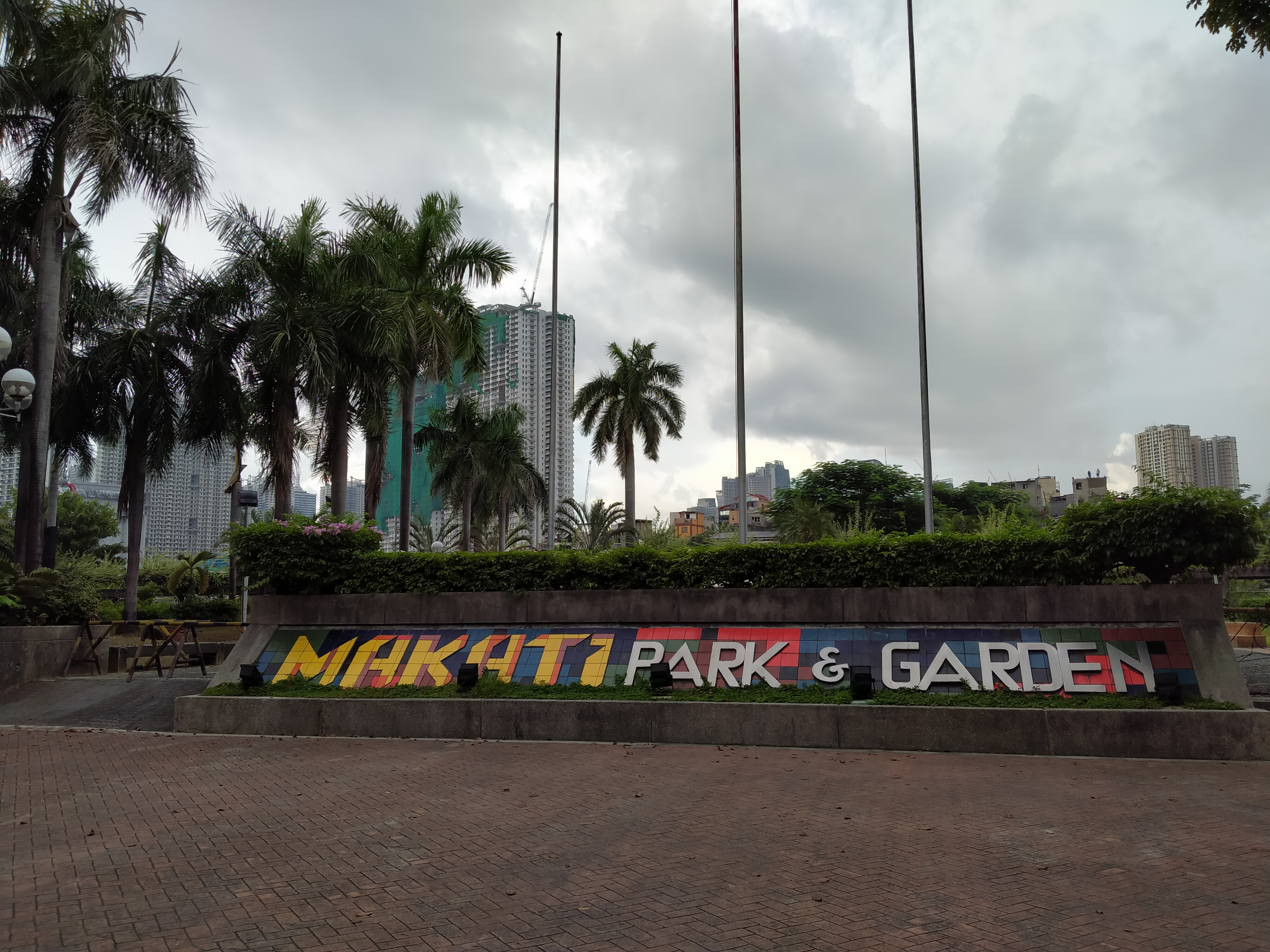
The Makati Park and Garden is one of the Makati-developed public property affected by the dispute ruling. A standoff occurred here in March 2024 and the park was formally put under Taguig's control as the Taguig People's Park in May 2025 by virtue of a court order.

On March 1, 2024, Taguig TMO members attempted to seize control of the then-Makati Park and Garden but was prevented by the Makati Public Safety Department (PSD). Taguig later closed the park and the adjacent Makati Aqua Sports Arena (MASA) on March 3, 2024, citing lack of permits. However, Makati contended that the closure order did not include MASA and also accused Taguig of continuously land-grabbing their facilities. It also argued against needing permits or paying taxes to Taguig, citing Presidential Proclamation No. 1916 series of 2009. The closure of MASA affected 4,400 Makati public school students who use it for their swimming lessons. Taguig, for its part, cited that under the Local Government Code, it is authorized to regulate any business, trade, and activity within its jurisdiction, and it cited Makati's "unlawful possession" of the park.

During the park's attempted takeover and closure, Makati city government employees were reportedly trapped inside the park and in MASA, respectively. The incident led to the filing of illegal detention cases against Taguig officials led by Mayor Lani Cayetano before the Taguig City Prosecutor's Office. The Taguig city government later refuted the accusations as false and labeled Makati a bully as well, denouncing its closures as "illegal and immoral." The illegal detention charges were later dismissed due to lack of evidence.

In May 2025, the park was reopened by the City of Taguig and was rechristened as the "Taguig People's Park", following the city's takeover of public properties in accordance to court order that allows Taguig to exclusively possess government properties in the Embo barangays.

==== Possession of public properties ====
On May 5, 2025, the Regional Trial Court (RTC) of Taguig issued a 72-hour Temporary Restraining Order (TRO) directing the City of Makati to immediately cease obstructing the City of Taguig's access to and exclusive full possession of public properties in the Embo barangays covered by Proclamation Nos. 518 and 1916. The TRO covers health centers, multi-purpose buildings, day care centers, barangay halls, covered courts, parks and other government properties. Upon possession, Taguig reopened all facilities covered by the TRO the following day for the benefit and enjoyment of the public. The TRO was given a 17-day extension on May 9. Before the TRO extension expires, the court granted Taguig's prayer for preliminary injunction, which effectively retains Taguig's control of the facilities for the continued public services for the Embo barangays.

=== Court jurisdiction ===
By virtue of Administrative Matter No. 23-10-01-SC dated December 5, 2023, the Supreme Court of the Philippines is set to transfer the jurisdiction of civil and criminal cases committed within the Embo barangays from Makati courts to Taguig courts effective January 1, 2024. It also named seven Makati courts and four Metropolitan Trial Courts to assist their Taguig counterparts, which are pending an increase in numbers.

In response to the jurisdictional change, Taguig–Pateros 1st district Representative Ading Cruz filed legislation seeking to create ten additional Regional Trial Court branches and five Metropolitan Trial Court branches in Taguig. The measure was originally introduced as House Bill No. 10378 on May 8, 2024, but remained pending through the end of the 19th Congress. It was subsequently re-filed for the 20th Congress as House Bill No. 1974 on July 16, 2025 and remains pending with the House Committee of Justice as of July 30, 2025.

=== Businesses and real property ===
In November 2023, business establishments in the Embo barangays are now advised to register in Taguig. The local government of Taguig would accommodate and process the replacement of Makati business permits. In the same month, land owners in the Embo barangays are now advised to pay real property tax in Taguig. The Land Registration Authority (LRA) issued an order, dated January 1, 2024, to transfer all transactions related to the properties in the Embo barangays from Makati's Registry of Deeds to Taguig's Registry of Deeds.

=== Emergency services ===
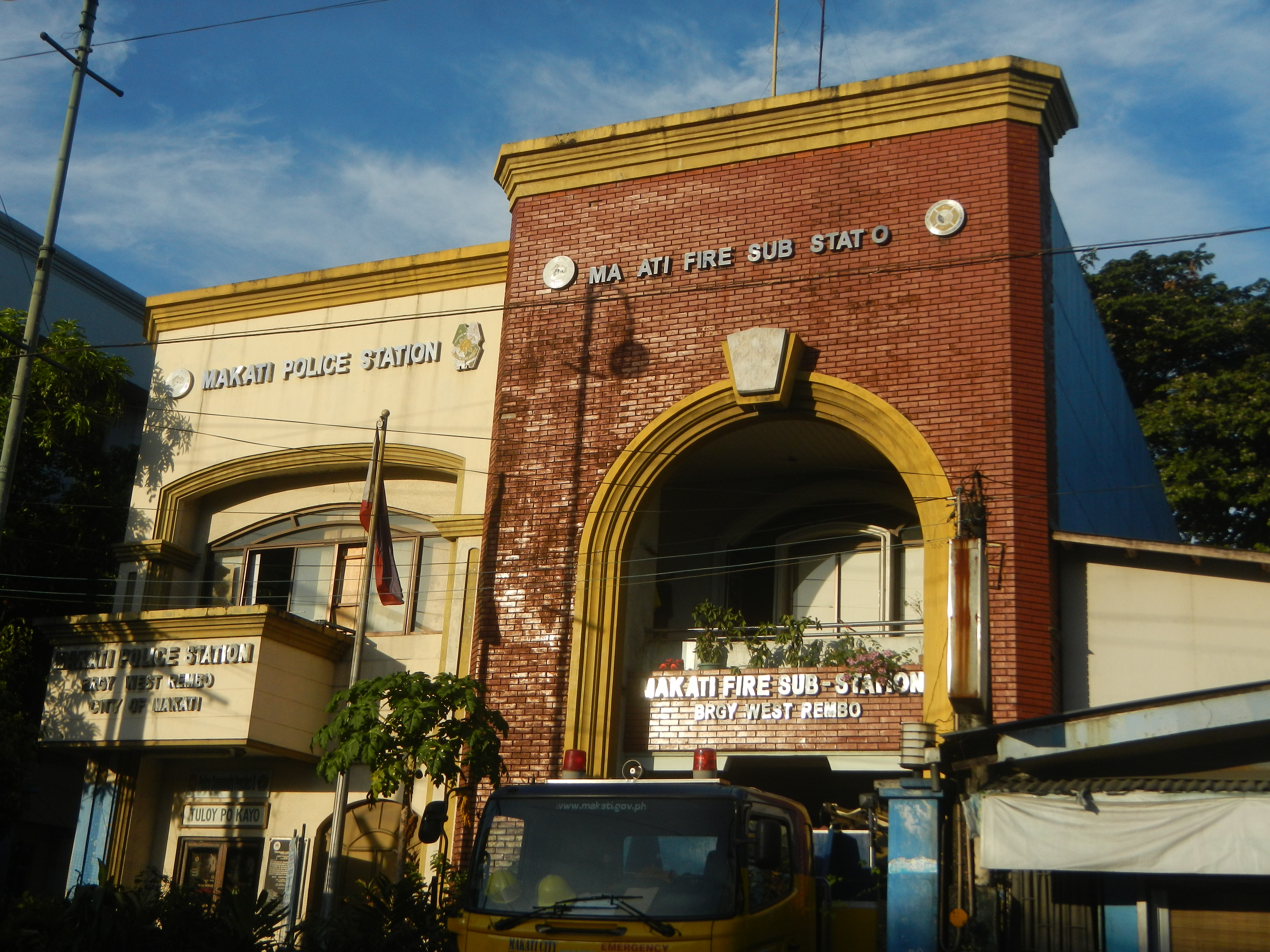
West Rembo Police and Fire Sub-Station are among those affected by the dispute.

In August 2023, the Philippine National Police has started preparations to realign its police forces in the Embo barangays. According to its initial plan, incumbent police officers assigned in the area would remain but would be turned over from Makati Central Police Station to Taguig Central Police Station.

On November 29, 2023, Makati City Government recalled old ambulances deployed to barangay Comembo for battery replacement and subsequent repairs lasting until January 2024. They claimed repairs were necessary before returning them to their donor, the Department of Health (DOH), as per terms in the Deed of Donation executed in September 2021. In January 2024, another Comembo ambulance was temporarily recalled for inventory and licensing until it was redeployed on February 8. An ambulance was also transferred from barangay Rizal to Guadalupe Nuevo due to the former's proximity to Ospital ng Makati shared with Comembo. However, the Taguig City Government accused Makati of "summarily pulling out" those old ambulances while announcing the turnover of new ambulances to Comembo and Rizal on February 11, 2024. Makati insisted that an official Notice of Revocation is required before handing them to Taguig.

Fire substations in the Embo barangays were initially closed down by the Makati City Government, but were later reopened on January 5, 2024, by the DILG, which assumed direct supervision. National government-owned fire equipment would be supplied to the substations and Taguig firefighters would be stationed there. The decision to close the substations drew criticism from Senator Alan Peter Cayetano, husband of Taguig Mayor Lani Cayetano.

=== Administration of schools ===
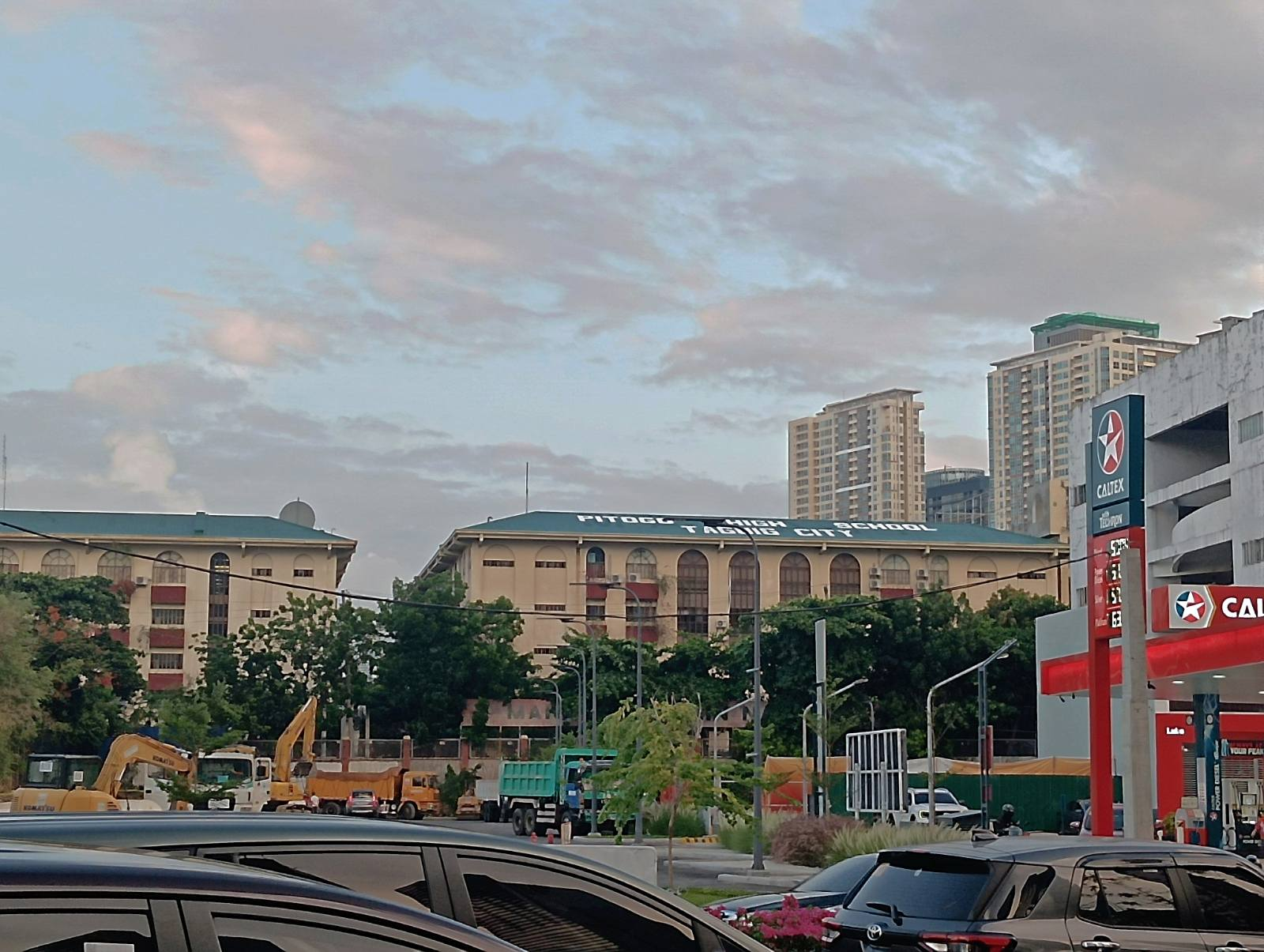
Pitogo High School bearing the word "Taguig City" on its roof, reflecting Taguig's possession and political jurisdiction over barangay Pitogo and the school's new administration under the Schools Division Office of Taguig and Pateros.

The Regional Office of the Department of Education–National Capital Region has issued a memorandum ordering the transfer of the affected 14 Embo public elementary and high schools from the Schools Division Office (SDO) of Makati City to the Schools Division Office of Taguig City and Pateros. A meeting was held between the officials of the SDO of Taguig City and Pateros, local officials of Taguig, and the principals of the affected Embo public schools and tackled that Taguig is ready for the opening of classes in the affected schools on August 29, 2023.

The schools would be later placed under the direct supervision of the national Department of Education as tensions arose between the two cities regarding the ownership, management and administration of the schools. Meanwhile, the Makati City Government stated that it is willing to lease 11 out of 14 public schools in the Embo area, in an effort to reinforce their claim on the properties. Transfer of management, operations and administration of the 14 affected schools from Makati to Taguig was expedited, completing it by January 1, 2024, when those were finally placed under the supervision of Taguig City's SDO.

The Makati City Government later appealed to the DepEd to retain Makati Science High School, Fort Bonifacio Elementary School, and Fort Bonifacio High School under the SDO of Makati City and to integrate both Fort Bonifacio-named schools with the adjacent University of Makati, owned by the city government, as laboratory schools. However, in July 2024, their request was denied by the department, citing a lack of legal basis and justification. DepEd Undersecretary Revsee Escobedo cited that granting the request would violate the Supreme Court ruling, the Constitution, and the Basic Education Act of 2001, which mandates that basic education governance is a responsibility of the national government.

Additionally, starting from the academic year 2024–2025, students from the Embo barangays enrolled at the University of Makati would be reclassified as non-Makati residents. The waived tuition fees exclusively for Makati residents remained in place for them for the remainder of the academic year 2023–2024.

=== Daycare centers ===
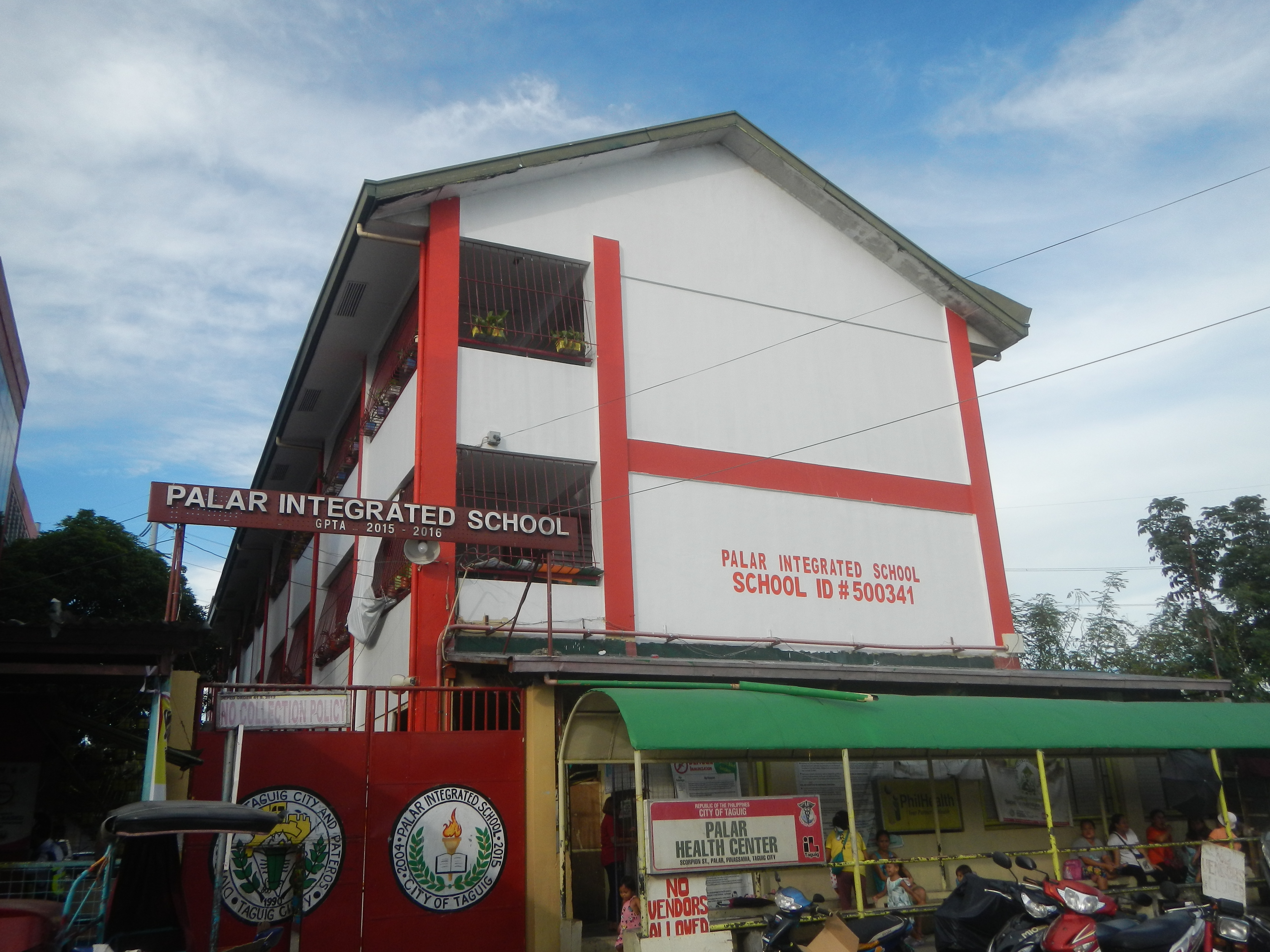
Palar Integrated School in Pinagsama is designated by Taguig as the temporary location of two Post Proper Southside daycare centers.

Originally scheduled to close on December 31, 2023, the Makati City Government decided to extend the operations of daycare centers in the Embo barangays until they were closed on January 31, 2024. On February 1, 2024, the Taguig City Government designated the nearest public elementary schools as temporary daycare centers, while new daycare centers are being set up in the barangays. Free transportation services will also be provided for daycare students living far away from the daycare centers.

Taguig, on a statement dated February 1, 2024, criticized Makati for shutting down the daycare centers without prior notice and allegedly removing daycare equipment. As a response, Makati City Administrator Claro Certeza stated that Taguig officials were already informed about the closure but chose to blame Makati for their lack of action. He argued that Taguig violated the memorandum of agreement signed with the DepEd in such designation of public elementary schools as temporary daycare centers, asserting that daycare centers are not within the scope of the DepEd. Taguig later refuted claims of receiving prior notice from Makati and asserted that Makati did not coordinate with them.

=== Healthcare ===
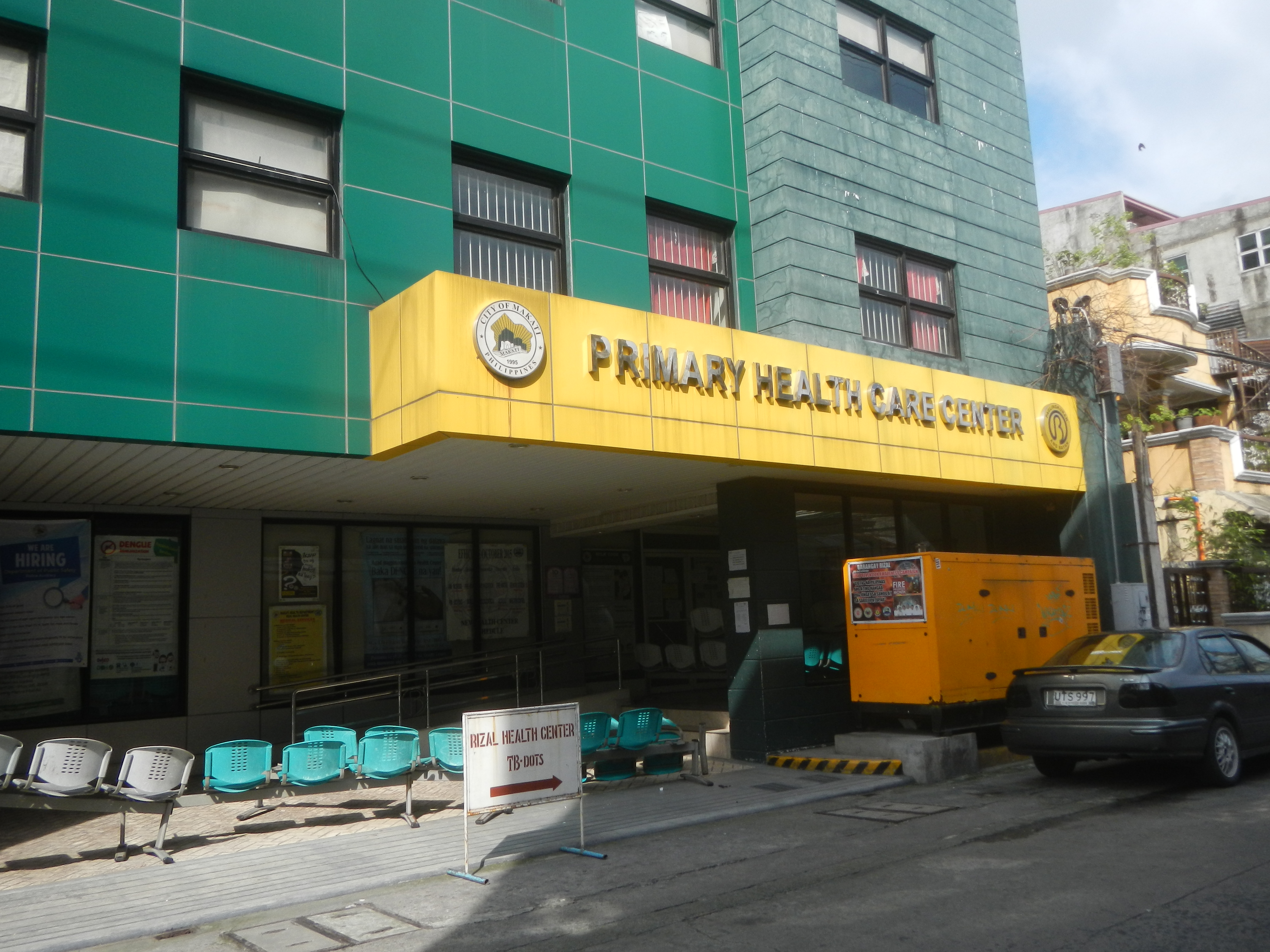
Rizal Health Center, located inside the Primary Health Care Center, is among the healthcare facilities affected by the dispute.

On September 25, 2023, Makati City Administrator Claro Certeza alleged that the Taguig City Government rejected the deals regarding the transfer of 8 health centers, the Ospital ng Makati, and patient data in the areas affected by the territorial dispute between the cities. The Makati City Government proposed a credit line for Taguig and offered Taguig the option to lease or purchase the facilities it built on the contested areas. However, Taguig countered the proposed deals and memorandums with Makati, asserting that the Makati City Government is acting on bad faith and their proposed deals were founded on the baseless claim that Makati owns the land and the health centers erected on it. Taguig also accused Makati of violating the agreement with the Department of Health (DOH), which stated that both Taguig and Makati shall not take up ownership of existing land and buildings while the transition discussions are ongoing.

On January 1, 2024, the Makati City Government announced the discontinuation of Yellow Card benefits, which includes healthcare subsidies, for Embo residents (excluding city employees), and closed down health centers and lying-in clinics in Embo due to expired licenses. On January 3, the Taguig City Government stepped in by providing free teleconsultation, free dialysis, and personal medical consultation in its health centers to Embo residents and designated catchment health centers for them in Fort Bonifacio, Pinagsama, and Ususan. It later opened its new satellite pharmacy in East Rembo for them on January 5. Additional services like Home Health for bedridden patients and Doctor on Call were made available to Embo residents on January 11. Makati also announced that the Ospital ng Makati offers free consultations to Embo outpatients, with laboratory services free for senior citizens aged 60 and above. Residents of the Embo barangays still have access to free consultations at health centers in Makati, as well as Lingkod Bayan Caravan, the city government's health caravan.

In early January 2024, the Taguig City Government claimed that Makati declined to turn over the facilities and also accused it for "deceit and fraud" in closing down the health centers in the Embo barangays. In response, Makati said that Taguig had long been aware of the situation before the announcement but didn't act upon it. As a result, the DILG invited Mayors Binay and Cayetano and the DOH for a meeting over such closures. During a DOH budget hearing at the Senate on November 19, 2024, Senator Alan Peter Cayetano criticized Health Secretary Ted Herbosa for not addressing such closures, which missed the turnover deadline on September 1, 2024, and likened him to Pontius Pilate for avoiding responsibility. While Taguig's alternative healthcare services exist, Herbosa claimed that the department's Medical Assistance to Indigent Patients (MAIP) covered the needs of Embo residents. On May 7, 2025, health centers in Embo were reopened a day after they were taken over by Taguig.

=== Social welfare ===
On September 28, 2023, the residents of the Embo barangays are now eligible to receive scholarships from the Taguig City Government. The city said it received 5,000 scholarship applications, with 387 recipients already receiving their cash allowance within the first two days. Taguig also started giving out cash gifts to senior citizens of the Embo barangays.

In late 2023, the Taguig City Government began distributing its annual Pamaskong Handog (lit. transl. Christmas Gift) bags, containing grocery items, to the residents of Embo barangays in anticipation of Christmas, although the Makati City Government continued distributing their Pamaskong Handog bags to such residents until that year. Makati also provided free rides to them for Ayala Avenue New Year's Eve Countdown to 2024: A Grand Showcase of Filipino Talent, a New Year's Eve street party held in the Makati Central Business District, with six pick-up and drop-off points in the area.

On January 1, 2024, the Makati City Government discontinued the benefits and incentives of the Blu Cards of senior citizens in the Embo barangays, while clarifying that their Makatizen card may still be used as a debit card and valid ID. Weeks later, it announced that the Solo Parent Cards that it issued to single parents from the Embo barangays are no longer valid.

=== Postal codes ===
Effective February 2024, the Philippine Postal Corporation (PHLPOST) assigned the range of 1640 to 1649 as the new ZIP codes to the Embo barangays now part of Taguig. The range replaced 1214 to 1218, left Pinagkaisahan in Makati as the only barangay under 1213, and deconsolidated the Inner Fort (Post Proper) barangays from 1200 of the Makati Central Post Office (CPO).

ZIP codes of Embo barangays
Barangay	New	Old
Cembo	1640	1214 (Note: ZIP code of Cembo shared with South Cembo, which was part of the barangay until separation in 1966)
Comembo	1641	1217
Pembo	1642	1218 (Note: ZIP code of Pembo shared with Rizal, which was part of the barangay until separation in 1996)
East Rembo	1643	1216
West Rembo	1644	1215
South Cembo	1645	1214
Pitogo	1646	1213 (Note: ZIP code shared with Pinagkaisahan, Makati)
Post Proper Northside	1647	1200 (Note: ZIP code of Makati CPO and Buendia Avenue (Makati segment only), where the Inner Fort (Post Proper) barangays were consolidated)
Post Proper Southside	1648	1200
Rizal	1649	1218

=== Road and traffic management ===
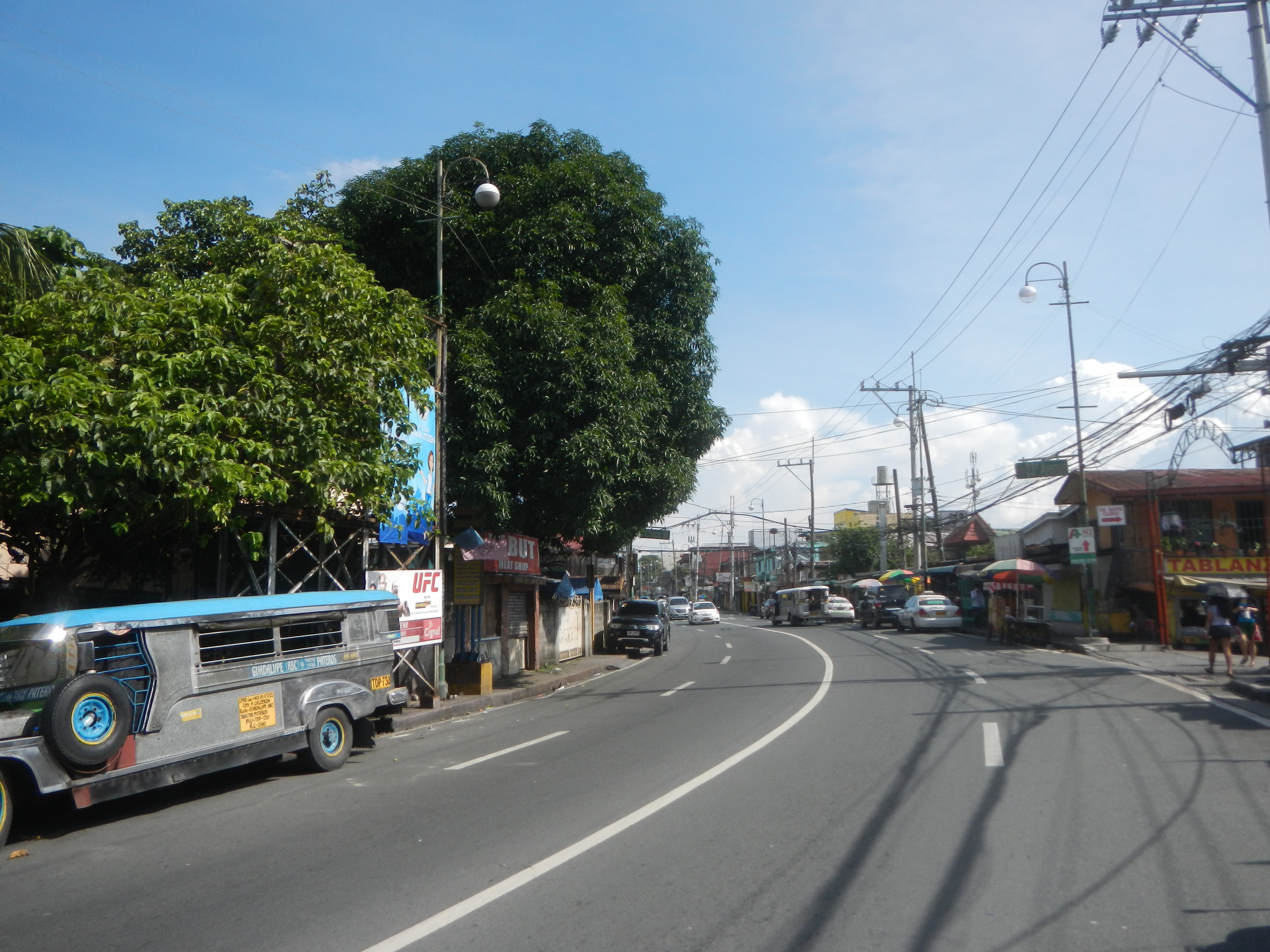
The section of J.P. Rizal Avenue passing through the Embo barangays is now included in Taguig's exemption from the MMDA's expanded number coding scheme and is now under the jurisdiction of DPWH Metro Manila 1st District Engineering Office.

As of November 14, 2023, the Embo barangays were placed under the jurisdiction of Taguig's Traffic Management Office (TMO). Consequently, the area is now covered by the exemption under the expanded number coding scheme by the Metro Manila Development Authority (MMDA) that is also applied in Taguig, having been previously under Makati's full number coding scheme (Monday to Friday, 7:00 am to 7:00 pm PHT). However, the MMDA's coding scheme (Monday to Friday, 7:00 am to 10:00 am and 5:00 pm to 8:00 pm PHT) is still enforced on Circumferential Road 5 (C-5), which traverses the formerly disputed area. Both schemes are not implemented on holidays.

The national roads in the Embo barangays were now under the jurisdiction of the Department of Public Works and Highways (DPWH) – Metro Manila 1st District Engineering Office which covers the whole of Taguig. Formerly, these roads were under the Metro Manila 2nd District Engineering Office which manages national roads in Makati.

=== Religious jurisdiction ===
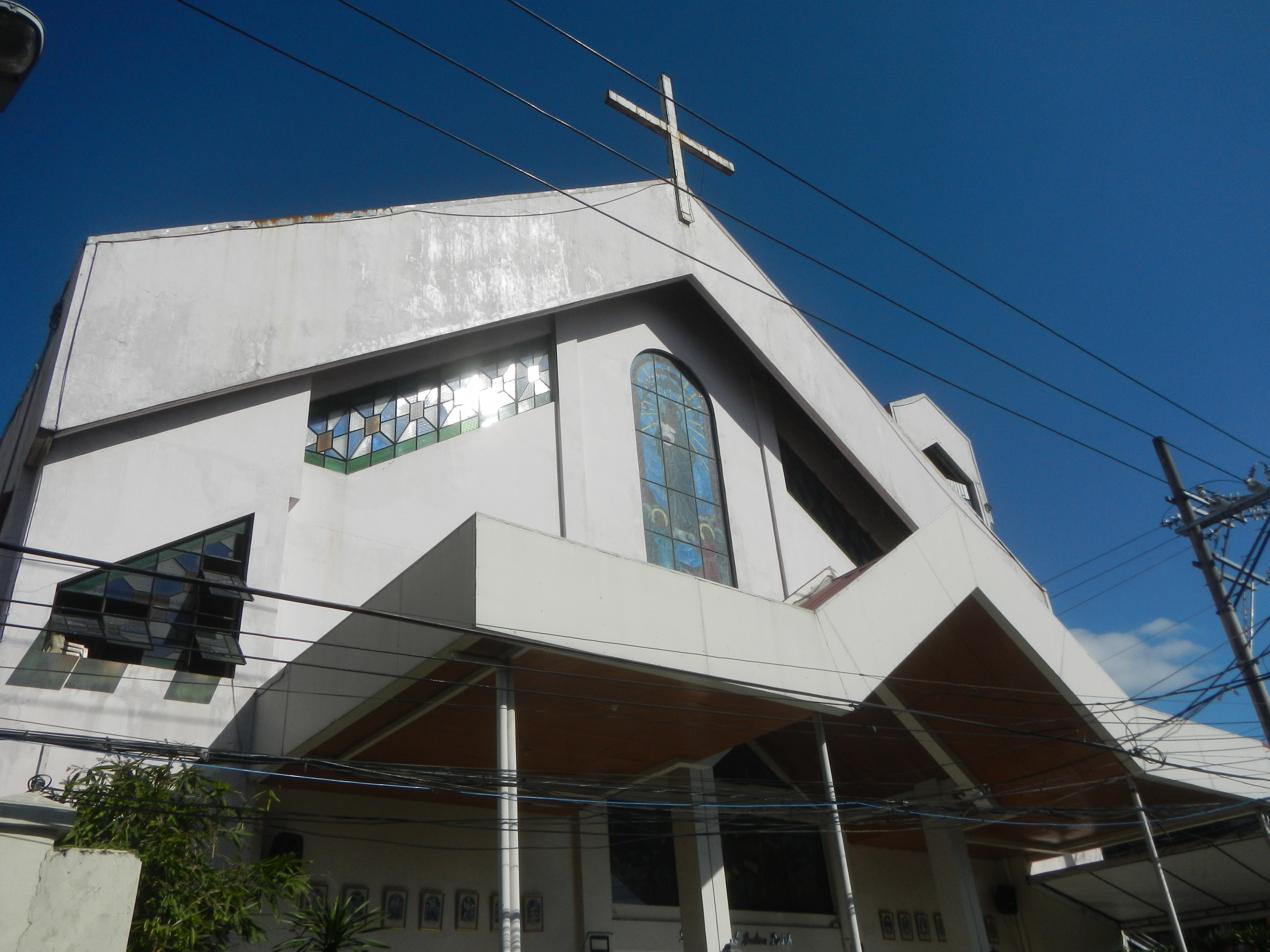
Mary Mirror of Justice Parish in Comembo is one of the places of worship whose religious jurisdiction remains unchanged despite the transfer of the Embo barangays to Taguig

Following the ruling, the Pembo locale of the Iglesia ni Cristo in Barangay Rizal, alongside other local congregations in Taguig, was transferred from Ecclesiastical District of Metro Manila South to the Ecclesiastical District of Metro Manila East. Consequently, the Ecclesiastical District of Metro Manila South was reduced to include only local congregations in Las Piñas and Muntinlupa, as those in southern Makati, Parañaque, and Pasay were transferred to the Ecclesiastical District of Makati.

However, the six Roman Catholic parishes in the Embo barangays remain under the Archdiocese of Manila, which includes Makati, and were not transferred to the Diocese of Pasig, which includes Taguig. This is because diocesan boundaries are determined by the Vatican and do not necessarily follow civil boundaries. Consequently, such parishes remain under the jurisdiction of the episcopal vicar for Makati.

Additionally, the group that meets at The Church of Jesus Christ of Latter-day Saints chapel in Comembo continues to be referred to as Makati Philippines East Stake despite the barangay's new location in northern Taguig.
