= Taguig People's Park =

Urban riverfront park in Taguig, Metro Manila, Philippines

Coordinates: 14°33′54″N 121°3′21″E

- Entrance to the Taguig People's Park
- Interactive map of Taguig People's Park
- Type: Urban park
- Location: Cembo and West Rembo, Taguig, Philippines
- Area: 3.5433 hectares (35,433 m^{2})
- Created: 1994; 32 years ago
- Closed: March 3, 2024 – May 6, 2025
- Founder: City of Makati
- Owner: City of Taguig
- Administrator: Taguig City Parks & Recreation Office
- Status: Open

The Taguig People's Park, also known as the TLC People's Park, is an urban riverfront park along the south bank of the Pasig River in West Rembo, Taguig, Philippines. To its south the park faces the University of Makati just across J. P. Rizal Avenue. It is a bird sanctuary and a plant nursery. A small portion of the park protrudes into barangay Cembo. The park was also known as the Liwasang Bonifacio (Bonifacio Park), Fort Bonifacio Riverside Park, and formerly as Liwasang Makati (Makati Park).

The park was developed by the City of Makati when the Embo barangays were still under the city's control, and the park was then known as the Makati Park and Garden from 1998 to 2025. Following the resolution of the territorial dispute between the cities of Makati and Taguig in 2022, the Fort Bonifacio military reservation, including the Embo barangays were declared as part of Taguig. A standoff between the security personnel of Makati and the traffic management personnel of Taguig occurred in the park in March 2024, which resulted in the closure of the park as the two cities fought for ownership of affected public properties. Taguig gained full and exclusive possession of the park by virtue of a court order in May 2025.

== History ==
=== Makati Park and Garden (1998–2024) ===
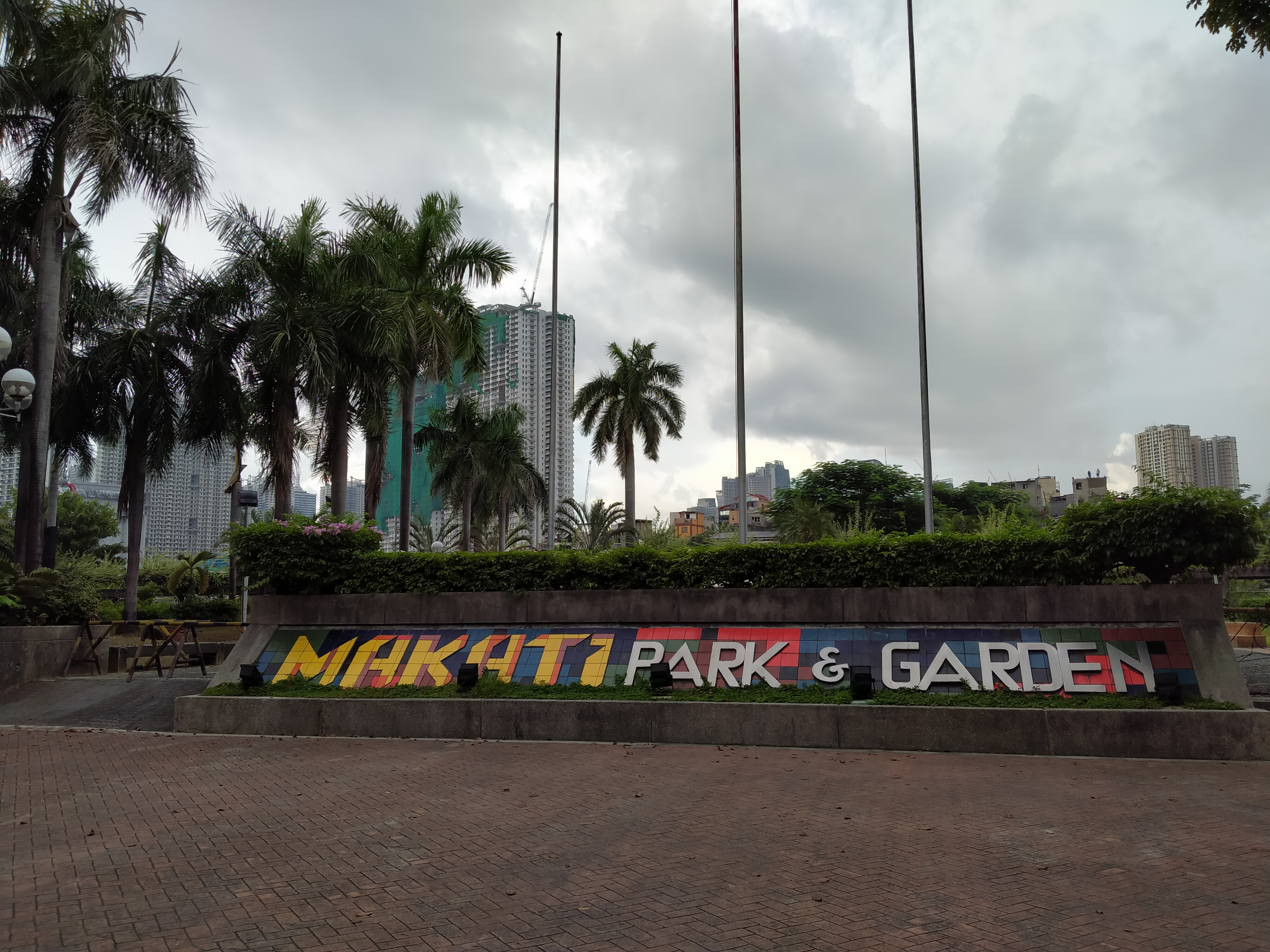
Former Makati Park & Garden frontage

The Taguig People's Park was originally developed by the City of Makati when the Embo barangays were still under Makati's control, and it was given the name of Liwasang Makati (Makati Park) and Liwasang Bonifacio (Bonifacio Park) upon its inception.

In 1994, the City of Makati engaged with the services of an architectural firm to design the Liwasang Bonifacio. It was then in 1995 when the construction started until its completion in 1998. The park has an area of 35,433 square meters (381,400 sq ft) and its administration was assigned to the Department of Environmental Services who is responsible for the maintenance of the park. The park was opened to the public.

The park houses Makati's plant nursery, and is a sanctuary of birds within the area. Makati Park and Garden is also a place for events as it has its own pavilion and amphitheater venue. It is a frequent place to visit of local residents and students of nearby educational institutions to relax, unwind, and to exercise or for recreational activities. The city designated the same as a safe place for students.

In the aftermath of the 2021 Supreme Court decision, which was decided in favor of Taguig gaining jurisdiction of Fort Bonifacio and the Embo barangays, ownership and management of the park has been disputed between the cities of Makati and Taguig.

=== 2024 standoff and closure ===
On March 1, 2024, Taguig Traffic Management Office (TMO) members attempted to seize control of the park but was prevented by the Makati Public Safety Department (PSD). During the park's attempted takeover and closure, Makati city government employees were reportedly trapped inside the park and in the Makati Aqua Sports Arena (MASA), respectively. The incident led to the filing of illegal detention cases against Taguig officials led by Mayor Lani Cayetano before the Taguig City Prosecutor's Office. The illegal detention charges were later dismissed due to lack of evidence.

Subsequently, on March 3, 2024, the City of Taguig issued a closure order citing the lack of permits of Makati to operate the park, closing the park's operation including that of the then-Makati Aqua Sports Arena. Taguig, for its part, cited that under the Local Government Code, it is authorized to regulate any business, trade, and activity within its jurisdiction, and it acknowledges Makati's unlawful possession of the park premises. Makati claims that the closure of MASA affected 4,400 Makati public school students who use it for their swimming lessons.

=== Taguig People's Park (2025–present) ===
Taguig People's Park frontage in July 2025

On May 5, 2025, the Taguig City Regional Trial Court issued a temporary restraining order (TRO) or injunction directing the City of Makati to stop denying Taguig access and exclusive possession of public properties covered by Proclamation Nos. 518 and 1916 within the Embo district. Taguig took possession of the properties the following day, including multipurpose buildings, health centers, covered courts, and the park. The TRO was given a 17-day extension on May 9. Before the TRO extension expires, the court granted the City of Taguig's request for preliminary injunction, which effectively retains Taguig's control of the facilities for the continued public services for the Embo barangays.

The park was renamed by the City of Taguig as the "Taguig People's Park", following the city's possession of public properties covered by Proclamation Nos. 518 and 1916. The park reopened to the public on the following day after the city's takeover, and has remained open since then for the benefit and enjoyment of the public.

== Landmarks and structures ==
The park also features a small lake, fountains, a man-made waterfall, an aviary, amphitheater, pavilion, and gazebos, including a floating octagonal gazebo. The park's Artist Pavilion serves as a function hall and is a favorite venue for social activities and receptions such as wedding and birthdays.

=== Andres Bonifacio Monument ===
The Andrés Bonifacio Monument was designed by Filipino sculptor Juan Sajid Imao, son of National Artist Abdulmari Imao. It was erected in 1997 to commemorate Bonifacio's death centennial. In November 2017, the Bonifacio monument was relocated by the Department of Public Works and Highways several meters to make way for the construction of Santa Monica–Lawton Bridge or Kalayaan Bridge, which would link Bonifacio Global City with Ortigas Center.

=== Taguig Aquatic Sports Complex ===
The Taguig Aquatic Sports Complex

The park contains a swimming pool area called the Taguig Aquatic Sports Complex. It was previously known as the Makati Aqua Sports Arena (MASA). It has an Olympic-sized swimming pool and a kid's pool. In 2024, the swimming pool area was ordered closed by the Taguig City Government as consequence of the city's territorial dispute with Makati. It affected 4,400 public school students of the Makati, as well as the swimming classes of the University of Makati. Upon Taguig's possession of the property, the city rehabilitated and improved its facilities, and reopened it to the public on July 24, 2026. The swimming pool area was re-christened as the Taguig Aquatic Sports Complex.

=== TLC Food Park–EMBO ===
The TLC Food Park–EMBO features a wide variety of cuisines and was inaugurated on October 15, 2025. It is located right across the University of Makati. It is an open-air, relaxed setting, and features food trucks and food stalls from small entrepreneurs.

== Gallery ==
Selection of places within Taguig People's Park

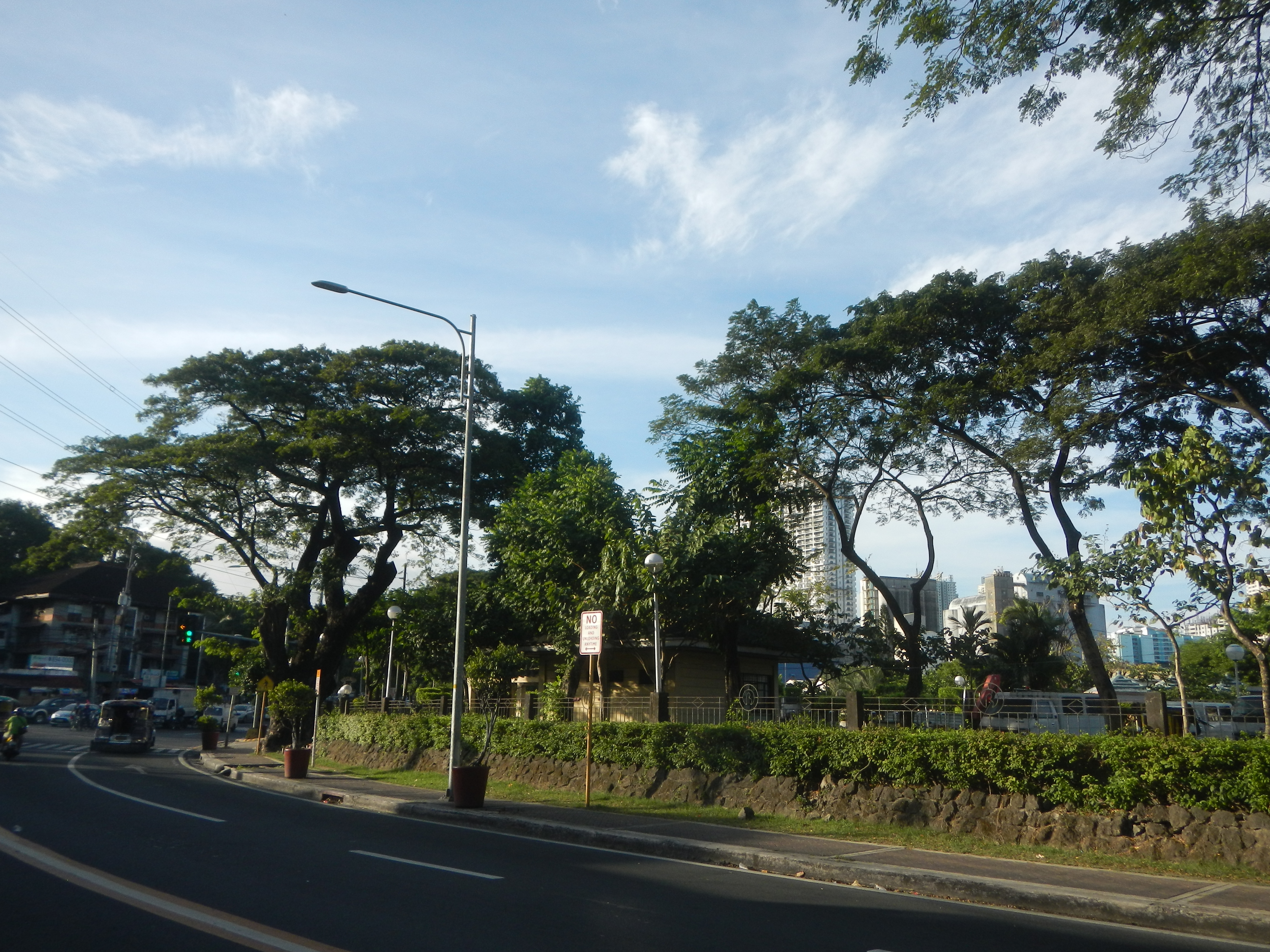
Portion of the riverfront park facing J.P. Rizal Avenue

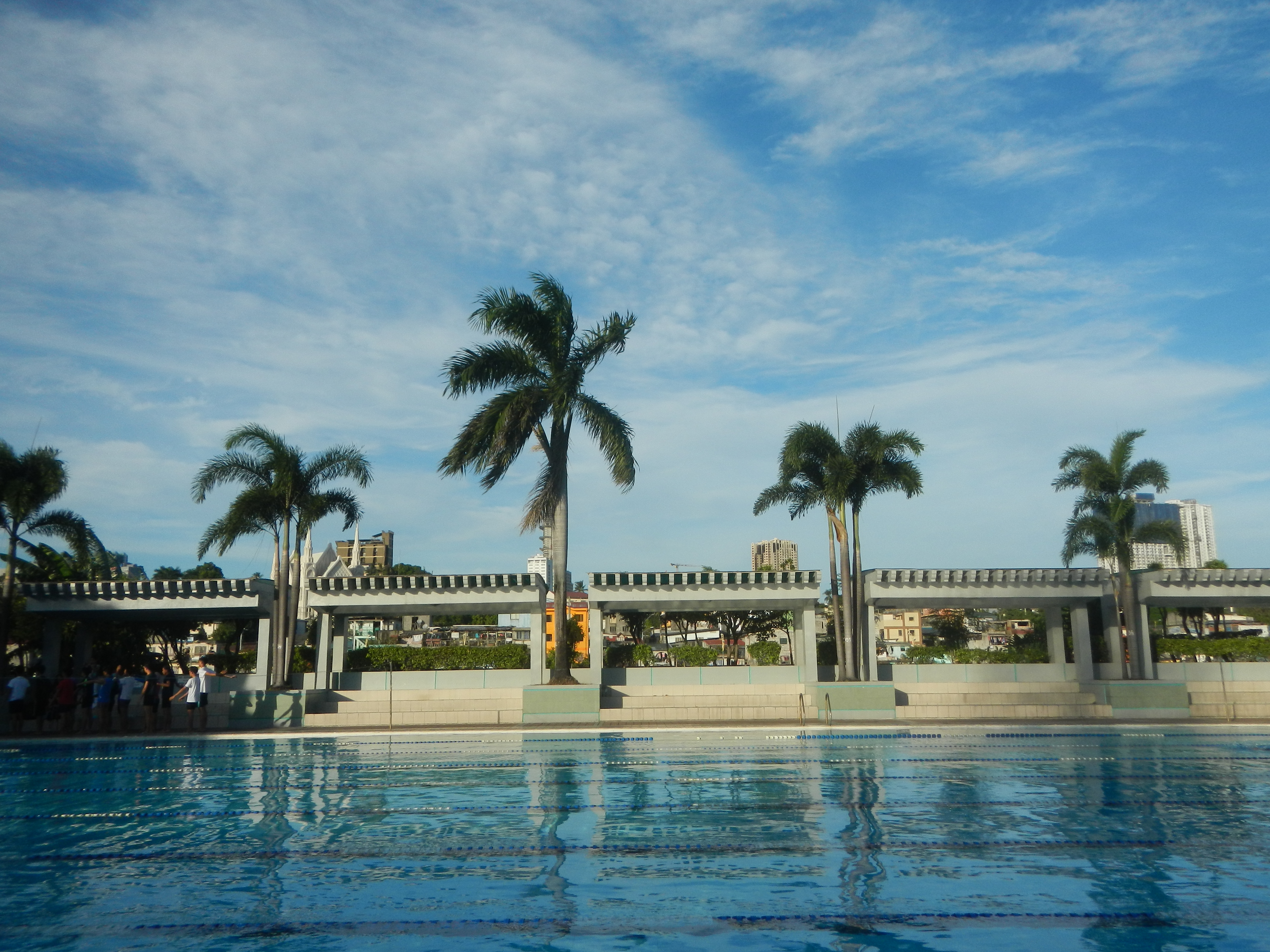
Olympic-sized swimming pool

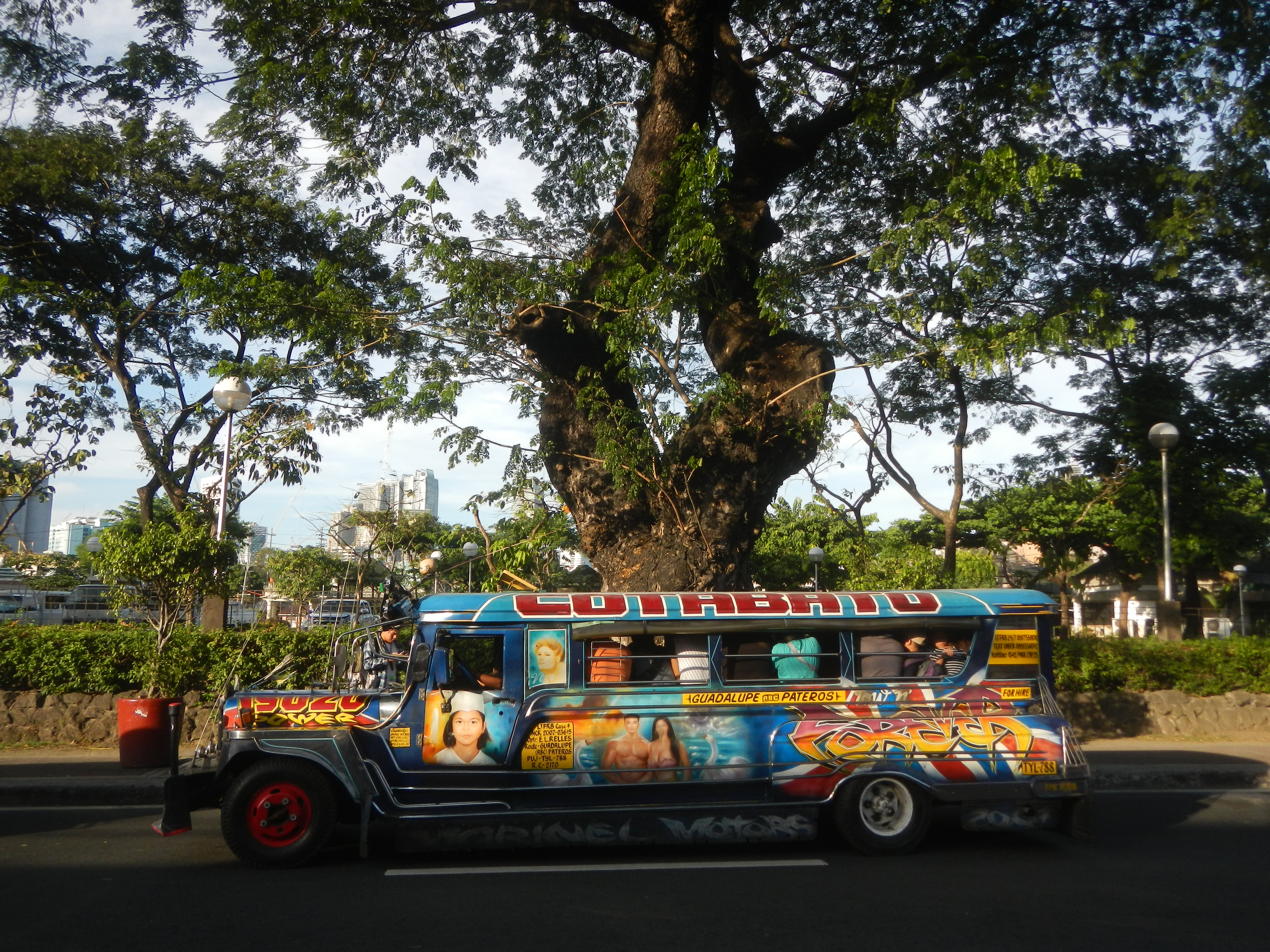
A Jeepney with the historic acacia tree in the background

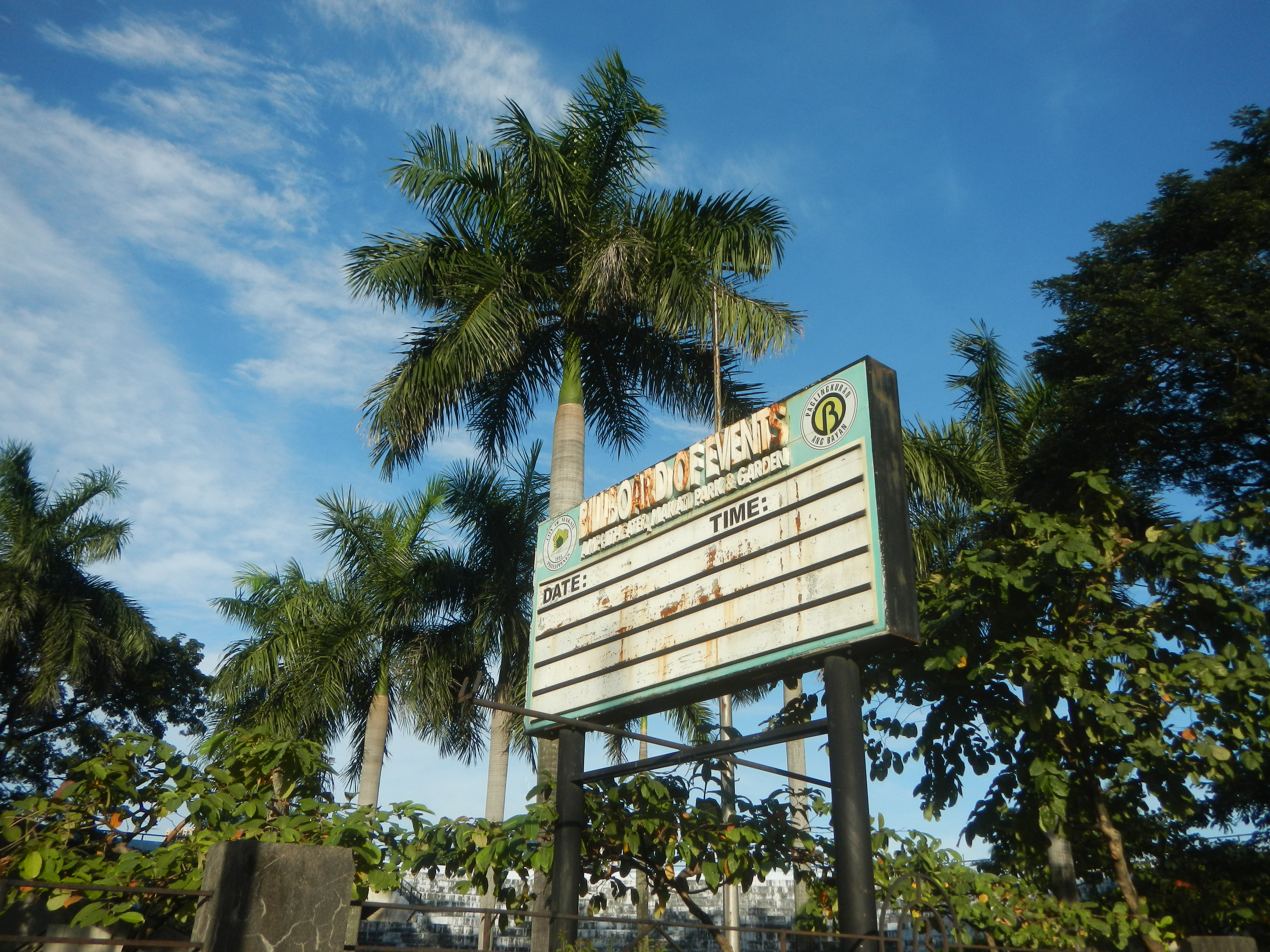
Billboard of events for the amphitheater

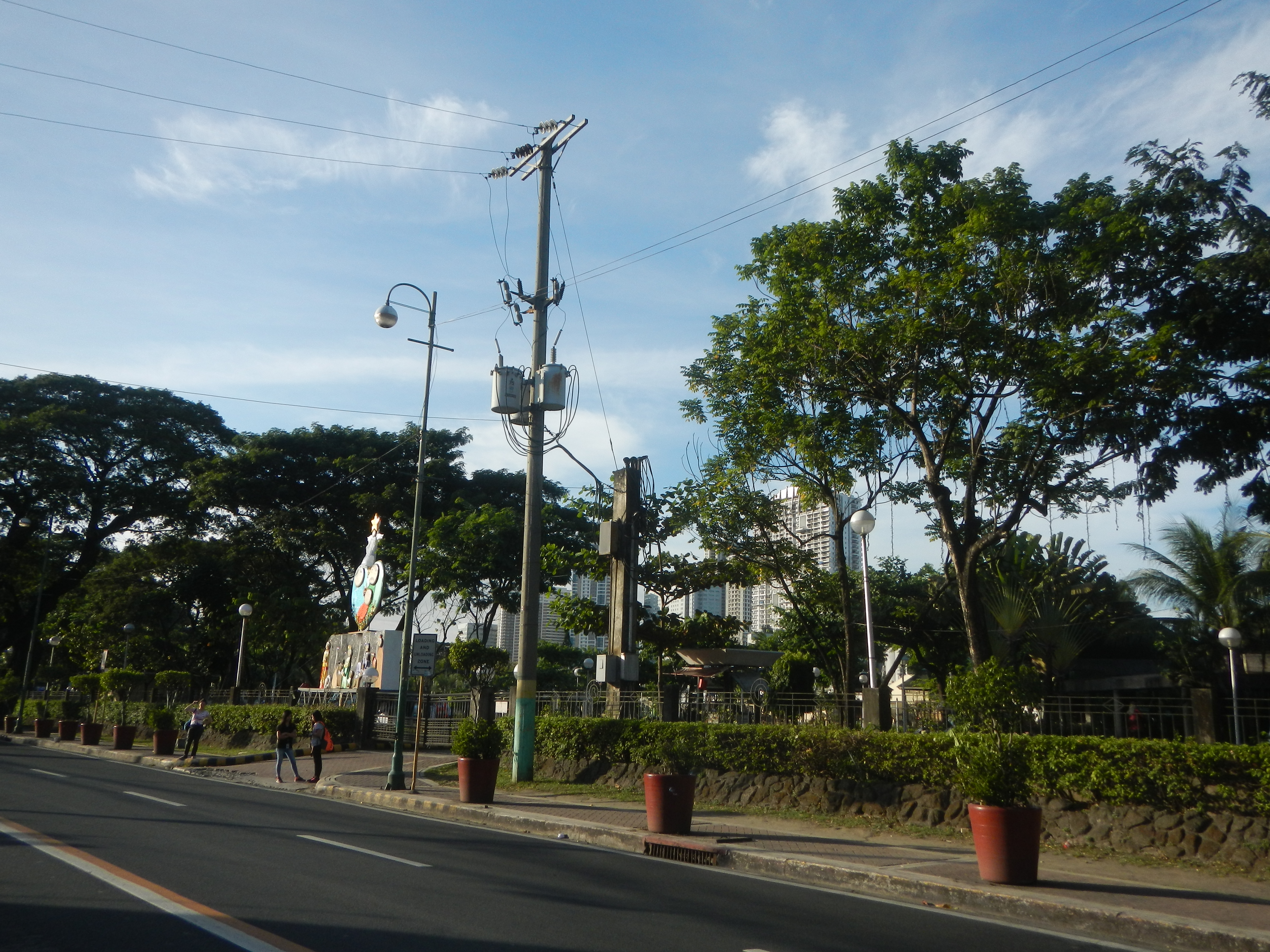
The former Makati Park and Garden circa 2017

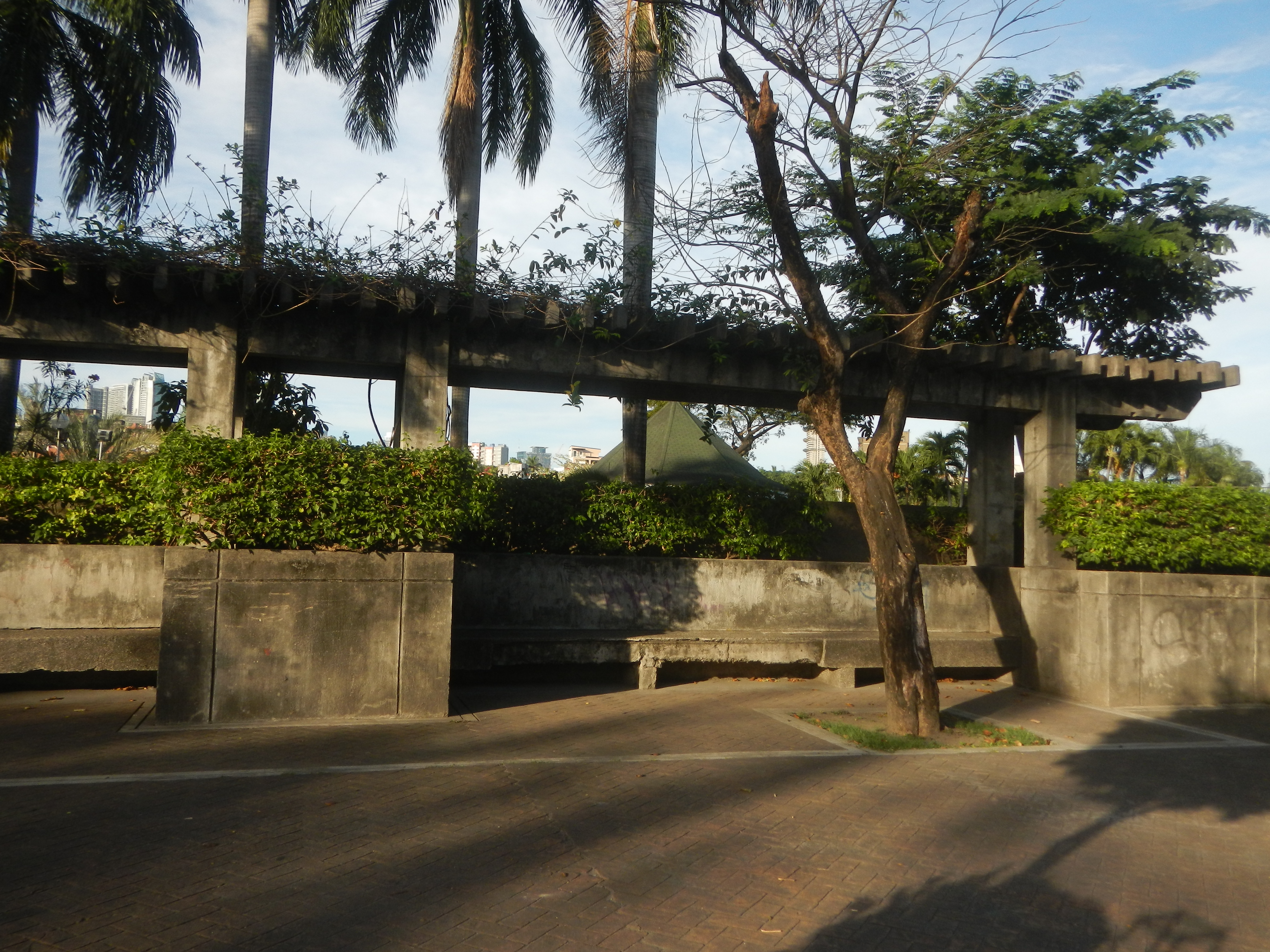
A dedicated bench facing J.P Rizal Avenue & University of Makati

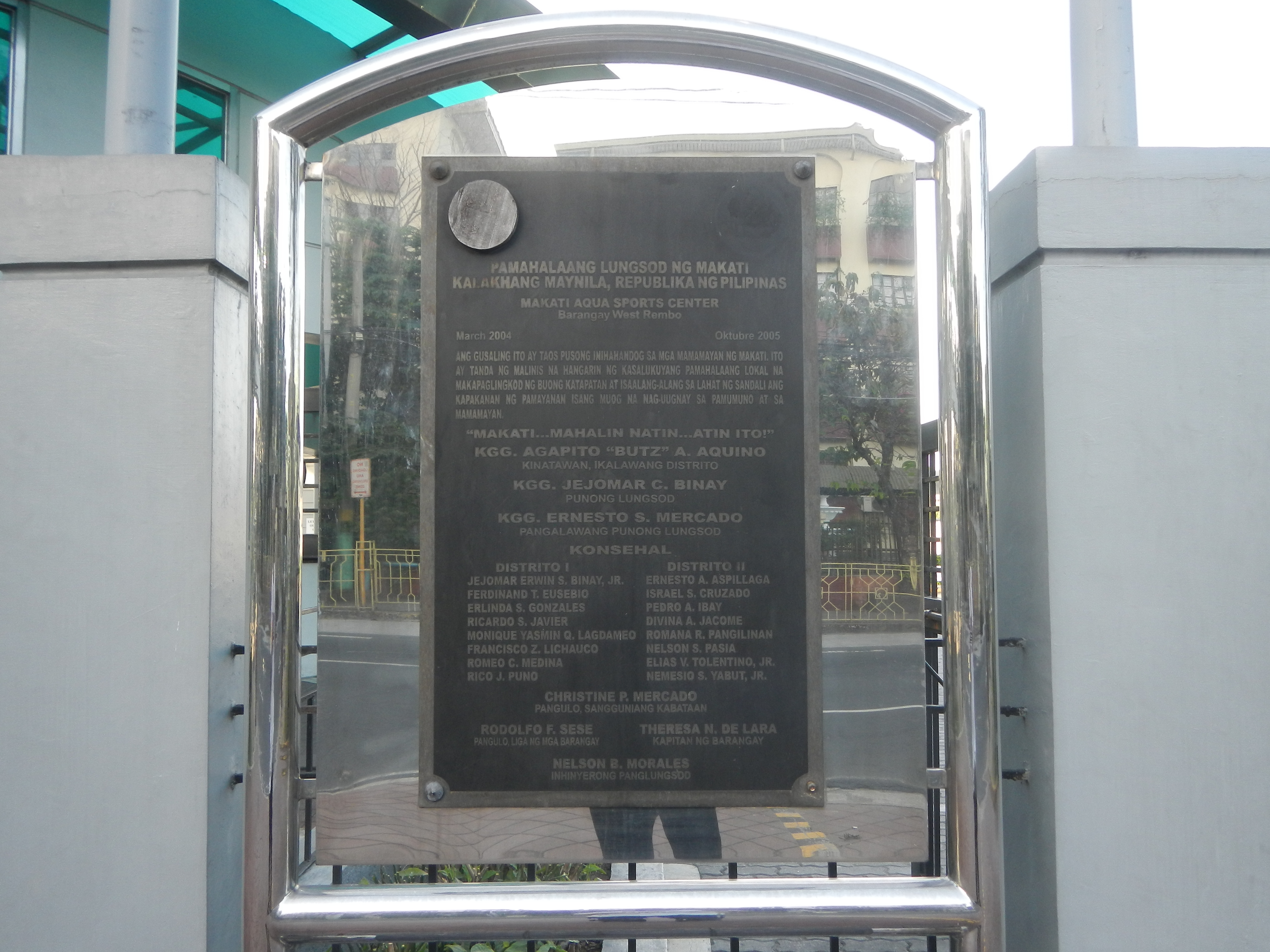
Historical Marker
