= Senator Renato "Compañero" Cayetano Memorial Science and Technology High School =

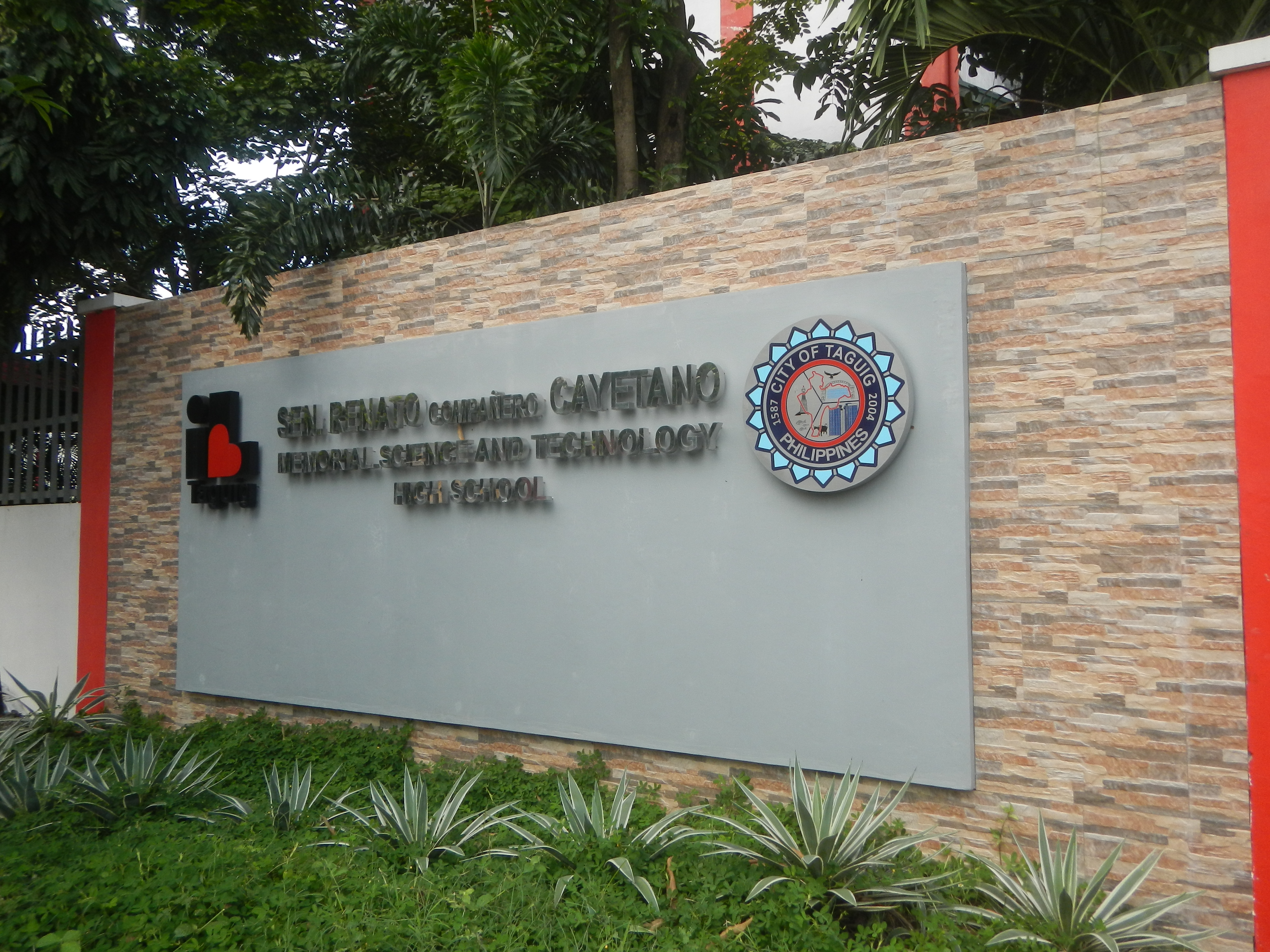

Location
- 31st Street, Pamayanang Diego Silang, Ususan, Taguig City; Philippines

Information
- Other name: SRCCMSTHS
- Type: Public specialized high school
- Established: September 2005
- Educational authority: Schools Divisions Office of Taguig City and Pateros
- Grades: 7 - 12
- Campus type: Urban
- Publication: El Compañero
- Budget: ₱18.7 million (2025)

Senator Renato "Compañero" Cayetano Memorial Science and Technology High School (SRCCMSTHS), commonly known as SRCC, is a public science high school in Ususan, Taguig, Philippines. It is one of the three science high schools of the city, and is under the management and administration of the Schools Divisions Office of Taguig City and Pateros (SDO-TAPAT). The school was named after Rene "Compañero" Cayetano, a Taguig native who served as assemblyman and senator.

== History ==
On February 21, 2002, then-Congressman Alan Peter Cayetano filed House Bill No. 4448 in the 12th Congress, which sought to establish and fund a science and technology high school is Pamayanang Diego Silang, Ususan, Taguig. It is to be known as the Taguig-Pateros (TAPAT) Science and Technology High School. On September 4, 2002, a Memorandum of Agreement (MOA) was signed between Congressman Cayetano, the Bases Conversion and Development Authority and the Schools Division Office of Taguig and Pateros (SDO TAPAT) for the allocation of 5,000 square meters of land for the school inside Pamayanang Diego Silang. The site was immediately fenced through the efforts of the late Sen. Renato “Compañero” Cayetano, father of Congressman Alan Cayetano.

A four-storey, 12-classroom school building was immediately built on the site, followed by another four-storey 12-classroom building. The DEPED National Capital Region approved the establishment of the school after the SDO TAPAT complied and met the standard of a science and technology school.

At the end of the school year of 2004-2005, then-Congressman Edmundo O. Reyes, Jr. filed a bill in the 13th Congress renaming the school as the Senator Renato "Compañero" Cayetano Memorial Science and Technology High School.

During the onset of the COVID-19 pandemic in the city, face-to-face classes and activities in the school were suspended. Online classes were held as part of the city's initiative in maintaining health protocols. While in the midst of pandemic and the suspension of on-site activities, SRCCMSTHS piloted the "cyber graduation", where graduates of the school were represented using robots to maintain the city's health protocols.

In 2022, Taguig Mayor Lani Cayetano took her oath at the school grounds when she was sworn in as the mayor of the city. Later on, SRCCMSTHS bagged the top two prizes in 2023 at the International Science Drama Competition 2023 held in Bangkok, Thailand.

== See also ==
- Makati Science High School
- Taguig Science High School
