= Makati Science High School =

Public high school in Taguig, Philippines

- Mataas na Paaralang Pang-Agham ng Makati
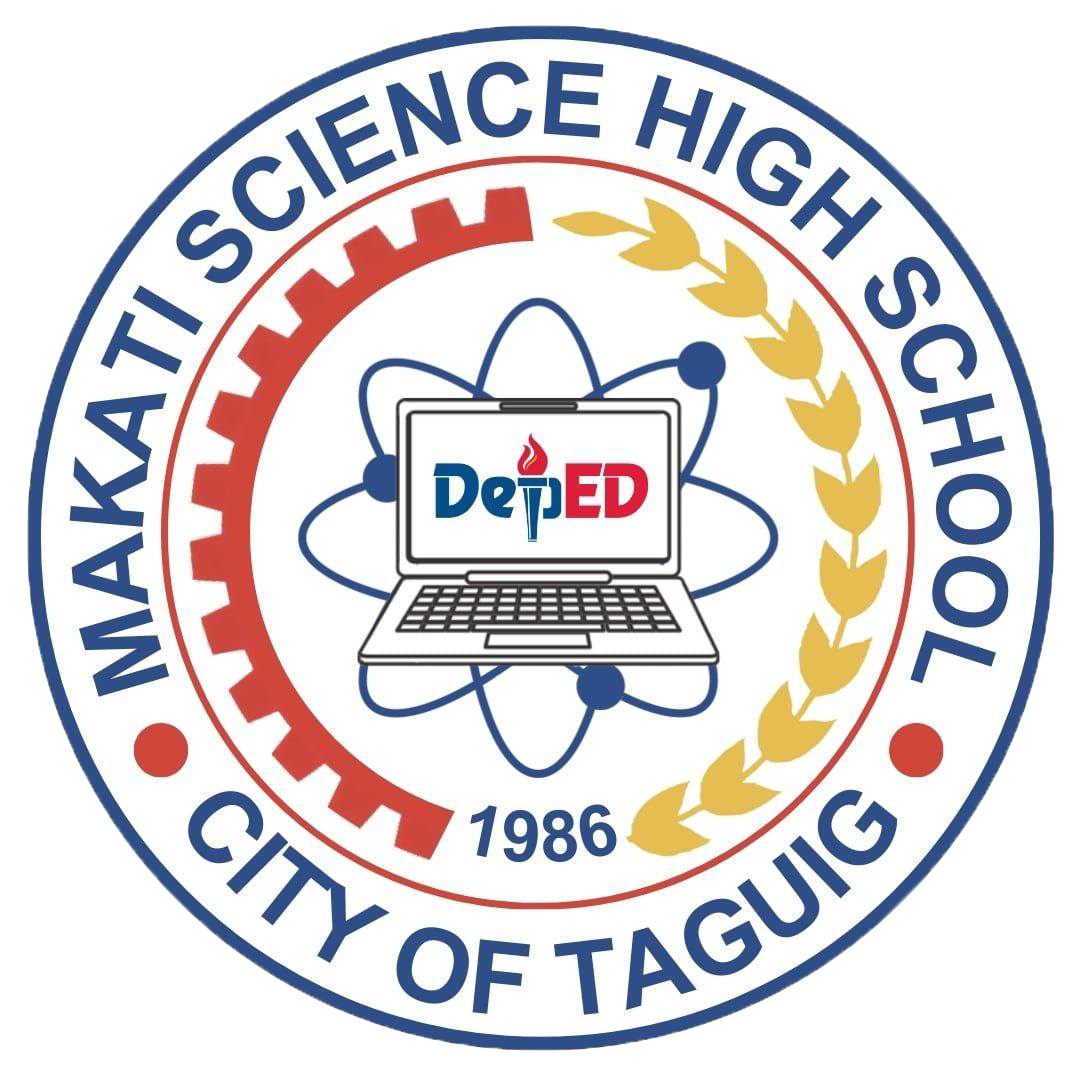

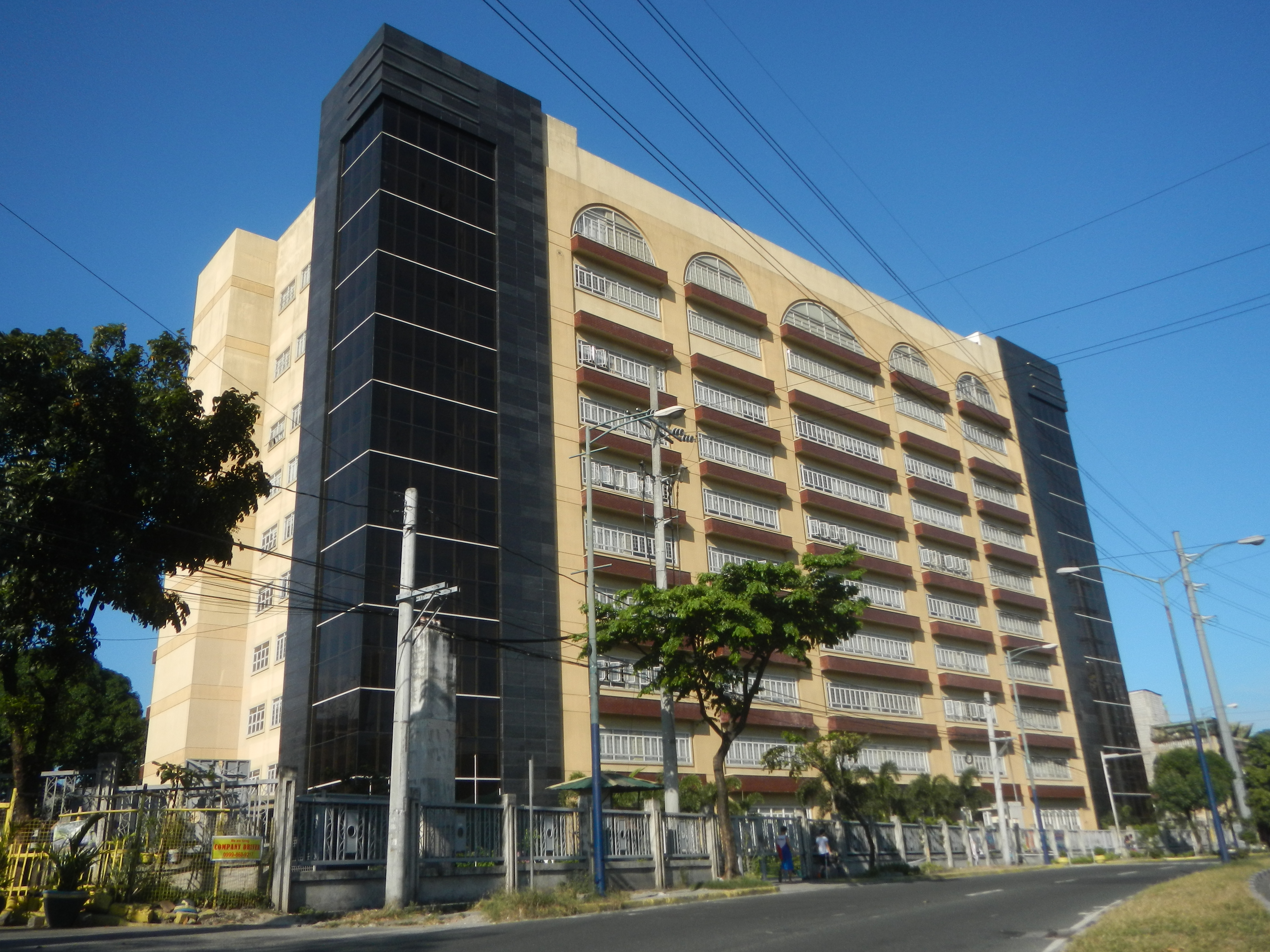

Location
- 09 Kalayaan Avenue, Cembo, Taguig, Metro Manila 1640; Philippines
- Coordinates: 14°33′47″N 121°03′09″E

Information
- Former name: Makati West High School
- School type: Science High School
- Established: 1986
- Educational authority: Schools Divisions Office of Taguig City and Pateros
- Principal: Owen Blanco Ombid
- Enrollment: ≈ 1,300 students
- Song: Makati Science High School Hymn
- Budget: ₱31.95 million (2025)
- Website: www.makatiscience.com

Makati Science High School (Filipino: Mataas na Paaralang Pang-Agham ng Makati), abbreviated as MSHS and also known as MakSci, is a public science high school in Cembo, Taguig, Philippines. It is one of the three science high schools in the city under the Schools Divisions Office of Taguig City and Pateros (SDO-TaPat).

MakSci was established on June 16, 1986 as the Makati West High School. It became a science high school in 1994, and was relocated to its current campus along Kalayaan Avenue, Cembo in 2014. Previously under the city of Makati, its administration and management was transferred to the city of Taguig in 2024 following the Supreme Court ruling of the territorial dispute between the cities of Makati and Taguig, which was ruled with finality in favor of Taguig.

== History ==
Makati Science High School, initially established as Makati West High School on June 16, 1986, was established by the Makati city government under then-Mayor Jejomar Binay. Its first campus is located on Mayapis Street in Barangay San Antonio, Makati, the school was created to meet the educational needs of elementary graduates in Makati's first legislative district. At its inauguration, it became the third public secondary school in what was then the municipality of Makati, following the establishment of Makati High School in 1968 and Fort Bonifacio High School in 1947 (which is now under Taguig's jurisdiction).

In 1994, the school was renamed Makati Science High School to reflect its focus on science and technology education. Three years later, in 1997, it relocated to Osias Street in Barangay Poblacion. By 2014, the school had moved to its current premises on Kalayaan Avenue in Barangay Cembo. On March 31, 2019, a fire broke out in one of the classrooms on the sixth floor.

A major administrative shift occurred in 2022 when the Supreme Court of the Philippines ruled that Makati should cease exercising jurisdiction, treating it as part of its territory, and making improvements over Barangay Cembo. This ruling placed the Makati Science High School under Taguig's jurisdiction. Following this decision, the Department of Education - National Capital Region (DepEd NCR) transferred the administration, management, and supervision of the school from Makati City's Schools Division Office to the School Divisions Office of Taguig City and Pateros (SDO-TAPAT) for the August 2023 school year.

To avoid potential conflicts between Makati and Taguig amidst ongoing disputes, the national Department of Education (DepEd) temporarily assumed direct oversight of Makati Science High School. This interim measure remained in place until January 1, 2024, when all 14 Embo elementary and high schools, including Makati Science High School, were officially transferred from Makati to Taguig, thereby placing the school once again under the management of SDO-TAPAT.

The Makati City Government later appealed to retain Makati Science High School under the SDO of Makati. However, their request was rejected by DepEd, citing a lack of legal basis and justification. DepEd Undersecretary Revsee Escobedo cited that granting the request would violate the Supreme Court ruling, the Constitution, and the Basic Education Act of 2001, which mandates that basic education governance is a responsibility of the national government.

== Campus ==
The campus of MSHS is located along Kalayaan Avenue in Cembo, Taguig. Its 10-storey (excluding basement parking) school building contains state-of-the-art facilities such as ten science laboratories, three computer labs, two canteens, two elevators, a library, a speech lab, an audio-visual room, a clinic, six faculty rooms, and 30 classrooms. The eighth floor houses a dormitory, while the ninth and tenth floors contain an auditorium. However, the top three floors are still under construction and remain inaccessible to the public. The school campus also features a basketball court on its left side and a garden at the back.

=== Controversy ===
The school building was involved in a graft case against former vice president Jejomar Binay and his son, former Makati mayor Junjun Binay. The building was indicated to have cost ₱1.3 billion (US$22.5 million) or ₱72,500 per square meter, when it should have only been worth ₱470 million (US$9.2 million) or ₱25,620 per square meter. In December 2024, however, the Sandiganbayan granted the demurrer and acquitted all the accused, including the Binays, in the case.

== See also ==
- Senator Renato "Compañero" Cayetano Memorial Science and Technology High School
- Taguig Science High School
