= Liwagao Island =

Island in the Philippines

Disputed island
- Location within Luzon
- Other names: Libago Island, Libagao Island

Geography
- Location: Tablas Strait
- Coordinates: 12°12′00.4″N 121°25′47.4″E
- Archipelago: Mindoro / Panay
- Area: 1.14 km^{2} (0.44 sq mi)
- Highest elevation: 73 m (240 ft)

Administration
- Philippines
- Province: Antique
- Municipality: Caluya
- Barangay: Silobo

Claimed by
- Philippines (internal dispute)
- Province: Occidental Mindoro
- Municipality: Bulalacao
- Barangay: Maasin

Additional information

Liwagao Island, also known as Libago Island or Libagao Island, is an island located southeast off the coast of Mindoro and northwest off Panay. The island is a disputed feature between the towns of Bulalacao, Oriental Mindoro and Caluya, Antique with the latter exercising de facto administration over the island.

== Background ==
The island has an area of 1.14 square kilometers (0.44 sq mi). It is currently under the administration of the municipality of Caluya in Antique. It is administered by the municipality as part of Barangay Sibolo.

In 1919, its elevation was recorded at 73 meters (240 ft), and at this time it was noted that the island had a few inhabitants, was "covered with low, dark scrubby trees" and was "fringed by reefs." At this time it was noted that three summits exist on the eastern area of the island and that the island's western area is "a low, flat sandy point."

== Dispute ==
=== Bulalacao claim ===
Presidential Proclamation No. 1801 issued by then President Ferdinand Marcos on November 10, 1978, which declared select islands, coves, and peninsulas in the Philippines as tourist zones and marine reserves under the management of the Philippine Tourism Authority names Liwagao Island as part of Bulalacao town of Oriental Mindoro. The provincial government of Oriental Mindoro cites this decree as proof of Bulalacao's jurisdiction over the island which it considers as part of Maasin, one of the town's barangays.

The Oriental Mindoro provincial board sought to resolve its claims over Liwagao Island by engaging in talks with their counterparts in Antique. The Antique provincial board issued a resolution on May 25, 2012, stating that it is not amenable "to any form of settlement on the alleged dispute" involving the island. Oriental Mindoro officials filed a petition before the Regional Trial Court in Roxas, Capiz on September 12, 2012. Occidental Mindoro officials cites affidavits submitted by residents of Liwagao in August 2012 who expressed desire that their island be under the jurisdiction of Bulalacao and an affidavit submitted also on August by Oscar Lim, former mayor of Caluya testifying of making a "verbal agreement" in 1978 or 1979 with then-Bulalacao mayor Dolores Bago of "temporarily borrowing" Liwagao until the end of his term to pursue fugitives escaping from Caluya authorities. Lim said hed had returned Liwagao to Bulalacao under Bago's successor and brother, Guillermo Salas.

The island due to its beaches is planned to be developed for tourism by the officials of Bulalacao and Oriental Mindoro.

=== Caluya claim ===
Resolution No. 142-2012 of the Provincial Board of Antique expressed Antique province's position in the dispute. It asserts that Liwagao is within its territorial jurisdiction citing an original certificate of title 42891 issued by the Register of Deeds to Joaquin Lim which identified the contested island as part of Barangay Sibolo of the town of Caluya. It also cites the records of the Commission on Election which contains names of Liwagao residents who are registered as voters of Sibolo as well as elected barangay officials from the locality that are residents of the island. It also points out that a map by the National Mapping and Resource Information Authority displays the island as geographically part of Antique.

== 2021 court ruling ==
The Regional Trial Court (RTC) Branch 43 in Roxas, Oriental Mindoro issued a ruling on August 19, 2021, that Liwagao "is within the territorial, political and administrative jurisdiction" of Bulalacao. The decision can still be appealed.
