= List of territorial disputes =

Disputed territories shown in red

A territorial dispute is a disagreement over the possession of territories (airspace, land, or water) between two or more political entities.

Bold indicates one claimant's full control; italics indicates one or more claimants' partial control.

== Ongoing disputes between UN member/observer states ==
=== Africa ===
Territory	Claimants	Notes
Al-Fashaga District	**Sudan**; Ethiopia	The Al Fushqa or Al Fashaga district is a disputed area between Ethiopia and Sudan, specifically Al Qadarif and Amhara.
Abyei, Jodha, Kafia Kingi, Heglig, Bebnis, Jebel Megeinis and 14-mile area near Kiir river.	**Sudan**; South Sudan	Both Sudan and South Sudan have claimed the area after the civil war that led to South Sudan's independence. Heglig was controlled by South Sudan in mid-April 2012, but retaken by Sudan.
Banc du Geyser	**France**; Comoros; Madagascar	Scattered Islands in the Indian Ocean, a district of the French Southern Territories.
Bassas da India, Europa Island and Juan de Nova Island	**France**; Madagascar	De facto part of the French overseas territory of the French Southern Territories.
Ceuta, Melilla, and the plazas de soberanía	**Spain**; Morocco	Melilla and Ceuta have been Spanish territories since 1497 and 1640 respectively. They have had the status of autonomous cities since 1995. After an incident on Perejil Island in 2002, both countries agreed to return to the status quo.
Chagos Archipelago	**United Kingdom**; Maldives; Mauritius	The United Kingdom de facto administers the archipelago as the British Indian Ocean Territory. Mauritius and the Maldives claim the islands. On 22 May 2025, Mauritius and the United Kingdom signed a deal to hand sovereignty over to Mauritius; the dispute between the two will end once the deal is ratified by both parties. However, the Maldives opposed the negotiations.
Doumeira Mountain, Ras Doumeira and Doumeira Island	**Eritrea**; Djibouti	Basis of the Djiboutian–Eritrean border conflict of 2008. Disputed territory occupied by Eritrea following withdrawal of Qatari peacekeepers in June 2017. Alternatively transliterated as the Dumaira Mountains.
Glorioso Islands	**France**; Madagascar; Comoros	De facto a part of the French overseas territory of the French Southern Territories. Formally claimed by Seychelles before 2001.
Guinea–Liberia border	Guinea; Liberia	In March 2026, tensions rose along the Guinea–Liberia border after reports that Guinean soldiers crossed into Liberian territory near Sorlumba in Foya District, Lofa County. Local officials stated that Guinean troops halted road construction work near the Makona River, seized equipment being used in the area, and removed a Liberian flag from the disputed location. The incident prompted diplomatic engagement between the governments of Liberia and Guinea. Liberian President Joseph Boakai traveled to Conakry in March 2026 for emergency talks with Guinean officials and regional leaders aimed at easing tensions and resolving the dispute peacefully. Regional organizations including the Economic Community of West African States called for restraint while diplomatic efforts continued to address the situation along the frontier.
Hala'ib Triangle and Bir Tawil	**Egypt**; Sudan	Previously under joint administration; Egypt now maintains full de facto control of the Hala'ib Triangle. The boundaries claimed by Egypt and Sudan both include the Hala'ib Triangle. The area of Bir Tawil close to the triangle is unclaimed by both countries.
Migingo Island and the vicinity of the islands of Lolwe, Oyasi, Remba, Ringiti and Sigulu and the surrounding waters.	**Kenya**; Uganda	
Ilemi Triangle	**Kenya**; South Sudan	De facto controlled by Kenya. Ethiopian tribes used and made raids in the land, but the Ethiopian government has never made a claim to it, agreeing it was Sudanese in 1902, 1907, and 1972 treaties.
KaNgwane and Ingwavuma	**South Africa**; Eswatini	Eswatini claims territories that it states were confiscated during colonial times. The area claimed by Eswatini is the former bantustan of KaNgwane, which now forms the northern parts of Jozini and uMhlabuyalingana local municipalities in KwaZulu-Natal, and the southern part of Nkomazi, the southeastern part of Umjindi and the far eastern part of Albert Luthuli local municipalities in Mpumalanga.
Koalou village and surrounding area	Burkina Faso; Benin	Burkina Faso and Benin retain a border dispute at this 7.75 km^{2} triangular area of land near the tripoint border with Togo. In a 2008 meeting, it was declared that the territory was a neutral zone, neither Burkinabé nor Beninese. According to the UN Refugee Agency in 2015, there were issues of children being born stateless in the area, however, a Beninese civil registration office has taken control of registering births in the area.
Kpéaba village area (near Sipilou/Siquita)	**Ivory Coast**; Guinea	The Guinean military occupied this village for 1 month from January to February 2013, before withdrawing in preparation for talks. In December 2016, Guinea soldiers and civilians attacked the village, killing 1 and wounding several others, before returning to their side of the border. According to the Guinean Minister of Defence, the Guinean army had been asked not to send any soldiers to this area and had no involvement in this incident.
Area near Logoba/Moyo District	South Sudan; Uganda	A 1914 British colonial order defined the international border based on the tribal boundary between the Kuku of Kajokeji (South Sudan) and the Ma'di of Moyo (Uganda). However, the border was never formally demarcated. In 2014, a conflict was triggered by the Ugandan national census when Ugandan officials were detained by South Sudan authorities.
Area near Chiengi, Lunchinda-Pweto Province	**Zambia**; DR Congo	Zambia and Congo have different interpretations of the borders set out in an 1894 treaty between British settlers and Leopold II, King of the Belgians. There have been incidents between the armies of both countries in 1996, 2006, and 2016. In March 2020, Zambia deployed troops on the Congolese side of the border.
Right bank of the Lunkinda River (near the village of Pweto)	**DR Congo**; Zambia	
Mayotte	**France**; Comoros	Under the 2009 referendum, the population supported becoming an overseas department of France, so Mayotte became one on 31 March 2011.
Islands in Mbamba Bay and Lake Nyasa	**Tanzania**; Malawi	Lundo Island and Mbamba Island are claimed as part of the lake, as Malawi has claims to the shore − based on the 1890 Anglo-German treaty. See Tanzania–Malawi dispute.
Several islands in the Congo River	Republic of the Congo; DR Congo	Most of the boundary in the Congo River remains undefined.
An island in the Ntem River	Cameroon; Equatorial Guinea	
Several villages near the Okpara River	Benin; Nigeria	
The Rufunzo Valley and Sabanerwa	Rwanda; Burundi	In 1965, the Akanyaru River changed course due to heavy rains. Burundians point to Rwandan farmers for contributing to the change of course by rice-growing.
Rukwanzi Island and the Semliki River valley	**DR Congo**; Uganda	The dispute is related to fishing rights in Lake Edward and Lake Albert.
Margherita Peak in the Rwenzori mountains	DR Congo; Uganda	Uganda rejects the DROC claim to Margherita Peak in the Rwenzori mountains and considers it a boundary divide.
Sindabezi Island	**Zambia**; Zimbabwe	Tourist island on the Zambezi River, west of the Victoria Falls
Tromelin Island	**France**; Mauritius; Madagascar	De facto a part of the French overseas territory of the French Southern Territories.
Wadi Halfa Salient	**Egypt**; Sudan	Most of the disputed territory comprised villages flooded by Lake Nasser after the construction of the Aswan Dam.
Namibia–South Africa border	South Africa; Namibia	The governments of South Africa and Namibia have not signed or ratified the text of the 1994 Surveyor's General agreement placing the boundary in the middle of the Orange River. South Africa has always claimed that the northern bank is the border, while Namibia's constitution states that the border is the middle.
Yenga	Sierra Leone; Guinea	In 2001, during Sierra Leone's civil war, the Republic of Guinea sent troops into Yenga to help the army of Sierra Leone suppress the rebel RUF. After the rebels were quashed, the Guinean soldiers remained in Yenga. Prior to the civil war Yenga was administered by the Kailahun District of Sierra Leone. In 2002 Sierra Leone and Guinea signed an agreement than Yenga would be returned to Sierra Leone, as soon as Guinea's border could be secured. In 2005 Sierra Leone and Guinea signed an agreement that Yenga belonged to Sierra Leone. The dispute was officially "resolved" in 2019 when President Ahmad Tejan Kabbah announced that "Conakry has now affirmed that Yenga is a part of Sierra Leone". However, in early 2021, President Julius Maada Bio reported to the 58th Ecowas summit that "The issue remains unresolved and our Guinean counterparts have continued to encroach on Sierra Leone's land and sea borders".

=== Americas ===
==== North America ====
Territory	Claimants	Notes
Bajo Nuevo Bank and Serranilla Bank	**Colombia**; Honduras; United States	Jamaica and Nicaragua have recognized the sovereignty of Colombia; other claimants have not. On 19 November 2012, the International Court of Justice (ICJ) ruled that Colombia has sovereignty over Bajo Nuevo Bank and Serranilla. Honduras implicitly recognized Colombian sovereignty in a 1999 maritime delimitation treaty, but continues to claim the two banks in its constitution.
Conejo Island	**Honduras**; El Salvador	
Navassa Island	**United States**; Haiti	The U.S. has claimed the island since 1857, based on the Guano Islands Act of 1856. Haiti's claim over Navassa goes back to the Treaty of Ryswick in 1697 that established French possessions in mainland Hispaniola, which were transferred from Spain by the treaty as well as other specifically named nearby islands.
Sapodilla Cayes	**Belize**; Guatemala; Honduras	Guatemala formally claims all of Belize; an International Court of Justice decision over the matter is pending.
Entirety of Belize/half of Belize	**Belize**; Guatemala	The Guatemalan Ministry of Foreign Affairs has issued a statement in which Guatemala specifically claims territory between the Sibun and Sarstoon rivers, which makes up around half of Belizean-administered territory. However, Guatemala also claims all of Belize because its historical recognition of British Honduras was contingent on the construction of a road between Guatemala City and the Atlantic Ocean which was never built, an apparent violation of the Wyke-Aycinena Treaty. An International Court of Justice decision over the matter is pending.
Archipelago of Puerto Rico	**Dominican Republic**; United States	Since 2007, the Dominican Republic in Hispaniola considers itself an archipelagic state, encroaching the long-established median or equidistance line dividing the EEZ of the Dominican Republic and Puerto Rico, and claiming portion of the EEZ claimed by the United States in relation to the archipelago of Puerto Rico, which is itself an unincorporated U.S. territory. The United States does not accept the archipelagic status and maritime boundaries claimed by the Dominican Republic. Victor Prescott, an authority in the field of maritime boundaries, argued that, as the coasts of both states are short coastlines with few offshore islands, an equidistance line is appropriate.
Machias Seal Island	**Canada**; United States	Main article: List of areas disputed by Canada and the United States Claimed by Canada as part of New Brunswick and by the United States as part of Maine
North Rock	**Canada**; United States	Main article: List of areas disputed by Canada and the United States Claimed by Canada as part of New Brunswick and by the United States as part of Maine

==== South America ====
Territory	Claimants	Notes
Guyana west of the Essequibo River and Ankoko Island	**Guyana**; Venezuela	Main article: Guyana–Venezuela territorial dispute Approximately two-thirds of Guyana is claimed by Venezuela. Following arbitration, a demarcated border was established in 1905 following the Arbitral Award of 1899. This was contested by Venezuela in 1962 following the publication of the Mallet-Prevost memorandum.
Arroyo de la Invernada or Rincón de Artigas and Vila Albornoz	**Brazil**; Uruguay	Dispute in the 237 km^{2} (92 sq mi) Invernada River region near Masoller, over which tributary represents the legitimate source of the Quaraí River/Cuareim River. The UN does not officially recognize the claim.
Falkland Islands and South Georgia and the South Sandwich Islands	**United Kingdom**; Argentina	See Falkland Islands sovereignty dispute and South Georgia and the South Sandwich Islands sovereignty dispute.
French Guiana and Suriname involving the Maroni River	**France**; Suriname	See also: France–Suriname border The source tributary of the Lawa River between Suriname and French Guiana is disputed but beyond this either border reaches the same tripoint with Brazil. The Netherlands, and now Suriname, contend land up to the Malani to the east; France claims all land to the Litani River to the west.
New River Triangle (Tigri Area) involving the Courantyne River and the New River	**Guyana**; Suriname	The New River Triangle (also known as the Tigri Area) is a region within the Guiana Highlands that has been disputed by Suriname and Guyana since 1871. It involves the Courantyne River and the interpreted source of the river. In 1871, the New River as a tributary was discovered, the source of the disagreement.
Isla Brasilera/Ilha Brasileira	**Brazil**; Uruguay	Uruguayan officials claim that the island is part of their Artigas Department (the UN does not officially recognize the claim).
Several islands including Isla Suárez/Ilha de Guajará-mirim	**Bolivia**; Brazil	81 islands in the Rio Mamoré between Bolivia and Brazil are not assigned to any country. Isla Suárez is geographically closer to Bolivia, however economically dependent on the Brazilian city of Guajará-Mirim. Both countries signed a treaty in 1958 that keeps the island in a class of its own as per the status quo.
Southern Patagonian Ice Field	Argentina; Chile	From Mount Fitz Roy to Cerro Murallón the border remains undefined, while in the zone of Murallón and Cerro Daudet both countries already defined a border in 1998, but their respective cartographies differ.
Isla Santa Rosa	**Peru**; Colombia	A small island in the Amazon near the Colombian city of Leticia. It emerged around 1970, and was administered by Peru since then. In 2025, the Colombian government argued that the treaties set their shared border following the deepest points, so that by fate Santa Rosa and similar islets have tended to become Colombian.

=== Antarctica ===
The Antarctic Treaty, formed on 1 December 1959 and entered into force on 23 June 1961, is a key component for the management of Antarctica and helps provide administration for the continent, which is carried out through consultative member meetings.

Territory	Claimants	Antarctic territory
Area between 25°W and 53°W	Argentina; United Kingdom	Argentine Antarctica; British Antarctic Territory
Area between 53°W and 74°W	Argentina; Chile; United Kingdom	Argentine Antarctica; Antártica Chilena Province; British Antarctic Territory
Area between 74°W and 80°W	Chile; United Kingdom	Antártica Chilena Province; British Antarctic Territory

=== Asia ===
Map showing disputed territories of India

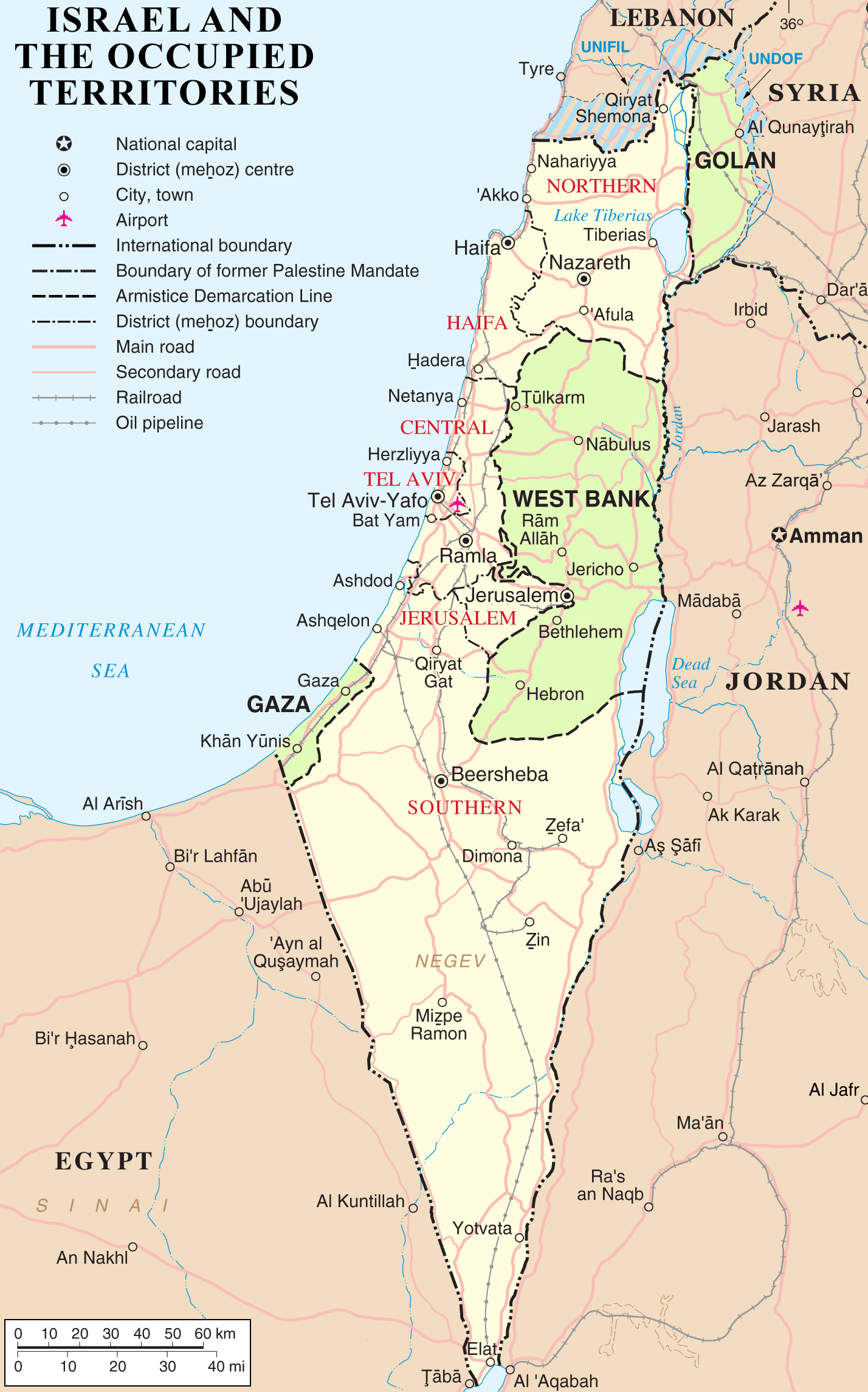
Israel and the Israeli-occupied territories, including the Golan Heights, the West Bank and East Jerusalem

Territory	Claimants	Notes
Mazraat Deir al-Ashayer	**Lebanon**; Syria	Mazraat Deir al-Ashayer is administered and controlled by Lebanon's Zahlé District, Beqaa Governorate, but claimed by Syria's Al-Zabadani District, Rif Dimashq Governorate.
Abu Musa	**Iran**; United Arab Emirates	In 1971, the Iranian navy took control of Abu Musa, at the time part of the Emirate of Sharjah. The Emirate of Sharjah later joined the United Arab Emirates, who therefore inherited an official claim on Abu Musa. As of 2022, this is an ongoing dispute, with Iran in control of the island since its takeover in 1971.
Greater and Lesser Tunbs	**Iran**; United Arab Emirates	Closely related to the dispute over Abu Musa, Iran had also around the same time seized control over the Greater and Lesser Tunbs while they were under control by the Emirate of Ras al-Khaimah. When Ras al-Khaimah joined the United Arab Emirates, the dispute was also inherited to the UAE. The dispute is still ongoing as of 2022.
Bukit Jeli	**Thailand**; Malaysia	
Azad Kashmir and Gilgit-Baltistan	**Pakistan**; India	Administered by Pakistan and claimed by India. Part of the Kashmir conflict.
Jammu and Kashmir and Ladakh	**India**; Pakistan	Part of the Kashmir conflict. Both India and Pakistan claim the former independent princely state of Jammu and Kashmir (today consisting of Jammu and Kashmir and Ladakh administered by India, and Gilgit-Baltistan and Azad Kashmir administered by Pakistan), leading to the India–Pakistan war of 1947–1948. A UN-mediated ceasefire put a halt to the conflict in January 1949. The UN resolution called for both the countries to demilitarise the region, following which a plebiscite would be held. However, no demilitarisation plan acceptable to both the countries could be agreed. The countries fought two further wars in 1965 and 1971. Following the latter war, the countries reached the Simla Agreement, agreeing on a Line of Control between their respective regions and committing to a peaceful resolution of the dispute through bilateral negotiations. An armed insurgency broke out in 1989 in the Indian administered part of Kashmir, demanding "independence". Pakistan has provided arms and training to the militants.
Junagadh and Manavadar	**India**; Pakistan	India annexed Junagadh (located within Gujarat) in 1947, shortly after the partition of India. Junagadh was one of the many princely states that was contested between India and Pakistan; Manavadar was a vassal state of Junagadh, alongside Babariawad and Mangrol. The dispute fell into obscurity over the next few years due to the prioritisation of the Kashmir conflict. In August 2020, Pakistan revived the decades-old dispute by highlighting "Junagadh and Manavadar" as a part of Pakistan in an official map on its "Survey of Pakistan" website. The dispute is largely symbolic in nature and is politically connected to the dispute over Kashmir, which is much more important to Pakistan.
David Gareja monastery complex	**Georgia**; Azerbaijan	Since the monastery complex is located on the border between Georgia and Azerbaijan, both parties have entered a dispute over which nation it belongs to.
Doi Lang	**Myanmar**; Thailand	
Fasht ad Dibal and Qit'at Jaradah	**Bahrain**; Qatar	These are island territories that are disputed between Qatar and Bahrain. Controlled by Bahrain, Qatar argues that the territories do not qualify as "islands" and hence are not covered by the International Court of Justice ruling (2001–2003) that handed them over to Bahrain.
Several areas in the Fergana Valley	Kyrgyzstan; Tajikistan; Uzbekistan	Most of the border in the area is still not demarcated. Kyrgyzstan: Barak is a tiny Kyrgyz village in the Fergana Valley region (where Kyrgyzstan, Tajikistan and Uzbekistan meet). In August 1999, the area around Barak was occupied by Uzbekistan. Barak became a de facto enclave only 1.5 km from the shifted main border. (Map) In August 2018, Kyrgyz and Uzbek authorities agreed to a land swap that would eliminate the exclave, claiming that the exchange process may take up to two years. As of a February 2022 report, only 85 percent of the land was traded, and then work stopped, leaving only 15 families to preserve Barak. Tajikistan: There are three Tajik exclaves, all of them in the Fergana Valley. One of them, the village of Sarvan, is surrounded by Uzbek territory, whereas the remaining two, the village of Vorukh and a small settlement near the Kyrgyz railway station of Kairagach, are each surrounded by Kyrgyz territory. Uzbekistan: There are four Uzbek exclaves, all inside Kyrgyz territory in the Fergana Valley. Two of them are the towns of Sokh and Shakhimardan and the other two the tiny territories of Chon-Qora and Jangail. There may be a fifth Uzbek exclave inside of Kyrgyzstan. In April 2021, a violent disagreement broke out in Isfara Valley, supposedly over the installation of surveillance cameras by the Tajiks at a water intake station of a reservoir. It escalated into an armed conflict that reached hundreds of civilian casualties. The area's dispute is mainly due to faulty allocation of resources during and after the breakup of the Soviet Union and its republics, leading to tense relations between nations over said allocation of resources, namely water. See also National delimitation in Central Asia
Ambalat	Indonesia; Malaysia	
Golan Heights	**Israel**; Syria	Syrian territory captured by Israel in 1967 (the Six-Day War), and unilaterally annexed by Israel in 1981. In 2008, a plenary session of the United Nations General Assembly voted by 161–1 in favor of a motion on the "occupied Syrian Golan" that reaffirmed support for UN Resolution 497; United Nations, 5 December 2008). During the Syrian civil war period, Ba'athist Syria had lost direct control of the Eastern Golan areas and retreated from cease-fire line with Israel (in favor of various opposition and Jihadist groups), though it did regain the area in 2018.
Shebaa Farms	**Israel**; Lebanon; Syria	
Israel within the Green Line	**Israel**; Palestine	See Israeli–Palestinian conflict; while the Palestine Liberation Organization recognizes "the right of the State of Israel to exist in peace and security", this recognition is rejected by several Palestinian factions (such as Hamas and the PIJ), including some within the PLO itself (such as the PFLP and DFLP).
West Bank and East Jerusalem	Israel Civilian rule by Israel proper applied in East Jerusalem Military occupation has jurisdiction over all matters in Area C and security-related matters in Area B Palestine has jurisdiction over all matters in Area A and civil matters in Area B	See Israeli occupation of the West Bank
Kalapani territory, Susta territory, part of Kuthi Valley and Antudanda	**India**; Nepal	Main article: Territorial disputes of India and Nepal Kalapani is administered by India while Susta is administered by Nepal. The few remaining border disagreements with Nepal since delineation was announced 98% complete in 2019.
The exclave Artsvashen of the Gegharkunik province	**Azerbaijan**; Armenia	Azerbaijan and Armenia have controlled these areas as part of the wider Nagorno-Karabakh conflict.
Karki exclave of the Nakhichevan Autonomous Republic	**Armenia**; Azerbaijan	Azerbaijan and Armenia have controlled these areas as part of the wider Nagorno-Karabakh conflict.
The three exclaves Barkhudarli, Sofulu and Yukhari Askipara of the Qazax District	**Armenia**; Azerbaijan	Azerbaijan and Armenia have controlled these areas as part of the wider Nagorno-Karabakh conflict.
North Korea	**North Korea**; South Korea	The Democratic People's Republic of Korea claims and administers only North Korea, as Article 2 of the Constitution of North Korea defines its territory as: "bordering the People's Republic of China and the Russian Federation to the north and the Republic of Korea to the south." The Republic of Korea administers only South Korea, but Article 3 of the Constitution of South Korea reads: "The territory of the Republic of Korea shall consist of the Korean peninsula and its adjacent islands."
Kuril Islands	**Russia**; Japan	After the end of World War II, the Japanese government renounced its claims of the sovereignty over the Kuril Islands (except for a few islands in the south) and South Sakhalin in The Treaty of San Francisco. However, since the Soviet Union did not sign that treaty and the treaty did not explicitly approve Russian sovereignty over these areas, the Japanese government has stated that attribution of these regions has not yet been determined. Therefore, they do not recognize Soviet rule in those areas (current the Russian Federation). For this reason, these lands are shown as No Man's Land in white color on most official maps in Japan.
Dokdo/Takeshima	**South Korea**; Japan	See also: Liancourt Rocks dispute The Liancourt Rocks, known as Dokdo in Korean and Takeshima in Japanese, are a set of disputed islets in the Sea of Japan. Japan claims sovereignty over the islets, pointing out the fact that in the San Francisco Peace Treaty of 1951, Dokdo/Takeshima was not included among the territories to be renounced by Japan. South Korea currently maintains control over the territory, which it has administered since June 1954. The status of Dokdo/Takeshima remains a point of contention between the two countries.
Islands in the Mekong river	Laos; Thailand	
Noktundo	**Russia**; South Korea	In 1990, the former Soviet Union and the Democratic People's Republic of Korea (North Korea) signed a border treaty which made the border run through the center of the Tumen river, leaving Noktundo as a former island in Russia. South Korea refused to acknowledge the treaty.
"Point 20"; a small area of land reclaimed from the sea by Singapore	**Singapore**; Malaysia	Malaysia claims the land was reclaimed in its territorial waters.
O'Tangav area (claimed as part of Stung Treng Province)	**Laos**; Cambodia	
Preah Vihear and adjacent area	**Thailand**; Cambodia	Temple complex awarded to Cambodia by an International Court of Justice ruling in 1962; "promontory" measuring 0.3 km^{2} immediately adjacent to temple awarded to Cambodia by ICJ ruling in 2013; both countries acknowledge continuing dispute over an additional 4.3 km^{2} immediately northwest of the 2013 ruling's area.
Part of Sabah (North Borneo)	**Malaysia**; Philippines	The Philippines retains a claim on the eastern part of Sabah (see North Borneo dispute) on the basis claimed by the Government of the Philippines that the territory is only leased by the former Sultanate of Sulu to British North Borneo Company, of which the Philippines argued that it should be the successor state of all Sulu past territories.
Saudi Arabia–United Arab Emirates border	Saudi Arabia; United Arab Emirates	
Siachen Glacier and Saltoro Ridge area	**India**; Pakistan	Controlled by India after Operation Meghdoot in 1984.
Sir Creek	India; Pakistan	A dispute over where in the estuary the line falls; only small areas of marsh land are disputed, but significant maritime territory is involved. It is divided mid-creek.
Parts of Three Pagodas Pass	Myanmar; Thailand	
The islands of Ukatnyy, Zhestky and Malyy Zhemchuzhnyy	**Russia**; Kazakhstan	
Ungar-Too (Ungar-Tepa) mountain	**Kyrgyzstan**; Uzbekistan	
Citrana Triangle	Indonesia; Timor-Leste	The claims of both countries refer to a 1904 Treaty signed in The Hague that refers to the mouth of the Noel Besi river. However, Indonesia claims the current path of the river which is more towards the east, while Timor-Leste adheres to the historical path (currently a small stream) to the west.

=== Europe ===
As of January 2023, Russian President Vladimir Putin cited recognition of Russia's sovereignty over the annexed territories (pictured) as a condition for peace talks with Ukraine.

Territory	Claimants	Notes
Crimea (including Sevastopol)	**Russia**; Ukraine	In 2014, Russia annexed the Crimean Peninsula in a disputed referendum. Russian ownership of Crimea is recognized by a minority of countries. The General Assembly Resolution 68/262 by votes 100 "in favor", 11 "against", 58 "abstained" and 24 abstentions noted that Crimea was part of Ukraine. Nonetheless, Crimea is practically a de facto subdivision of Russia as most of the control is in Russia's hands. Russia and Ukraine both divide Crimea into two subdivisions, including a "republic" (Ukraine's Autonomous Republic and Russia's Republic) and the independent city of Sevastopol (Ukraine's "special city" and Russia's "federal city").
Donetsk Oblast	Ukraine; Russia	See Russo-Ukrainian war (2022–present).
Kherson Oblast	Ukraine; Russia	See Russo-Ukrainian war (2022–present).
Luhansk Oblast	Ukraine; Russia	See Russo-Ukrainian war (2022–present).
Zaporizhzhia Oblast	Ukraine; Russia	See Russo-Ukrainian war (2022–present).
Outer Kinburn Peninsula; (located within Mykolaiv Oblast)	Ukraine; Russia	See Russo-Ukrainian war (2022–present).
Snihurivka's environs; (located within Ukraine's Mykolaiv Oblast)	**Ukraine**; Russia	This part of Mykolaiv was under Russia's control when Russian unilaterally annexed Kherson oblast, but Russia has since withdrawn during the Liberation of Kherson. During Russian control, a referendum was held in Snihurivka and in the surrounding area in which it joined Russia's Kherson Oblast; this referendum, whilst recognised by Russia, is not recognised by Ukraine.
Ivangorod/Jaanilinn and Pechorsky District/Petserimaa	**Russia**; Estonia	In 1917, the Autonomous Governorate of Estonia was formed by merging the governorates of Estonia and (parts of) Livonia. In the same year, a referendum was held in the midst of the Russian Revolution, joining Narva (and Ivangorod) to the governorate, which were previously part of Saint Petersburg Governorate. The south-eastern border was based on old provincial borders, which lay west of the present border. Under the 1920 Treaty of Tartu, the border of the newly established Republic of Estonia was set eastwards after border talks, incorporating the later-formed Petseri County. Estonia was occupied and annexed by the USSR in 1940. In 1944, decrees of the USSR Presidium of the Supreme Soviet, set the northeastern border along Narva river, re-ceding Ivangorod to Leningrad Oblast (but keeping Narva within the Estonian SSR) and select volosts/parishes of Petserimaa to Pskov Oblast. The Estonian constitution still references the 1920 treaty as the border. Repeated attempts to resolve the border dispute have de jure failed, as no border treaty has been ratified. The unratified agreement does, however, renounce Estonian claims to these lands, in addition to acknowledgements of the de facto situation by heads of state and government at various points.
Imia/Kardak	Greece; Turkey	Broad number of delimitation disputes about a.o. national airspace, territorial waters and exclusive economic zones. Includes Imia/Kardak dispute.
Akrotiri and Dhekelia	**United Kingdom**; Cyprus	Cyprus claims that the Sovereign Bases of Akrotiri and Dhekelia are a remnant of colonialism. On 30 June 2005 the House of Representatives of Cyprus unanimously adopted a resolution on the legal status of the base areas.
Mont Blanc summit	France; Italy	France asserts that the principal peaks on the Mont Blanc massif—Dôme du Goûter, Punta Helbronner, and Mont Blanc lie in French territory, while Italy asserts that the summits are shared.
Gibraltar	**United Kingdom**; Spain	Dispute over the interpretation of the Treaty of Utrecht and the location of the border.
Rockall Bank	Ireland; United Kingdom; Denmark; Iceland	Rockall is an uninhabited islet in the North Atlantic Ocean with disputed claims to its basin.
Olivenza and Villareal (including the Municipality of Táliga)	**Spain**; Portugal	In 1801, during the War of the Oranges, Spain, with French military support, occupied the territory of Olivenza (in Portuguese Olivença). During the Vienna Treaty, the signatory powers (including Spain) agreed with the Portuguese arguments concerning its claim on Olivenza but Spain never fulfilled its duty of giving the city of Olivenza and its territory back to Portugal.
Sections of Croatia-Serbia border	Croatia; Serbia	Limited areas along the Danube; Parts of Osijek-Baranja and Vukovar-Syrmia Counties and West and South Bačka Districts.
Island of Šarengrad	Serbia; Croatia	
Island of Vukovar	**Serbia**; Croatia	
Military complex near Sveta Gera	**Slovenia**; Croatia	The complex is in the area of Žumberak/Gorjanci
Sections along the Drina river	Bosnia and Herzegovina; Serbia	Sections along the Drina in dispute.
Mali Školj, Veliki Školj and the tip of the Klek peninsula	Bosnia and Herzegovina; Croatia	The temporary regime of the sea border between Croatia and Bosnia and Herzegovina was determined in 1999. The Neum Agreement on the temporary border was signed by Franjo Tuđman and Alija Izetbegović, and has not been ratified due to the emergence of the controversy surrounding the ownership of these two islands and the tip of the Klek peninsula. Croatia disputes the validity of the agreement and claims it as its own territory.
River island between Hrvatska Kostajnica and Kostajnica	Bosnia and Herzegovina; Croatia	Under Croatian control but is claimed by Bosnia and Herzegovina. A shared border crossing point has been built and has been functioning since 2003, and is used without hindrance by either party.
Prevlaka	**Croatia**; Montenegro	
An area on the Dragonja River	**Slovenia**; Croatia	Further information: Croatia–Slovenia border disputes
Areas along the border between Kosovo and Montenegro	Montenegro; Serbia	In 2015, Montenegro and the Republic of Kosovo erased a border dispute by setting a new border. Concluding, Serbia, which does not recognize Kosovo and thus not any treaties by the Republic of Kosovo, de jure claims the territory the Republic of Kosovo gave to Montenegro.

=== Oceania ===
Territory	Claimants	Notes
Matthew Island and Hunter Island	**France** **(New Caledonia)**; Vanuatu	
Minerva Reefs	**Tonga**; Fiji	Fiji claims that the entire reef is submerged at high tide, negating use of Minerva as a basis for any sovereignty or maritime EEZ claim by Tonga under the rules of UNCLOS.
Swains Island	**United States**; Tokelau	Tokelau's claim is unsupported by New Zealand, of which Tokelau is a dependency. New Zealand recognises US sovereignty over Swains Island.
Wake Island	**United States**; Marshall Islands	

== Ongoing disputes involving states with limited international recognition ==
Territorial claims around Greater China

Territorial claims in the South China Sea

=== Ongoing disputes involving the Republic of China ===
Since the end of the Chinese Civil War, the de facto territories of the Republic of China (Taiwan) are limited to the Taiwan Area. Meanwhile, the People's Republic of China (China) controls mainland China, Hong Kong and Macau. Officially, both the ROC and the PRC claim sovereignty over all of China (including Taiwan). According to ROC's Cross-Strait Act, Taiwan Area "refers to Taiwan, Penghu, Kinmen, Matsu, and any other area under the effective control of the Government" while mainland area "refers to the territory of the Republic of China outside the Taiwan Area". Per the Executive Yuan this refers to "areas under control of the Chinese Communists", i.e., the PRC, with some dated maps such as that inset, maintaining wider claims, in particular Mongolia.

Territory	Claimants	Notes
Aksai Chin and Depsang Plains	**China** (Note: Since the end of the Chinese Civil War in 1949, the de facto territories of the Republic of China (ROC) are limited to the Taiwan Area. Meanwhile, the People's Republic of China (PRC) controls mainland China, Hong Kong and Macau. Officially, both the ROC and the PRC claim de jure sovereignty over all of China (including Taiwan).); India	
Arunachal Pradesh	**India**; China	Controlled by India but claimed by the PRC which disputes the validity of the McMahon Line.
Chinese side of Baekdu Mountain	**China**; South Korea	Settled by the PRC and DPRK in 1962.
Beyul Khenpajong, the Menchuma Valley, and Chagdzom	**Bhutan**; China	
Bhutanese exclaves in western Tibet, namely Cherkip Gompa, Dho, Dungmar, Gesur, Gezon, Itse Gompa, Khochar, Nyanri, Ringung, Sanmar, Darchen, Doklam, and Zuthulphuk	**China**; Bhutan	
Demchok sector / Parigas region	India; China	
Chumar, Gue, Kaurik, Shipki La, Tashigang, Barahoti, Lapthal, Jadhang, Nelang, Pulam Sumda and Sang	**India**; China	Controlled by India but claimed by Zanda County, Ngari Prefecture, Tibet, China. Disputed areas located between Aksai Chin and Nepal.
James Shoal	**Malaysia**; China; Republic of China	The Republic of China would claim its southernmost point to be at 4°N.
Mainland China, Hong Kong, Macau, western half of Heixiazi, and Macclesfield Bank	**China**; Republic of China	Main article: Cross-Strait relations
Kinmen, Matsu, Pratas Island, and the Vereker Banks	**Republic of China**; China	The government of the People's Republic of China claims the entire island of Taiwan, as well as a number of minor islands, such as Penghu, Kinmen, and Matsu, that are controlled by the Republic of China. See also: Anti-Secession Law, Political status of Taiwan.
Kula Kangri and mountainous areas to the west of this peak, plus the western Haa District of Bhutan	Bhutan; China; Republic of China	
Paracel Islands	**China**; Republic of China; Vietnam	Entirely controlled by the People's Republic of China but claimed by the Republic of China and Vietnam.
Scarborough Shoal	**China**; Republic of China; Philippines	Controlled by the PRC since the 2012 Scarborough Shoal standoff.
Sakteng Wildlife Sanctuary	**Bhutan**; China	
Senkaku Islands (Diaoyu Tai or Diaoyu Dao)	**Japan**; China; Republic of China	Controlled by Japan but claimed by the PRC and ROC.
Spratly Islands	China; Republic of China; Vietnam; Philippines (part); Malaysia (part); Brunei (part)	Each of the claimant countries except Brunei controls one or more of the individual islands.
Taiwan and Penghu	**Republic of China**; China	In 1945, after the surrender of Japan, the Republic of China unilaterally annexed the islands of Taiwan and Penghu into its Taiwan Province, a move not recognized by the Allies. Shortly before the cessation of hostiles in the Chinese Civil War, the ROC government withdrew to the island of Taiwan, which remained under military occupation. Japan formally relinquished the claims to Taiwan and Penghu in 1952 under the Treaty of San Francisco. The sovereignty of Taiwan has remained in question to this day. See also the Political status of Taiwan.
Trans-Karakoram Tract, including Shaksgam Valley	**China**; India	Pakistan was originally a party to the dispute but relinquished its claim and accepted Chinese sovereignty over the area in 1963.
Island in the Yalu River (Note: The Republic of Korea (South Korea) does not recognize the Democratic People's Republic of Korea (North Korea).)	China; North Korea; South Korea	Generally held to have been resolved in 2005. North Korea is allocated all of the large islands in the lower Yalu River, including Pidan and Sindo at the mouth. The river's maritime rights remain shared between North Korea and the PRC.

=== Ongoing disputes involving other states with limited international recognition ===
Territory	Claimants	Notes
Abkhazia	**Abkhazia**; Georgia	Further information: Abkhaz–Georgian conflict
Eastern Ossetia (Truso Gorge, Ghuda Gorge, Kobi Plateau)	**Georgia**; South Ossetia	Ossetia claims two gorges and their connecting plateau, all controlled by Georgia as part of the Kazbegi Municipality, as "historically eastern Ossetian lands." South Ossetia claims to have attempted to press these claims during the Russo-Georgian War, but was deterred by Russia, with the issue flaring again in 2018 and 2019.
Northern Cyprus	**Northern Cyprus**; Cyprus	Northern Cyprus controls and administers the northern part of the island. The Republic of Cyprus claims the whole island.
Moldovan-controlled area of Dubăsari district	**Moldova**; Transnistria	
Kokkina/Erenköy exclave	**Northern Cyprus**; Cyprus	Northern Cyprus controls and administers Kokkina, an area separated from the rest of the main land on Northern Cyprus via the land controlled by the Republic of Cyprus.
Kosovo	**Kosovo**; Serbia	Kosovo is the subject of a territorial dispute between the Republic of Serbia and the de facto independent Republic of Kosovo. The latter declared independence on 17 February 2008, while Serbia claims it as part of its own sovereign territory. Its independence is recognized by 108 UN member states.
South Ossetia	**South Ossetia**; Georgia	Main article: Georgian–Ossetian conflict
Border checkpoint near Strovilia	United Kingdom; Northern Cyprus; Cyprus	Northern Cyprus controls and administers the border checkpoint near Strovilia. UK's claim in regard to its Sovereign Base Areas. This also involves Cyprus; the checkpoint is partially on UN-administered land, and Cyprus claims all of the island. (See: Europe)
Somaliland	**Somaliland**; Somalia	Somalia claims Somaliland as an integral part of its territory, considering it to be one of its federal member states, despite Somaliland being de facto independent. On 26 December 2025, Israel became the first country to recognise Somaliland.
Provinces of Sool, Sanaag and Cayn of Togdheer region	North Eastern State; Puntland; Somaliland	The dispute started in 1998, when Puntland was formed as an autonomous state of Somalia and declared the regions as part of its territory based on tribal affiliation of the locals. Puntland does not recognize the existence of North Eastern State as it considers all Dhulbahante-inhabited areas to be an integral part of its territory.
Transnistria (including Bender)	**Transnistria**; Moldova	
Varnita and Copanca	**Moldova**; Transnistria	
Western Sahara	Morocco; Sahrawi Republic	The United Nations keeps the Western Sahara in its list of non-self-governing territories and considers the sovereignty issue as unresolved pending a final solution. To that end, the UN sent a mission in the territory to oversee a referendum on self-determination in 1991, but it never happened. Administration was relinquished by Spain in 1976 except for management of the territory's airspace.

== Disputes over territorial waters ==
Territory	Claimants	Notes
Part of the EEZ generated by the Natuna Islands	China; Republic of China; Indonesia	The People's Republic of China claims the water off the Natuna Islands that fall under the nine-dash line claim are traditional Chinese fishing grounds. The Republic of China on Taiwan also claims the area.
EEZ in the Yellow Sea	China; South Korea	China and South Korea have overlapping claims for their exclusive economic zones in the Yellow Sea.
Okinotori EEZ	Japan; China; Republic of China; South Korea	Okinotori is an uninhabited atoll in the Philippine Sea. Japan claims that Okinotori is an islet, and accordingly claims a large exclusive economic zone (EEZ) around the island under the United Nations Convention on the Law of the Sea (UNCLOS). However, this classification has been contested by China, Taiwan, and South Korea, who contend that Okinotori does not meet UNCLOS's criteria for an islet of being able to support human habitation, and thus that Japan cannot claim an EEZ around the strategically located atoll.
Aves Island maritime boundary	Venezuela; Barbados; United Kingdom; Dominica; Saint Kitts and Nevis; Saint Lucia; Saint Vincent and the Grenadines	Caribbean states and the United Kingdom disagree with Venezuela's claim that Aves Island, a large sandbar with some vegetation, sustains human habitation or economic life, the criteria under the UN Convention on the Law of the Sea, which would permit Venezuela to extend its EEZ over a large portion of the eastern Caribbean Sea.
Caspian Sea	Kazakhstan; Russia; Turkmenistan; Azerbaijan; Iran	Russia, Kazakhstan, and Azerbaijan have bilateral agreements with each other based on median lines. However, Iran insists on a single, multilateral agreement among the five nations (aiming for a one-fifth share). Azerbaijan is at odds with Iran over some of the sea's oil fields. Occasionally, Iranian patrol boats have fired at vessels sent by Azerbaijan for exploration into the disputed region. There are similar tensions between Azerbaijan and Turkmenistan (the latter claims that the former has pumped more oil than agreed from a field, recognized by both parties as shared).
Beaufort Sea	Canada; United States	
Northwest Territories	Canada; United States	
Dixon Entrance	Canada; United States	
Northwest Passage and some other Arctic waters	Canada; United States	U.S. claims navigation rights
Strait of Juan de Fuca	Canada; United States	
Gulf of Venezuela and Los Monjes Archipelago surrounding waters	Colombia; Venezuela	Dispute regarding the undefined sea border between both countries.
Region of the Aegean Sea	Greece; Turkey	Broad number of delimitation disputes about a.o. national airspace, territorial waters and exclusive economic zones.
Carlingford Lough and Lough Foyle boundary	Ireland; United Kingdom	Lough Foyle divides County Donegal, Republic of Ireland, and County Londonderry, Northern Ireland. Carlingford Lough divides County Louth, Republic of Ireland, and County Down, Northern Ireland.
Dollart Bay	Germany; Netherlands	The exact course of the border through this bay is disputed, yet the countries have agreed to disagree by signing a treaty in 1960.
Lake Constance	Germany; Austria; Switzerland	Switzerland holds the view that the border runs through the middle of the lake. Austria is of the opinion that the contentious area belongs to all the states on its banks. Germany holds an ambiguous opinion.
Gulf of Piran	Slovenia; Croatia	An agreement was signed (and ratified by Croatia's parliament on 20 November 2009) to pursue binding arbitration to both the land and maritime portions of this continuing dispute. In 2015 collusion between the Slovenian judge on the arbitration panel and a representative from the Slovenian government was uncovered. The Croatian Sabor voted to withdraw from the arbitration, citing allegations of significant breaches of arbitration rules by Slovenia as the reason. Despite this the arbitration tribunal continued its work, issuing a ruling in 2017.
Somalia-Kenya Indian Ocean boundary dispute	Kenya; Somalia	In October 2021, the Somalia-Kenya Indian Ocean boundary dispute was decided by the International Court of Justice; the ruling adjusted the boundary slightly north of Somalia's claim giving Somalia the majority of the contested maritime territory, which is believed to contain rich oil and natural gas deposits; while the decision is legally binding, it has no enforcement mechanism, and Kenya has said it will not abide by it
Algerian-Spanish-Italian maritime border	Algeria; Spain; Italy	To benefit from the exclusive economic zone resources, especially the offshore hydrocarbons, Algeria decided to announce the later in March 2018 by Presidential Decree N° 18–96. But the differing viewpoints of the States with opposite coasts on the bases and rules used to draw the border line led to the overlap of the Algerian exclusive economic zone with the Spanish exclusive economic zone and the Italian ecological protection zone, which spawned a double border dispute. On the one hand, a dispute between Algeria and Spain. On the other hand, a dispute between Algeria and Italy.

== Ongoing boundary disputes within a state ==
Territory	Country	Internal claimants	Notes
Several islands in the Paraná River	Argentina	**Entre Ríos**; Santa Fe	Islands: Isla de los Mástiles/La Carlota, Isla Ingeniero Sabino Corsi Norte/Sur and Isla General Juan Pistarini.
As much as a 2,821 square kilometres (1,089 sq mi) area in and around the Ibiapaba mountain range	Brazil	**Ceará**; Piauí	This dispute originated in an 1880 imperial decree. In 1920 a solution to the dispute was arbitrated but in practice it was never carried out. In 2008 there were new attempted negotiations, but they broke down in 2011, and as of 2013 it is pending either a supreme court decision, a referendum or a possible mutual agreement.
Labrador-Quebec border	Canada	**Newfoundland and Labrador**; Quebec	On federal government maps, the border is drawn using Newfoundland and Labrador's claims.
The kebeles of Adaytu, Undufo, and Gedamaytu	Ethiopia	Afar; Somali Region	Main article: Afar–Somali clashes The three towns have long been fought over by the Issa clan Somalis, backed by the Somali Region government, against the Afar Region and Afar-allied militants. In 2014, the border between the two regions was redrawn by the federal government, placing the three ethnic Somali towns inside the Afar region. In the same year, the presidents of the two regions signed an agreement recognizing the three kebeles as special kebeles within the Afar Region which was rejected by the local people. Later in 2019, the Somali Region withdrew from the agreement, claiming the three areas again. The conflict between the two people has also spilled over into Djibouti.
Parts of the Baitarani River in Jharkhand	India	**Jharkhand**; Odisha	
Small areas in Balasore district and Mayurbhanj district	India	**Odisha**; West Bengal	
Belgaum	India	**Karnataka**; Maharashtra	Belgaum district was made a part of the Karnataka state following the States Reorganisation Act, 1956. However, Maharashtra claims the district and surrounding areas as predominantly Marathi-speaking and should be merged with Maharashtra.
Golaghat district, Jorhat district, and Sibsagar district	India	**Assam**; Nagaland	
Kotia villages in Koraput district	India	**Odisha**; Andhra Pradesh	
Langpih, Borduar, Nongwah, Matamur, Deshdemoreah Block I and Block II, and Khanduli	India	Assam; Meghalaya	
Lushai Hills	India	**Assam**; Mizoram	
Border between Manipur and Nagaland	India	**Mao Nagas** (Manipur); **Southern Angami Nagas** (Nagaland)	Main article: Mao–Southern Angami territorial dispute
Villages in Nabarangpur and Jharsuguda districts	India	**Odisha**; Chhattisgarh	
Phuldungsei	India	**Tripura**; Mizoram	
Four islands off the coast of Sumatra	Indonesia	**North Sumatra**; Aceh	Four small islands off the coast of Central Tapanuli Regency in North Sumatra were assigned to Aceh (Aceh Singkil Regency) in an agreement between the province's governors in 1992. However, the island remained under North Sumatran administration due to their close proximity to the North Sumatran regency of Central Tapanuli. The dispute was resolved in June 2025 after Prabowo Subianto, the current Indonesian president, took control of the issue and reaffirmed the 1992 agreements between the two provinces regarding four small islands that indeed belong to Aceh province. However, it still needs legal instruments such as a presidential decree.
Kapiraya area	Indonesia	Mimika; Deiyai; Dogiyai	The exact boundaries in the Kapiraya area, split between the regencies of Mimika, Deiyai, and Dogiyai in Central Papua province, are disputed. Since the discovery of gold in the area in 2023, the dispute has escalated into violence.
Territories of Northern Iraq	Iraq	Iraq proper Iraqi Kurdistan	Iraq's autonomous region of Iraqi Kurdistan claims and controls parts of the governorates of Nineveh, Erbil, Kirkuk and Diyala.
Areas south of Bonifacio Global City	Philippines	**Pinagsama**; Fort Bonifacio; Ususan; Western Bicutan; Post Proper Southside	The area, which consists of Manila American Cemetery and villages south of it, are claimed by Barangay Post Proper Southside. Even after the barangay's transfer of jurisdiction from Makati to Taguig in 2023 as a result of the Supreme Court ruling, the dispute persisted. The claimed area overlaps with Barangays Pinagsama, Ususan, Western Bicutan, and Fort Bonifacio. Post Proper Southside's de facto territory consists of multiple exclaves across the villages in Pinagsama, and the neighborhood along Consular Road inside BGC, where its Barangay Hall and Health Center are also located. On January 11, 2024, the barangay captain of Post Proper Southside had met with the captains of Pinagsama and Ususan as well as DILG Taguig to discuss the solution for this territorial dispute.
Baesa (Caloocan–Quezon City Boundary)	Philippines	Caloocan; Quezon City	The boundary line in Baesa has yet to be resolved between the two cities.
Caloocan–San Jose del Monte Boundary	Philippines	Caloocan; San Jose del Monte	Portions of Pangarap Village and Bankers Village that are once part of Tala Estate are claimed by San Jose del Monte. The lack of jurisdiction of the Commission on Settlement of Land Problems (COSLAP) resulted to the nullification of its decision. No significant updates since it was docketed on October 23, 2006.
Bagac–Mariveles boundary	Philippines	Bagac; Mariveles	The boundary of two Bataan towns, Bagac and Mariveles has been the subject of a boundary dispute involving a 4 km^{2} (1.5 sq mi) plot of land. The land is situated between barangay Biaan of Mariveles and barangay Quinawan of Bagac. The private owner of the land reportedly pays taxes to the Mariveles local government.
Bangui–Vintar boundary	Philippines	Bangui; Vintar	The boundary between the two towns involves land covering an area of 10.4996 km^{2} (4.0539 sq mi). In 1995, a memorandum of agreement was signed between the two towns resolving the boundary dispute in favor of Bangui. However, Vintar officials later said that there were "discrepancies" during the signing of the agreement.
Benguet–Ilocos Sur boundary	Philippines	Benguet; Ilocos Sur	The provincial borders between the towns of Mankayan in Benguet and Cervantes in Ilocos Sur are disputed which involves 1.47 km^{2} (0.57 sq mi) of overlapping land. The boundaries of Sugpon, Ilocos Sur and the Benguet towns of Bakun and Kibungan are also contested.
Bucarot	Philippines	**Adams**; Calanasan	The sitio is currently administered by Adams, Ilocos Norte but is claimed by the neighboring town of Calanasan in Apayao. Calanasan has appointed its own set of officials for the sitio and has also funded infrastructure in the contested area.
Calumpang	Philippines	**Mabalacat**; Bamban	Barangay Calumpang in the Sacobia area is contested by the two towns. Voter residents of the area are registered in Mabalacat and pay taxes to the town. Bamban claims Calumpang as a sitio of its San Vicente barangay and that Calumpang falls on the Tarlac side of the Sacobia River.
Cavinti-Kalayaan-Lumban boundary	Philippines	Cavinti; Kalayaan; Lumban	The Barangay Map of Cavinti indicates that the northeastern portion of Cavinti extends to the areas claimed by the municipalities of Lumban and Kalayaan as part of Barangay Lumot.
Elizabeth, Ferdinand, and portions of Cacafean	Philippines	**Marcos**; Nueva Era	The barangays of Ferdinand, Elizabeth, and parts of Cacafean are contested by the two Ilocos Norte towns. In 2017, Nueva Era laid claim to the disputed areas before the Sangguniang Panlalawigan of Ilocos Norte, which later ruled that the barangays are part of Nueva Era. This decision was supported by the Supreme Court. However the ruling of the decision is yet to be implemented as of February 2018.
Fort Bonifacio area (Bonifacio Global City and Embo barangays) and Barangays Butting, San Joaquin and Kalawaan	Philippines	**Pasig**; **Taguig**; Pateros; Makati (former)	Pateros lays claim to Bonifacio Global City and the Embo barangays, which were disputed between Makati and Taguig but later ruled by the Supreme Court to be under the latter's jurisdiction. Pateros also claims the same area along with three barangays in Pasig, namely Butting, San Joaquin, and Kalawaan. Pateros was allowed to pursue its claim by the Supreme Court despite its ruling involving Makati and Taguig.
Liwagao Island	Philippines	**Caluya**; Bulalacao	Bulalacao claims that Liwagao is part of its territory as per Presidential Decree No. 1801 of then-President Ferdinand Marcos and that Caluya has only "borrowed" Liwagao which was pursuing fugitives hiding in the island.
Malico	Philippines	**Santa Fe**; San Nicolas	Boundary dispute between the two municipalities. Santa Fe claims the territory of barangay Malico in San Nicolas. boundary dispute was already resolved by NAMRIA survey but was not recognize by the PLGU of Pangasinan under leadership of Governor Guivo, but the PLGU of Nueva Vizcaya insisted the validity of NAMRIA survey. The Nueva Vizcaya Provincial Board passed a resolution on September 21, 2022, urging San Nicolas officials to respect a memorandum of agreement between the National Mapping and Resource Information Authority (NAMRIA), Pangasinan and Nueva Vizcaya about twenty years ago. Both municipalities in both provinces have a barangay named Malico.
Saguitlang	Philippines	**Sison**; Tuba	The sitio of Saguitlang spans an area of 15.6 km^{2} (6.0 sq mi).
Sitio Bagong Silang	Philippines	**Muntinlupa**; Parañaque	The sitio of Bagong Silang occupies a former property of National Power Corporation spanning an area of 4.1 km^{2} (1.6 sq mi). It is currently under the jurisdiction of Barangay Sucat, Muntinlupa and is disputed with Barangay BF Homes, Parañaque.
Fiat Auto Poland factory and nearest areas	Poland	**Tychy**; Bieruń	The territory has historically been a part of the town of Bieruń. In years 1975–1991 Bieruń was a part of Tychy. The Fiat Auto Poland (formerly FSM factory) remaining in Tychy was a condition of Bieruń's separation. In the 90s, Bieruń has regained the Homera osiedle which was part of the disputed area.
Treviño enclave	Spain	**Province of Burgos**; Álava	The municipalities of Condado de Treviño and La Puebla de Arganzón are part of the Province of Burgos within the Castille and Léon community, whilst being completely surrounded by the Province of Álava within the Basque Country, being one of the few internal territorial discontinuities to survive the 1833 reorganization of Spanish internal divisions. The Basque claim the territory on cultural and territorial continuity grounds, while the Castillians argue for the status quo on historical grounds.
Abu Jaradil	Sudan	Central Darfur; South Darfur	Administratively, Abu Jaradil was disputed between Central Darfur and South Darfur. The dispute arose because the village was claimed by Salamat and Taʽisha tribes, thus causing unclear border demarcation between Central Darfur and South Darfur.
A wide section from the 35th parallel north to 2 kilometres (1.2 mi) south.	United States	**Tennessee**; Georgia	Based on an inaccurate measurement in 1818, the Georgia–Tennessee border does not match the 35th parallel, which was defined as the border by Congress in 1796. Georgia's claim would give it access to the Tennessee River and mitigate the impact of a severe drought. See Tennessee–Georgia water dispute.
California–Oregon border	United States	**Oregon**; California	Location errors in an 1868–1870 survey to demarcate the California–Oregon border created a dispute between Oregon and California, which upon statehood had established the 42nd parallel north as its de jure border, based on the 1819 Adams–Onís Treaty between the U.S. and Spain. The dispute continues to this day, as there are about 31,000 acres (13,000 ha) of disputed territory administered by Oregon, and about 20,000 acres (8,100 ha) administered by California. The border should follow the 42nd parallel straight west from the 120th meridian west to the Pacific. Instead it zigzags, and only one of the many surveyor's markers put down in 1868 actually is on the 42nd parallel.
New Mexico–Texas Panhandle border	United States	**Texas**; New Mexico	The border was defined as the 103rd meridian but an 1859 survey marked it too far west, mistakenly putting present-day towns of Farwell, Texline, and a part of Glenrio in Texas. New Mexico's draft constitution used the 103rd meridian as intended. The New Mexico Senate passed a bill to file a lawsuit to recover the strip, but it has not become law. The land and towns are administered by Texas.

== Historic disputes, subsequently settled ==
=== Africa ===
Territory	Former claimants	Dispute started	Dispute settled	Notes
Situngu Island	**Botswana**; Namibia	1977	2018	On 5 February 2018 a border treaty was signed between Botswana and Namibia which saw the island ceded to Botswana.
Ghana-Côte d'Ivoire maritime border	Ghana; Cote d'Ivoire	2007	2017	Dispute over maritime border.
Agacher Strip	Burkina Faso; Mali	1960	1986	Following repeated military clashes between Burkina Faso and Mali over the Agacher Strip, the International Court of Justice resolved the conflict in 1986 by dividing the disputed area approximately equally between the two countries.
Aouzou Strip, Libya–Chad Borderlands	**Chad**; Libya	1973	1994	In 1994, the International Court of Justice decision found in favour of Chad sovereignty over the Aouzou Strip and the Libya–Chad Borderlands, and ended the Libyan claim.
Badme	**Eritrea**; Ethiopia	1993	2018	Basis of the Eritrean-Ethiopian War which began in 1998. The territory was handed over to Eritrea following a joint statement at the Eritrea–Ethiopia summit in 2018.
Bakassi	**Cameroon**; Nigeria	1913	2006	This area was handed over by Nigeria to Cameroon following an International Court of Justice ruling and the Greentree Agreement.
Bure	**Ethiopia**; Eritrea	2002	2008	Eritrea has accepted the decision and no longer disputes this location.
Burkina Faso–Niger border	Burkina Faso; Niger	1960	2016	The International Court of Justice redefined the border between Burkina Faso and Niger in 2013. In 2015, the ruling was implemented by exchanging 18 towns between the two countries.
Kagera Salient	**Tanzania**; Uganda	1978	1979	In October 1978, Uganda invaded the Kagera Salient in northern Tanzania, initiating the Uganda–Tanzania War. The Ugandans met light resistance and in November President Idi Amin of Uganda announced the annexation of all Tanzanian land north of the Kagera River. The Tanzanians organised a counter-offensive later in November and successfully ejected the Ugandan forces from their country.
Part of the Kahemba region	**Angola**; Democratic Republic of Congo	2007	2007	Following a March 2007 report on the disputed area on the joint border in the Kahemba region, the Congolese interior minister admitted the territory was in fact part of Angola and agreed to send a technical team to demarcate the border along colonial era lines. The countries agreed to end the dispute in July 2007.
Lété Island and nearby islands in the Niger River	Niger; Benin	1960	2005	In 2005, the International Court of Justice awarded Lété and 15 of the other disputed islands to Niger, and the remaining nine islands to Benin.
Mbanie Island, Cocotiers and Congas Island	**Equatorial Guinea**; Gabon	2021	2025	Contested islands in Corisco Bay, valuable for their oil.
Northern Cameroon	Cameroon; UK	1961	1963	
Section of southern border and Sedudu Island	**Botswana**; Namibia	1890	1999	In 1999, the International Court of Justice awarded Sedudu to Botswana, ending the Namibian claim.
Parts of Tindouf Province and Béchar Province	**Algeria**; Morocco	1956	1989	Morocco (influenced by the Greater Morocco ideology) claimed that both Tindouf and Béchar historically belong to Morocco after they were annexed by France for the French colony of Algeria. Algeria wasn't supporting the claims since one of the FLN's primary objectives was to prevent France from splitting the strategic Sahara regions from a future Algerian state. It was therefore disinclined to support Morocco's historical claims to Tindouf and Bechar or the concept of a Greater Morocco. King Hassan II of Morocco visited Algiers in March 1963 to discuss the undefined borders, but Algeria's President Ahmed Ben Bella believed the matter should be resolved at a later date. Ben Bella's fledgling administration was still attempting to rebuild the country after the enormous damage caused by the Algerian War. Algerian authorities suspected that Morocco was inciting the revolt, while Hassan was anxious about his own opposition's reverence for Algeria, escalating tensions between the nations. These factors prompted Hassan to begin moving troops towards Tindouf leading to the Sand war which ended with no territorial changes. Morocco finally abandoned all claims to Algerian territory in 1972 with the Accord of Ifrane, though Morocco refused to ratify the agreement until 1989.
Tsorona-Zalambessa	**Ethiopia**; Eritrea	2002	2008	Eritrea has accepted the decision and no longer disputes this location.
Yenga (border hamlet), and left bank of Moa river	**Sierra Leone**; Guinea	1995	2013	The two heads of state settled this dispute in 2013.

=== Americas ===
Territory	Former claimants	Dispute started	Dispute settled	Notes
Gulf of Fonseca and the islands of Meanguera, Meanguerita and El Tigre Island.	Honduras; El Salvador; Nicaragua		1992	The ICJ determined that the three countries were to share control of the Gulf of Fonseca. El Salvador was awarded the islands of Meanguera and Meanguerita, and Honduras was awarded El Tigre Island.
Barbados-Trinidad and Tobago maritime border	Barbados; Trinidad and Tobago	1990	2006	In 1990, Venezuela and Trinidad and Tobago signed a maritime boundary treaty. The treaty purported to assign to Trinidad and Tobago ocean territory that Barbados claimed as its own. In 2004, Barbados elected to force the issue into binding arbitration. The tribunal's award was issued on 11 April 2006. The boundary was set nearly midway between the land of the two island countries.
Cayo Sur	**Honduras**; Nicaragua	2000	2007	In 2001, the two countries signed an agreement to ease the conflict in the presence of an Organization of American States ambassador; the case went before the International Court of Justice, which unanimously granted Honduras sovereignty over Cayo Sur and three other cays on 8 October 2007.
The islets of Pájaros, Pérez, and Chica	**Mexico**; United States	1884	1894	The islets of Pájaros, Pérez, and Chica were claimed by the U.S. under the Guano Islands Act in 1884. In response to a protest by Mexico, the U.S. claims were abandoned in 1894.
Cayo Arenas	**Mexico**; United States	1881	1894	Claimed by the U.S. under the Guano Islands Act in 1881. In response to a protest by Mexico, the U.S. claims were abandoned in 1894.
Swan Islands	**Honduras**; United States	1863	1972	U.S claim renounced in 1971 Treaty on the Swan Islands. The treaty entered into force on September 1, 1972.
Quita Sueño Bank, Roncador Bank and Serrana Bank	**Colombia**; United States		1981	Claimed by the United States under the Guano Islands Act until the Vásquez-Saccio Treaty of 1972 was signed which was ratified by the U.S. Senate in 1981.
Alaska-Canada border	United States; Canada	1821	1903	Disputed between the United States and Canada (then a British Dominion with its foreign affairs controlled from London). The dispute had been going on between the Russian and British Empires since 1821, and was inherited by the United States as a consequence of the Alaska Purchase in 1867. It was resolved by arbitration in 1903 with a delegation that included 3 Americans, 2 Canadians, and 1 British delegate that became the swing vote. By a 4 to 2 vote, the final resolution favored the American position. Canada did not get an outlet from the Yukon gold fields to the sea. The disappointment and anger in Canada was directed less at the United States, and more at the British government for betraying Canadian interests in pursuit of a friendly relationship between Britain and the United States.
Border between the British colony of New Brunswick and the U.S. state of Maine	United States; British North America	1838	1842	Disputed border between the state of Maine and the provinces of New Brunswick and Lower Canada.
Aves Island	**Venezuela**; Netherlands		1865	The Dutch authorities on Curaçao sat down with the Venezuelans and together decided to find a mutually acceptable sovereign to decide about the ownership of Aves Island. The Queen of Spain was accepted by both parties, and in 1865 Isabella II ruled on the issue, deciding in favor of the Venezuelans.
Aves Island	**Venezuela**; Dominica	1584	2006	Dominica abandoned the claim to the island in 2006, but continues to claim the adjacent seas, as do some neighboring states.
Atacama Desert border	**Bolivia**; Chile	1879	1904	
Tarija	**Bolivia**; Argentine Confederation		1899	In 1899, Argentina renounced its claims in exchange for the Puna de Atacama.
Belén de Bajirá	**Chocó**; Antioquia	2000	2017	The dispute between two Colombian departments began in 2000, when both Antioquia and Chocó claimed the corregimiento as part of their own respective municipalities. In 2014, amidst a rise of tensions between the claimants, the National Government under the Geographic Institute Agustín Codazzi (IGAC) formally started a process to find a solution for the dispute. IGAC awarded Belén de Bajirá to Chocó by 2017.
Guaíra Falls	Brazil; Paraguay	1872	1982	The disputed islands were submerged by the reservoir of Itaipú.
Section of US-Mexico border	United States; Mexico	1898	1963	Disputed border within the El Paso/Ciudad Juárez region.
Maryland and Pennsylvania border	Maryland; Pennsylvania	1730	1767	Dispute over the northern border of the Province of Maryland and southern border of Province of Pennsylvania, particularly west of the Susquehanna River. Settled by the drawing of the Mason–Dixon line.
Detroit Island, Plum Island, Rock Island and Washington Island	**Wisconsin**; Michigan		1936	The border between Wisconsin and Michigan was originally defined as "the most usual ship channel" into Green Bay from Lake Michigan but commercial routes existed both to the north and south of the island which led to a border dispute. In 1936, the U.S. Supreme Court decision Wisconsin v. Michigan found that the islands were part of Wisconsin.
New Hampshire Grants/Vermont	Province of New Hampshire (to 1776); State of New Hampshire (from 1776); Province of New York (to 1783); State of New York (from 1776); **Vermont** (from 1777)	1749	1791	In 1664 King Charles II decided the west bank of the Connecticut River was the eastern boundary of New York, so that that province included all of what later became the state of Vermont. During 1749–64, Governor Benning Wentworth of New Hampshire issued well over a hundred "grants", offering lands for sale west of the river in what would become Vermont. In 1764, King George III attempted to end the dispute by ruling that the region belonged to New York. But New York would not recognize the property claims of numerous settlers whose claims were based on Wentworth's grants, so local governments and militias resisted New York's rule. In 1777, the politicians of the disputed territory declared it independent of New York, Britain, and New Hampshire, calling it the State of Vermont. Vermont existed for 14 years as an unrecognized de facto independent country, considered by New York to be a district in rebellion. Negotiations between New York and Vermont in 1790 removed impediments to Vermont's admission to the Union in 1791.
Delaware Wedge	**Delaware**; Maryland; Pennsylvania	1750s	1921	A gore created when the borders of the colonies Maryland, Delaware, and Pennsylvania were defined. Dispute over the borders between the three colonies dates to the foundation of each during the middle 17th century. A series of defined lines and arcs were laid out by statute to settle the disputes, the most famous of which was the Mason–Dixon line. The Wedge was left out of all three colonies (and later U.S. states), and remained a matter of dispute until it was formally resolved to assign the Wedge to Delaware in 1921.
Eastern shore of the Narragansett Bay	**Colony of Rhode Island and Providence Plantations** (to 1776); **State of Rhode Island and Providence Plantations** (from 1776); Plymouth Colony (to 1691); Province of Massachusetts Bay (1691–1780); Commonwealth of Massachusetts (from 1780)	1636	1898	Claimed by both Rhode Island and Plymouth Colony. Plymouth's claim was inherited by the newly created province of Massachusetts Bay when the latter was created in 1691 from the merger of earlier Massachusetts Bay and Plymouth Colonies. A royal decree in 1746 assigned the land to Rhode Island, but Massachusetts continued to press its claim until 1898.
New York – New Jersey border	Province of New York; Province of New Jersey	1701	1756	Dispute over the southern border of Province of New York and the northern border of the Province of New Jersey. Raiding parties kidnapped and burned crops.
Isla Martín García	**Argentina**; Uruguay	1879	1973	After the Conquest of the Desert was launched in 1879, many indigenous leaders captured were confined there. The island was transferred to Argentine Navy jurisdiction in 1886. The island's distance from the Uruguayan territory is less than 3 km, and its jurisdictional status was formally established by the Treaty of Río de la Plata between Uruguay and Argentina on 19 November 1973.
Cordillera del Cóndor-Cenepa River	**Peru**; Ecuador	1828	1998	
Caquetá-Putumayo	Peru; Colombia	1821	1934	
Acre-Pando	Peru; Bolivia	1825	1909	
Argentina and Chile border	Argentina; Chile	1881	1902	After the signature of the Boundary treaty of 1881 between Chile and Argentina differing interpretations on whether the highest Andean peaks (favouring Argentina) or the continental divide (favouring Chile) was to be considered the boundary.
Plateau of Puna de Atacama	Argentina; Chile	1889	1898	
Clipperton Island	**France** Mexico	1897	1931	Disputed between France and Mexico. On 28 January 1931, King Victor Emanuel, selected as a neutral arbitrator, finally declared Clipperton to be a French possession, and it has remained relatively undisputed ever since.
Picton, Lennox and Nueva islands	Argentina; Chile	1898	1982	Main article: Beagle conflict
Brazil–France border	**Brazil**; France		1897	Main article: Amapá Question France did not recognize the Oyapock river as the border between French Guiana and the Brazilian province of Amapá. After the military confrontation, the territorial dispute was settled by an international court on 27 December 1897. The decision was favorable to Brazil, which maintained control over the disputed region. Walter Hauser, president of Switzerland, served as arbitrator. On 1 December 1900, Hauser issued a report favoring Brazil.
Section of the Argentina-Chile border	Argentina; Chile	1913	1966	Río Encuentro-Alto Palena dispute
Brazil-British Guiana border	British Guiana; Brazil	1842	1904	See also: Brazil–Guyana border See also: Pirara dispute In 1842, a Brazilian ambassador went to London to suggest that the dispute be submitted to neutral arbitration. The United Kingdom and Brazil signed a treaty on 6 November 1901, agreeing to arbitration to establish the boundary between northern Brazil and British Guiana. A decision was taken by King Victor Emmanuel III of Italy to resolve the Pirara Question, in which 19,630 square kilometres (7,580 sq mi) would be handed over to British Guiana, and 13,570 square kilometres (5,240 sq mi) would be returned to Brazil, thus defining the limits of the border.
Laguna del Desierto	**Argentina**; Chile	1949	1994	
Missouri	**United States**; Confederate States	1861	1865	After the Missouri secession, the State of Missouri was claimed by both the United States and Confederate States until the defeat of the Confederacy in the American Civil War
Border of New Hampshire and Canada	**United States**; United Kingdom	1783	1842	Ill-defined terms of the Treaty of Paris at the end of the Revolutionary War left the boundary of the state of New Hampshire and Canada in doubt. The lack of a precise definition of the "northwesternmost head of the Connecticut River" as defined by the Treaty of Paris left the land that is now the town of Pittsburg, New Hampshire within the conflicting jurisdiction of both the United States and Great Britain. In 1832 residents of the area established the short-lived Republic of Indian Stream in the area; the minuscule population of the putative nation never exceeded about 300. The boundary was finally settled definitively by the Webster–Ashburton Treaty of 1842.
Southern edge of Labrador	**Dominion of Newfoundland**; Canada	1763	1927	This was formerly an international dispute between Canada, which includes Quebec, and the Dominion of Newfoundland, then an independent country. The case came before the Judicial Committee of the Privy Council in London, which in March 1927 delivered a win for Newfoundland and granted it the disputed land. The decision was further recognized by the governments of Canada and of Newfoundland when the latter joined Confederation in 1949 as the tenth province of Canada. Quebec has never accepted the border.
Sverdrup Islands	Norway; **United Kingdom**	1928	1930	In 1928, Norway asserted its claim of sovereignty over the Sverdrup Islands. The islands are named after Norwegian explorer Otto Sverdrup, who explored and mapped them from 1898 to 1902 with the vessel Fram, although some were previously inhabited by Inuit. Sverdrup claimed the islands for Norway, but the Norwegian government did not pursue the claim until 1928. At that point, the Norwegian government raised the claim, primarily to use the islands as bargaining chips in negotiations with the United Kingdom over the status of the Arctic island Jan Mayen and the Antarctic Bouvet Island. On 11 November 1930, Norway ceded the Sverdrup Islands to Canada, in exchange for British recognition of Norway's sovereignty over Jan Mayen.
San Andrés and Providencia, Bajo Nuevo Bank, and Serranilla Bank	**Colombia**; Nicaragua; Jamaica	1886	2012	Jamaica implicitly withdrew its claim by accepting the nautical chart affixed to a 1993 treaty that established a Joint Regime Area with Colombia, excluding Bajo Nuevo Bank and Serranilla Bank. Honduras and the United States continue to dispute sovereignty over both banks.
Chile-Peru border	**Chile**; Peru	1883	1929	See also: Treaty of Lima (1929)
Chile-Peru maritime border	**Chile**; Peru	1985	2014	Part of the broader territorial dispute.
Erik the Red's Land	**Denmark**; Norway; Iceland	1931	1933	
Isla Portillos	**Costa Rica**; Nicaragua	2010	2018	On 2 February 2018, the ICJ rendered a decision in a border dispute between Nicaragua and Costa Rica regarding Isla Portillos. Nicaragua was left with just the Laguna Los Portillos and its short strip of beach. The court also decided that the sea just outside of the lagoon would be Costa Rican waters. The ICJ concluded that the whole beach is Costa Rican except for the part directly between the lagoon and the Caribbean Sea – now a tiny enclave of Nicaraguan territory separated from the rest of the country.
Hans Island	Canada; Denmark (Greenland)	1972	2022	Claimed by both Canada and the Kingdom of Denmark (on behalf of Greenland). Resolved by treaty splitting the island between Canada and Greenland.
Oyster Pond	Netherlands; France	2016	2023	Claimed by both The Kingdom of the Netherlands (on behalf of Sint Maarten) and France (on behalf of Saint Martin). Resolved by agreement splitting the bay in the middle. As of July 2026 the treaty has yet to enter into force due to neither government having officially approved it.

=== Antarctica ===
Territory	Former claimants	Dispute started	Dispute settled	Notes
Bouvet Island	**Norway**; United Kingdom	1927	1929	The United Kingdom claimed this Antarctic island as Lindsay/Liverpool Island based on sightings going back to 1808, but Norway landed there in 1927. In November 1929, Britain renounced its claim to the island.

=== Asia ===
Territory	Former claimants	Dispute started	Dispute settled	Notes
Israeli–Lebanese maritime border	Israel; Lebanon	2010	2022	
Syngman Rhee Line	**South Korea**; Japan	1952	1965	The Syngman Rhee Line was a marine boundary line established on January 18, 1952, proclaiming a wide area of maritime sovereignty around the entire Korean Peninsula. The proclamation asserted that the "Government of the Republic of Korea holds and exercises the national sovereignty" over the maritime area. Clarifications were made noting that the Proclamation stated it "does not interfere with the rights of free navigation on the high seas" so the Proclamation did not "mean extension of territorial waters into the high seas". The line was abolished in 1965 with the signing of a Japanese–South Korean fishing agreement.
Bahrain and its Dependencies	British Empire; Iran	1820	1971	The claim ended with a resolution approved by the lower house on 14 May 1971 with 184 votes to 4, and unanimously approved by the upper house on 18 May 1971; and Iran recognized Bahrain as an independent sovereign state.
Boston–Lingig boundary	**Boston, Davao Oriental**; Lingig, Surigao del Sur	1992	2020	Davao Oriental and Surigao del Sur settled a boundary dispute between their two towns; Boston (Davao Oriental) and Lingig (Surigao del Sur). The dispute was resolved through a common ordinance passed by the two provincial governments which delineate the boundaries between the two towns ceding territory in favor of Boston excluding existing build-up areas under Barangay Rajah Cabungsuan of Lingig, Surigao del Sur. 26 km^{2} (10 sq mi) out of the 60 km^{2} (23 sq mi) disputed territory is determined to be under Davao Oriental.
Bagu–Cabiten boundary	Bagu, Bakun, Benguet; Cabiten, Mankayan, Benguet	–	2015	Border dispute between the barangays of Bagu in Bakun town and Cabiten in Mankayan town. Both of the towns are part of Benguet province. Efforts to resolve the dispute date as early as 1999 during the tenures of Bakun Mayor Tico Dalmones of Bakun and Mankayan Mayor Manalo Galuten. Five corners were identified in as demarcating points of the barangay borders. The dispute was resolved in 2015.
Cabagsac–Pinpin boundary	**Cabagsac, Pampanga**; Pinpin, Pampanga	–	1700s	Two towns in Pampanga province had a land dispute which was settled in court in favor of Cabagsac. Cabagsac was renamed as San Luis after the wife of the lawyer which represented the town in the land dispute. Pinpin is now known as Santa Ana.
Caloocan–Malabon boundary	Libis Baesa, Caloocan; Potrero, Malabon	2001	2014	Both the city governments of Caloocan and Malabon agreed to develop 80 hectares (200 acres) of disputed land, preempting any court decisions. This dispute began when Malabon became a highly urbanized city, taking over the lands formerly part of Caloocan.
Sudipen–Tagudin boundary	Sudipen, La Union; Tagudin, Ilocos Sur	–	2015	A century-old boundary dispute between the towns of Sudipen, La Union and Tagudin, Ilocos Sur was resolved in 2015. The towns agreed on a boundary established along the Amburayan River.
Bicutan Market and Interchange (Parañaque–Taguig boundary)	**San Martin de Porres, Parañaque**; North Daang Hari, Taguig	2001	2001?	The area has been under the de facto administration of Parañaque since the dialogue.
Cotabato City	Bangsamoro; Cotabato City (claims not to be part of Bangsamoro)	2019	2023	Cotabato City Mayor Cynthia Guiani-Sayadi has opposed the inclusion of Cotabato City (formerly part of the Soccsksargen region) in the Bangsamoro after most of its residents favored to ratify the Bangsamoro Organic Law in the 2019 plebiscite which created the autonomous region. Guiani-Sayadi filed an electoral protest seeking to nullify the results claiming that residents who opposed the law were prevented to vote due to threats and intimidation from supporters and attempted to delay the turnover of the city to the Bangsamoro regional government. Guiani-Sayadi lost to Bruce Matabalao in the 2022 mayoral elections. The new city council under the Matabalao's administration formally affirmed Cotabato City's inclusion while the petition by the former city administration was pending. The Supreme Court affirmed the city being part of the autonomous region in January 2023 and found insufficient evidence to support fraud which allegedly happened during the plebiscite.
Fort Bonifacio area (Bonifacio Global City and Embo barangays)	**Taguig**; Makati	1993	2023	Includes the Bonifacio Global City and the EMBO (Enlisted Men's Barrio) barangays, which is recognized by the Supreme Court of the Philippines as part of Taguig.
Ambos Camarines-Tayabas Boundary (East Quezon): Kagtalaba; Plaridel (also called Macahadoc); Kabuluan (also spelled as Cabuluan following Tayabas Tagalog); Don Tomas; Guitol; Tabugon; Maulawin; Patag Ibaba; Patag Iraya (also spelled Ilaya in Tayabas Tagalog)	**Santa Elena, Camarines Norte**; Calauag, Quezon	1930s	2001	In October 1991, Quezon Governor Eduardo Rodriguez and Calauag Mayor Julio Lim caused the removal of the marker. Throughout the proceedings, Government agencies including the Department of Budget and Management, COMELEC, and the National Statistics Office recognized the jurisdiction of the town of Santa Elena, Camarines Norte over the 9 barangays. In 2000, Judge Regino held Governor Rodriguez and Mayor Lim guilty of contempt, with a maximum imprisonment of 6 months as well as a fine of ₱1,000 for the erection of a new boundary marker. Gateway to Bicolandia Boundary Arch was constructed to replace the former boundary mark.
Katchatheevu	**Sri Lanka**; India	1920	1974	The dispute on the status of the island of Kachatheevu was settled in 1974 by an agreement between both countries. But still some cases are ongoing in High Court of Madras which are filed earlier regarding this dispute stating as illegally issued to Sri Lanka. Several actions were still taken by the union government of India to retrieve that island back to Indian territory once again.
Great Rann of Kutch	India; Pakistan	1965	1968	In January 1965, Pakistan claimed the area of the Great Rann of Kutch on the basis of the Sindh province, eventually launching an operation in the area in April 1965. Later the same year, Prime Minister of the United Kingdom Harold Wilson persuaded the combatants to end hostilities and establish a tribunal to resolve the dispute. A verdict was reached in 1968 which saw Pakistan getting 10% of its claim of 9,100 square kilometres (3,500 sq mi). 90% was retained by India.
Middle Rocks	**Malaysia**; Singapore	1993	2008	Middle Rocks was a dispute that arose when Singapore claimed both islets in 1993. The matter was settled by the International Court of Justice in 2008, which ruled that Middle Rocks belonged to Malaysia.
Pedra Branca	**Singapore**; Malaysia	1979	2018	
Tiran and Sanafir Islands	Ottoman Empire (1906-1918) Kingdom of Hejaz (1918–1926) Nejd (1926–1932) **Saudi Arabia** (1932–2017); Egypt; Israel (1967–1982)	1906	2017	These islands were transferred to Saudi Arabia in 2017.
Arabi Island and Farsi Island	Iran; Saudi Arabia	1968	1968	These islands were disputed between Iran and Saudi Arabia. In 1968 Iran and Saudi Arabia had an agreement that Farsi island be given to Iran and Arabi island be given to Saudi Arabia.
Bay of Bengal maritime boundary between Bangladesh and India	India; Bangladesh	1974	2014	India and Bangladesh had engaged in eight rounds of bilateral negotiations starting 1974 but it remained inconclusive until 2009. In October 2009, Bangladesh served India with notice of arbitration proceedings under the UNCLOS. The Arbitration Tribunal delivered the ruling on 7 July 2014 and settled the dispute.
Indo-Bangladesh enclaves, adverse possessions and undemarcated land boundaries	India; Bangladesh	1947	2015	Following the Partition of Bengal in 1947, the issues of adverse possessions, enclaves and unmarked boundary arose. Inside the main part of Bangladesh, there were 111 Indian enclaves (69.45 km^{2}), while inside the main part of India, there were 51 Bangladeshi enclaves (28.77 km^{2}). In 1974 Bangladesh approved a proposed treaty, Land Boundary Agreement, to exchange all enclaves within each other's territories, but India did not ratify it. Another agreement was agreed upon in 2011 to exchange enclaves and adverse possessions. With respect to adverse possessions, India received 7,110.2 acres of land and transferred 17,160.63 acres to Bangladesh. India ratified the agreement by constitutional amendment in May 2015.
Muhurichar river island	India; Bangladesh	1974	2011	Historically controlled by India but claimed by Bangladesh, disputed from approximately 1974. An agreement was reached on the demarcation of the border in the area in 2011, and in 2019 the Indian government confirmed that it no longer had any outstanding boundary dispute with Bangladesh.
South Talpatti/New Moore/Purbasha Island	**India**; Bangladesh	1975	2010	This former dispute over a small island never more than two meters above sea level was contested from the island's appearance in the 1970s to its disappearance, likely due to climate change, in the first decade of the 2000s. Though land disputes no longer exist, the maritime boundary was not settled until 2014.
North Sakhalin Island	Russian Empire; Empire of Japan	1845	1875	Japan unilaterally proclaimed sovereignty over the whole island in 1845, but its claims were ignored by the Russian Empire. The 1855 Treaty of Shimoda acknowledged that both Russia and Japan had joint rights of occupation to Sakhalin, without setting a definite territorial demarcation. As the island became settled in the 1860s and 1870s, this ambiguity led to increasing friction between settlers. Attempts by the Tokugawa shogunate to purchase the entire island from the Russian Empire failed, and the new Meiji government was unable to negotiate a partition of the island into separate territories. In 1875 by the Treaty of Saint Petersburg, Japan agreed to give up its claims on Sakhalin in exchange for undisputed ownership of the Kuril Islands. In 1905 under the Treaty of Portsmouth Japan gained Sakhalin to the 50th parallel, but lost it again in 1945.
Palmas Island (modern-day Miangas Island)	Philippines; Dutch East Indies	1906	1928	Dispute between the United States and the Netherlands over the Palmas island located south of the Philippines, which was then American territory. The Netherlands believed that the islands were part of the Dutch East Indies. The territorial dispute was solved through the Island of Palmas case which decided that the Palmas Island belongs to the Netherlands. Palmas Island, now Miangas Island, is a part of modern Indonesia.
Trans-Karakoram Tract, including Shaksgam Valley	Pakistan (still claimed by: India; **China**; Republic of China)	1947	1963	Pakistan relinquished its claim to the People's Republic of China; India did not.
Sinai Peninsula	Israel; **Egypt**	1967	1982	During the Six-Day War Israel claimed Sinai. It was returned in 1982 under the terms of the 1979 Egypt–Israel peace treaty.
Taba	Israel; **Egypt**	1979	1989	When Egypt and Israel were negotiating the exact position of the border in preparation for the 1979 peace treaty, Israel claimed that Taba had been on the Ottoman side of a border agreed between the Ottomans and British Egypt in 1906 and had, therefore, been in error in its two previous agreements. Although most of Sinai was returned to Egypt in 1982, Taba was the last portion to be returned. The issue was submitted to an international commission. In 1988, the commission ruled in Egypt's favour, and Israel returned Taba to Egypt in 1989.
Phú Quốc island and Thổ Chu Islands area	**Vietnam**; Cambodia	1939	1982	In 1939, Governor General of Indochina, Jules Brévié, sent a letter to the Governor of Cochinchina about "the issue of the islands in the Gulf of Siam whose is a matter of controversy between Cambodia and Cochin-China". In this letter,"for administrative purposes", he drew a line which defined the border between the waters of Cambodia and Cochin-China: all the islands north of the line are under Cambodian sovereignty, all the islands south of the line are ruled by Cochin-China. As a result, Phú Quốc was under Cochinchina administration. In 1949, Cochin-China became part of Vietnam, an Associated State in the French Union within the Indochinese Federation. After the Geneva Accords, in 1954, its sovereignty was handed over to the State of Vietnam. In 1964, then Head of State Prince Norodom Sihanouk proposed to the Vietnamese a map aimed at settling the issue. Cambodia offered to accept the colonial “Brévié Line” as the maritime boundary, thus abandoning its claim. That position of Cambodia was confirmed by maps given to the mission sent by the UN Security Council after the Chantrea incidents. On 8 June 1967, the Vietnamese issued a declaration that accepted the “Brévié Line” as the maritime border. On 1 May 1975, a squad of Khmer Rouge soldiers raided and took Phú Quốc, but Vietnam soon recaptured it. This was to be the first of a series of incursions and counter-incursions that would escalate to the Cambodian–Vietnamese War in 1979. Cambodia dropped its claims to Phú Quốc in 1976. But the bone of contention involving the island between the governments of the two countries continued, as both have a historical claim to it and the surrounding waters. A July 1982 agreement between Vietnam and the People's Republic of Kampuchea ostensibly settled the dispute; however, it is still the object of irredentist sentiments.
Turtle Islands	(Philippines) Philippine Islands; North Borneo	1930	1930	Dispute between the United States and the United Kingdom over the Turtle Islands located south of the Philippines, which was then American territory. In a 1930 treaty the United Kingdom acknowledged American sovereignty over the islands and was agreed upon that the British would remain administering the island until the United States express interest to take over control over the islands after a one-year notice. When the Philippines gained full independence from the United States in 1946, the Philippines invoked the treaty and the British turned over the islands to the Philippines in 1947.
West Bank, including East Jerusalem	Israel; Jordan	1967	1988	During the Six-Day War, Israel conquered these territories from Jordan. Jordan later renounced the claim on the territory, supporting instead its inclusion in a future Palestine.
Ligitan and Sipadan	**Malaysia**; Indonesia	1969	2002	The 2002 International Court of Justice ruling awarded both islands to Malaysia, but left unsettled the maritime boundary immediately southwest and west of the islands between Malaysia and Indonesia.
Hawar Islands	Qatar; Bahrain	1971	2001	Formerly disputed between Qatar and Bahrain, it was settled by the International Court of Justice (ICJ) in The Hague. In the June 2001 decision, Bahrain kept the Hawar Islands and Qit'at Jaradah but dropped claims to Janan Island and Zubarah on mainland Qatar, while Qatar retained significant maritime areas and their resources. The agreement has furthered the goal of definitively establishing the border with Saudi Arabia and Saudi-led mediation efforts continue.
Batek Island	**Indonesia**; Timor-Leste	2002	2004	Timor-Leste conceded its claim to the island to Indonesia in August 2004.
11,000 square miles (28,000 km^{2}) of territory in Xinjiang	Pakistan (still claimed by: **China**; Republic of China)	1947	1963	Pakistan relinquished its claim to the People's Republic of China.
Aksai Chin	Pakistan (still claimed by: India; **China**; Republic of China)	1947	1963	Pakistan relinquished its claim to the People's Republic of China; India did not.
Demchok sector	Pakistan (still claimed by: India; China; Republic of China)	1947	1963	Claimed as part of the princely state of Kashmir.
Chumar	Pakistan (still claimed by: **India**; China; Republic of China)	1947	1963	Claimed as part of the princely state of Kashmir. Pakistan relinquished its claim to the People's Republic of China; India did not.
3,700 square miles (9,600 km^{2}) of territory in Gilgit-Baltistan, and the Siachen Glacier	**Pakistan**; China; Republic of China); India	1960	1963	The People's Republic of China relinquished its claim to Pakistan. India and the Republic of China did not.
Saudi Arabia–Yemen border	Saudi Arabia; Yemen	1934	2000	Settled by the Treaty of Jeddah (2000).
Limbang District	**Malaysia**; Brunei	1967	2010	Limbang District was part of Brunei until it was forced to cede it to the Raj of Sarawak in 1890. Since then Brunei is divided territorially into two. It was claimed by Brunei in 1967 to reconnect the country. It forms the main part of the Brunei–Malaysia border#Disputes. Malaysia claimed to settle the issue in 2009, however this was disputed by Brunei. Malaysia in 2010 ceded two hydrocarbon concession blocks to Brunei in exchange for Brunei dropping claims to Limbang.
Hanish Islands	**Yemen**; Eritrea	1995	1999	In December 1995, Eritrea entered into a dispute with Yemen over claims to the Hanish Islands and fishing rights in the Red Sea. This dispute was resolved in 1999 when the islands were awarded to Yemen through international arbitration, and the Eritreans complied with the verdict.
Shatt al-Arab	**Iran**; Iraq	1936	1988	Settled by the 1975 Algiers Agreement. Reneged on by Iraq in 1980, but re-agreed to in 1988.
Makati–Taguig boundary	**Taguig**; Makati; Pateros	1983	2023	Taguig claimed more than 7.29 square kilometres (2.81 sq mi) of land in Fort Bonifacio, an area formerly administered by Makati. On 5 August 2013, the Court of Appeals Sixth Division ruled that Makati had legal jurisdiction over the area, thus invalidating Taguig's claim. Taguig did not abandon its claims and petitioned the Court of Appeals to have the decision revoked. Pateros also claimed the area and filed a petition before the Taguig Regional Court Branch 271 in 2012 concerning its claim. Pateros reiterated its claims in 2013 following the decision of the Court of Appeals awarding Makati jurisdiction over the area. The Supreme Court finally ruled in favor of Taguig in 2023, and the ruling began to be implemented in that year's elections.
Certain islands in the Naf River, St. Martin's Island	**Bangladesh**; Myanmar	1971	2019	The dispute dates back to the independence of Bangladesh. The two countries agreed on Bangladeshi sovereignty over St. Martin's Island in 1974, but a maritime dispute continued. Marked by sporadic border violence, including the Tatmadaw shooting Bangladeshi fishermen, the maritime dispute was solved in 2012 by an ITLOS ruling. Then, in 2018, a diplomatic incident occurred when the Burmese government released an official map depicting St. Martin's Island as Burmese territory. Myanmar subsequently acknowledged Bangladeshi sovereignty over St. Martin's Island and finally removed it from its official map by 2019.
Assam-Arunachal Pradesh border	Assam; Arunachal Pradesh	1951	2023	The dispute between the two Indian states spanned 1,200 points and contained 123 villages, dating as far back as a 1951 single-member commission land transfer recommendation when Arunachal Pradesh was the North-East Frontier Agency. In April 2023, both states signed a memorandum of understanding to jointly demarcate their border. By September 2023, 115 villages went to Arunachal Pradesh and 8 villages went to Assam.
Kuwait-Saudi Arabia border, Qaruh, and Umm al Maradim	Ottoman Empire (until 1918); United Kingdom (until 1961); Kuwait (1961–2019); Nejd (1919–1932); Saudi Arabia (1932–2019); Iraq (1990–1994)	1913	2019	The dispute dates as far back as when the United Kingdom and Ottoman Empire signed the Anglo-Ottoman Convention of 1913, defining the border in two phases: a formal boundary as well as a British "sphere of influence". This agreement was never ratified due to major complications: the Ottoman Empire had no de facto control over any of the area, because the Sheikhdom of Kuwait was effectively a British protectorate, Najd Sanjak was occupied by the Emirate of Nejd and Hasa, and the signatories proceeded to fight against each other in World War I, which ended in the dissolution of the Ottoman Empire. From 1919 to 1920, the Saudis attempted to annex Kuwait in the Kuwait-Najd War, which ended in the Uqair Protocol of 1922. The Protocol defined a "neutral zone" between the Sheikhdom of Kuwait and Sultanate of Nejd. The State of Kuwait inherited the United Kingdom's territorial claim when it gained independence in 1961. In 1965, a separation line was drawn halfway through the neutral zone; Qaruh and Umm al Maradim are north of the line. Kuwait interpreted as the de jure border but Saudi Arabia recognized it only as de facto, leaving the sovereignty of the northern half of the "neutral zone" in question. In 1990, Ba'athist Iraq invaded Kuwait; the Republic of Kuwait was declared and annexed into Iraq, causing the Gulf War. Kuwaiti and Coalition forces recaptured Qaruh and Umm al-Maradim in one of the first battles of the war, which ended in total Iraqi defeat and withdrawal of Iraq's territorial claim. Finally, in 2019, Kuwait and Saudi Arabia signed a memorandum of understanding in which Saudi Arabia recognized the separation line as a permanent international border.
Nagorno-Karabakh and Armenian-occupied territories surrounding Nagorno-Karabakh	Azerbaijan; Armenia; Artsakh	1991	2024	Following the dissolution of the Soviet Union, internationally recognized as part of Azerbaijan but controlled by the Republic of Artsakh, which was de facto supported by Armenia until it was dissolved on January 1, 2024. Artsakh claimed a part of Goranboy District, which it lost during Operation Goranboy in 1993 during the First Nagorno-Karabakh War, as part of Shahumyan Province. Artsakh also claimed but did not control parts of Khojavend and Tartar districts as parts of Martuni and Martakert provinces, respectively. Azerbaijan captured the surrounding territories and the city of Shusha during the Second Nagorno-Karabakh War in 2020, then finally all of Nagorno-Karabakh proper during a 2023 offensive. The dispute ended after the dissolution of Artsakh
Hatay Province	**Turkey**; Syria	1939	2024	Annexed by Turkey in 1939, claimed by Syria until the fall of the Ba'athist regime in 2024, as implied by the current logos of the Syrian Ministry of Information and the General Security Service.
South Korea	North Korea; **South Korea**	1945	2026	The dispute began with the Division of Korea at the end of World War II. North Korea recognized the Republic of Korea and dropped its claim to the southern Korean peninsula in 2026. However, when announcing the recognition of South Korea, North Korean leader Kim Jong Un declared South Korea as North Korea's 'primary enemy state' (적대국) and vowed to reclaim it through "nuclear force" and to establish legal provisions for "occupying", "recapturing" and "incorporating" South Korean territory into North Korea in the event of a second Korean war.

=== Europe ===
Territory	Former claimants	Dispute started	Dispute settled	Notes
Cieszyn Silesia, Orava Territory, Spiš and areas around the cities of Kłodzko and Racibórz	Poland; Czechoslovakia	1918	1958	Border conflicts between Poland and Czechoslovakia began in 1918 over the disputed areas of Cieszyn Silesia, Orava Territory and Spiš. After World War II they broadened to include areas around the cities of Kłodzko and Racibórz, which until 1945 had belonged to Germany. On 13 June 1958, in Warsaw, the two countries signed a treaty confirming the border at the line of 1 January 1938 (that is, returning to the situation before the Nazi-imposed Munich Agreement transferred territory from Czechoslovakia to Poland)
Village of Aibga and surrounding area	**Republic of Abkhazia**; Russia; Georgia	2011	2011	During the existence of the Soviet Union, the village of Aibga was divided into two; the southern part belonged to Georgia and the northern part to Russia. In March 2011 Russia laid claim to the southern area of Aibga. After the Abkhaz side proved that the southern part of Aibga belonged to the Georgian SSR, the claim on the village was dropped by Russia.
Islets and rocks in the Minquiers and Ecrehos groups and the surrounding seas.	**United Kingdom**; France		1953	The United Kingdom and France requested the ICJ to determine the country that held sovereignty over the islets and rocks in the Minquiers and Ecrehos groups. France claimed sovereignty because it fished in the waters and it had historic sovereignty over the area from the 11th century's Duchy of Normandy. The United Kingdom claimed that Jersey had historically exercised legal and administrative jurisdiction over them. The ICJ decided on 17 November 1953 that sovereignty over the islands belonged to the United Kingdom.
Åland	**Finland**; Sweden	1917	1921	Sweden and Finland argued over the control of the Åland Islands (located between Sweden and Finland). The Åland movement (Ålandsrörelsen) wanted Åland to reunite with its old mother country Sweden (Finland and Åland belonged to Sweden before 1809). The movement gathered signatures from over 7000 inhabitants of legal age at the Åland Islands in 1917 (that was about 96% of the population) – they all supported a union with Sweden. When Finland became independent (6 December 1917) Sweden wanted a plebiscite about the future of the Åland Islands to solve the problem. Finland refused and argued that the Åland Islands had always been a natural part of Finland – even when Finland was under Swedish rule. Sweden appealed to the League of Nations referring to the right of the population to determine which country they should belong to. After studying the matter closely the League of Nations decided Finland should retain sovereignty over the province but that the Åland Islands should be made an autonomous territory. The Swedish Prime Minister said he didn't accept the verdict but he also said that Sweden was not going to use military force to get their claims.
Baltic Sea	**Poland**; Denmark	1978	2018	Poland has decided to cede to Denmark 80 percent of the disputed territory.
Bessarabia and Northern Bukovina	**Soviet Union**; Socialist Republic of Romania	1989	1989	On 13 November 1989, Nicolae Ceauşescu demanded the annulment of the Molotov–Ribbentrop pact, pursuant to which Bessarabia and Northern Bukovina were occupied by the Soviet Union, and the return of these territories to Romania. This demand was officially adopted as party policy by 14th Congress of the Communist Party of Romania, held later the same month. Ceauşescu was overthrown in the Romanian Revolution in December 1989 before the claim could be seriously pursued, and the post-revolutionary National Salvation Front abandoned it.
Bulgaria-Turkey riverine border	**Bulgaria**; **Turkey**	1990	1990	The border at the Rezovo's mouth was the subject of a minor territorial dispute between Bulgaria and Turkey, which was settled in the 1990s. As a result of an agreement between the two countries of 6 May 1992 (ratified by Bulgaria in 1998), Bulgaria received a small land area of several square kilometres in the Rezovo Bay in return for water area in the continental shelf.
Couto Misto	**Portugal**; **Spain**	1976	2008	As the three villages of the Couto Misto, an independent microstate which existed from the 10th century until 1868, are now separated in two different municipalities, the main reminder of the Couto Misto in the area are the common land community trusts that continue to function in each of the villages under the old system of popular assembly. All three commons trusts were established in 1976, and incorporate 654 hectares (6.54 km^{2}) for Rubiás, 452 hectares (4.52 km^{2}) for Santiago de Rubiás and 311 hectares (3.11 km^{2}) for Meaus. This common land represents most of the territory of the former Couto Misto. The trusts also maintain the claim of rights of common over the strip of land formerly part of the Couto Misto and now part of the Portuguese municipality of Montalegre. Political moves regarding the Couto Misto have led to debates and resolutions in the Galician, Spanish and European Parliaments. In May 2007, a motion (Proposición no de ley) was discussed and approved (with 303 votes in favour) by the Spanish Parliament recognizing the singularity of the Couto Mixto as a historical and cultural enclave, and calling for measures that allow for the social and economic development of the territory. At the same time, a similar motion was approved by the Galician Parliament, also recognizing the historical singularity of the Couto. In 2008, a written question was presented at the European Parliament regarding the European Union's contribution to the revival of the Couto Mixto, defined as an "institution which was politically and administratively independent of the Spanish and Portuguese crowns".
Graham Island	**Two Sicilies**; Malta; France; Spain	1831	1831	A dispute between the Kingdom of the Two Sicilies, the British Crown Colony of Malta, the Kingdom of France and the Kingdom of Spain occurred after the volcanic island appeared in 1831. The British were the first to claim the island as part of Malta, and they were followed by the Two Sicilies and France, while Spain expressed their ambitions to control the island. The island disappeared by December 1831 and the dispute stopped. A Sicilian flag was lowered over the now submerged island in 2000 to show Italian claims to the area. It is no longer disputed by Britain, France, Spain or Malta.
Lampedusa	**Kingdom of Sicily**; Malta	1800	1814	The island was controlled by British troops as a de facto part of the Malta Protectorate from 1800 onwards. After a British royal commission was sent there in 1812, the new Governor of Malta Sir Thomas Maitland withdrew British troops and the island was returned to Sicily.
Tenedos/Bozcaada	**Turkey**; Greece	1920	1923	On 11 August 1920, following World War I, the Treaty of Sèvres with the defeated Ottoman Empire granted the island to Greece, who joined the war in Allies' side in May 1917. The new Turkish Government of Mustafa Kemal Atatürk, based in Ankara, which was not party to the treaty, overthrew the Ottoman government, which signed but did not ratify the treaty. After the Turkish War of Independence ended in Greek defeat in Anatolia, and the fall of David Lloyd George and his Middle Eastern policies after the Carlton Club meeting, the western powers agreed to the Treaty of Lausanne with the new Turkish Republic, in 1923. This treaty made Tenedos/Bozcaada and Imbros part of Turkey, and it guaranteed a special autonomous administrative status there to accommodate the Greeks.
Island of Ireland	**United Kingdom**; Revolutionary Irish Republic	1919	1922	On 21 January 1919, the 69 Sinn Féin MPs elected in the 1918 United Kingdom general election in Ireland to the British House of Commons refused to take their seats in the British Parliament and instead assembled in a separate parliament in Ireland, which proclaimed Irish independence under a revolutionary Irish Republic, leading to the Irish War of Independence. In 1920, following the collapse of the British administration, the revolutionary republic established control over 21 of Ireland's 32 counties, with only urban areas and what would later become Northern Ireland remaining under British control; however, by the Anglo-Irish treaty of 1921, which ended the war of independence, the revolutionary republic was replaced by the Irish Free State—a semi-independent Dominion of the British Empire albeit separate from the United Kingdom itself—on 6 December 1922. A day later, Northern Ireland opted out of inclusion in the Irish Free State and returned to the UK, thus de facto effecting the partition of Ireland into two regions, established de jure by the British Parliament's Government of Ireland Act 1920 on 23 December 1920. On 1 July 1937, the Irish Free State adopted a new constitution, by which it declared itself a fully independent state simply called "Ireland"; this Constitution also declared a claim to Northern Ireland until 1998.
Northern Ireland	**United Kingdom**; Ireland	1937	1998	Formerly disputed between Ireland and the United Kingdom since the Adoption of the Constitution of Ireland on 29 December 1937, it was settled by the Good Friday Agreement in 1998, when Ireland amended its constitution to withdraw its constitutional claim. Both countries acknowledged that the territory can join the rest of Ireland if separate referendums in both Northern Ireland and the Republic of Ireland approve of the former's cession.
Pytalovo (Abrene in Latvia)	**Russia**; Latvia	1991	2007	Pytalovo was a village in the parish of Vyshgorogok, the westernmost part of the Ostrov uyezd, Governorate of Pskov that was ceded from RSFSR to Latvia under the Treaty of Riga (1920) along with parishes of Kachanovo and Tonkovo. In 1940 Latvian Republic was annexed by the Soviet Union and Latvian SSR was established, encompassing the above named territories until 1944 when they were transferred to the district of Ostrov, Pskov Oblast, RSFSR. Since 1991 reestablished Republic of Latvia disputed Russian jurisdiction over the region until the border treaty with Russia was signed in 2007.
Black Sea and Snake Island	**Ukraine**; Romania	2004	2009	In 2004 Romania filed a case to International Court of Justice claiming that Ukraine's Snake Island was an uninhabitable rock under UNCLOS standards and thus not eligible to carry influence over determination of the maritime boundary between the two states. During the Soviet times the island was a small naval station with a lighthouse. In 2007 the Ukrainian parliament approved an establishment of a small settlement there, Bile, as part of the Odesa Oblast. The maritime boundary issue was settled by the International Court of Justice in 2009, awarding Romania 80% of the disputed area.
Vilnius Region	**Lithuania**; Poland	1920	1945	During the Polish–Soviet War Polish armies entered the Vilnius Region which was at the time part of the Soviet Lithuanian–Belorussian Soviet Socialist Republic. In 1920, Polish General Lucjan Żeligowski led a coup and established the Republic of Central Lithuania which was annexed to the Second Polish Republic after the war as part of the historic Polish–Lithuanian Commonwealth and due to ethnic Poles in the region. Lithuania moved its capital to Kaunas while never giving up its claim to Vilnius. The Lithuanians found support in the Soviet Union for their cause signing the Soviet–Lithuanian Mutual Assistance Treaty in 1939. Following the Soviet invasion of Poland, the region came under Soviet control and became part of the Lithuanian SSR after World War II which was followed by a large number of ethnic Poles being deported two times. Following the fall of the Soviet Union and Act of the Re-Establishment of the State of Lithuania the Vilnius region became part of Lithuania again.
Passetto di Borgo in the vicinity of the Vatican City	**Italy**; Holy See	1870	1991	Pope John Paul II recognized the sovereignty of Italy over the Passetto on 18 May 1991.
Jan Mayen	**Norway**; Iceland	1979	1980	Norway and Iceland argued over sovereignty of Jan Mayen from the period of 1979 to 1980. The island had been annexed by Norway in 1926, and was home of a Norwegian meteorological station. During a delegation to Iceland in April 1980, Icelandic foreign minister Ólafur Jóhannesson cited statements from the late 1920s to point out how Iceland never officially recognised Norway's annexation of the island. He also indicated that, historically, the island had much closer ties to Iceland than it did to Norway. The Icelandic government never intended to seriously dispute the sovereignty of the island, but used these points to gain a bargaining position over the waters surrounding the island. On 28 May 1980, Iceland and Norway signed a treaty which gave Iceland most of what it wanted, including a recognition of the 200 nautical mile Exclusive economic zone around Iceland.
Norway–Russia border maritime border	Norway; Russia		2011	For decades there was a boundary dispute between Norway and Russia regarding the position of the boundary between their respective claims to the Barents Sea. The Norwegians favoured a median line, based on the Geneva Convention of 1958, whereas the Russians favoured a meridian- based sector line, based on a Soviet decision of 1926. In 2010, Norway and Russia signed an agreement that placed the boundary equidistant from their competing claims. This was ratified and went into force on 7 July 2011.
Erik the Red's Land	Norway; Denmark		1933	Erik the Red's Land was the name given by Norwegians to an area on the coast of eastern Greenland occupied by Norway in the early 1930s. The Permanent Court of International Justice ruled against Norway in the Eastern Greenland Case in 1933, and the country subsequently abandoned its claims.
Mažeikiai, Palanga and Šventoji	Latvia; Lithuania	1919	1921	In 1919, after the breakup of the Russian Empire, Mažeikiai, Palanga and Šventoji became a part of Latvia. After unsuccessful negotiations it was decided to invoke an international arbitration. In 1921, the town was peacefully transferred to Lithuania following a Lithuanian-Latvian treaty.

=== Oceania ===
Territory	Former claimants	Dispute started	Dispute settled	Notes
Islands of Funafuti, Niulakita, Nukufetau and Nukulaelae	British Empire (-1978); United States; **Tuvalu (1978–1983)**		1983	Claimed by the United States under the Guano Islands Act until the Treaty of Friendship was signed in 1979 which was ratified by the U.S. Senate in 1983.
Several islands, reefs and atolls	British Empire (-1979); United States; **Kiribati (1979–1983)**		1983	Claimed by the United States under the Guano Islands Act until the Treaty of Tarawa was signed in 1979 which was ratified by the U.S. Senate in 1983.
Islands of Nukunonu and Atafu	British Empire (1889–1925); New Zealand; United States; **Tokelau**	1860	1983	Claimed by the United States under the Guano Islands Act until the Treaty of Tokehega was signed in 1980 which was ratified by the U.S. Senate in 1983. Britain claimed in 1899 and transferred to New Zealand's administration in 1925.
Manihiki, Penrhyn Island, Pukapuka and Rakahanga.	British Empire; United States; **Cook Islands**		1983	Claimed by the United States under the Guano Islands Act until the Cook Islands–United States Maritime Boundary Treaty was signed in 1980 which was ratified by the U.S. Senate in 1983.
Beveridge Island and Pental Island	**Victoria**; New South Wales	1871	1873	
South Australia–Victoria border	**Victoria**; South Australia		1914	
Timor Gap	Australia; Portugal (1970s–2002); Indonesia (1975–1999); UNTAET (1999–2002); Timor-Leste (2002–2018)	1970s	2019	Timor-Leste and Australia reached agreement on a treaty delimiting a permanent maritime boundary in March 2018; both countries ratified the treaty in August 2019.

== See also ==
- Demilitarized zone
- Dependent territory
- Frozen conflict
- List of administrative divisions by country
- List of areas disputed by Canada and the United States
- List of border conflicts
- List of countries and territories by land and maritime borders
- List of internal boundary disputes in the Philippines
- List of sovereign states
- Lists of active separatist movements
- Neutral territory
- Territorial claims in the Arctic
- Territorial disputes in the Persian Gulf
