= Susta Rural Municipality =

Rural municipality in Lumbini Province, Nepal

Susta सुस्ता
- Rural municipality
- Location in Nepal Susta (Nepal)
- Coordinates: 27.45°N 83.86°E
- Country: Nepal
- Province: Lumbini Province
- District: Parasi
- No. of wards: 5
- Established: 10 March 2017

Government
  - Type: Rural council
  - Chairperson: Mr. Tek Narayan Uppadhaya
  - Vice-chairperson: Mrs. Geeta Chaudhary

Area
  - Total: 91.24 km^{2} (35.23 sq mi)

Population (2011)
  - Total: 35,890
  - Density: 393.4/km^{2} (1,019/sq mi)
- Time zone: UTC+5:45 (NST)
- Headquarters: Kudiya
- Website: sustamun.gov.np

Susta (Nepali: सुस्ता) is a rural municipality located in Parasi District of Lumbini Province of Nepal.

The total area of the rural municipality is 91.24 square kilometres (35.23 sq mi) and the total population at the 2011 Nepal census was 35,890 individuals. The rural municipality is divided into 5 wards.

The rural municipality was established on 10 March 2017, fulfilling the requirement of the new constitution of Nepal in 2015, all old municipalities and villages (which were more than 3900 in number) were restructured into 753 new units, thus this RM came into existence.

Kudiya, a portion of Tribenisusta, a big portion of Rupauliya, Narsahi and Pakalihawa Village development committees were incorporated to form this new rural municipality. The headquarters of the municipality is situated at Kudiya.

== Background ==
The rural municipality was established on 10 March 2017 as named Tribenisusta and it was part of Gandaki Province under Nawalpur District. the area of this municipality was 112.17 square kilometres (43.31 mi^{2}) and it had population of 43,797 individuals. Soon, the decision was taken to keep it in Lumbini Province under Parasi District but a big portion of Tribenisusta excluded from it and merged to Binayi Tribeni rural municipality of Gandaki Province.
