= Mechipari territory =

Mechipari territory मेचीपारि
- Land across the Mechi River
- Location in Nepal Mechipari territory (Koshi Province)
- Coordinates: 26.5464°N 88.1064°E
- Country: Nepal
- Province: Koshi Province
- Municipalities: Bhadrapur, Mechinagar

Government
  - Type: Ward area
  - Body: Ward No. 1, 3, 15

Mechipari is a territory that lies in the eastern part of Mechi River in Jhapa District in Koshi Province of Nepal. Mechipari is an eastern area of ward No. 1, 3 and 5 of Bhadrapur Municipality and ward no. 15 of Mechinagar Municipality. Literally the meaning of Mechipari in English is "Across the Mechi river". Mechipari is located in the eastern part of the Mechi river bordering India.

Mechipari
Mechipari

The Mechi River is the international border between Nepal and India which was fixed in 1816 by signing the Treaty of Sugauli between Kingdom of Nepal and British East India Company during Company rule in India. But although the river is the official boundary line, much of the land east of the river belongs to Nepal due to changes in the course of the river. Between 1818 and 1873, the Mechi River changed course, resulting in some parts of Nepal moving across the river.

== Dolobasti ==
Dolobasti (Bhangbari) is the village located in Mechipari ward no. 3. There are 300 families in Dolobasti

== See also ==
- Kalapani territory (disputed)
- Susta territory (disputed)
