= Ukatny Island =

Ukatnyy Остров Укатный Ukatny
- Disputed island
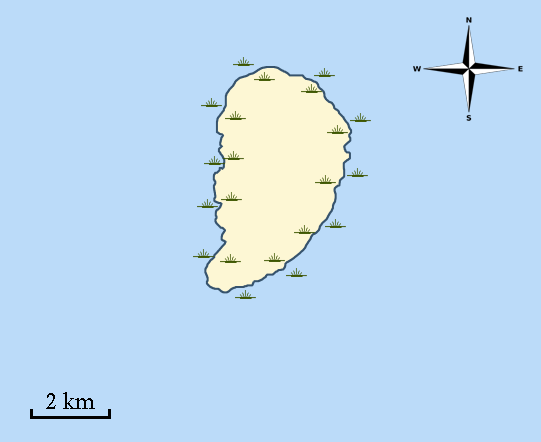
- Map of Ukatnyy Island

- Location within Caspian Sea
- Coordinates: 45°55′28″N 49°34′40″E
- Sea: Caspian Sea
- Territory status: Disputed island
- Countries: Russian Federation / Kazakhstan

Area
  - Total: 14.9 km^{2} (5.8 sq mi)

Ukatnyy or Ukatny is an island in the northern Caspian Sea. It is located off the eastern end of the mouths of the Volga.

Ukatnyy Island is marshy. It has a length of 6.2 km and a maximum width of 4.3 km. It lies in an offshore oil producing area.

Ukatnyy is a disputed island. According to Russia administratively this island belongs to the Astrakhan Oblast of the Russian Federation, but Kazakhstan had assumed the island was part of its historical territory and includes it in its Atyrau Region. Other disputed islands near Ukatny are the following:

- Zhestky (Ostrov Zhestky) 45°54′N 49°24′E. Located about 8 km to the WSW of Ukatny's southern tip.
- Maly Zhemchuzhny 45°02′55.9″N 48°18′36.36″E. More a sandbank than a proper island.

== See also ==
- List of territorial disputes
