= Susta territory =

Susta सुस्ता
- Disputed territory
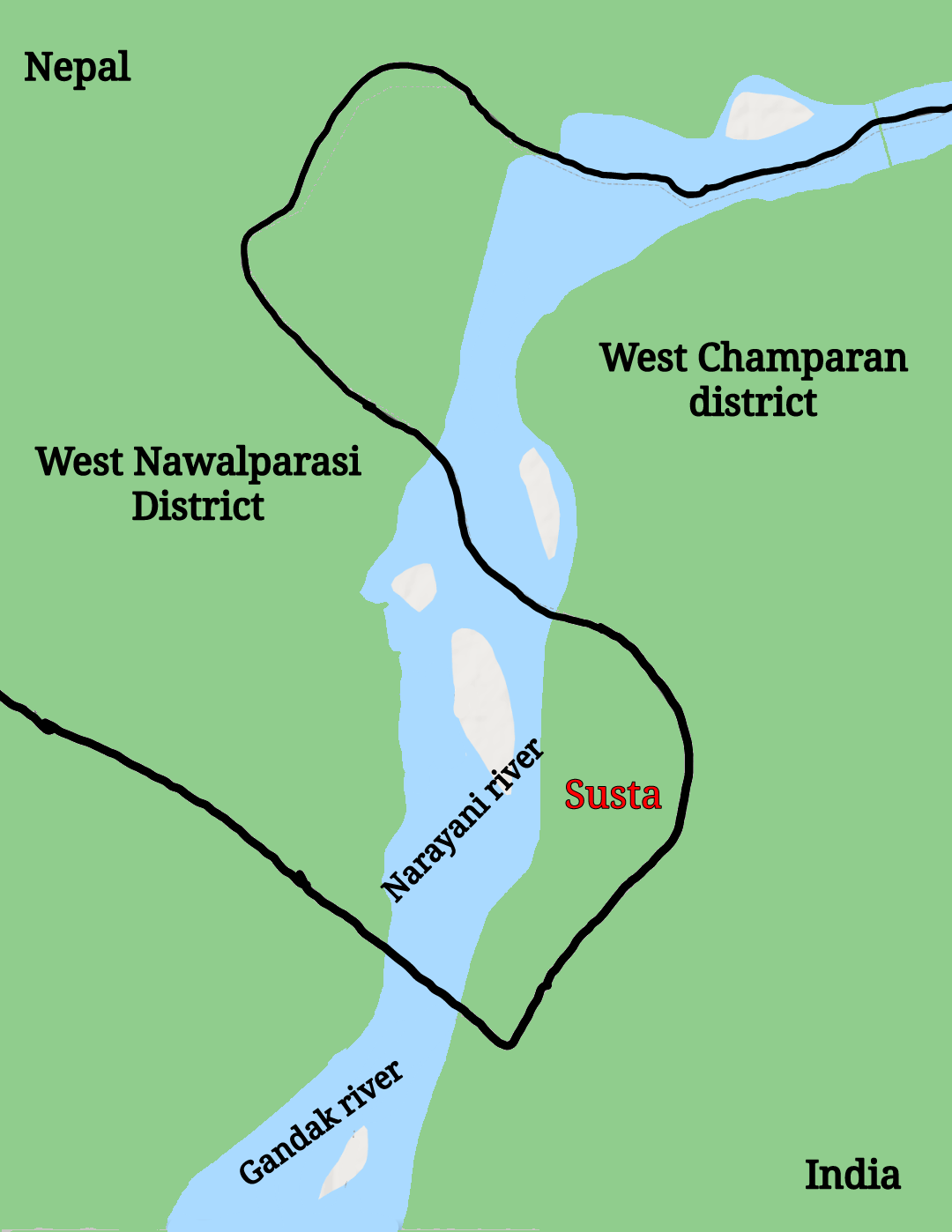
- Disputed Susta

- Location within Lumbini Province Location within Nepal Location within Bihar Location within India
- Coordinates: 27.3572647°N 83.87609°E
- Status: Administered by Nepal; Claimed by India
- Established: Rana regime
- Founder: Rana

Government
  - Type: Ward commissioner
  - Body: Ward No. 5

Area
  - Total: 50 km^{2} (19 sq mi)
- Time zone: UTC+5:45

Susta is a disputed territory between Nepal and India. It is administered by Nepal as part of Susta Rural Municipality, under West Nawalparasi District in Lumbini Province. It is claimed by India as part of West Champaran district of Bihar. The disputed territory is located on the eastern side of the Gandak river (Narayani River in Nepal). Nepal claims the area a part of West Nawalparasi District under Susta rural municipality (part of ward no. 5), alleging that over 14,860 hectares of Nepali land in Susta has been encroached upon by India while India claims Susta to be a part of West Champaran district.

According to the Sugauli Treaty signed between the British East India Company and Nepal in 1816, the Gandak river is the international boundary and eastern part of the river belongs to India and western part of the river belongs to Nepal. At the time the treaty was signed Susta village was situated west of the river. But, over the years, the Gandak river changed its course and Susta moved to the east side of the river, that is now on the Indian side of the river.

Nepal maintains the Gandak's course in 1816 to be taken as the fixed international boundary but India claims that land on the eastern side of the river is its own territory.

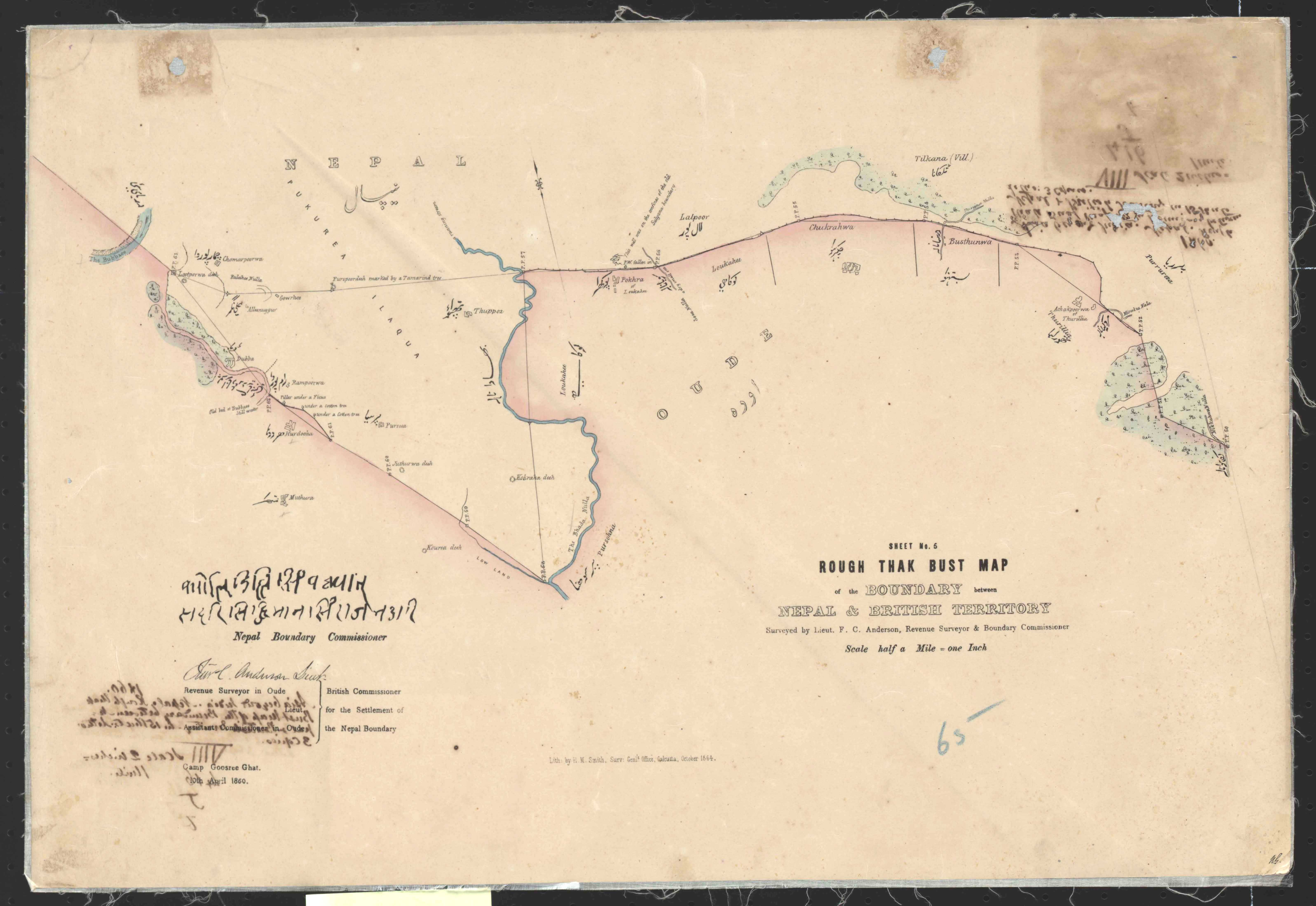
Map of boundary between Nepal and British territory Oudh in 1860.

== See also ==
- India-Nepal disputed territories
- Kalapani territory
- Mechipari territory
