= Isla Suárez =

Island disputed by Bolivia and Brazil

Ilha de Guajará-Mirim Isla Suárez
Disputed island
- Location within Bolivia Location within Brazil

Geography
- Coordinates: 10°47′42″S 65°21′35″W

Claimed by
- Bolivia
- Department: Beni
- Municipality: Guayaramerín
- Brazil
- State: Rondônia

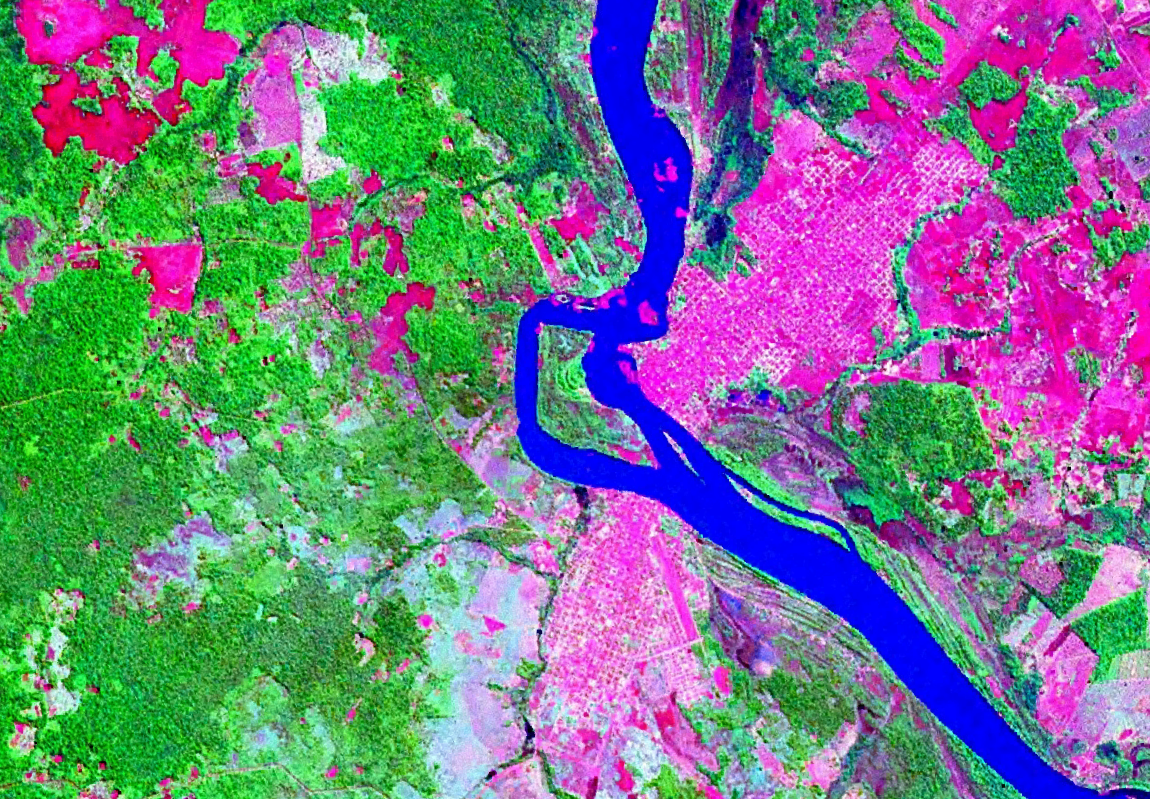

The Ilha de Guajará-Mirim (Brazil) or Isla Suárez (Bolivia) is one of the world's many disputed territories. The island lies in the Rio Mamoré in Amazon, which defines part of the boundary between the Bolivian department of Beni and the Brazilian state of Rondônia in the Amazon. The island's sovereignty is the object of passive contention between the governments of Brazil and Bolivia, which administer it de jure.

== History ==
The area was demarcated by the Treaty of Ayacucho, on March 27, 1867, which, in its article 2, declares:

(...) [The border between Brazil and Bolivia] will go down [through the Verde River] to its confluence with the Guaporé and through this and the Mamoré until Beni, where the Madeira River begins.(...)

The border in this area was demarcated in 1877, and the Bolivian company Irmãos Suarez was established there in 1896. The Treaty of Petrópolis, on November 17, 1903, confirmed the same limit established in 1867. On April 1, 1930, the Brazilian legation in La Paz complained about what it considered to be an inadequate occupation of the island. In 1937, the government of Bolivia issued a report showing the island's greater proximity to the Bolivian side, which was rejected by Brazil. In 1955, Brazil intended to establish a police post on the island, but did not carry out the project. On March 29, 1958, an agreement was signed between the two countries called the Roboré Agreement, in which, in addition to resolving other disputed issues, it was agreed, in the future, to resolve the dispute over the sovereignty of Suárez Island. This convention was ratified by the Brazilian Congress on November 30, 1968. In its article 4, it establishes that:

The Government of Brazil agreed with the Government of Bolivia to re-examine the issue of the legal status of the island of Guajará Mirim (Isla Suárez).

In 2009, the island continues without a definitive solution regarding its territorial possession, and it remains supposedly under Bolivian administration, despite the fact that the island is a place of economic activity for the Brazilian inhabitants of Guajará-Mirim, who hold most of the island's territory. More than 80 islands in the Guaporé and Mamoré rivers have yet to be assigned to one country or another.
