= Rupauliya =

Village development committee in Lumbini Zone, Nepal

Rupauliya रुपौलिया
- Village development committee
- Location in Nepal
- Coordinates: 27.48°N 83.86°E
- Country: Nepal
- Zone: Lumbini Zone
- District: Nawalparasi District

Population (1991)
  - Total: 6,331
- Time zone: UTC+5:45 (Nepal Time)

As of 3 April 2018, Rupauliya is now a ward (Ward No 1) within Susta Rural Municipality. Before that, it was a village development committee in Nawalparasi District in the Lumbini Zone of southern Nepal. At the time of the 1991 Nepal census, it had a population of 6,331 people living in 1,128 individual households.
