= Vila Thomaz Albornoz =

Contested village between Brazil and Uruguay

Vila Thomaz Albornoz is a village in the border region between Brazil and Uruguay claimed by both countries, litigated intermittently since 1934. It is north of Villa Masoller in Uruguay and on international maps it appears as a territory under discussion. The contested land Rincão de Artigas is 22,000 hectares (85 sq mi). Vila Albornoz was installed in 1985, on land ceded by rancher Thomaz Albornoz, to mark Brazilian presence.

== See also ==
Rincão de Artigas
