= Tribenisusta =

Tribenisusta त्रिवेणी सुस्ता
- Village development committee
- Location in Nepal
- Coordinates: 27°27′N 83°54′E
- Country: Nepal
- Zone: Lumbini Zone
- District: Nawalparasi District

Population (1991)
  - Total: 7,830
- Time zone: UTC+5:45 (Nepal Time)

Tribenisusta is a village development committee in Nawalparasi District in the Lumbini Zone of southern Nepal. At the time of the 1991 Nepal census it had a population of 7830 people living in 1477 individual households.
