= Ungar-Too =

Mountain on the Kyrgyz-Uzbek border

- Ungar-Tepe
- Location within Uzbekistan Location within Kyrgyzstan

Highest point
- Elevation: 1,956 m (6,417 ft)
- Coordinates: 41°26′9″N 71°43′49″E

Geography
- Location: Jalal-Abad Region, Kyrgyzstan; Namangan Region; Uzbekistan

The Ungar-Too (also: Ungar-Tepe) is a mountain located on the Kyrgyzstan–Uzbekistan border, which has been a cause of tension between the two countries.

== Development ==
There is an important relay station on the mountain, which is of great importance for Kyrgyz telecommunications service providers. Overall, development of the Ungar-Too mountain is limited to six antenna masts and a few smaller buildings.

== Border dispute ==
As a result of the Soviet demarcation in Central Asia, which hardly corresponds to ethnic and cultural borders, there are border disputes in many places in the region. These keep causing tension between Uzbekistan and Kyrgyzstan, most recently in 2016 when a conflict sparked, among other things, over the question of who the Ungar-Too belonged to.

On 22 August 2016, seven Uzbek security forces landed on the mountain in a helicopter after tensions had developed between the two neighbors due to another territorial issue at the Ortotokoi Dam. During the Uzbek operation, four Kyrgyz workers who were working at the relay station were provisionally arrested. They were charged with staying illegally on Uzbek territory. The Kyrgyz authorities demanded the immediate release of the prisoners and the evacuation of the mountain. Uzbekistan, on the other hand, insisted that the mountain belonged to Uzbek territory, which is also evident from a 2006 agreement made during the tenure of former Kyrgyz President Kurmanbek Bakiyev. The then Kyrgyz President Almazbek Atambayev pointed out that the agreements were concluded under non-transparent conditions and without the approval of parliament.

The Uzbek presence on the mountain remained for the time being and was increased to 20 people at the beginning of September 2016. The occupation of the Ungar-Too was also used as leverage in other acute issues, but bilateral negotiations initially remained unsuccessful. The four Kyrgyz workers were held in a police station in Yangikurgan. The diplomatic efforts eventually led to the release of the prisoners and the evacuation of the mountain on 18 September.

In the months to come, the two countries came closer together and a Kyrgyz diplomatic delegation visited Uzbekistan for the first time in several years. In July 2018, an agreement was concluded between the states that clarified some border issues, but the Ungar-Too was not mentioned in it, so that status remains unclear.
