= Guinea–Liberia border =

International border

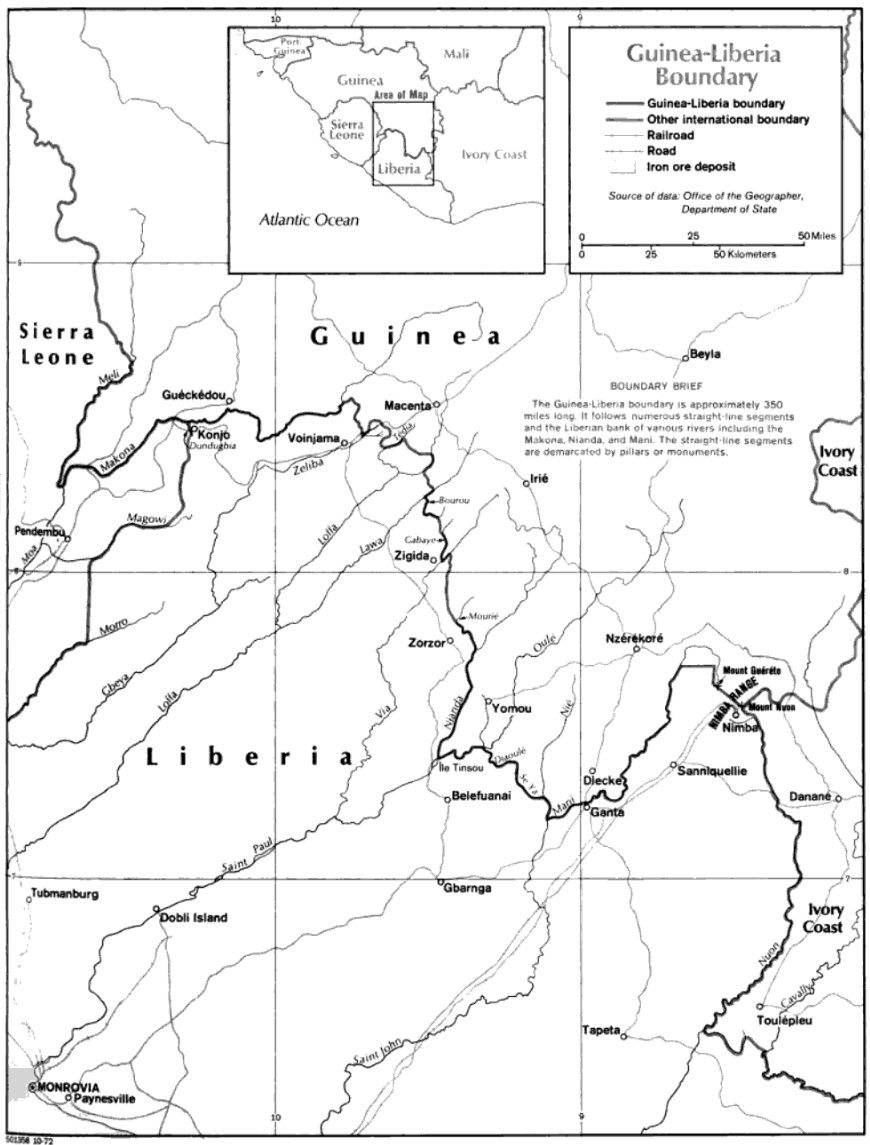
Map of the Guinea-Liberia border

The Guinea–Liberia border is 590 km (367 mi) in length and runs from the tripoint with Sierra Leone in the west to the tripoint with the Ivory Coast in the east.

== Description ==
The boundary starts in the west at the tripoint with Sierra Leone on the Makona river, following this river eastwards before running overland to the southeast via a series of very irregular lines. Upon reaching the Diani/Nianda it then follows this river southwards, before turning eastwards. It then proceeds in this direction via a series of overland and riverine (such as the Djoule and Mani) sections, turning to the northeast and then finally southeast to the Ivorian tripoint on Mount Nuon in the Nimba Range.

== History ==
Liberia was founded as a colony for freed American slaves in 1822; various settlements were founded along the coast in the following years, with the bulk of them uniting to create the Republic of Liberia in 1847 (the Republic of Maryland joined later in 1857). France had also taken an interest in the West African coast, settling in the region of modern Senegal in the 17th century and later annexing the coast of what is now Guinea in the late 19th century as the Rivières du Sud colony. The area was renamed French Guinea 1893, and was later included within the French West Africa colony.

As the African interior began to be carved up during the Scramble for Africa in the 1880s, France and Liberia signed a boundary treaty on 8 December 1892 outlining their respective territorial limits (for France, this treaty covered what would later become the Ivory Coast as well as Guinea). This treated, for Liberia, utilised straight lines and was further north than the current line. The difficulties with demarcating this boundary on the ground led France and Liberia to conclude another treaty on 18 September 1907, confirmed in January 1911, which moved it south to its current position. Meanwhile, an Anglo-Liberian treaty concluded at the same time shifted Sierra Leone's territory eastward slightly, thereby also shifting the Guinea tripoint. The Guinea–Liberia border was later demarcated on the ground from 1926 to 1929.

French Guinea gained independence in 1958, and the boundary then became one between two sovereign states. Both states confirmed that they recognised and respected the existing boundary in 1960. The boundary region became unstable in the 1990s-early 2000s due to the Liberian Civil Wars.

== Settlements near the border ==
=== Guinea ===
- Guéckédou
- Boboueloua

=== Liberia ===
- Voinjama
- Gbangoi
- Golu
- Gbalatuai
- Shankpalai
- Gahnoa
- Ganta
- Yekepa
