= Kudiya =

Kudiya कुडिया
- Village development committee
- Location in Nepal
- Coordinates: 27.45°N 83.86°E
- Country: Nepal
- Zone: Lumbini Zone
- District: Nawalparasi District

Population (1991)
  - Total: 7,564
- Time zone: UTC+5:45 (Nepal Time)

Kudiya is a village development committee in Nawalparasi District in the Lumbini Zone of southern Nepal. At the time of the 1991 Nepal census it had a population of 7564 people living in 1252 individual households.
