= Legislative districts of Parañaque =

Legislative district of the Philippines

The legislative districts of Parañaque are the representations of the highly urbanized city of Parañaque in the Congress of the Philippines. The city is currently represented in the lower house of the Congress through its first and second congressional districts.

== History ==
Parañaque was initially represented as part of the at-large district of the province of Manila in the Malolos Congress from 1898 to 1899. The then-town was later incorporated to the province of Rizal, established in 1901, and was represented as part of the first district of Rizal from 1907 to 1941 and from 1945 to 1972. It was incorporated to the City of Greater Manila and was represented as part of the at-large district of Manila from 1943 to 1944. Parañaque was separated from Rizal on November 7, 1975 by virtue of Presidential Decree No. 824, and was represented in the Interim Batasang Pambansa along with other Metropolitan Manila municipalities and cities as part of Region IV from 1978 to 1984.

Parañaque was grouped with Las Piñas in the Regular Batasang Pambansa from 1984 to 1986, as the Legislative district of Las Piñas–Parañaque. It was granted its own representation in the restored House of Representatives in 1987, and was divided into two districts after its city charter (Republic Act No. 8507) was amended by Republic Act No. 9229, approved on December 17, 2003.

== Current districts and representatives ==
The city was last redistricted in 2004, wherein the city gained a second seat in the House of Representatives.

Political parties

Lakas–CMD (1)
NUP (1)

Legislative districts and congressional representatives of Parañaque
District	Current representative	Barangays	Population (2020)
1st	Eric L. Olivarez (since 2025); San Dionisio	List: Baclaran; Don Galo; La Huerta; San Dionisio; San Isidro; Santo Niño; Tambo; Vitalez	265,839
2nd	Brian Raymund S. Yamsuan (since 2025); B.F. Homes	List: B.F. Homes; Don Bosco; Marcelo Green; Merville; Moonwalk; San Antonio; San Martin de Porres; Sun Valley	424,153

== Historical districts ==
Period	Representative	Constituents
8th Congress; 1987–1992	Freddie N. Webb	Parañaque
9th Congress; 1992–1995	Jose Roilo S. Golez	Parañaque
10th Congress; 1995–1998	Jose Roilo S. Golez	Parañaque
11th Congress; 1998–2001	Jose Roilo S. Golez	Parañaque
12th Congress; 2001–2004	Eduardo C. Zialcita	Parañaque
