= List of city and municipal halls in Metro Manila =

The following is a list of the city and town (municipal) halls in Metro Manila.

== Current ==
City or town	Building	Image	Locale	Built	Notes
Caloocan	Caloocan City Hall		Grace Park East	2017	Main city hall of Caloocan
Las Piñas	Las Piñas City Hall		Pamplona Tres	—	
Makati	Makati City Hall		Poblacion	2000	New city hall, coexists with the old city hall.
Malabon	Malabon City Hall		San Agustin	—	
Mandaluyong	Mandaluyong City Hall		Plainview	—	
Manila	Manila City Hall		Ermita	1941	
Marikina	Marikina City Hall		Santa Elena	1969	Eastern façade built during late-1990s.
Muntinlupa	Muntinlupa City Hall		Putatan	2007	Designed by Architect Roderick Espina in bahay kubo style, and built to replace a previous city hall that was destroyed in a fire in 2007.
Navotas	Navotas City Hall		Sipac-Almacen	—	
Parañaque	Parañaque City Hall		San Antonio	—	
Pasay	Pasay City Hall		Brgy. 70, Zone 9	—	
Pasig	Pasig Temporary City Hall		Rosario	2024	
Pateros	Pateros Municipal Hall		Aguho	—	
Quezon City	Quezon City Hall		Central	1972	
San Juan	San Juan City Hall		Pinaglabanan		
Taguig	Taguig City Hall		Tuktukan	1959	Current building is the third iteration built on the same site
Valenzuela	Valenzuela City Hall		Karuhatan	2009	New city hall, also known as the Legislative and People’s Center Building

== Former ==
City or town	Building	Image	Locale	Built	Notes
Caloocan	Caloocan City Hall		Poblacion	1952	Aging building was succeeded by the current city hall in Grace Park East that opened in 2017 and was replaced on its former site by 999 Shopping Mall Caloocan.
Caloocan	Caloocan City Hall North		Camarin	—	Old building at Caloocan's North portion replaced by a new building that began construction in 2023.
Makati	Makati City Hall		Poblacion	1962	New city hall built behind the structure.
Makati	Presidencia		Poblacion	1918	Now occupied by the Museo ng Makati
Manila	Ayuntamiento de Manila		Intramuros	1884	City hall moved to a new building. Destroyed during World War II and reconstructed in 2013.
Parañaque	Presidencia		La Huerta	1890	Old municipal hall that was replaced by the current city hall in 1971. Currently site of Ospital ng Parañaque.
Pasig	Pasig City Hall		San Nicolas	1967	Closed in 2025 for redevelopment as the new Pasig City Hall.
Quezon City	Quezon City Hall (I)		–	E. Rodriguez	Site is now Activa.
Quezon City	Quezon City Hall (II)		1950s	Immaculate Conception	Site is now Ramon Magsaysay (Cubao) High School.
Taguig	Presidencia		Sta. Ana	1892	Site is now currently occupied by Plaza Quezon
Taguig	Municipal Hall		Sta. Ana	1928	Built near the 1892 site. Current site is now a public market, while the municipal/city hall moved to its current Tuktukan location in 1959.
Valenzuela	Valenzuela City Hall			1982	Old city hall that was replaced by a new city hall in 2014

== Proposed / Under construction ==
City or town	Building	Locale	Status	Notes
Caloocan	Caloocan City Hall North	Camarin	Under construction	4-storey building under construction as of 2023.
Pasig	New Pasig City Hall	San Nicolas	Under construction	Reconstructed structure at the 1967 site.
Taguig	Taguig City Hall	Brgy. Ususan	Under construction	17-storey building under construction as of 2019. Taguig Convention Center, a part of the structure on the ground floor, is already operational, as well as the new Council Session Hall (home of the Taguig City Council), SP Session Hall Gallery, and function rooms inside the building.
