= Sun Valley, Parañaque =

Barangay in Parañaque, Philippines

Sun Valley
- Barangay
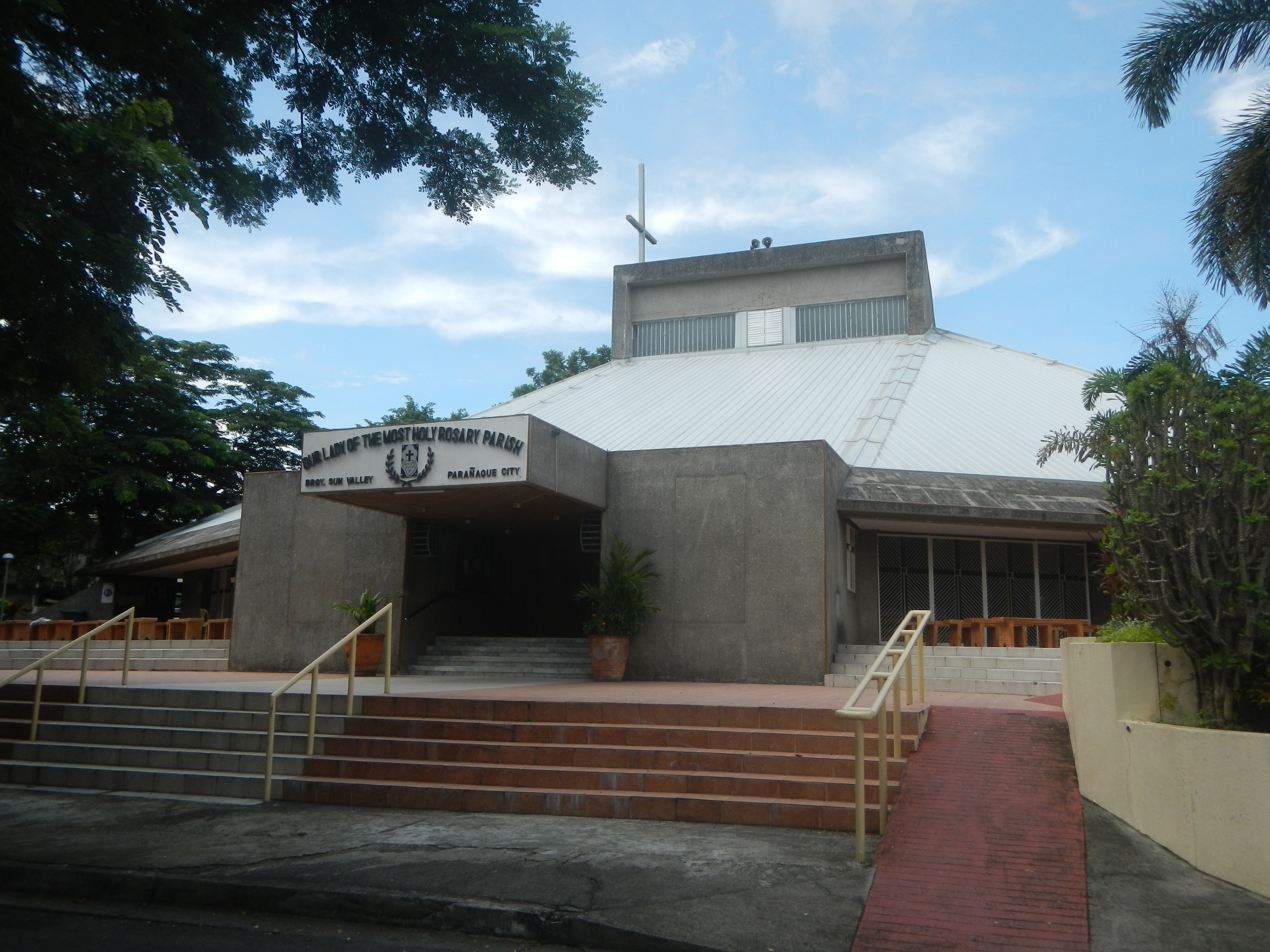
- Our Lady of the Most Holy Rosary Parish Church

- Location within Metro Manila
- Coordinates: 14°29′20″N 121°01′57″E
- Country: Philippines
- Region: National Capital Region
- City: Parañaque
- District: 2nd District of Parañaque City
- Established: April 3, 1978

Government
  - Type: Barangay
  - Barangay Captain: Christopher Marius Cortez

Area
  - Total: 177.75 ha (439.2 acres)

Population (2020)
  - Total: 50,087
  - Density: 21,145.4/km^{2} (54,766.4/sq mi)
- Time zone: UTC+8 (PST)
- Area code: 2

Sun Valley is a barangay of Parañaque, Metro Manila, Philippines.

== Geography ==
Sun Valley is bordered by the barangays of Mervillle to the north, Don Bosco to the south, and San Martín de Porres to the east. The South Luzon Expressway and West Service Road mark Sun Valley's eastern boundary. It is part of the 2nd legislative district of Parañaque.

== History ==
Formerly part of Barangay La Huerta that included Sun Valley, Marimar, Monte Villa de Monsod, Santa Ana, and Continental Village Subdivision, Sun Valley was made an independent barangay by President Ferdinand Marcos through Presidential Decree No. 1326 dated April 3, 1978.

== Demographics ==
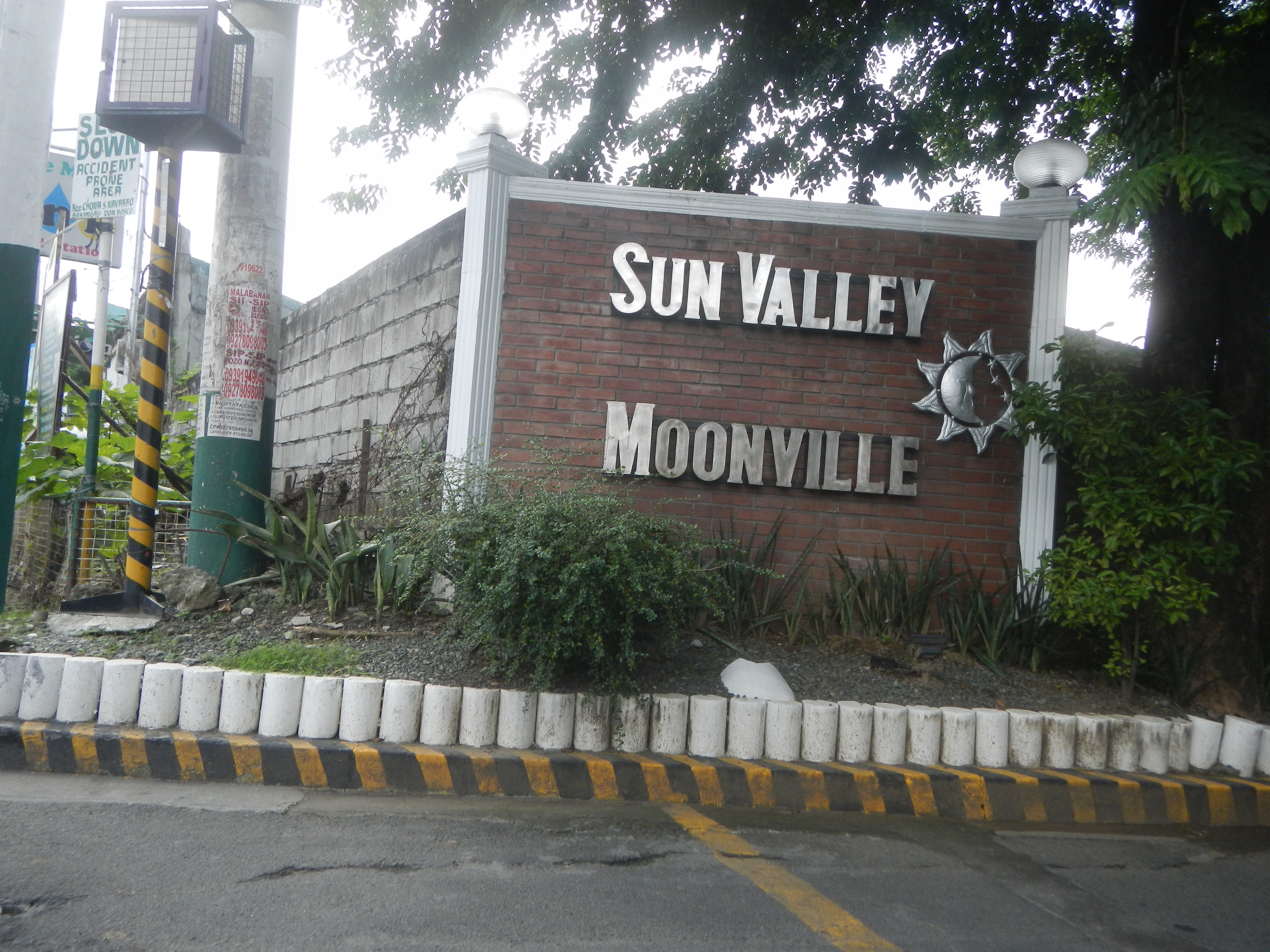
Moonville Subdivision

Year	Population
2007	35,448
2010	37,586
2015	48,913
2020	50,087
2024	39,136

Sun Valley is considered to be the third densest of 16 barangays in Parañaque, Philippines, with a land area of 177.75 hectares (439.2 acres) and an estimated population of 50,087 as of 2020, Sun Valley has a population density of 21,145.43 inhabitants per square kilometer (54,766.4/sq mi).

Barangay Sun Valley is made up of 16 subdivisions and 17 neighborhoods with an uneven spread of households across them. The estimated number of households in 2013 was just under 8,000.

The 16 subdivisions in order of number of households are:

Name of Subdivision	Estimated number of households
Villa Paraiso	1,089
Cul de Sac	1,000
Sun Valley Subdivision	900
Parkview Homes Subdivision	700
Camachile	400
Bukid Area	320
Lower Sta. Ana Zone	315
Riverside	280
Annex 41	250
Countryside Villa Phases 1 – 5	250
Executive Heights	250
Marimar Village 1 & 2	230
Sta. Ana Village	230
Purok Cherry East	230
Lower Sta. Ana Zone	210
Moonville Subdivision	160
Sun Valley Drive	160
Annex 45	136
Sitio Bagang Pag-Asa	110
Montevilla	90
Ramos Compound	70
Lower Sta. Ana Zone	65
Daffodil	60
St. Louis Compound	60
Purok Manggahan	60
Brotherhood Compound	60
Lower Sta. Ana Zone	60
Purok Katorse	55
Sapang Maligaya	40
Aster Family H. A.	36
Lower Sta. Ana Zone	35
Road 32	32
Lower Sta. Ana Zone	20
Total	7963
