= Parañaque's 2nd congressional district =

Legislative district of the Philippines

- Constituency for the House of Representatives of the Philippines
- Map
- Location of Parañaque within Metro Manila
- City: Parañaque
- Region: Metro Manila
- Population: 424,153 (2020)
- Electorate: 213,261 (2025)
- Major settlements: 8 barangays: BF Homes; Don Bosco; Marcelo Green; Merville; Moonwalk; San Antonio; San Martin de Porres; Sun Valley
- Area: 27.99 km^{2} (10.81 sq mi)

Current constituency
- Created: 2003
- Representative: Brian Raymund S. Yamsuan
- Political party: NUP
- Congressional bloc: Majority

Parañaque's 2nd congressional district is one of the two congressional districts of the Philippines in the city of Parañaque. It has been represented in the House of Representatives of the Philippines since 2004. The districts consists of the eastern Parañaque barangays of BF Homes, Don Bosco, Marcelo Green, Merville, Moonwalk, San Antonio, San Martin de Porres and Sun Valley. It is currently represented in the 20th Congress by Brian Yamsuan of the National Unity Party (NUP).

The Parañaque City Hall is located in this district.

== Representation history ==
#	Image	Member	Term of office		Congress	Party	Electoral history	Constituent LGUs
#	Image	Member	Start	End	Congress	Party	Electoral history	Constituent LGUs
=== Parañaque's 2nd district for the House of Representatives of the Philippines ===
District created December 17, 2003 from Parañaque's at-large district.
1		Roilo Golez	June 30, 2004	June 30, 2013	13th	KAMPI	Elected in 2004.	2004–present BF Homes, Don Bosco, Marcelo Green, Merville, Moonwalk, San Antonio, San Martin de Porres, Sun Valley
1		Roilo Golez	June 30, 2004	June 30, 2013	14th	Lakas	Re-elected in 2007.	2004–present BF Homes, Don Bosco, Marcelo Green, Merville, Moonwalk, San Antonio, San Martin de Porres, Sun Valley
1		Roilo Golez	June 30, 2004	June 30, 2013	14th	Independent	Re-elected in 2007.	2004–present BF Homes, Don Bosco, Marcelo Green, Merville, Moonwalk, San Antonio, San Martin de Porres, Sun Valley
1		Roilo Golez	June 30, 2004	June 30, 2013	15th	Liberal	Re-elected in 2010.	2004–present BF Homes, Don Bosco, Marcelo Green, Merville, Moonwalk, San Antonio, San Martin de Porres, Sun Valley
2		Gustavo Tambunting	June 30, 2013	June 30, 2019	16th	UNA	Elected in 2013.	2004–present BF Homes, Don Bosco, Marcelo Green, Merville, Moonwalk, San Antonio, San Martin de Porres, Sun Valley
2		Gustavo Tambunting	June 30, 2013	June 30, 2019	17th	PDP–Laban	Re-elected in 2016.	2004–present BF Homes, Don Bosco, Marcelo Green, Merville, Moonwalk, San Antonio, San Martin de Porres, Sun Valley
3		Joy Myra Tambunting	June 30, 2019	June 30, 2022	18th	PDP–Laban	Elected in 2019.	2004–present BF Homes, Don Bosco, Marcelo Green, Merville, Moonwalk, San Antonio, San Martin de Porres, Sun Valley
3		Joy Myra Tambunting	June 30, 2019	June 30, 2022	18th	NUP	Elected in 2019.	2004–present BF Homes, Don Bosco, Marcelo Green, Merville, Moonwalk, San Antonio, San Martin de Porres, Sun Valley
(2)		Gustavo Tambunting	June 30, 2022	June 30, 2025	19th	NUP	Elected in 2022.	2004–present BF Homes, Don Bosco, Marcelo Green, Merville, Moonwalk, San Antonio, San Martin de Porres, Sun Valley
4		Brian Yamsuan	June 30, 2025	Incumbent	20th	Independent	Elected in 2025.	2004–present BF Homes, Don Bosco, Marcelo Green, Merville, Moonwalk, San Antonio, San Martin de Porres, Sun Valley
4		Brian Yamsuan	June 30, 2025	Incumbent	20th	NUP	Elected in 2025.	2004–present BF Homes, Don Bosco, Marcelo Green, Merville, Moonwalk, San Antonio, San Martin de Porres, Sun Valley

== Election results ==
=== 2025 ===
2025 Philippine House of Representatives election in the 2nd District of Parañaque
Party	Candidate	Votes	%
Independent	Brian Yamsuan	82,700	50.98%
NUP	Gustavo Tambunting (Incumbent)	72,765	44.85%
Independent	Rolando Aguilar	3,190	1.97%
Independent	Florentino Baguio	1,896	1.17%
WPP	Rodel Espinola	1,680	1.04%
Total votes		162,231	100.00%
Independent gain from NUP			

=== 2022 ===
2022 Philippine House of Representatives election in the 2nd District of Parañaque
Party	Candidate	Votes	%
NUP	Gustavo Tambunting	82,357	52.89%
Samahang Kaagapay ng Agilang Pilipino	Josef Maganduga	73,346	47.11%
Total votes		155,703	100.00%
NUP hold			

=== 2019 ===
2019 Philippine House of Representatives election in the 2nd District of Parañaque
Party	Candidate	Votes	%
PDP–Laban	Joy Myra Tambunting	103,028	89.45%
Independent	Pacifico Rosal	12,144	10.54%
Total votes		115,172	100.00%
PDP–Laban hold			

=== 2016 ===
2016 Philippine House of Representatives election in the 2nd District of Parañaque
Party	Candidate	Votes	%
UNA	Gustavo “Gus” Tambunting (Incumbent)	64,545	50.58%
Independent	Roilo Golez	61,493	48.19%
Independent	Pacifico Rosal	881	0.69%
Lakas	Pete Montaño	666	0.52%
Total votes		127,585	100.00%
UNA hold			

=== 2013 ===
2013 Philippine House of Representatives election in the 2nd District of Parañaque
Party	Candidate	Votes	%
UNA	Gustavo Tambunting	46,917	
Independent	Joey Marquez	39,381	
Independent	Pacifico Rosal	2,347	
Total votes			100.00%
UNA gain from Liberal			

=== 2010 ===
2010 Philippine House of Representatives election in the 2nd District of Parañaque
Party	Candidate	Votes	%
Liberal	Roilo Golez (Incumbent)	98,940	95.99
PMP	Pedro Cartajena Montaño	4,135	4.01
Valid ballots		103,075	87.88
Invalid or blank votes		14,209	12.12
Total votes		117,284	100.00
Liberal hold			

== See also ==
- Legislative districts of Parañaque
