= 2011 Manila Beechcraft Queen Air crash =

Air accident in the Philippines

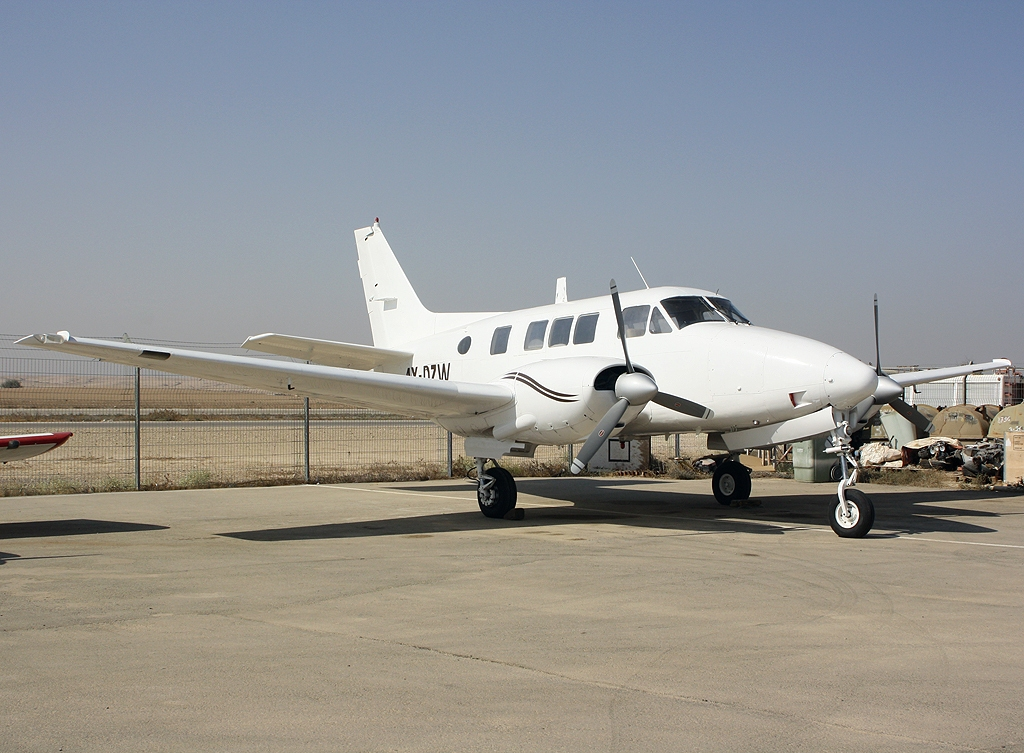
- A Beechcraft Queen Air similar to the accident aircraft

Accident
- Date: 10 December 2011
- Summary: EFTO leading to pilot error and loss of control
- Site: Don Bosco, Parañaque, Philippines; 14.4885°N 121.0258°E
- Total fatalities: 14
- Total injuries: 20

Aircraft
- Aircraft type: Beechcraft 65-80 Queen Air
- Operator: Aviation Technology Innovators
- Registration: RP-C824
- Flight origin: Ninoy Aquino International Airport, Metro Manila, Philippines
- Destination: San Jose Airport, Occidental Mindoro, Philippines
- Occupants: 3
- Crew: 3
- Fatalities: 3
- Survivors: 0

Ground casualties
- Ground fatalities: 11
- Ground injuries: 20

On 10 December 2011, a twin-engine Beechcraft Queen Air light aircraft crashed into a slum and burst into flames in Parañaque, Metropolitan Manila, Philippines, killing all three people on board and eleven on the ground. Twenty more people on the ground were injured.

The subsequent investigation found that an engine failure at take-off was not properly handled by the crew, which lost control of the aircraft at low altitude, without the possibility to recover before striking the ground.

== Accident ==
The twin-engine Queen Air took off at around 14:10 local time from runway 13 of Manila International Airport for a flight to San Jose Airport, on the island of Mindoro. Soon after take-off, the air traffic control (ATC) instructed the crew to turn right onto a southerly heading. Moments later, the crew requested permission to land back at the airport, which was granted, but when ATC asked whether they were experiencing difficulties, there was no response from the crew.

The Queen Air was observed by eyewitnesses flying at just 200 ft above the ground while making sputtering noises. It then banked left and suddenly rolled inverted, crashing into shanty houses next to the Felixberto Serrano Elementary School in Barangay Don Bosco, Parañaque.

All three occupants of the Queen Air were instantly killed, along with eleven people on the ground. Twenty more people were injured. An intense post-crash fire developed, burning several houses and destroying most of the elementary school, which was unoccupied at the time.

== Aftermath ==
After the crash, the Civil Aviation Authority of the Philippines (CAAP) decided to ground all of Aviation Technology Innovator's aircraft. At a press conference two weeks after the crash, CAAP officials stated that poor flying technique by the pilot was a possible cause of the crash. After the engine failure the aircraft was seen to turn left towards the dead engine, when the proper procedure in these circumstances would have been for the pilot to turn the aircraft to the right instead.

== Investigation ==
The investigation carried out by the Aircraft Accident Investigation and Inquiry Board of the Civil Aviation Authority of the Philippines found that the aircraft's left engine failed at take-off due to oil starvation.

The crew's "lack of event proficiency" and their failure to maintain control of the aircraft was cited as the immediate cause of the accident. Various contributing factors were listed, including inadequate training, inadequate maintenance procedures and lack of oversight by the regulating authority. The air traffic control's instruction to the crew to turn right immediately after take-off was also criticised for deviating from the airport's standard departure procedure, which would have reduced the risk of loss of control during low-altitude manoeuvres.
