= San Martin de Porres, Parañaque =

Barangay in Parañaque, Metro Manila, Philippines

San Martin de Porres
- Barangay
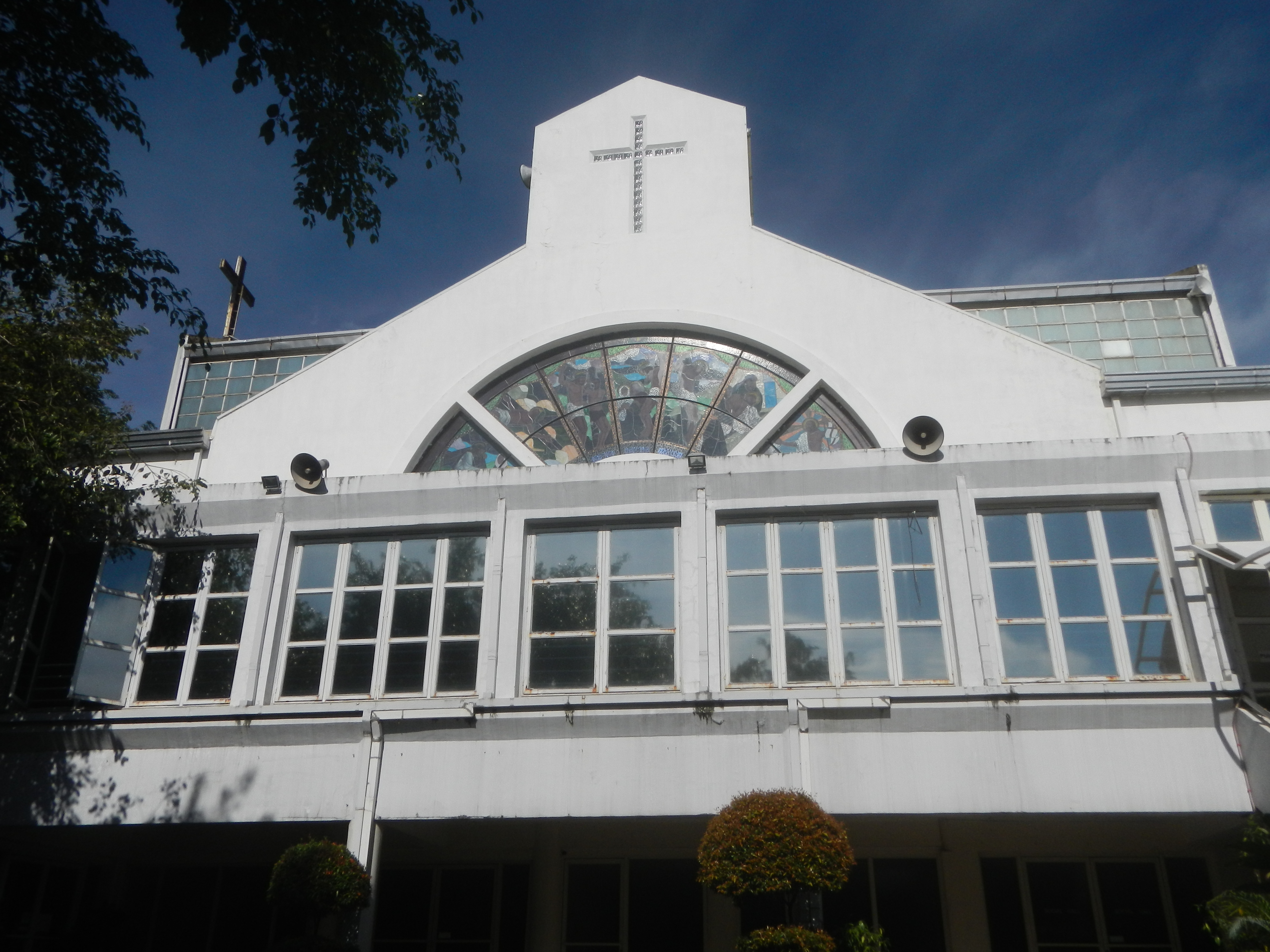
- San Martin de Porres Parish Church in United Hills Village

- Location within Metro Manila
- Coordinates: 14°28′54″N 121°2′33″E
- Country: Philippines
- Region: Metro Manila
- City: Parañaque
- Congressional districts: Part of the 2nd district of Parañaque
- Named for: Martin de Porres

Government
  - Barangay Chairman: Michael Thor Singson

Area
  - Total: 1.5565 km^{2} (0.6010 sq mi)

Population (2020)
  - Total: 20,283
  - Density: 13,031/km^{2} (33,751/sq mi)
- ZIP code: 1713
- Area code: 2

San Martin de Porres is an administrative division in southern Metro Manila, the Philippines. It is an elongated barangay located in the northeast corner of Parañaque adjoining the areas of Bicutan in Taguig and northern Muntinlupa. It is unique in that it is connected to the rest of Parañaque by only two bridges, one of which is a footbridge. Its western border follows the South Luzon Expressway, thus separating it from Merville, Sun Valley, Don Bosco and Marcelo Green. It neighbors Western Bicutan to the north, particularly the redevelopment area of the former Food Terminal Inc. (FTI) known as Arca South. To the east, it adjoins Taguig's barangays of Upper Bicutan, Central Bicutan, North Daang Hari and Tanyag. It neighbors South Daang Hari and Sucat, Muntinlupa to the south.

The village is roughly divided into three parts, the main residential area and housing development in the north by the Arca South development, the mixed commercial and residential area in the center by the Bicutan Interchange and the narrow industrial strip in the south. As of the 2020 census, it had a population of 20,283.

== Etymology ==
The barangay took its name from the parish church founded by the Roman Catholic Archdiocese of Manila in 1967 within the gated community of United Parañaque Subdivision Phase 1 (UPS1, now United Hills Village). The parish in turn was named after the patron saint and protector of mixed-race people and the first Black American saint from Lima, Peru canonized in 1962, Martin de Porres.

== History ==
Until the late 19th century, the village was a no man's land in the middle of a vast friar hacienda owned by the Order of Saint Augustine containing rice paddies and swamps between Parañaque (as La Huerta, San Dionisio and Don Galo were then called) and Bicutan. It was part of the then-sitio of Ibayo located in the Guadalupe plateau at an elevation of between 10 and 35 meters (33 and 115 ft) higher than the coastal elevation in the sitio's easternmost portion. In 1901, when Ibayo was reorganized as a barrio now known as Santo Niño, Mount Mani as the area was then called became one of its four sitios, along with Libro Balagbag (now part of Pasay), Dilain and Mataas na Kahoy. Subsequent development of the former friar estate as a U.S. airfield and military reservation and construction of the railroad line passing through this sitio towards the Bicol Region in the 1930s paved the way for the village's initial growth.

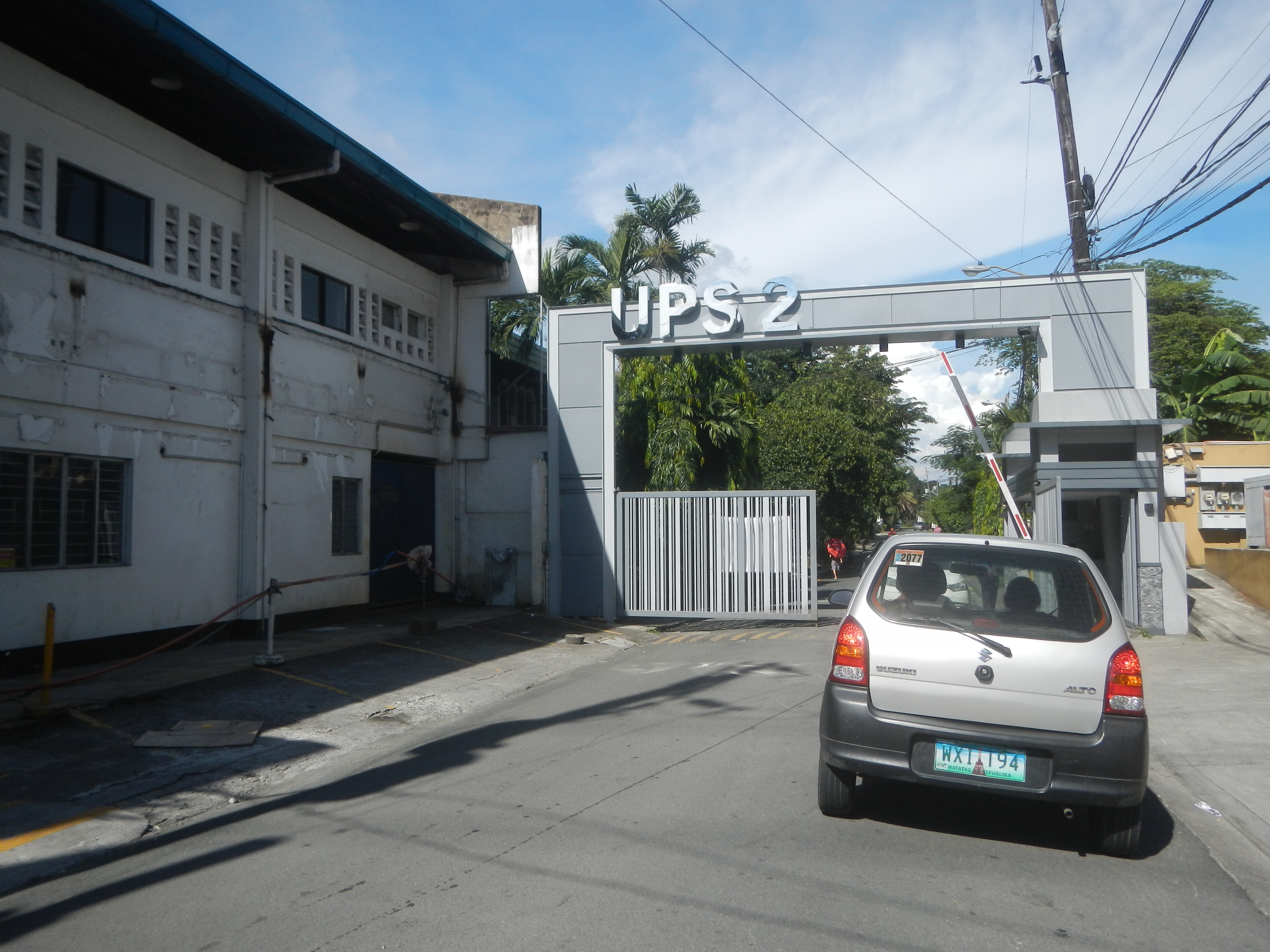
Entrance to United Parañaque Subdivision 2

With the destruction of Manila by the end of World War II came the mass exodus to the neighboring towns and the development of gated communities across the region, among them the United Parañaque Subdivision. By the late 1960s, the village became more accessible with the opening of the South Superhighway to Alabang, bringing with it new commercial and industrial enterprises, including the Greater Manila Terminal Food Market and the Philippine American Embroideries plant. And in 1978, the United Parañaque Subdivision, Marian Park, and Sitio de Asis, all physically separated by the superhighway, were officially separated from barangay Santo Niño to become a new barangay named San Martin de Porres through Presidential Decree No. 1324.

== Demographics ==
Year	Population
2007	23,519
2010	20,938
2015	21,181
2020	20,283
2024	15,377

== Education ==
San Martin de Porres is the location of the following educational institutions:

- Dr. Arcadio Santos National High School
- Regis Grace Montessori School
- St. Martin de Porres Kindergarten School
- Sucat Elementary School Annex

== Transportation ==
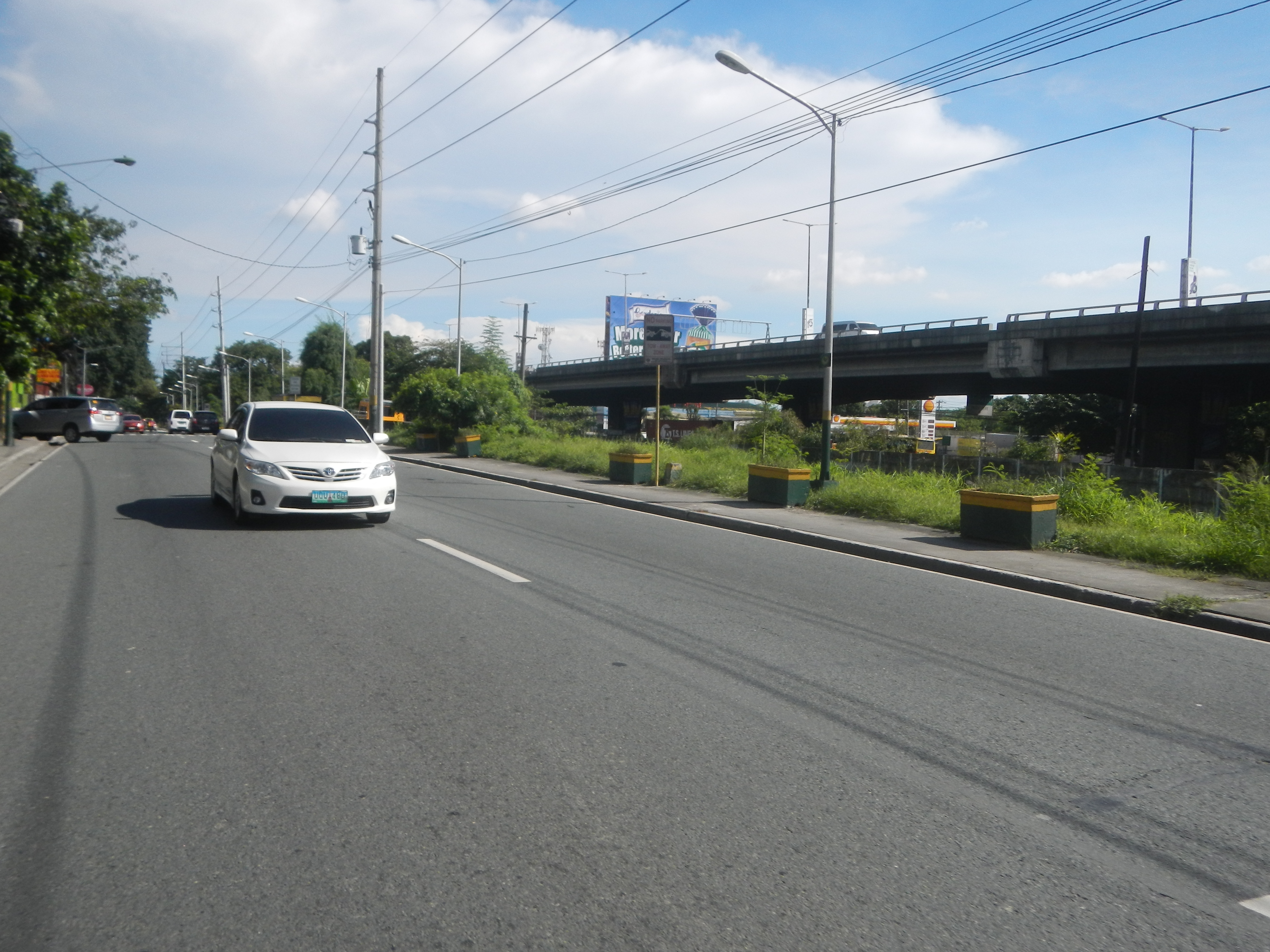
South Luzon Expressway East Service Road in San Martin de Porres

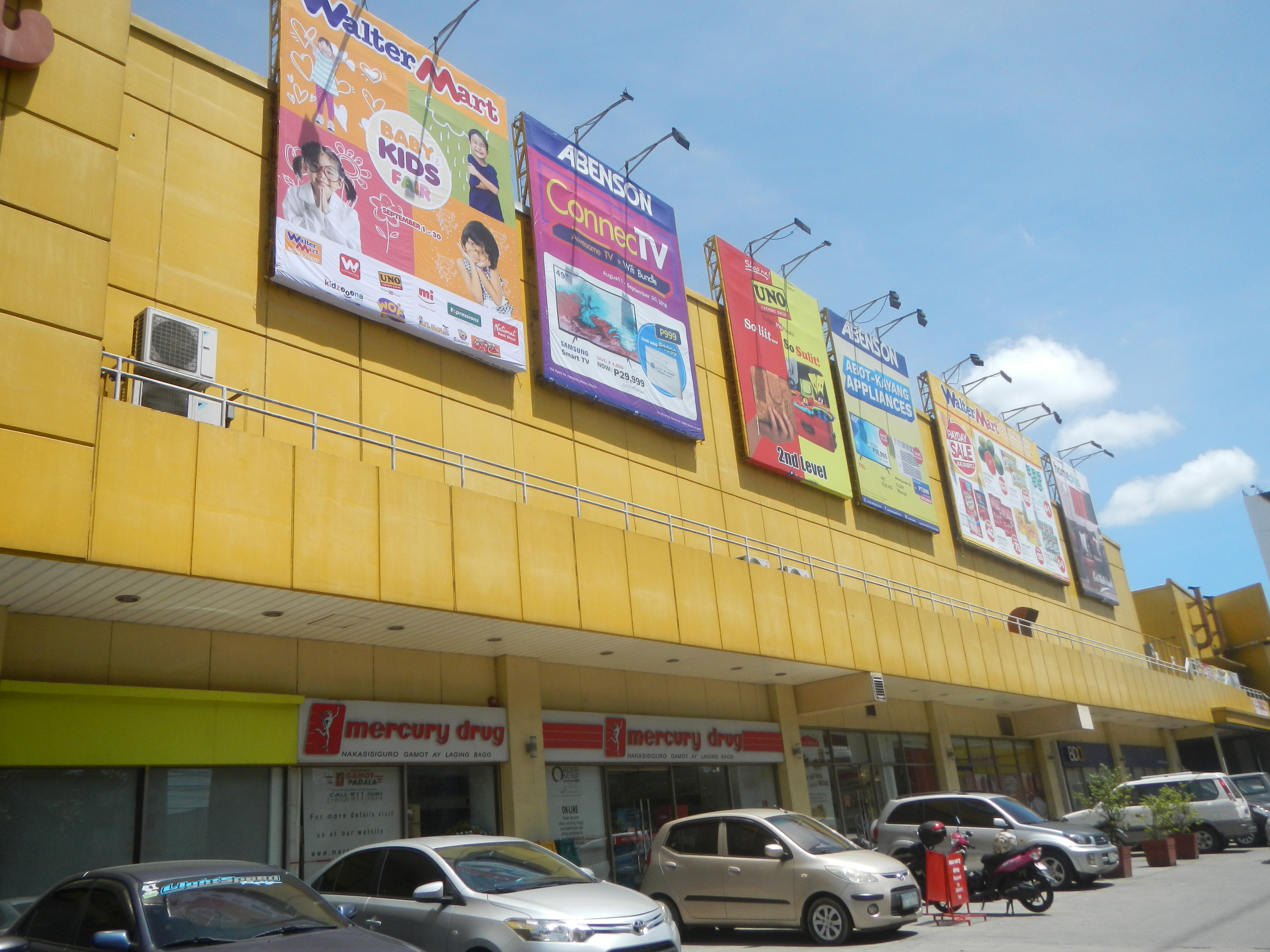
Walter Mart Bicutan shopping mall on East Service Road

The South Luzon Expressway and elevated Skyway run for approximately 4 kilometers (2.5 mi) along San Martin de Porres's western boundary. The main access road into the village and its principal north–south corridor is a frontage road east of the expressway which is a national tertiary road known simply as East Service Road. The village's only road link with Don Bosco and the rest of Parañaque is the Bicutan crossing at the three-level Bicutan Interchange serving as the junction between the South Luzon Expressway, Doña Soledad Avenue and General Santos Avenue, and between the Skyway and Doña Soledad Avenue. Its main east–west access road starts from this interchange as a continuation of Doña Soledad Avenue into Central and Lower Bicutan towards the Pateros-Alabang Road (Manuel L. Quezon Street) and C-6 Road on the shores of Laguna de Bay.

At the village's north end separating it from Western Bicutan and Arca South is Cucumber Road which gives access to the San Martin de Porres Barangay Hall and which is also linked to FTI Avenue and Tanyag Avenue in South Signal Village at its eastern terminus. This portion of San Martin de Porres is a predominantly slum area with 600 families living there when a fire broke out in August 2015.

Several Sitios on its eastern end, mainly Sitio Sampalocan and Sitio GSIS, could only be accessed by cramped one lane roads connecting to Rajah Sumakwel Street, Upper Bicutan, Taguig City, making them technical enclaves. A tricycle route operated by SUBTODAI connects these sitios to the DOST Terminal along East Service Road via Upper Bicutan, Taguig's Raja Trinanes and Rajah Sumakwel streets, and Central Bicutan, Taguig's A. Bonifacio Avenue.

Within the gated community of United Hills Village (UPS1) south of Cucumber Road linked to the East Service Road at its west end is its main street, Narra Street, which leads to the San Martin de Porres Parish Church. Just south of United Hills is Marian Park and UPS2 which is traversed by Marian Road where the Dr. Arcadio Santos National High School is situated. Its central section near General Santos Avenue is dominated by the Bicutan Market and Walter Mart Bicutan shopping mall. The village's southern portion is a narrow strip of warehouses fronting the East Service Road.

The Bicol Commuter and Metro South Commuter lines of the Philippine National Railways run along the median between East Service Road and South Luzon Expressway; the North–South Commuter Railway is under construction above these old lines. San Martin de Porres is served by the Bicutan railway station situated near the Bicutan Interchange where a 200-meter (660 ft) long footbridge also connects this village across the South Luzon Expressway to Don Bosco by the SM City Bicutan mall.
