= Moonwalk, Parañaque =

Barangay in Parañaque, Metro Manila, Philippines

Moonwalk
- Barangay
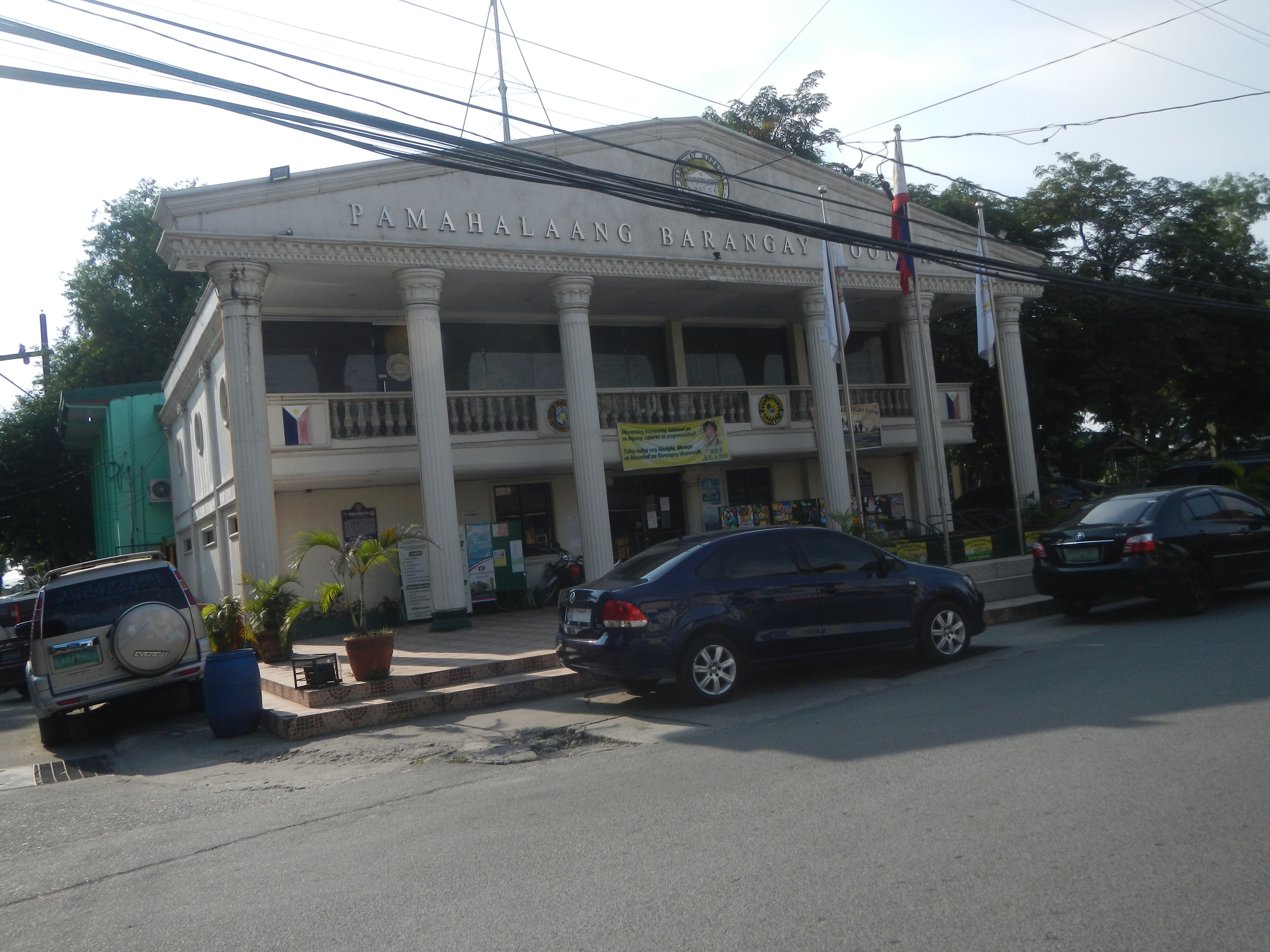
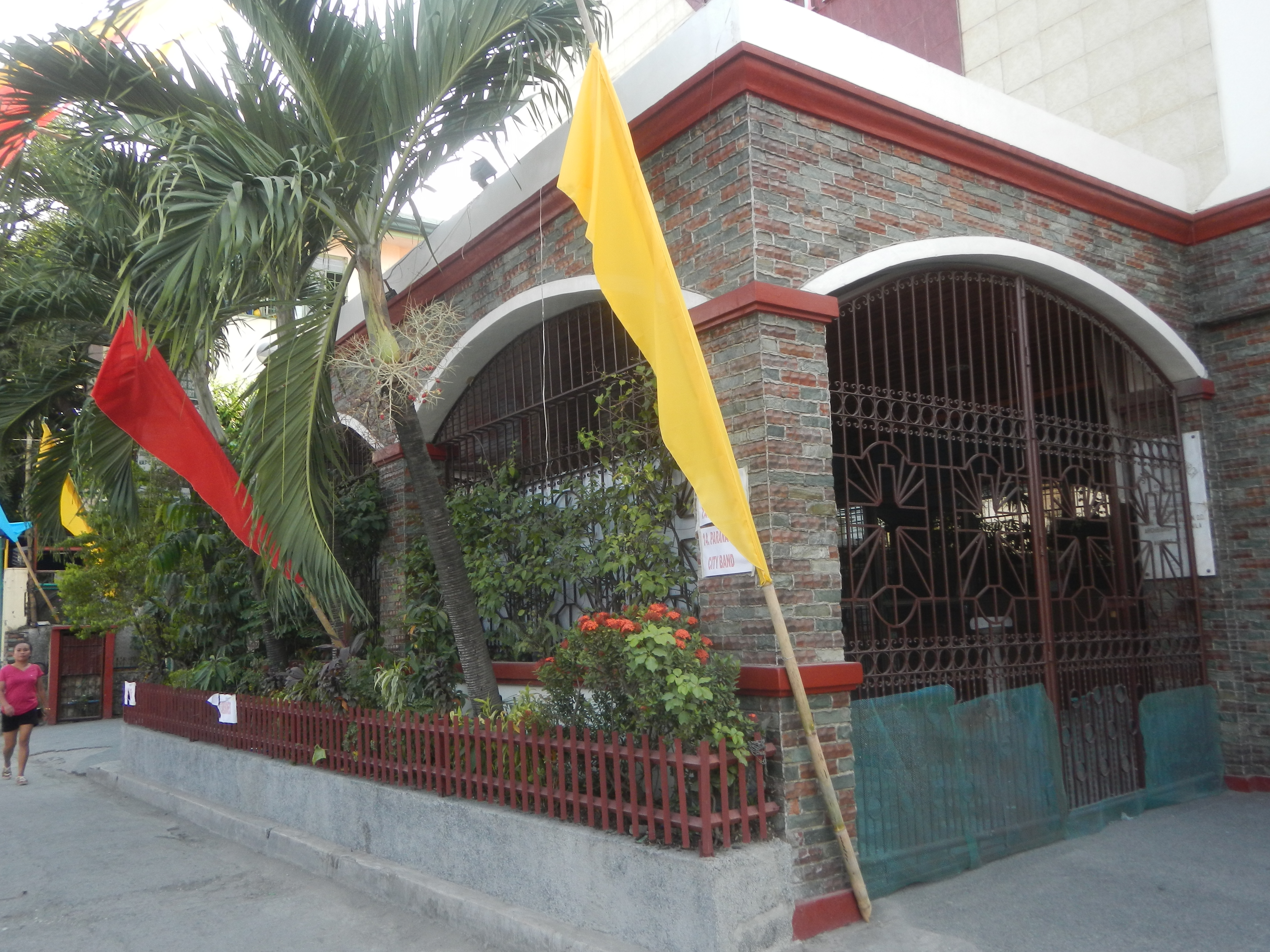
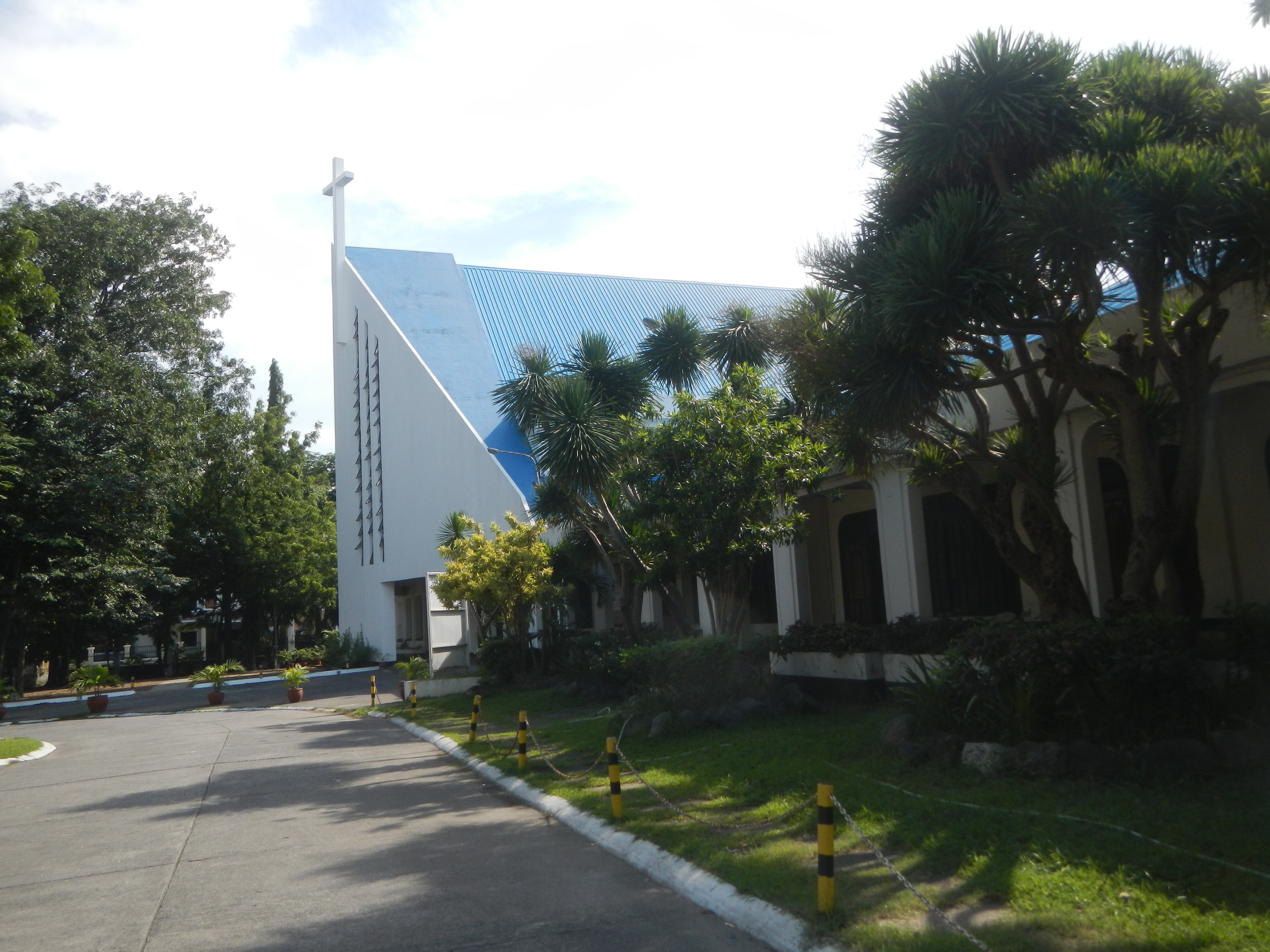
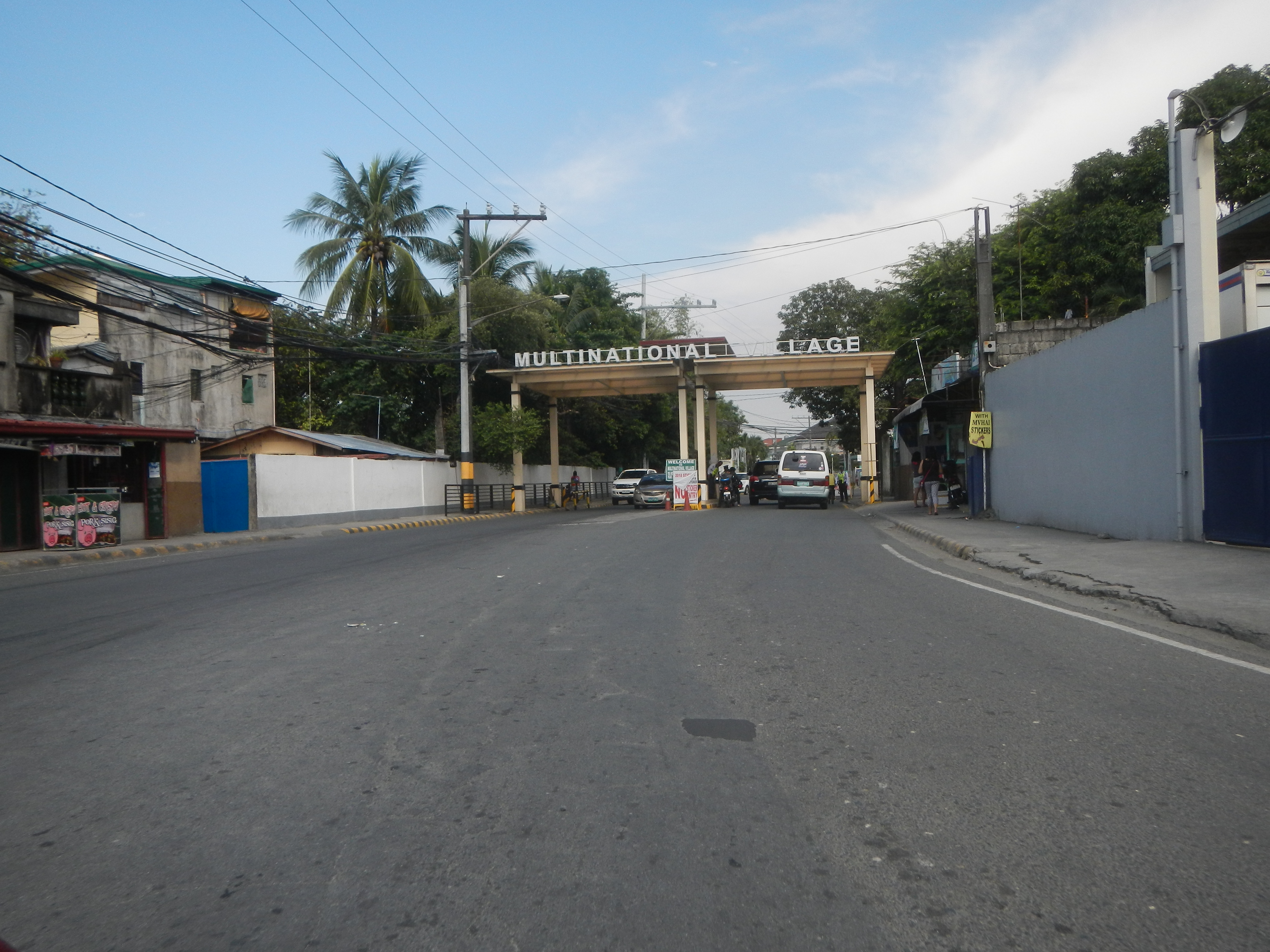
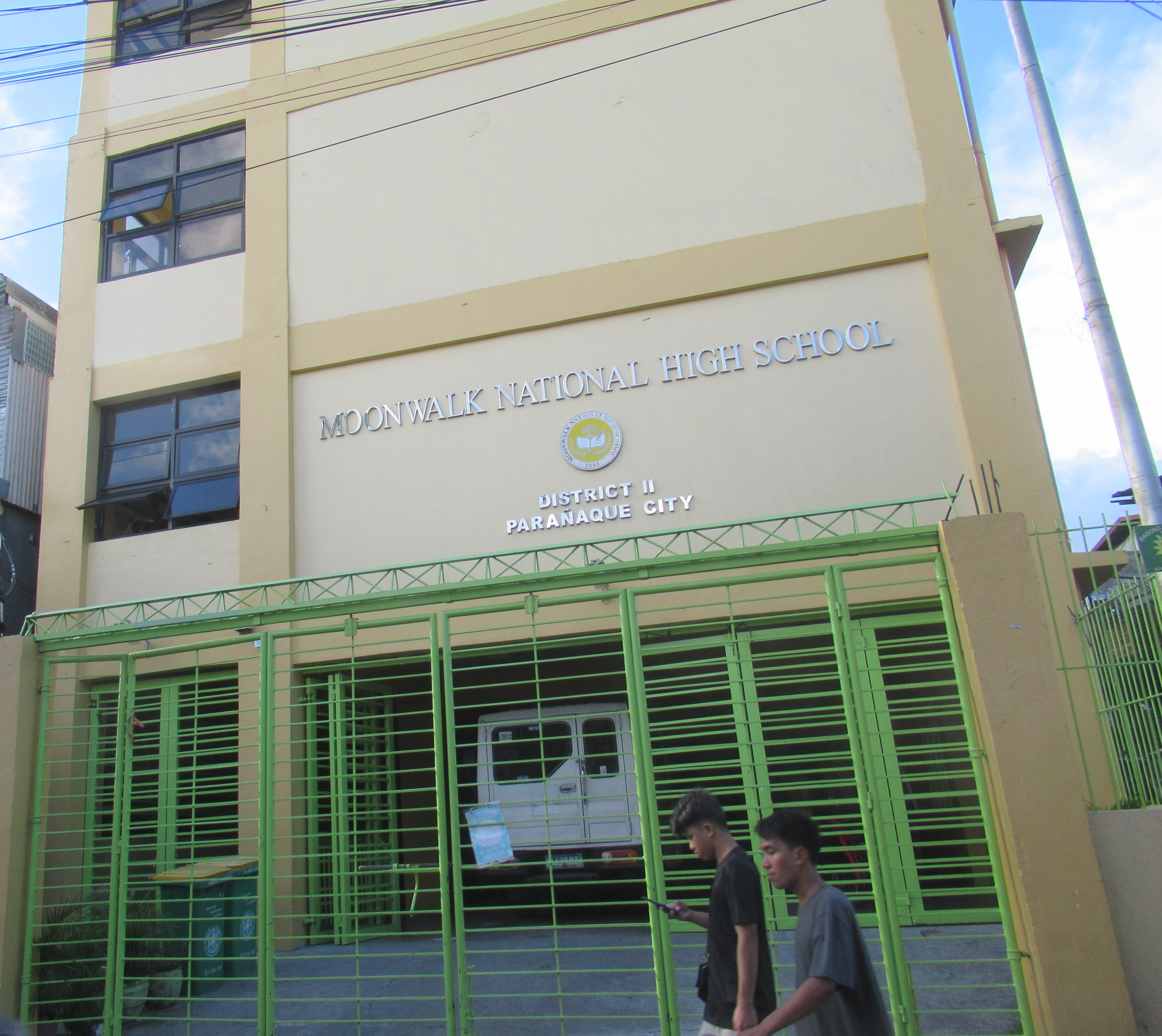
- Barangay hall San Agustin Parish Our Lady of the Most Holy Rosary Multinational Village entrance Moonwalk National High School
- Map of Moonwalk and the location of the barangay hall
- Moonwalk's location within Metro Manila Moonwalk's location within Luzon Moonwalk's location within the Philippines
- Coordinates: 14°29′30.69″N 121°0′52.82″E
- Country: Philippines
- Region: Metro Manila
- City: Parañaque
- District: District II
- Created: April 3, 1978

Government
  - Type: Sangguniang Barangay
  - Barangay Captain: Dr. Jemelene Qui
  - Barangay Councilor: Francis Esmero; Reynaldo Advincula; Eric Doy; Efren Reyes; Maximino Cristobal; Carlito Antipuesto, Jr.; Edward Louis Magyani
  - Sangguniang Kabataan Chairperson: Adrianne Bautista

Area
  - Land: 401.01 ha (990.9 acres)

Population (2024)
  - Total: 71,860
- Time zone: UTC+08:00
- ZIP Code: 1708 (Multinational Village); 1709 (Moonwalk)
- Area code: 02

Moonwalk, officially Barangay Moonwalk, is an urban barangay located in the second district of Parañaque, Philippines. As of the 2024 census, the population was 71,860. The barangay was created on April 3, 1978.

== History ==
The area that is Moonwalk today was once part of a barrio called Pulu, which was shown in a map published in 1885 during the Spanish colonial period in the Philippines. Its land was used in agriculture and salt making. Moonwalk was created on April 3, 1978, after then-President Ferdinand Marcos signed Presidential Decree No. 1321 that would detach the subdivisions Moonwalk Phase I and II, Bricktown Phase 1, 2, and 3, and Multinational Village from Barangay Sto. Niño to form an independent barangay. The barangay's name was based on Moonwalk subdivision, which itself was named after the Moon landing mission of Apollo 11. When then-President Gloria Macapagal Arroyo signed Republic Act No. 9229 in December 2003 to divide Parañaque into two congressional districts, the barangay became part of the newly formed second district.

== Geography ==
Moonwalk has a total land area of 401.01 hectares. It has four adjacent barangays: Merville on the northeast, Don Bosco on the east, San Isidro on the southeast, San Dionisio on the southwest, and Sto. Niño on the northwest.

The barangay can be accessed via access roads in Merville Subdivision, Villanueva Subdivision, and Multinational Village. It can also be accessed via Doña Soledad Avenue and the old E. Rodriguez Avenue at the side of the perimeter wall of Ninoy Aquino International Airport.

=== Climate ===
Climate data for Moonwalk
| Month | Jan | Feb | Mar | Apr | May | Jun | Jul | Aug | Sep | Oct | Nov | Dec | Year |
|---|---|---|---|---|---|---|---|---|---|---|---|---|---|
| Record high °C (°F) | 32 (90) | 33 (91) | 35 (95) | 36 (97) | 36 (97) | 34 (93) | 33 (91) | 32 (90) | 32 (90) | 32 (90) | 32 (90) | 32 (90) | 36 (97) |
| Mean daily maximum °C (°F) | 29 (84) | 30 (86) | 32 (90) | 34 (93) | 32 (90) | 31 (88) | 29 (84) | 29 (84) | 29 (84) | 30 (86) | 30 (86) | 29 (84) | 30 (87) |
| Mean daily minimum °C (°F) | 21 (70) | 20 (68) | 21 (70) | 22 (72) | 24 (75) | 25 (77) | 24 (75) | 24 (75) | 24 (75) | 23 (73) | 22 (72) | 21 (70) | 23 (73) |
| Record low °C (°F) | 18 (64) | 18 (64) | 19 (66) | 20 (68) | 22 (72) | 23 (73) | 23 (73) | 23 (73) | 22 (72) | 21 (70) | 20 (68) | 18 (64) | 18 (64) |
| Average precipitation mm (inches) | 10 (0.4) | 10 (0.4) | 12 (0.5) | 27 (1.1) | 94 (3.7) | 153 (6.0) | 206 (8.1) | 190 (7.5) | 179 (7.0) | 120 (4.7) | 54 (2.1) | 39 (1.5) | 1,094 (43) |
| Average precipitation days | 5.2 | 4.5 | 6.4 | 9.2 | 19.7 | 24.3 | 26.9 | 25.7 | 24.4 | 21 | 12.9 | 9.1 | 189.3 |
Source: Meteoblue

== Demographics ==
Historical population
| Year | Population | ±% |
|---|---|---|
| 1980 | 10,243 | — |
| 1985^{*} | — | — |
| 1990 | 21,912 | — |
| 1995 | 27,739 | +26.6% |
| 2000 | 41,645 | +50.1% |
| 2007^{**} | 49,680 | +19.3% |
| 2010 | 59,614 | +20.0% |
| 2015 | 67,723 | +13.6% |
| 2020 | 72,520 | +7.1% |
| 2024 | 71,860 | −0.9% |
* No census was held in 1985 due to a political and economic crisis ** Census was delayed from the original 2005 due to the reenacted budget that lasted until 2006; Source: National Census and Statistics Office (1980 and 1990 census), National Statistics Office (1995, 2000, 2007, and 2010 census), and Philippine Statistics Authority (2015, 2020, and 2024 census)

As of the 2024 Philippine census, there were 71,860 people in Moonwalk.

== Government ==
Carlito "Doods" Antipuesto, who had served as a city councilor for three terms, won the barangay elections in October 2013 as the barangay captain (Filipino: kapitan ng barangay) of Moonwalk, succeeding Clemente Advincula. In May 2015, Antipuesto died. He was replaced by barangay councilor (Filipino: barangay kagawad) Roberto Alano in June 2015. The incumbent barangay captain is Dr. Jemelene "Jem" Qui, who took oath on November 6, 2023, after winning the barangay and Sangguniang Kabataan elections that year. The incumbent barangay councilors are Francis Esmero, Reynaldo Advincula, Eric Doy, Efren Reyes, Maximino Cristobal, Carlito Antipuesto, Jr., and Edward Louis Magyani. Adrianne Bautista is the current Sangguniang Kabataan chairperson.

== Economy ==
The livelihood of Moonwalk residents in the past relied on farming and fishing, with women also participating in the barong tagalog embroidery business. As of 2021, the barangay has seen a commercial growth with 2,120 business establishments.

== Education ==
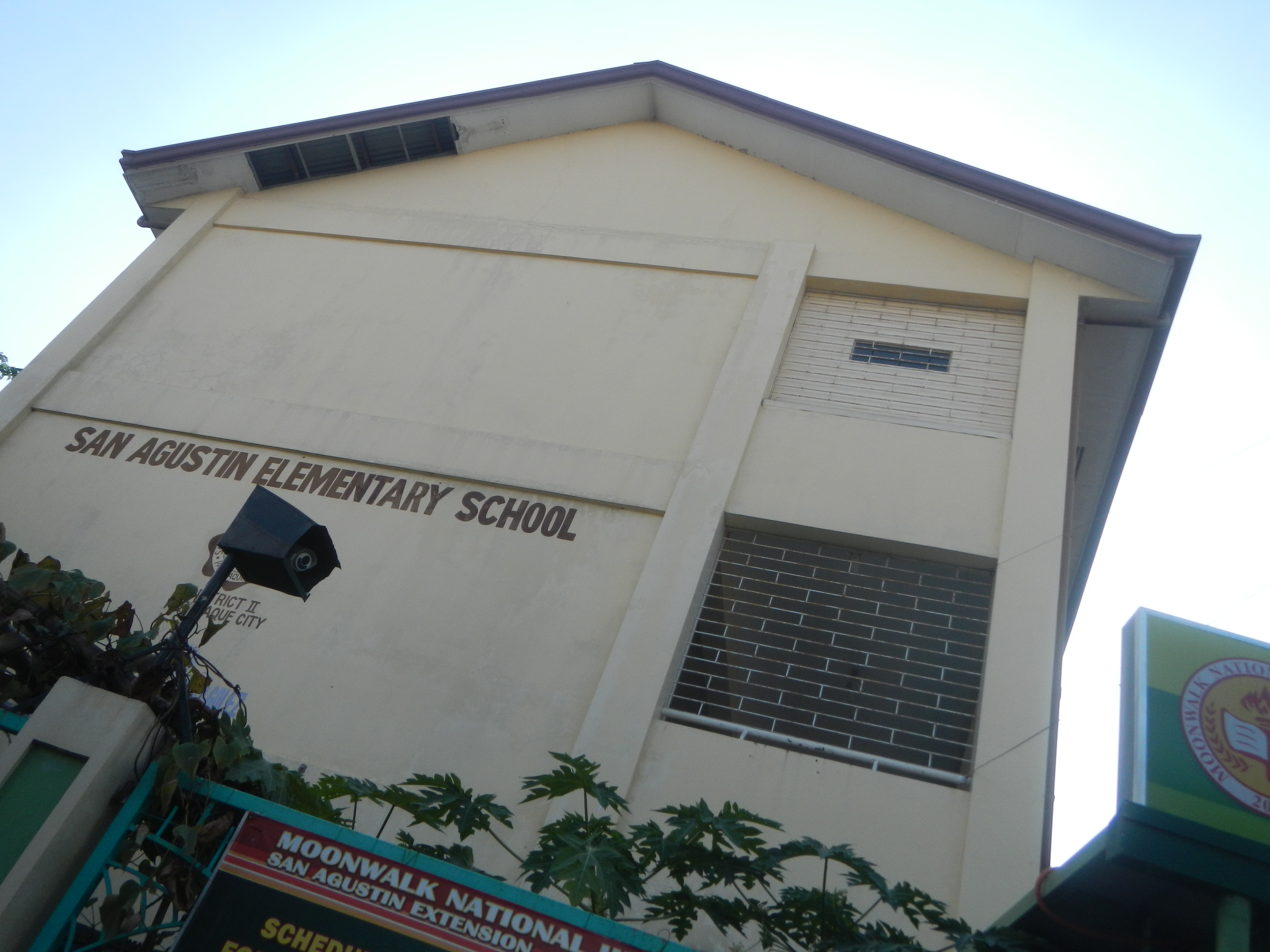
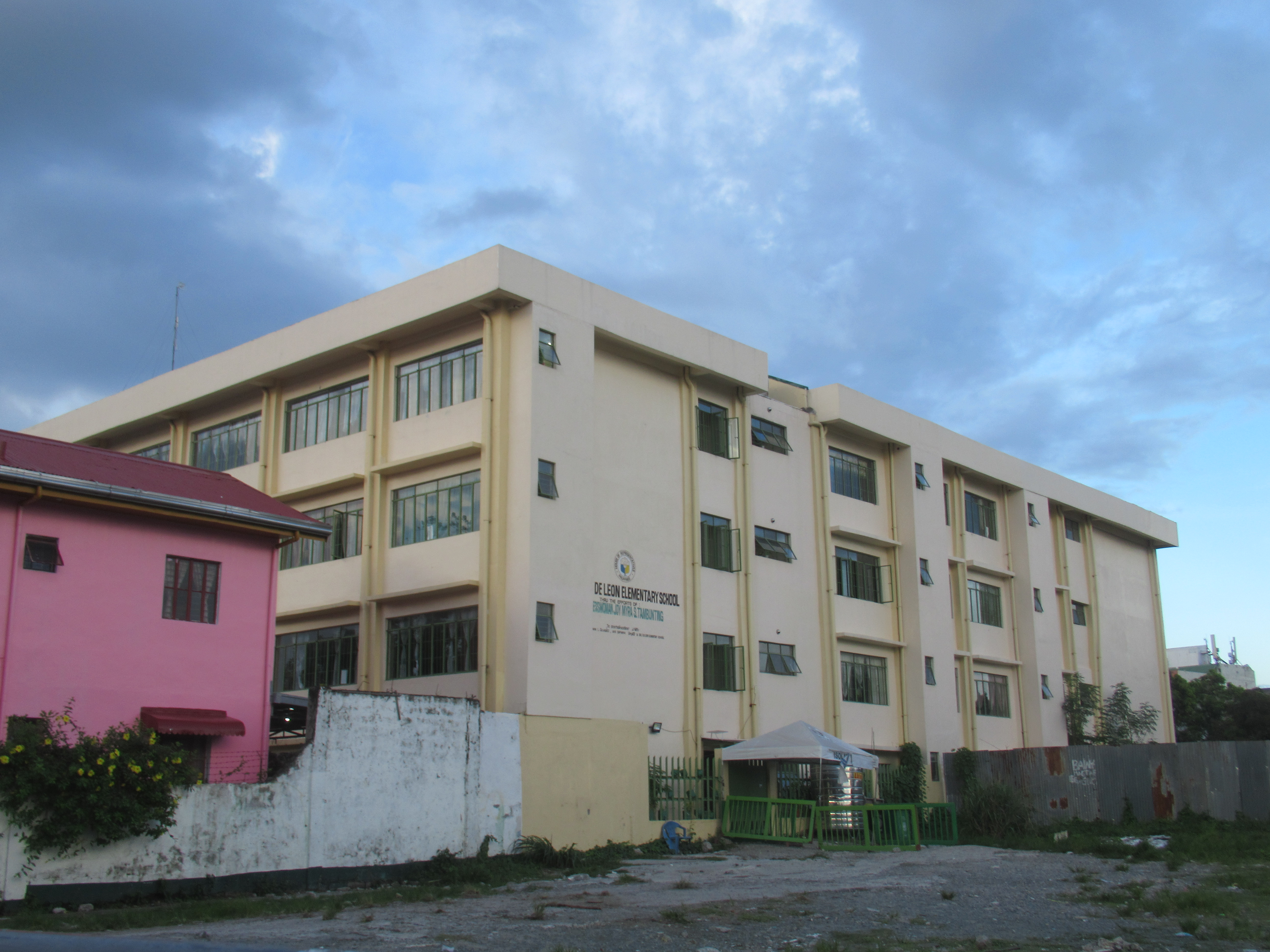
San Agustin Elementary School (L) and Col. E. De Leon Elementary School (R)

As of December 26, 2021, Moonwalk has two public elementary schools, San Agustin Elementary School and Col. E. De Leon Elementary School, and one public high school, Moonwalk National High School. The barangay has six private schools: Arandia College, Blessed Aldeheid Academy, Madre Maria Pia Notary School, Philippians Academy, Parañaque Risen Christ School, Pean Integrated School of Parañaque, Multinational Sacred Heart School, and St. Hannibal Multi-level School. The schools offer pre-school and elementary education, but Multinational Sacred Heart has high school and Arandia can offer up to college education.

The barangay has 9 day care centers with 11 day care workers:

- Phase 1 Day Care Center
- Airborneville Day Care Center
- Velarde Compound Day Care Center
- Airport Village Day Care Center
- San Agustin Day Care Center
- Tel-Aviv Day Care Center
- S.M.G.I. Day Care Center
- Manggahan Day Care Center
- SAMAPA Day Care Center

Other pre-school and learning centers can also be found in the barangay:

- Abenton Learning Center
- Animo Kids Learning Center
- Bricktown Learning Center
- Bright Computer Learning Center
- Connecting Horizon Learning Center
- D'Archangels ARC Academy
- Global Christian Academy
- Kids Town Learning Center
- Richfield Child Development Center
- White Play Learning Center
- Whiz Kids Home-based Learning Center

== Landmarks ==
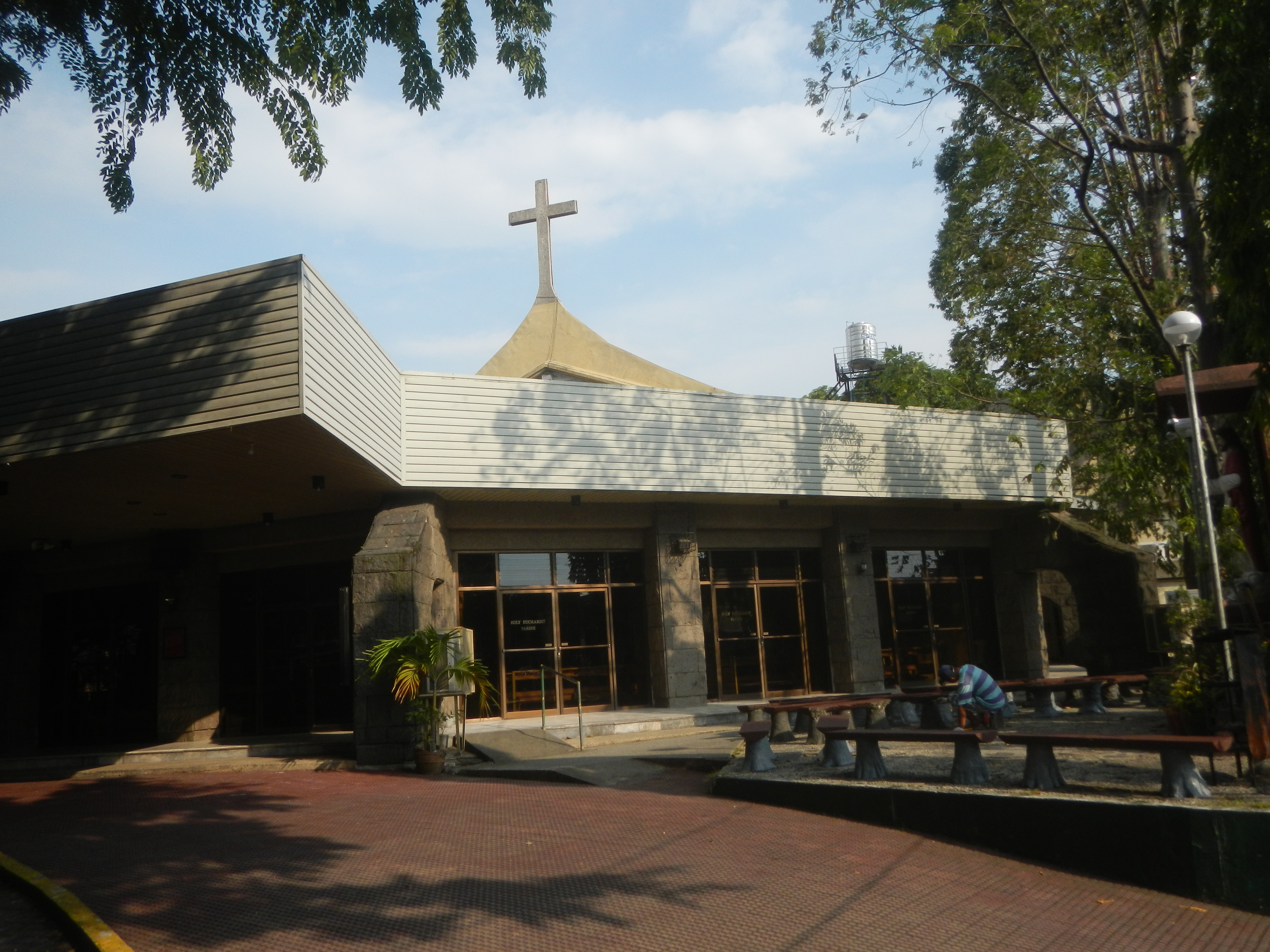
Holy Eucharist Parish

There are three Catholic churches built in Moonwalk: Holy Eucharist Parish, Our Lady of the Most Holy Rosary, and San Agustin Parish. Additionally, one church belonging to the Korean Union Church of Manila and one meetinghouse belonging to the Church of Jesus Christ of Latter-day Saints can also be found in the barangay.

Several condominiums can be found in the barangay: Chateau Elysee developed by SM Development Corporation, Isabelle Garden Villas developed by Techno-Asia Construction & Development, and Kassel Residences developed by CHMI Land.

== Infrastructure ==
=== Transportation ===
==== Roads ====
Inside Moonwalk, the major roads are Armstrong Avenue, E. Rodriguez Avenue, and Fastrack, while the secondary roads are St. Francis St., Daang Batang St., and Multinational Avenue. As of December 26, 2021, the total road network of the barangay is approximately 38.1 kilometers.

==== Jeepneys ====
As of July 2023, the jeepneys operated by Multinational Transport Service Cooperative ply inside Moonwalk, particularly passing through Multinational Village via Multinational Avenue.

==== Tricycles ====
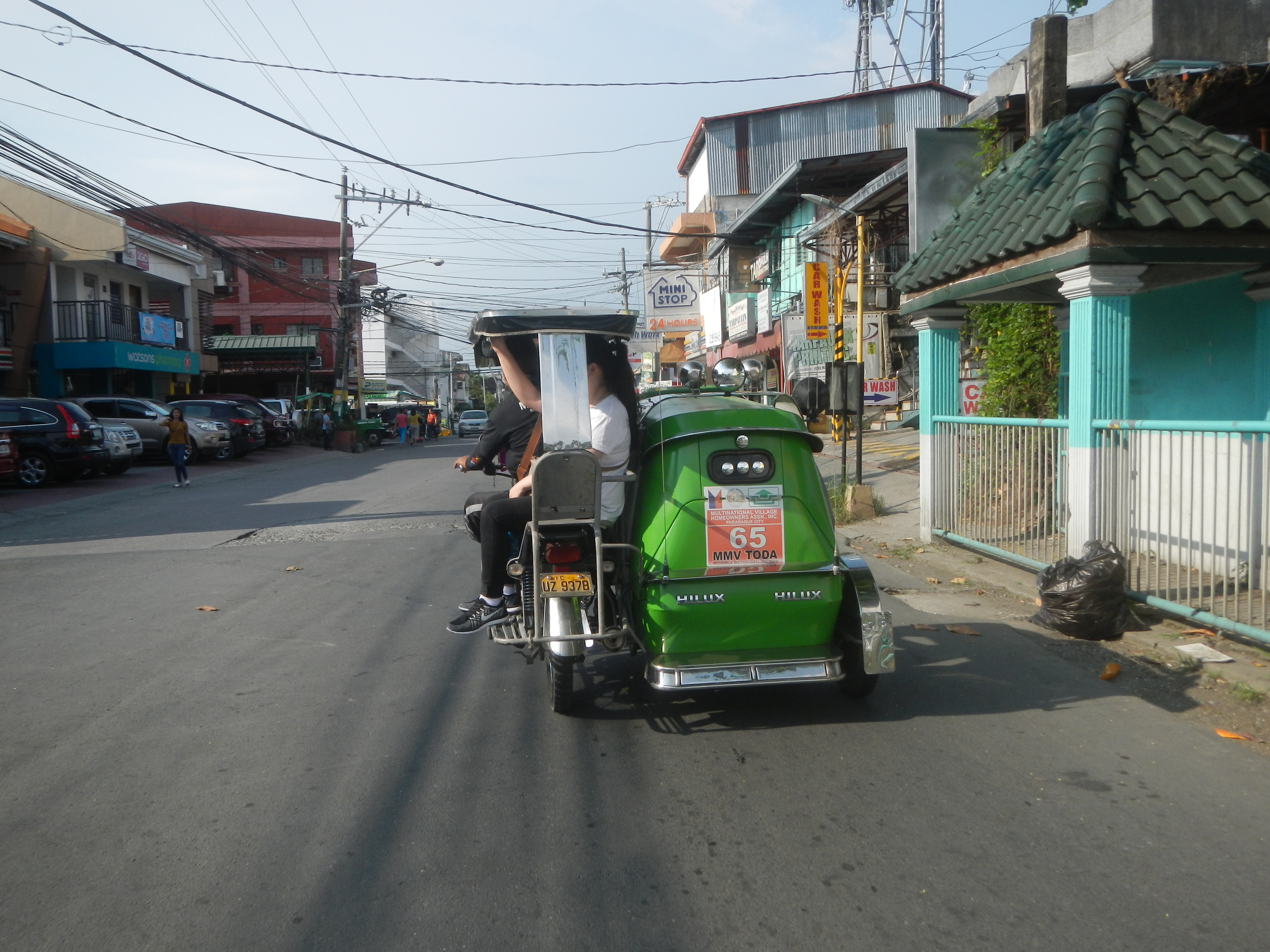
A tricycle belonging to Moonwalk Multinational Village TODA (MMVTODA)

As of December 26, 2021, there are nine accredited tricycle operators, called Tricycle Operator and Driver Association (TODA), plying inside Moonwalk:

- Bricktown TODA (BRICKTODA)
- Residence of Moonwalk Village TODA (ROMVITODA)
- Bliss Multinational Village TODA (BMVTODA)
- Moonwalk Multinational Village TODA (MMVTODA)
- Rodriguez Moonwalk TODA (RODMOTODA)
- Barangay Moonwalk TODA (BARMOTODA)
- Fastrack Moonwalk TODA (FAMOTODA)
- Villanueva Multinational TODA (VMTODA)
- San Agustin Village Tricycle Service Association, Inc. (SAVTSAI)

=== Health care ===
Moonwalk has its barangay health center, called Moonwalk Health Center, which is located along St. Francis Street. A maternity clinic in the barangay, named CJM Birthing Home, can be found along Fastrack.
