= La Huerta, Parañaque =

Barangay in Parañaque, Metro Manila, Philippines

La Huerta
- Barangay
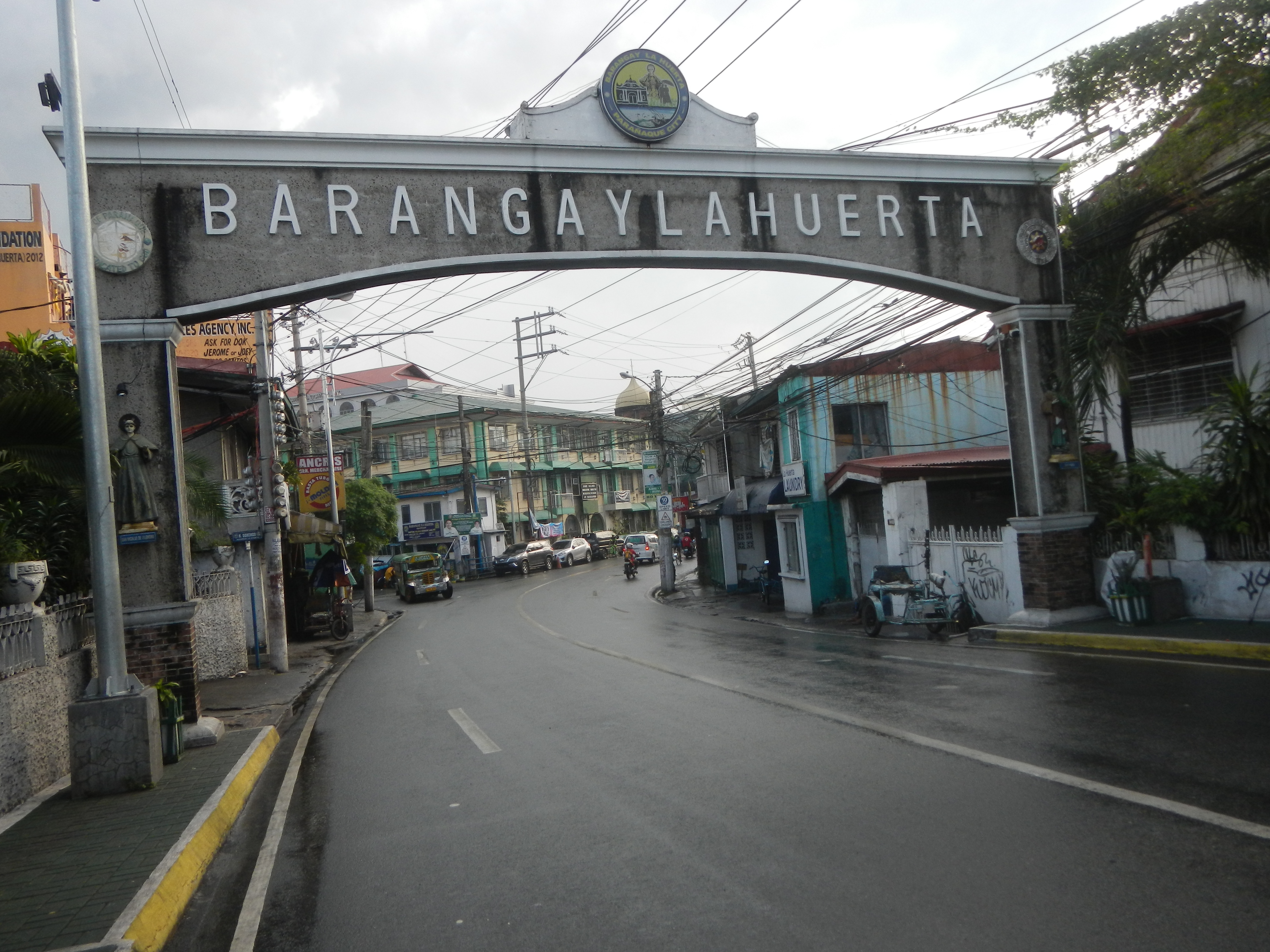
- La Huerta welcome arch from Don Galo
- Interactive map of La Huerta
- Coordinates: 14°29′50″N 120°59′43″E
- Country: Philippines
- Region: Metro Manila
- City: Parañaque
- Congressional districts: Part of the 1st district of Parañaque

Government
  - Barangay Chairman: Peter Augustine Velasco

Area
  - Total: 0.5372 km^{2} (0.2074 sq mi)

Population (2020)
  - Total: 8,592
  - Density: 15,990/km^{2} (41,420/sq mi)
- ZIP code: 1700
- Area code: 2

La Huerta (English: The Garden) is a barangay in the city of Parañaque, Metro Manila, Philippines. It comprises a section of the old municipal center (poblacion) of Parañaque along the south bank of the Parañaque River by its mouth in Manila Bay. The coastal village encompasses the area from Don Galo on the north, Santo Niño (former Ibayo) and Moonwalk on the east and San Dionisio on the south. A portion of Global Airport Business Park along C-5 Road Extension is also under the jurisdiction of La Huerta. It also extends west to the reclaimed area in Manila Bay and covers the northernmost section of Freedom Island in the Las Piñas–Parañaque Critical Habitat and Ecotourism Area. As of the 2020 census, it had a population of 8,592.

== History ==
The village was named after an orchard that stood in the area during the Spanish colonial period. The first known European to visit the area was the Catholic missionary Fray Juan de Orto of the Order of Saint Augustine, who arrived in 1575. Five years later, La Huerta was established as the center of the Augustinian missionary town of Parañaque. It was also in 1580 when the mission of San Andrés el Apóstol (today the Cathedral of Saint Andrew) was completed under of Fray Diego de Espinar as its first head. Out of this settlement grew the visitas and towns of Don Galo, Tambo, San Dionisio, and Las Piñas in southern Manila Province, which was then transferred to the supervision of the Order of Augustinian Recollects.

In 1776, the Recollects built the chapel of San Nicolás de Tolentino east of the Augustinian convent by the Parañaque River. This stone chapel was used as barracks for Spanish soldiers during the Philippine Revolution.

In 1890, Presidencia, the first municipal hall of Parañaque, was built in front of St. Andrew Parish Church (present-day Parañaque Cathedral), suggesting La Huerta was the old municipal center of Parañaque. This housed the municipal government until 1971, when it moved to the present-day city hall in San Antonio Valley Subdivision, then in San Dionisio. The site of the old municipal hall was replaced by Ospital ng Parañaque.

From being the second biggest barrio in Parañaque after San Dionisio in the early 20th century, La Huerta is now the second smallest barangay in the city at 0.5372 square kilometers (0.2074 sq mi) after several villages were created out of its old territory in the 1970s, including Don Bosco, Marcelo Green, Sun Valley and Merville.

In 1985, the Manila–Cavite Expressway was opened on a reclaimed area in the foreshore of La Huerta. The village also expanded with the creation of Freedom Island by the Philippine Reclamation Authority in the 1970s and 1980s as part of the South Reclamation Project under Boulevard 2000.

In July 2026, La Huerta officially expanded its boundary westward into the northernmost portion of Freedom Island in the Las Piñas–Parañaque Critical Habitat and Ecotourism Area, after voters ratified City Ordinance No. 2023-19 that implements a straight-line boundary approach.

== Demographics ==
Year	Population
2007	7,298
2010	8,788
2015	9,569
2020	8,592
2024	11,850

== Education ==
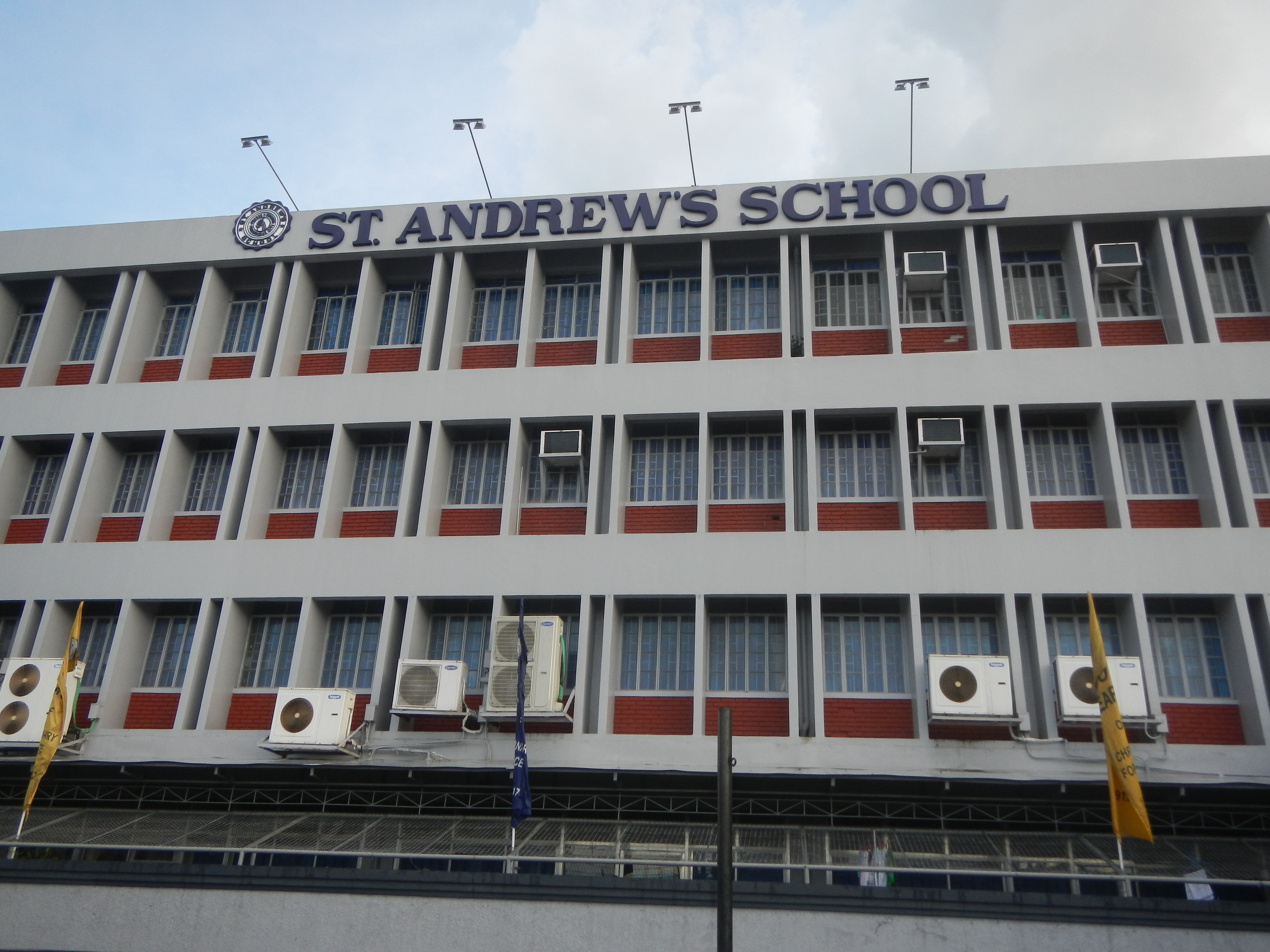
St. Andrew's School in La Huerta

La Huerta is home to the oldest school in Parañaque, St. Andrew's School established in 1917.

The following educational institutions are also located within the village:

- La Huerta Elementary School
- La Huerta National High School
- St. Paul College of Parañaque

== Culture ==
La Huerta is known for its colorful fiestas such as the biannual Sunduan festival where local bachelors in their barong Tagalog fetch their dates from their homes dressed in traje de mestiza and carrying a parasol, and parade them around town to the San Nicolas chapel at the town plaza. This festival is held in honor of the village's patron, Saint Nicholas of Tolentino, and dates back to 1876. The village also hosts the Caracol festival where men carry cascos or floats with effigies of saints held biannually in September since 1912.

== Transportation ==
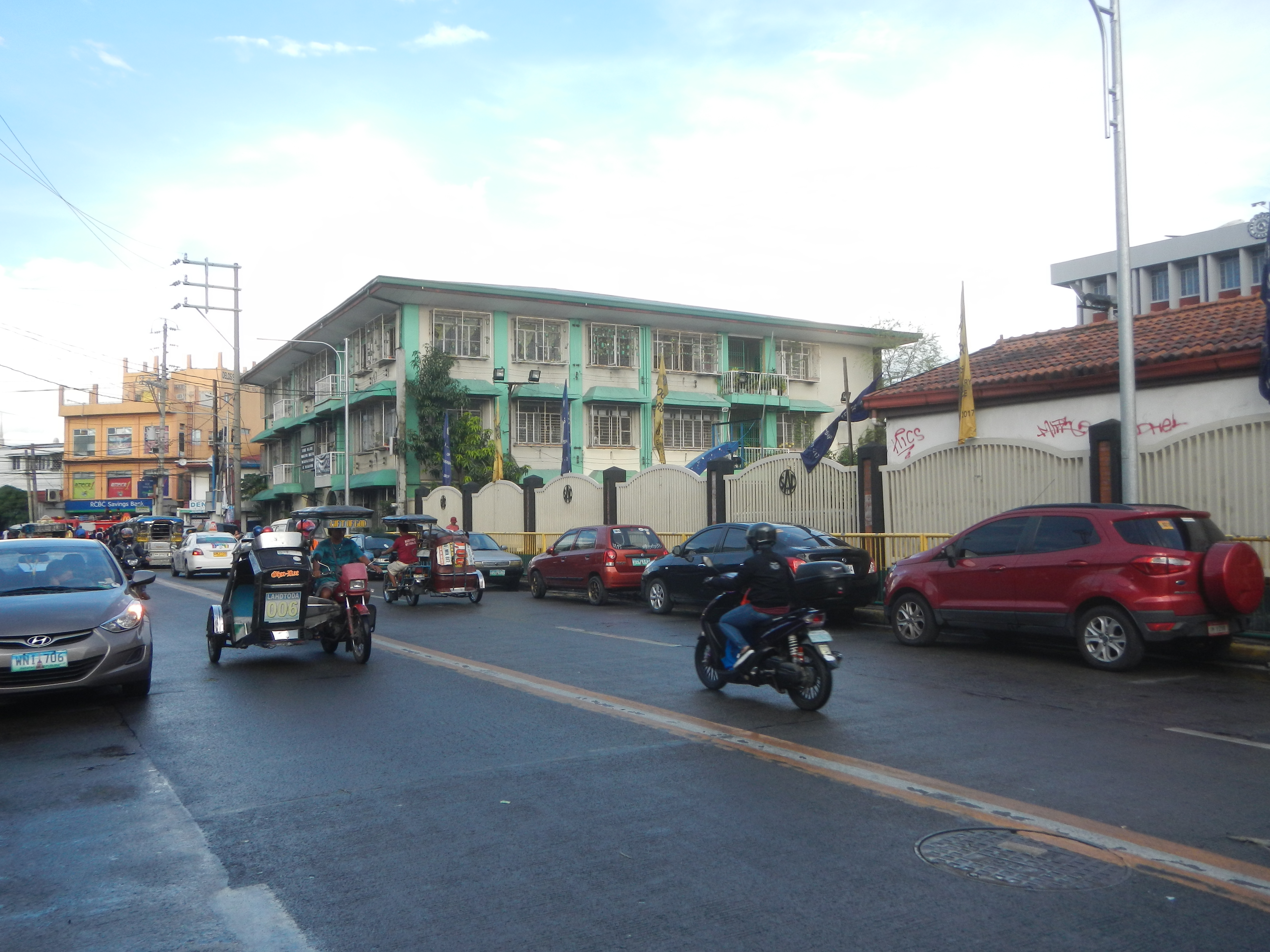
Elpidio Quirino Avenue, La Huerta's main street

Being the old town proper of Parañaque where the municipal hall once stood, several major thoroughfares are routed through La Huerta. They include Elpidio Quirino Avenue (formerly Calle Real), the former main street that runs north–south across the old district in the area of the Parañaque Cathedral, and Ninoy Aquino Avenue which gives access to Ninoy Aquino International Airport. The Manila–Cavite Expressway travels along the western edge of the old center, and an extension of C-5 Road also runs along its eastern sector. The C-5 South Link Expressway will parallel the existing C-5 network and will also cut through the village's eastern sector once completed.

The planned Manila Light Rail Transit System Line 1 extension to Cavite includes the construction of a station on Ninoy Aquino Avenue in La Huerta.

== Notable residents ==
- Florencio Bernabe Jr., Mayor of Parañaque (2004–2013)
- Florencio Bernabe Sr., Mayor of Parañaque (1965–1986)
- Manuel Bernabé, Spanish language writer and Rizal 1st District Representative (1928–1931)
- Patricio Bernabé, Municipal President of Parañaque (1902–1903)
- Timoteo Bernabé, Municipal President of Parañaque (1898–1899)
- Francisco Mendoza de Leon, Bishop of the Roman Catholic Diocese of Antipolo (2016–present)
