= Merville, Parañaque =

Barangay in Parañaque, Metro Manila, Philippines

Merville
- Barangay
- Barangay Merville
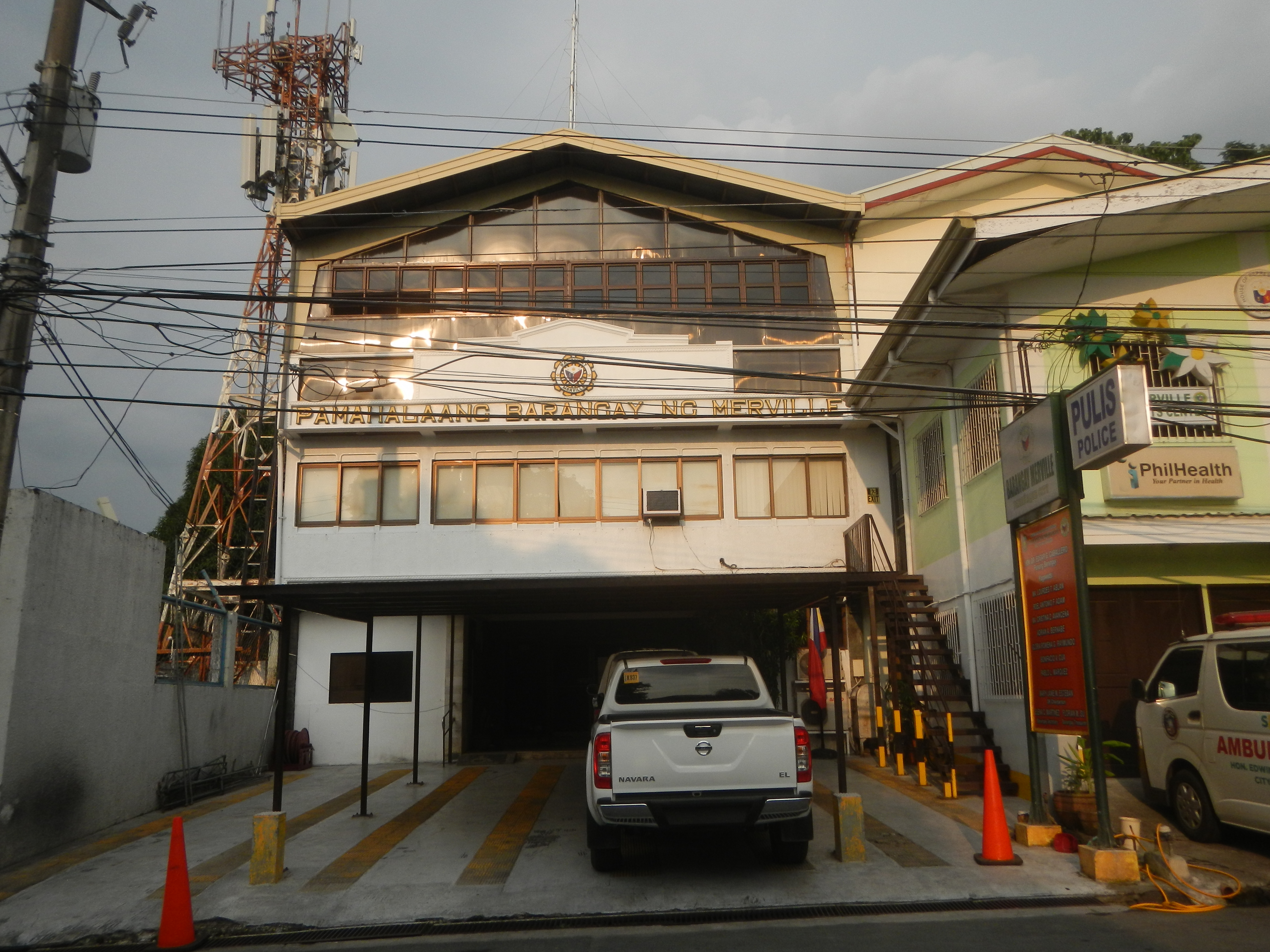
- Merville Barangay Hall

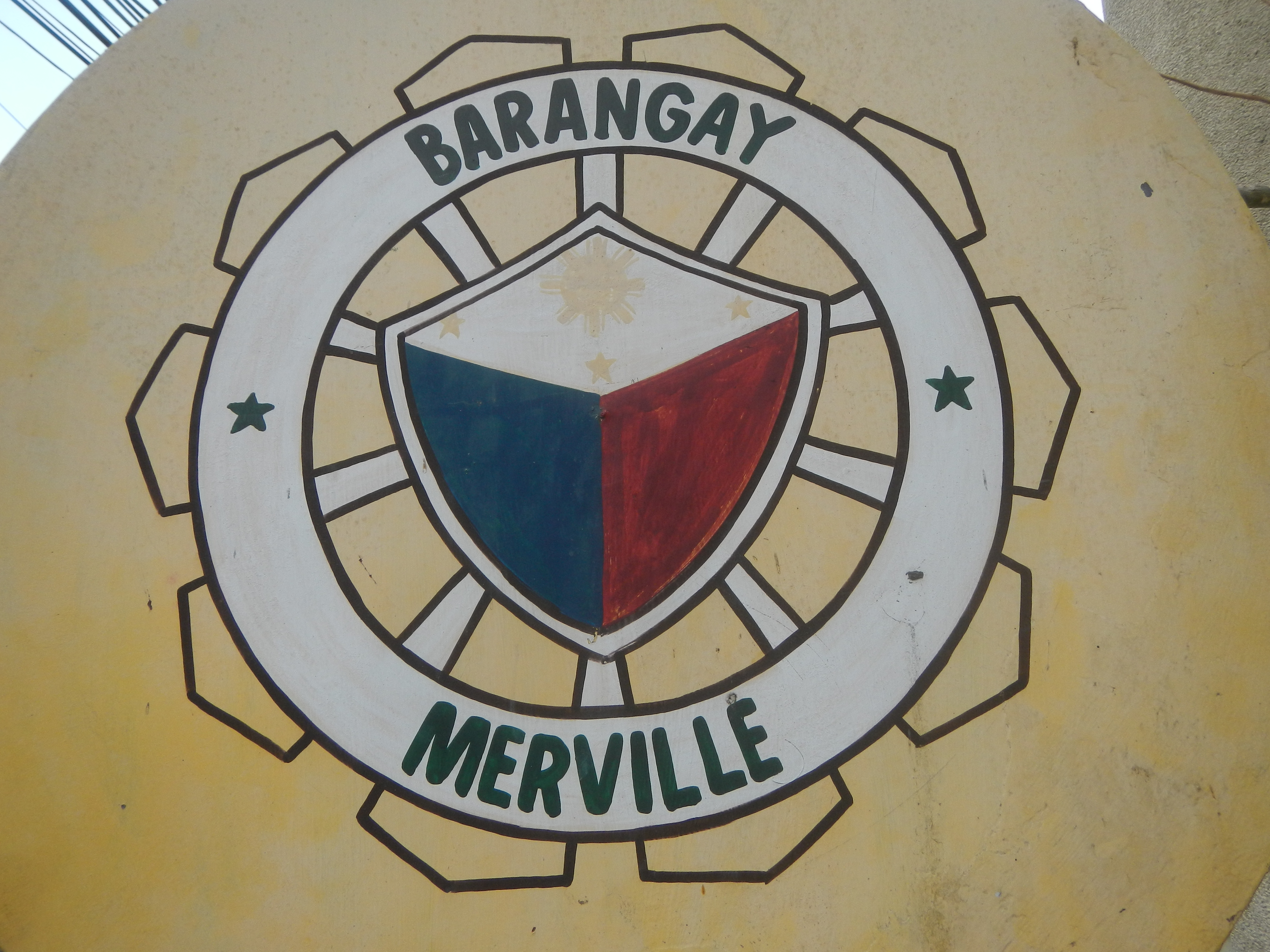
- Seal
- Etymology: Meralco Village
- Interactive map of Merville
- Location of Merville in Metro Manila
- Coordinates: 14.499969°N 121.027627°E
- Country: Philippines
- Region: Metro Manila
- City: Parañaque
- District: 2nd district of Parañaque
- Established: April 3, 1978

Government
  - Barangay Chairperson: Edgar G. Caballero

Area
  - Total: 3.044 km^{2} (1.175 sq mi)

Population (2020)
  - Total: 26,615
  - Density: 8,743/km^{2} (22,650/sq mi)

Merville, officially Barangay Merville, is a barangay in Parañaque part of the city's second district. it was created on April 3, 1978 out of barangay La Huerta.

Merville is bordered to the east by the city of Taguig and barangay San Martín de Porres, to the west is barangay Moonwalk, to the south are the barangays of Sun Valley and Don Bosco, and to the north is the city of Pasay.

== History ==
Barangay Merville was established out of Barangay La Huerta on April 3, 1978, by virtue of Presidential Decree No. 1325 signed by President Ferdinand Marcos. It initially included Admiral Village and Merville subdivisions.

According to historian Dulce Festin-Baybay, Merville is short for Meralco Village.

== Government ==
Merville was led by barangay captain Edgar G. Caballero. His current successor is Capitan "Ad" Bernabe. Alongside the barangay captains, there are various smaller neighboorhood associations, such as Buena Vida, Molave Park, and South Admiral VIllage.

== Demographics ==
Historical population
Year	Pop.	±%
1980	7,661	—
1990^{*}	12,620	+64.7%
1995	14,719	+16.6%
2000	13,241	−10.0%
2007^{**}	17,118	+29.3%
2010	20,391	+19.1%
2015	27,508	+34.9%
2020	26,615	−3.2%
2024	34,153	+28.3%
* No census was held in 1985 due to a political and economic crisis ** Census was delayed from the original 2005 due to the reenacted budget that lasted until 2006

As of 2024, the population of Merville is 34,153.
