= Don Bosco, Parañaque =

Barangay in Parañaque, Metro Manila, Philippines

Don Bosco
- Barangay
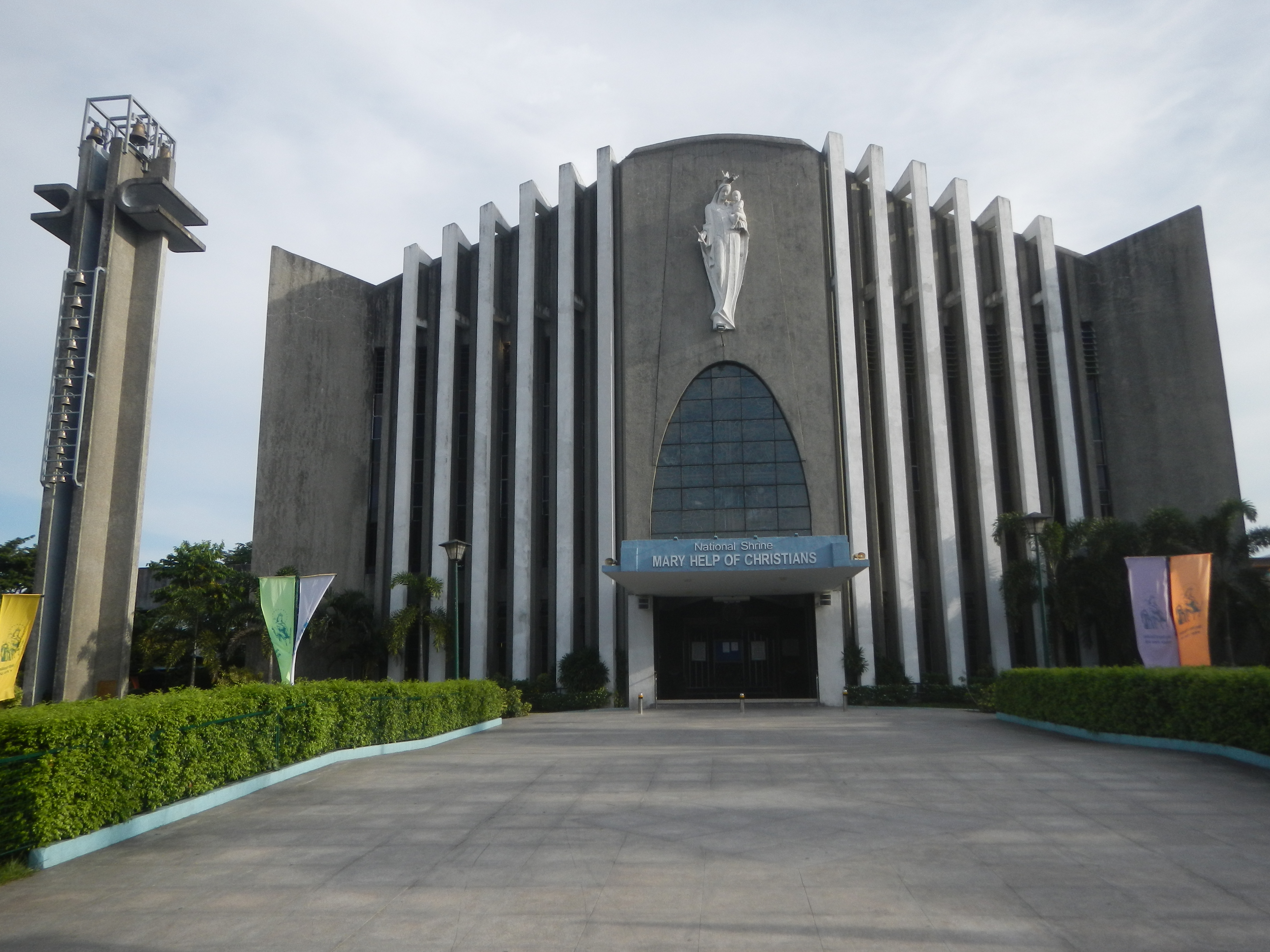
- National Shrine of Mary Help of Christians Parish
- Interactive map of Don Bosco
- Location within Metro Manila
- Coordinates: 14°28′54″N 121°1′33″E
- Country: Philippines
- Region: Metro Manila
- City: Parañaque
- Congressional districts: Part of the 2nd district of Parañaque
- Established: April 3, 1978
- Named for: John Bosco

Government
  - Barangay Chairman: Mario L. Jimenez

Area
  - Total: 3.8475 km^{2} (1.4855 sq mi)

Population (2020)
  - Total: 54,188
  - Density: 14,084/km^{2} (36,477/sq mi)
- ZIP code: 1711/1714
- Area code: 2

Don Bosco is an administrative division in Parañaque, Metro Manila, Philippines. It is one of sixteen barangays that make up the city of Parañaque situated along either side of Doña Soledad Avenue from South Luzon Expressway west to Diamond Street in Cecilia Village. Part of the Parañaque 2nd district, Don Bosco is the third largest barangay in the city and is bordered by Don Bosco Creek which separates it from Merville's namesake gated community, Country Village and Lion's Park Residences to the north, Sun Valley's namesake gated village and Siena Park to the northeast, San Martin de Porres across the South Luzon Expressway to the east, Marcelo Green to the southeast, Baloc-Baloc Creek which separates it from San Antonio's namesake community, Greenheights Village and Malacañang Village to the south, and Moonwalk's namesake community, Airport Village and Multinational Village to the west.

Don Bosco is a primarily residential barangay south of Ninoy Aquino International Airport. It is a collection of middle-to-upper class subdivisions, the largest of which is Better Living Subdivision, as well as a few slum areas along its creeks and in between its gated villages. Its main commercial corridor lies along Doña Soledad Avenue and includes the SM City Bicutan shopping mall at its east end. As of the 2020 census, Don Bosco had a population of 54,188.

== History ==
=== Pre-foundation ===
The barangay formed part of the missionary town founded by the Order of Saint Augustine in 1580. The town included large agricultural landholdings from Malibay and Maricaban in the north to Las Piñas in the south. By the later part of the Spanish colonial rule, the land of the present-day barangay was a sitio annexed to the barrio of La Huerta, which also included Wawa, Balong Munti, Kaybiga, Matadto, Masaligsig, Kalang-kalangan, Kay Almirante, Pugad Lawin, Hapay na Mangga, Lambak, Pasong Malalim, Pasong Kawayan, Bahay Buaya, Magasawang Mangga, Tarundon, Kay Matsing, Pasong Papaya, Pasong Malabon and Manuyo.

During American rule, many of the friar estates were purchased by the U.S. government under the Friar Lands Act including the Hacienda de Maricaban which they converted into a military airfield and reservation. The rest were then resold to tenant farmers and eventually repurchased by the government through the People's Homesite Corporation (the forerunner of the National Housing Authority (Philippines)). The Parañaque estate which covered 129 hectares (320 acres) of land in present-day Don Bosco was one such landholding acquired by the housing agency in 1959 through broker Julio T. de la Cruz who individually contacted owners of the land in the said estate who agreed to the sale. A year later in 1960, President Carlos P. Garcia approved its transfer to private ownership and development as a private housing subdivision in order to "liquidate the outstanding obligations" of the "heavily-indebted" state corporation. The People's Homesite Corporation and Everwealth Inc. finalized the sale in March 1961 and construction on the access road into the estate from the then-newly built South Superhighway soon started. The first gated subdivisions there were developed by Better Living Inc. and Tropical Homes Inc.

On May 24, 1972, a piece of land in Better Living Subdivision was donated to the Salesians of Don Bosco in the Philippines by its developers and owners, former Foreign Affairs Secretary Felixberto Serrano and former People's Homesite and Housing Corporation board member Soledad L. Dolor, for the construction of a parish church and shrine dedicated to Mary Help of Christians. The formation house and residence for Salesian candidates to the priesthood studying theology known as the Don Bosco Center of Studies was built there in the same year. The Roman Catholic Archdiocese of Manila created the parish in June 1975 and the shrine was consecrated in December 1976 during the silver jubilee celebrations of Salesians of Don Bosco in the Philippines.

=== Foundation ===
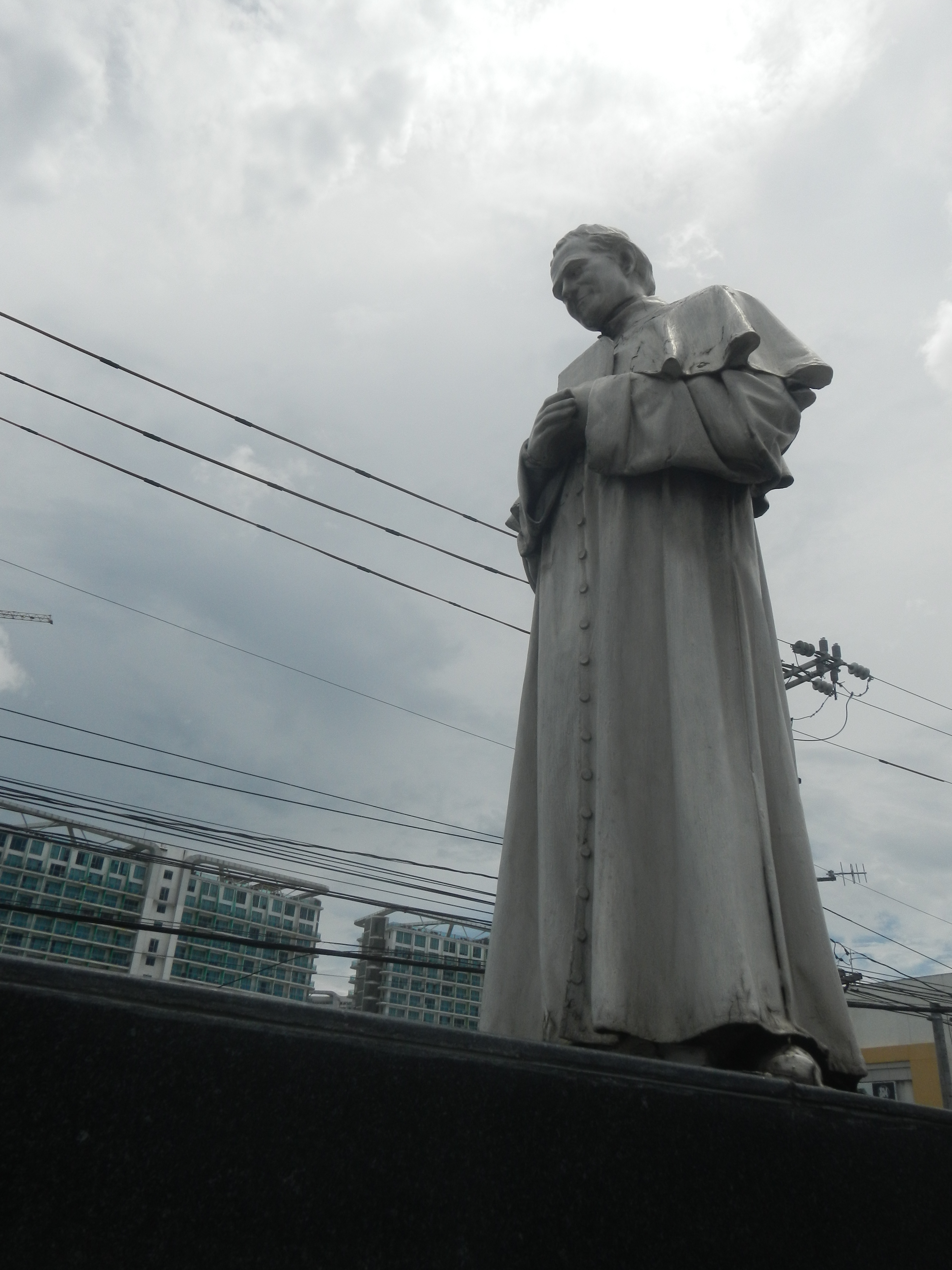
Statue of St. John Bosco, to whom the barangay is named for

On April 3, 1978, through Presidential Decree No. 1322 signed by President Ferdinand Marcos, Better Living Subdivision and its adjacent communities—Aero Park, Scienceville and Levitown—were separated from La Huerta to form a new separate barangay named for the titular patron saint of the formation house and shrine, Saint John Bosco.

=== Contemporary ===
SM City Bicutan

On December 10, 2011, a twin engine light aircraft crashed in a slum area in Don Bosco along the easement of Better Living Subdivision off Taiwan Street killing 11 people on the ground and damaging 50 shacks, as well as the adjacent F. Serrano Elementary School. In 2018, a total of 200 informal settler families were affected and 115 shacks were destroyed by fire in the same area in Don Bosco.

== Demographics ==
Year	Population
2007	42,338
2010	47,621
2015	52,297
2020	54,188
2024	56,113

== Education ==
Don Bosco is home to the provincial office and theological college of the Salesians of Don Bosco, the Don Bosco Center of Studies. It also hosts one of the largest concentrations of international schools in Metro Manila, with the European International School, the French School of Manila, the German European School Manila, Greatstart International School Manila and Southfields International Christian Academe Centrum, all located in Better Living Subdivision.

The barangay is also home to the following educational institutions:

- Academy of Mano Amiga
- Asian Institute of Computer Studies Bicutan Campus
- Books and Pens Tutorial and Learning Center
- Don Bosco High School
- Father Simpliciano Academy
- F. Serrano Elementary School
- Golden Achievers Academy Parañaque Campus
- Immaculate Heart of Mary College-Parañaque
- Kidsville Creative Systems
- Kinder Trail Learning Center
- Little Friends and Future Leaders Academy
- Mary Louis Montessori School
- Marymount Academy Better Living Campus (formerly Jesu Mariae International School)
- Paulo Scholastic Chastity de Montessori Academy
- Philippine Christian School of Tomorrow (formerly Manila Japanese School)
- St. Dominic Savio Learning Center
- St. Raymond's Nursery and Kindergarten School

== Transportation ==
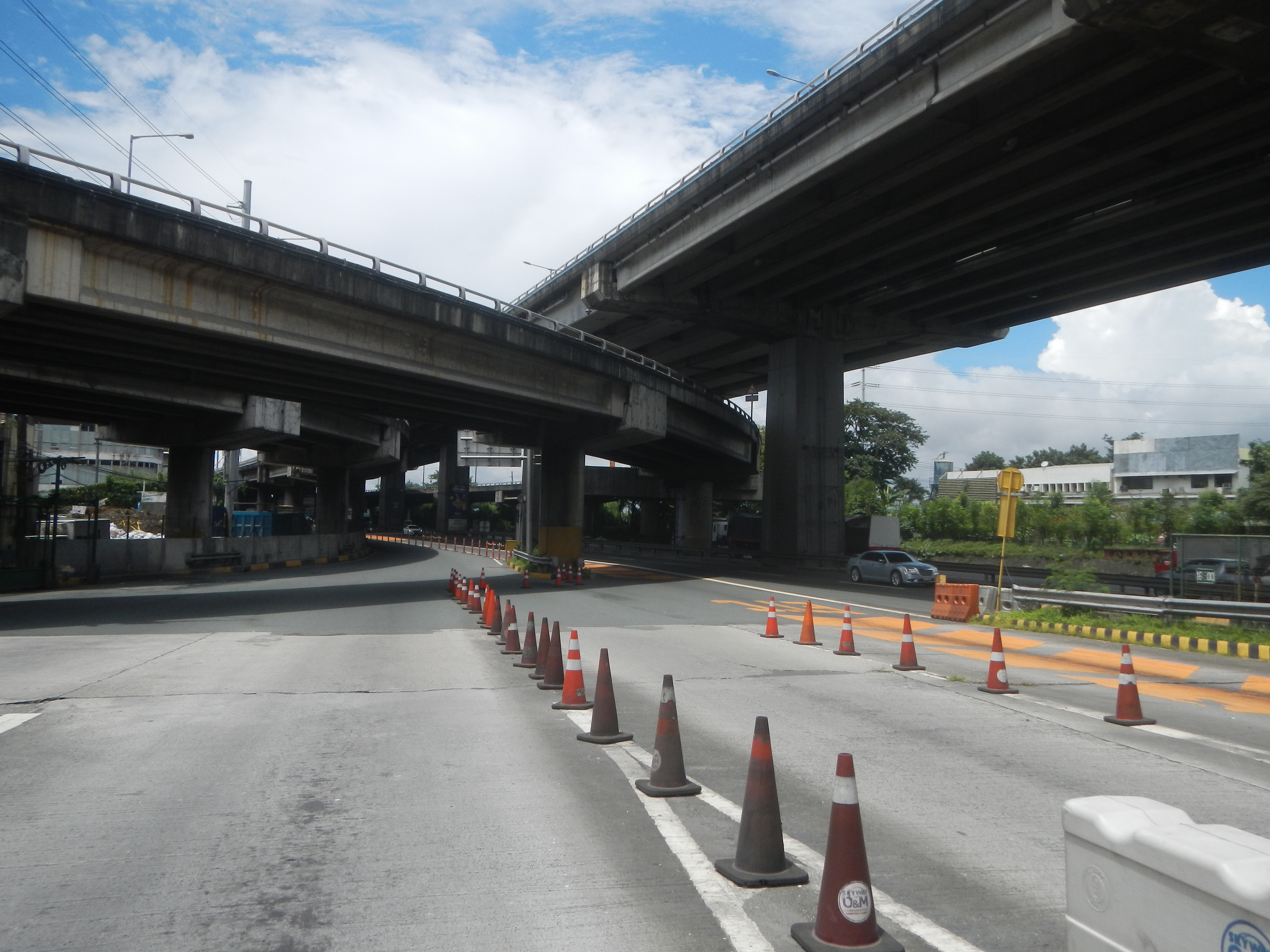
The Bicutan Interchange at the junction of Doña Soledad Avenue and South Luzon Expressway

Don Bosco is traversed by Doña Soledad Avenue which also provides access to surrounding communities of Sun Valley, Marcelo Green and Moonwalk at its west end. An extension in Moonwalk known as E. Rodriguez Street leads motorists to the C-5 Road Extension and eventually to Ninoy Aquino Avenue in Santo Niño via Multinational Avenue. South Luzon Expressway and the elevated Skyway serve as the village's eastern boundary. The main north–south thoroughfare of Don Bosco is France Street in Better Living Subdivision which leads to San Antonio in the south through a maze of narrow residential streets.

The barangay is accessible from the PNR Metro Commuter Line by tricycles from the Bicutan railway station across the expressway in San Martin de Porres. Tricycles also travel along the whole stretch of Doña Soledad Avenue and within each gated community within the barangay.
