= San Antonio, Parañaque =

Barangay in Parañaque, Metro Manila, Philippines

San Antonio
- Barangay
- San Antonio Avenue

- Location within Metro Manila
- Coordinates: 14°27′56″N 121°1′52″E
- Country: Philippines
- Region: Metro Manila
- City: Parañaque
- Congressional districts: Part of the 2nd district of Parañaque
- Established: April 3, 1978
- Named for: St. Anthony of Padua

Government
  - Barangay Chairman: Leopoldo C. Casale

Area
  - Total: 2.8719 km^{2} (1.1088 sq mi)

Population (2020)
  - Total: 70,134
  - Density: 24,421/km^{2} (63,249/sq mi)
- ZIP code: 1715/1707
- Area code: 2

San Antonio is a barangay in Parañaque, Metro Manila, Philippines. It is a collection of sixteen gated communities on the east side of Parañaque abutting the city of Muntinlupa and the informal settlements surrounding them. The barangay is a long strip along the north side of Dr. Santos Avenue stretching from South Luzon Expressway to just west of San Antonio Avenue by the Jaka Plaza commercial center. It is bordered by Marcelo Green to the north, the Muntinlupa barangay of Sucat across the expressway to the east, BF Homes Parañaque across Dr. Santos Avenue to the south, and San Isidro and Moonwalk to the west. It extends to the northwest along San Antonio Avenue and also shares a border with Don Bosco further north and northwest. The barangay is part of the Parañaque's 2nd congressional district.

San Antonio is the city's administrative center, being the location of Parañaque City Hall. It is the most populous of the four barangays in Metro Manila bearing the name San Antonio. In 2016, the barangay also recorded the highest number of informal settlers in Parañaque with 2,661 households illegally occupying properties in the barangay, and 607 households living in makeshift houses. As of the 2020 census, San Antonio had a population of 70,134.

== History ==
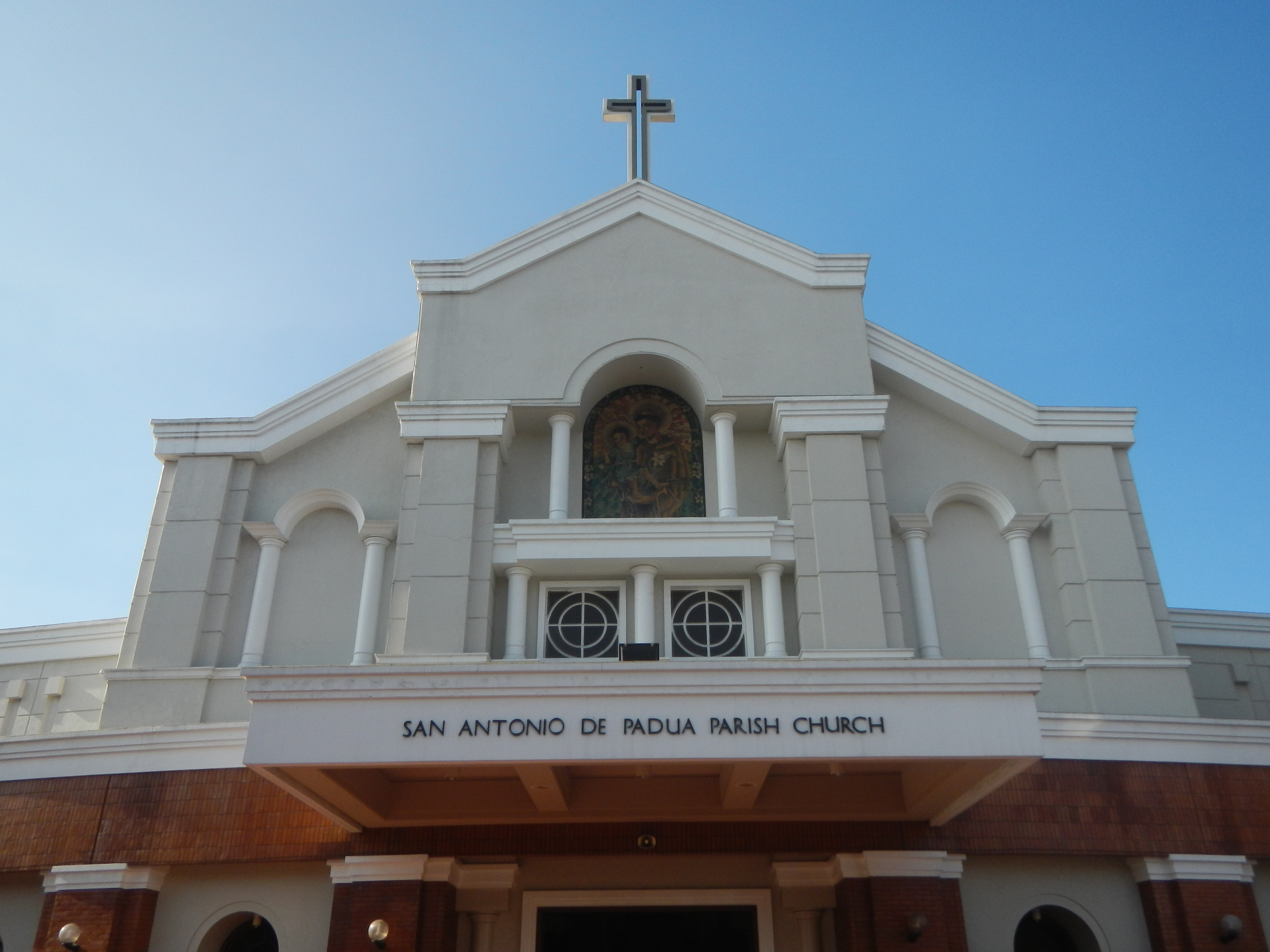
Parish church of San Antonio de Padua built in 1970

The territory that now forms barangay San Antonio is previously part of San Dionisio. In 1963, President Diosdado Macapagal and First Lady Eva Macapagal laid the cornerstone for the ₱1 million Parañaque Municipal Hall in San Antonio Valley during a ceremony hosted by Mayor Eleuterio de Leon. The building was completed in 1971 during the term of Mayor Florencio Bernabe Sr. and eventually replaced the old Casa Tribunal in La Huerta. In 1970, the Roman Catholic Archdiocese of Manila established the San Antonio de Padua Parish Church.

Barangay San Antonio was founded in 1978 as a result of real estate development and changing demographics happening across the Manila region in the decades following World War II. The multiplication of barangays was also aided by a national government program for economic acceleration through the creation of more administrative divisions during the term of President Ferdinand Marcos. The contiguous gated communities of San Antonio Valley (except Phases 2, 6, 12 and 15), Barangay Village, Fourth Estate, and Mon El Subdivision were separated from San Dionisio through Presidential Decree No. 1329. The new barangay was named after San Antonio Valley Phase 1, its largest component village where the San Antonio de Padua Parish Church is located, with Saint Anthony of Padua as its patron.

== Demographics ==
Year	Population
2007	55,719
2010	59,847
2015	67,401
2020	70,134
2024	73,832

== Education ==
Several educational institutions are located in San Antonio. They include:

- Agape Young Achievers' Christian Academy
- Fourth Estate Elementary School
- International Christian Academy
- LH Montessori High
- Parish Learning Center San Antonio de Padua
- San Antonio Elementary School
- San Antonio National High School
- United Christian Academy
- UP South School

== Transportation ==
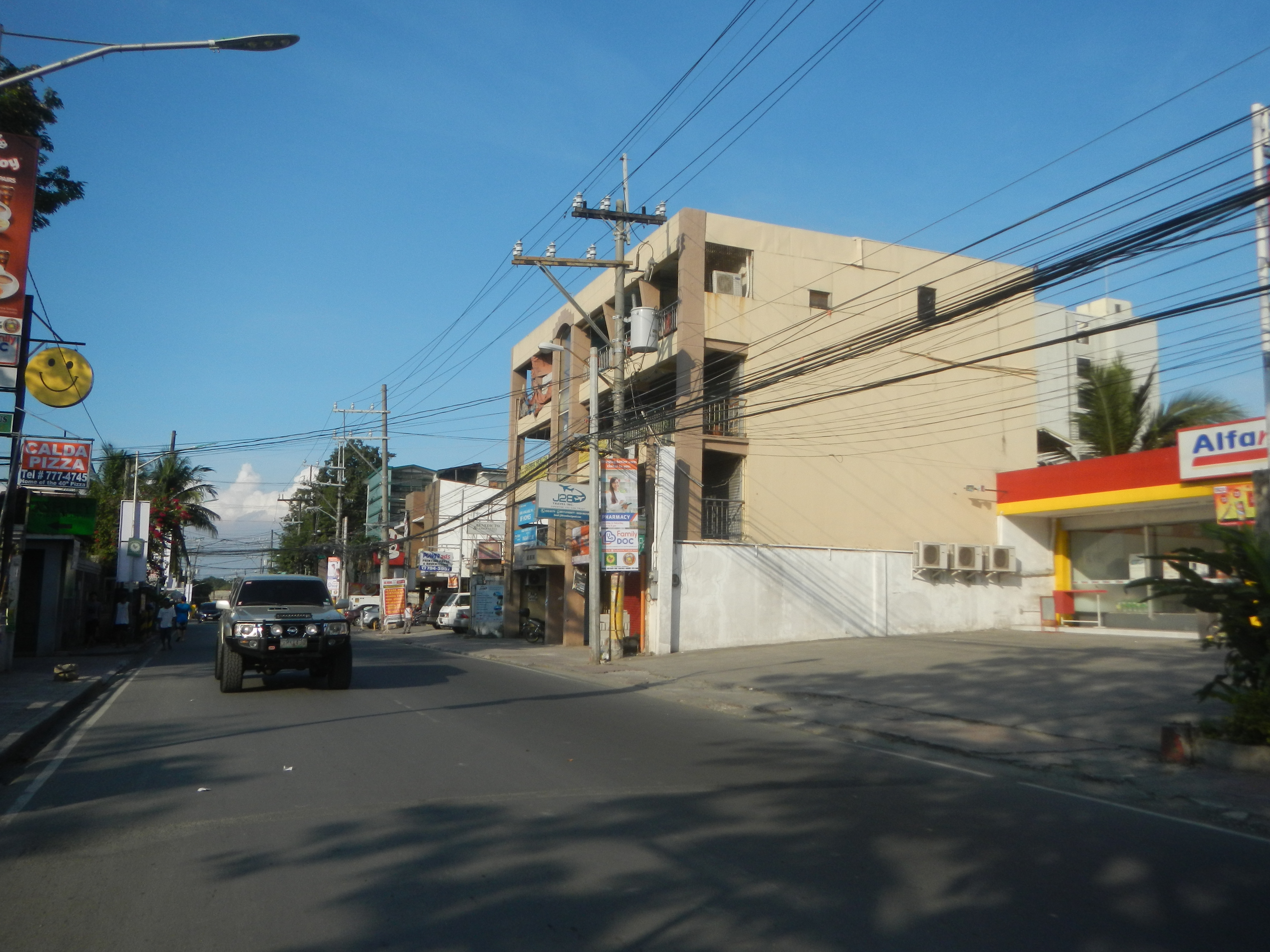
San Antonio Avenue in the vicinity of the Parañaque City Hall

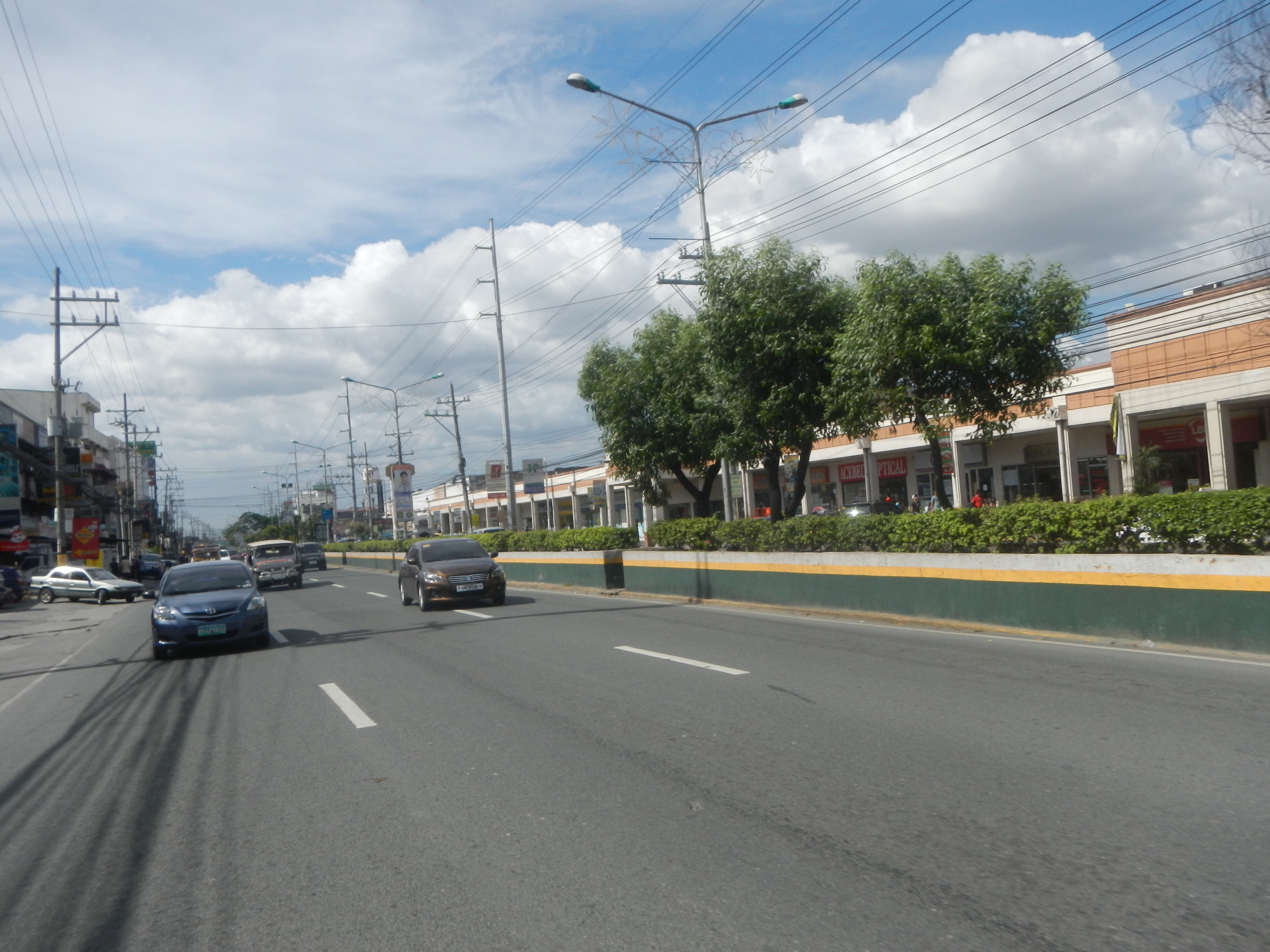
Jaka Plaza on Dr. Santos Avenue in San Antonio

San Antonio's road network consists of three national roads as of 2017. The South Luzon Expressway and elevated Skyway form the barangay's eastern boundary where the West Service Road, a national tertiary road, runs along a short 600-meter (2,000 ft) stretch of its territory giving access to a few industrial and logistics facilities. Dr. Santos Avenue is a national primary road which starts at the barangay's southeast corner and travels the whole 3-kilometer (1.9 mi) stretch of its boundary line with BF Homes. The San Antonio side of the avenue is lined with several retail stores including Jaka Plaza, Shopwise Sucat, the Santa Grove strip mall, and Amaia Steps, a condominium with a retail podium. It is also the main access road to the different gated communities as well as a few slum areas in between those communities. The Elorde Sports Center, a popular boxing venue and the oldest in the chain of boxing gyms in the country owned by the family of Gabriel Elorde, has stood on the 3-hectare (7.4-acre) site across from the Manila Memorial Park and adjacent to Fourth Estate Subdivision on Dr. Santos Avenue since 1974.

San Antonio Avenue is the main north–south thoroughfare of the barangay situated on the western side by the Jaka Plaza. This local road not only provides access to the Parañaque City Hall, the San Antonio de Padua Parish Church and San Antonio Valley Wet Market, it also serves to connect the communities of San Antonio and Don Bosco and as an alternate route between Dr. Santos Avenue and Doña Soledad Avenue, through a maze of narrow residential streets in San Antonio Valley and Better Living Subdivision.

Public transportation in San Antonio consists primarily of jeepneys and UV Express along Dr. Santos Avenue and West Service Road, and city buses along South Luzon Expressway. The barangay is also served by the Sucat railway station in the adjacent barangay Sucat. Tricycles are the main mode of transportation in the gated barangays and inner streets like San Antonio Avenue in San Antonio Valley, which is typical of barangays in Metro Manila.
