= List of schools in Parañaque =

The City of Parañaque in the Philippines has a diverse educational system with specializations in various academic and technical fields and is home to many schools and colleges.

== Universities and Colleges ==
- AMA Computer University - Dr. A. Santos Avenue, San Isidro
- Asian Institute of Computer Studies (AICS), Bicutan Branch - 1571 Triangle Bldg., Doña Soledad Avenue, Better Living Subdivision, Don Bosco
- College of Divine Wisdom, Parañaque - AMVEl Business Park, Brgy. San Dionisio, Sucat
- Datamex Institute of Computer Technology College of Saint Adeline - Dr. A. Santos Avenue, Sucat
- Don Bosco School of Theology - Michael Rua Street corner Israel Street, Better Living Subdivision, Don Bosco
- GoTec International Business School - Block 5, Lot 9, Saint Paul Street, Lopez Village
- Immaculate Heart of Mary College Parañaque - St. Dominic Savio Street, Better Living Subdivision, Don Bosco
- Informatics Computer College - Brgy. Don Bosco Tricycle Terminal Bldg., Better Living Subd., West Bicutan
- InfoTech College of Art - Dr. A. Santos Avenue, San Dionisio
- Flight School International - Dr. A. Santos Avenue, Sucat
- Olivarez College - Dr. A. Santos Avenue, Sucat
- Parañaque City College - Corner Coastal Road, Victor Medina Street, Brgy. San Dionisio
- PATTS College of Aeronautics - Lombos Avenue, San Isidro
- Polytechnic University of the Philippines, Parañaque - Brgy. Sto. Niño
- Premiere Computer Learning Center - Dr. A. Santos Avenue, San Dionisio
- St. Augustine School of Nursing - Dr. A. Santos Avenue, San Dionisio
- Polytechnic University of the Philippines, Parañaque - Col. E. de Leon Street, Brgy. Sto. Niño
- STI College - Dr. A. Santos Avenue corner Palanyag Road, Sucat
- Universal Colleges of Parañaque, Inc. - Dr. A. Santos Avenue, Sucat

== Public Secondary ==
- Baclaran National High School - Bagong Buhay Street, Brgy. Baclaran
- Don Bosco National High School - El Dorado Dulo, Better Living Subdivision, Brgy. Don Bosco
- Dr. Arcadio Santos National High School - Kilometer 15, East Service Road, South Superhighway, Brgy. San Martin de Porres
- La Huerta National High School - Marcelo H. del Pilar Street, Brgy. La Huerta
- Marcelo Green High School - 37 Dama De Noche, Ups IV, Brgy. Marcelo Green Paranaque City
- Masville National High School - Masville, Brgy. BF Homes
- Moonwalk National High School - St. Mary's Daang Batang Street, San Agustin Village, Brgy. Moonwalk
- Parañaque National High School (Main) - Dr. A. Santos Avenue corner Kay Talise Street, Brgy. San Dionisio
- Parañaque National High School (Baclaran Annex) - Pinaglabanan Street, Brgy. Baclaran
- Parañaque National High School (Don Galo Annex) - Santa Monica Street, Brgy. Don Galo
- Parañaque National High School (San Isidro Annex) - United Parañaque Subdivision V, Brgy. San Isidro
- Parañaque National High School (Tambo Annex) - NAIA road, Brgy. Tambo
- Parañaque Science High School - Col. E. de Leon Street, Brgy. Sto. Niño
- San Antonio High School Parañaque - Hontiveros Cmpd., Fourth Estate Subdivision, Brgy. San Antonio
- Sun Valley National High School - Elizabeth Avenue, Sapang Maligaya, Brgy. Sun Valley
- Sto. Niño National High School - Col. E. de Leon Street, Brgy. Sto. Niño

== Private Secondary ==
- Agape Young Achievers Christian Academy, Inc. (A.Y.A.C.A.I.) - 4 and 5 Paglinawan St., Sunrise Drive, Fourth Estate Subdivision, Brgy. San Antonio, Sucat
- Ann Arbor Montessori Learning Center, Inc. - El Grande Avenue, BF Homes
- Arandia College - Block 1, Lot 1, Valarao Street, Airport Village Moonwalk
- Blessed Adelheid Academy, Inc. - 6283 Daang Batang St. Moonwalk
- Christian Faith Academy of Better Living, Inc. - Peru St., Better Living
- Christian Harvest Academy Foundation, Inc. - Bougainville Road, Sun Valley Subdivision, Sun Valley
- Create and Learning Paths School - 29 Calcutta St., Merville Park
- Datamex College Of St Adeline - 8167 Dr. A Santos Ave., Sucat
- Davidville Academy, Inc. - St. Paul Street, Lopez Village, Sucat
- En Fuego Christian Academy, Inc. - A. Aguirre Avenue, BF Homes
- Escuela de San Dionisio - Quirino Avenue, San Dionisio
- Escuela de San Lorenzo Ruiz - Sanchez Avenue, Greenheights Subdivision, Sucat
- Father Simpliciano Academy - Malacañang Drive, Better Living Subd.
- God's Heritage Christian Academy - Quirino Avenue, Don Galo
- Golden Achiever's Academy of Parañaque (formerly Hansel and Gretel Academy) - Andrew corner Apallos Streets, Better Living Subdivision, Don Bosco
- Golden Values School - V. Buencamino Street, Sinagtala Village, BF Homes
- Good Christian of Faith Academy - Sun Valley Drive, Sun Valley Subdivision, Sun Valley
- Great Christian Academy Foundation, Inc. - Sun Valley Drive, Sun Valley Subdivision, Sun Valley
- Holy Francis School of Parañaque, Inc. - Franciscan Servites, Multinational Avenue, Multinational Village, Moonwalk
- Immaculate Heart of Mary College-Parañaque - St. Dominic Savio Street, Better Living Subdivision, Don Bosco
- International Christian Academy - Lot 4505 Extra Street, Fourth Estate Subdivision, San Antonio
- Katrina Solano Institute of Learning, Inc. - J. Elizalde St., BF Homes
- Kids Choice Learning Academy, Inc. (Kids Choice Learning Center) - E. Aguinaldo Street, Malacañang Village, San Antonio
- Legacy Christian Academy, Inc. - Block 2, Lot 30, Don Pedro Southwind Estate, Sucat
- Lighthouse Bible Believer's Christian Academy - Justice Hugo Street, Sector 10, BF Homes
- LH Montessori High, Inc. - 39 Press Drive, Fourth Estate Subdivision, San Antonio
- Lifeline Foundation South City Central School (LF-SCCS) - 86 Aguirre Ave., BF Homes
- Le-sil Montessori School - Dr. Arcadio Santos Avenue, San Isidro
- Mace Learning Center - El Grande Ave., BF Homes
- Manresa School - Candida Maria Street, BF Homes
- Mace Learning Center - El Grande Ave., BF Homes
- Madre Maria Pia Notari School, Inc. - Simon St. Multinational Village
- Maria Montessori Children's School Foundation, Inc.- Off Madrid St., E. Nery Street, Merville Park Subdivision, Paranaque City (Entrance via Merville Park Gate 1), 1709 Metro Manila, Philippines
- Mary Immaculate School, Inc. - Sta. Natividad Street, San Antonio Valley, San Isidro
- Marymount School - J. Villaroman Street, Classic Homes Village, BF Homes
- Marymount Academy Better Living - Mary Help Of Christians St., Brgy. Don Bosco, Parañaque
- Marymount Academy San Antonio - San Antonio Valley 1, Sucat
- Montessori de Manila - Pablo Roman Street, BF Homes Executive Village, BF Homes
- Neo BrightSide Christian Academy - Aguirre Ave., BF Homes
- Olivarez College - Dr. A. Santos Avenue, Sucat
- Our Lady of Carmel Educational Center, Inc. - Ramona Tirona Street, Phase I, BF Homes
- Paulo Scholastic Chastity de Montessori Academy, Inc. - Block 6, Lot 33 and 34, Japan corner Jamaica Streets, Better Living Subdivision, Don Bosco
- Periwinkle Hillcrest School, Inc. - Cecillia Curve, Don Jose Green Court, Sucat
- Philippians Academy of Paranaque Inc. - 1314 Borman, Parañaque, 1709 Metro Manila
- Philippine Christian School of Tomorrow - MJS Avenue, Levitown Executive Village, Don Bosco
- Ramon Pascual Institute - Dr. A. Santos Avenue, Sucat
- Regina Maria Montessori - Mendoza Street, Villa Mendoza Subdivision, Sucat
- Regis Grace Montessori School - Daang Hari Street, Marian Lakeview Park, San Martin de Porres
- Rogationist College of Parañaque - San Dionisio, Sucat
- Sacred Heart School - Madre Isabella de Rosis Street, Multinational Village, Moonwalk
- Seed Cosmic Academy, Inc. - West Service Road, Sun Valley
- Shekinah Christian Training Center - Kirishima Street, BF Homes
- Southfields International Christian Academe Centrum (SICAC) - Amity Ext., Better Living, Brgy. Don Bosco Paranaque
- St. Andrew's School - Quirino Avenue, La Huerta
- St. Cyr Academy - Dr. A. Santos Avenue, Sucat
- St. Francis Academy - Dr. A. Santos Avenue, Sucat
- St. John Paul II Academy of Parañaque - Gladiola Street, Marimar Village II, Bicutan
- St. Paul College of Parañaque - Quirino Avenue, La Huerta
- Sucat Evangelical Christian Academy - San Antonio Avenue, San Antonio Valley, San Isidro
- Sun Valley Montessori Foundation, Inc. - Benedictine Street, Sta. Ana Village, Sun Valley
- The Master's Academy Foundation, Inc. - Kilometer 16, West Service Road, Bicutan
- United Christian Academy, Inc. - Highlight Street, Area 4, Fourth Estate Subdivision, San Antonio
- UPSouth Education Foundation, Inc. - Sunrise Drive, Fourth Estate, Brgy. San Antonio, Paranaque
- Veritas Parochial School - Gil Puyat Street, Phase I, BF Homes
- Ville Saint John Academy - Maharlika Avenue, Phase V, Marcelo Green Village, Marcelo Green

== Public Elementary ==
- Baclaran Elementary School Central - Pinaglabanan Street, Baclaran
- Baclaran Elementary School Unit I - Pinaglabanan Street, Baclaran
- Baclaran Elementary School Unit II - Santiago Street, Baclaran
- Camp Claudio Elementary School - C. Santos Street
- Col. E. de Leon Elementary School - Purok 7, Moonwalk
- Don Galo Elementary School - J. Gabriel Street, Don Galo
- F. Serrano, Sr. Elementary School - John Street, Don Bosco
- Fourth Estate Elementary School (Parañaque Elementary School Unit III) - Fame Street, Fourth Estate Subdivision, San Antonio
- La Huerta Elementary School - Ninoy Aquino Avenue, La Huerta
- Marcelo Green Elementary School - 37 Dama De Noche, Ups IV, Brgy. Marcelo Green Paranaque City
- Moonwalk Elementary School
- Masville Elementary School - Masville Avenue, BF Homes
- Parañaque Central Elementary School - Kabihasnan Street, San Dionisio
- Parañaque Elementary School Unit II - Kabihasnan Street, San Dionisio
- Parañaque Elementary School Unit III - Silverio Compound, San Isidro
- Rogelio G. Gatchalian Elementary School - Don Juan Street, Vitalez
- Sampaloc Site II Elementary School - Guyabano Street, Sampaloc Site II BF Homes
- San Agustin Elementary School - E. Rodriguez Avenue, San Agustin Village, Moonwalk
- San Antonio Elementary School (Parañaque Elementary School Unit IV) - Santa Lucia Street, San Antonio
- San Antonio Elementary School - Silverio Annex - Silverio Compound, Brgy. San Isidro
- San Isidro Elementary School - UPS V, Brgy. San Isidro
- San Dionisio Elementary School (Parañaque Elementary School Unit I) - Kabihasnan Street, San Dionisio
- Sto. Niño Elementary School - J.P. Rizal Street, Sto. Niño
- Sun Valley Elementary School - Elizabeth Avenue, Sun Valley
- Tambo Elementary School Main - NAIA Road, Tambo
- Tambo Elementary School Unit I - C. Santos Street, Tambo

== Private Elementary ==
- Abenton Learning Center Philippines, Moonwalk
- Ann Arbor Montessori Learning Center, Inc. - El Grande Avenue, BF Homes
- Arandia College - Block 1, Lot 1, F. Valarao Street, Airport Village, Brgy. Moonwalk
- Beginners Mind Montessori House Kindergarten School - Jerusalem St., Multinational Village, Brgy. Moonwalk
- Blessed Adelheid Academy, Inc. - No. 6283 Daang Batang St. Brgy. Moonwalk
- Blessed Luisa School, Inc. - San Gabriel Street, San Antonio Valley, San Isidro
- Blessed Margaret Educational Center, Inc. - J. Elizalde Street, BF Homes
- Brainshire Science School - J. Gabriel Street, Baclaran
- Bridge School - 29 Cairo Street, BF Northwest Parañaque
- Center of Hope for Integrated Learning and Development - T. Teodoro Street, Sinagtala Village, BF Homes
- Children of Light Foundation, Inc. - 4455 Bernardo Square, Annex 29-32, Better Living Subdivision, Don Bosco
- Christ Child School - Salvador Street, San Dionisio
- CSA Learning Center - San Roque Street, San Agustin Valley
- Create and Learning Paths School - 29 Calcutta St., Merville Park
- Creative Minds Learning and Therapy Center - 443 El Grande Avenue, BF Homes
- Christian Faith Academy of Better Living, Inc. - Peru St., Better Living
- Datamex College Of St Adeline - 8167 Dr. A Santos Ave., Sucat
- Davidville Academy, Inc. - St. Paul Street, Lopez Village
- En Fuego Christian Academy, Inc. - A. Aguirre Avenue, BF Homes
- Escuela de San Dionisio - Quirino Avenue, San Dionisio
- Escuela de San Lorenzo Ruiz - Sanchez Avenue, Greenheights Subdivision, Sucat
- Father Simpliciano Academy - Malacañang Drive, Better Living Subdivision, Don Bosco
- Francis Possenti Tutorial and Learning Center - Sun Valley Drive, Sun Valley Subdivision, Sun Valley
- Gemille School, Inc. - St. Jude corner St. Andrew Streets, Lopez Village, Sucat
- Genesis Learning Academy - Evacom, Sucat
- Gift of Advanced Learning (GOAL) Montessori School - Lavender Street, Sun Valley Subdivision, Sun Valley
- Golden Achievers' Academy of Parañaque (formerly Hansel and Gretel Academy) - Andrew corner Apallos Streets, Better Living Subdivision, Don Bosco
- Golden Values School - V. Buencamino Street, Sinagtala Village, BF Homes
- Grace Special School, Inc. - Stanfford Street, Moonwalk
- Great Christian Academy Foundation, Inc. - Sun Valley Drive, Sun Valley Subdivision, Sun Valley
- Greatstart International School Manila - 187 Dona Soledad Ave Ext., Better Living Subdivision, Don Bosco
- Holy Child Angels Learning Center of Parañaque - Sampaguita Street, Matatdo Homes, Sucat
- Holy Francis School of Parañaque, Inc. - Franciscan Servites, Multinational Avenue, Multinational Village, Moonwalk
- Holy Mary of Guadalupe Development School - Sun Valley Dr. Sun Valley
- Immaculate Heart of Mary College-Parañaque - St. Dominic Savio Street, Better Living Subdivision, Don Bosco
- John Shannon Montessori - President Quezon Street, Teoville Subdivision, BF Homes
- Katrina Solano Institute of Learning, Inc. - J. Elizalde St., BF Homes
- Kids Choice Montessori Academy, Inc. (Kids Choice Learning Center) - E. Aguinaldo Street, Malacañang Village, San Antonio
- Kidsville Creative Systems, Inc. - Canada corner Ceylon Streets, Better Living Subdivision, Don Bosco
- Kinder Care Learning Center, Inc. - Concha Cruz Drive, BF Homes
- Kinder Trail Learning Center - 47 Ghana St. Section IV, Better Living Subdivision
- Learn and Play Montessori - Marcelo Avenue, Phase 3, Marcelo Green Village, Marcelo Green
- Learning Garden Montessori School - Aguirre Avenue, BF Homes
- Legacy Christian Academy, Inc. - Block 2, Lot 30, Don Pedro Southwind Estate, Sucat
- L'Enfant Scuola (The Child's School) - Dama de Noche Street, Tahanan Village, BF Homes
- Le-Sil Montessori School - Creek Drive, Dr. A. Santos Avenue, Sucat
- LH Montessori High, Inc. - 39 Press Drive, Fourth Estate Subdivision, Brgy. San Antonio
- Lifeline Foundation South City Central School (LF-SCCS) - 86 Aguirre Ave., BF Homes
- Lighthouse Bible Believer's Christian Academy - Justice Hugo Street, Sector 10, BF Homes
- Mace Learning Center - El Grande Ave., BF Homes
- Madre Maria Pia Notari School, Inc. - #70 Timothy / Simon Street, Multinational Village, Moonwalk
- Mano Amiga Academy - L3B Levitown Avenue, Brgy. Don Bosco, Betterliving Subdivision, Paranaque City
- Manresa School - Candida Maria Street, BF Homes
- Maria Montessori Children's School Foundation, Inc.- Off Madrid St., E. Nery Street, Merville Park Subdivision, Paranaque City (Entrance via Merville Park Gate 1), 1709 Metro Manila, Philippines
- Martyr's Ecumenical School - Quirino Avenue, Tambo
- Mary Heights Learning Center, Inc. - Severina Avenue, Kilometer 18, Marcelo Green
- Mary Immaculate School, Inc. - Sta. Natividad Street, San Antonio Valley, San Isidro
- Mary Louis Montessori School, Inc. - El Dorado Avenue, Levitown Executive Village, Don Bosco
- Marymount School - J. Villaroman Street, Classic Homes Village, BF Homes
- Marymount Academy Better Living - Mary Help Of Christians St., Brgy. Don Bosco, Parañaque
- Merville Sacred Heart School - Vienna Street, Merville
- Mon-El Learning Center - Mangga Street, Mon-El Subdivision, Sucat
- Montessori de Manila - Pablo Roman Street, BF Homes Executive Village, BF Homes
- Mother of Divine Grace School of Parañaque, Inc. - A. Pissionist Street, Santa Ana Village
- Mother Maria Maddalena Starace School Incorporated - 42 Russia Street, Don Bosco, Better Living Subdivision, 1711 Paranaque City, Metro Manila
- Olivarez College - Dr. A. Santos Avenue, Sucat
- Nativity House of Learning - 533 Quirino Avenue corner Librada Avelino Street, Brgy. Tambo
- Neo BrightSide Christian Academy - Aguirre Ave., BF Homes
- Our Lady of Carmel Educational Center, Inc. - Ramona Tirona Street, Phase I, BF Homes
- Our Lady of Carmel School - Sta. Rita Parish Compound, Quirino Avenue, Baclaran
- Our Lady of Unity Parochial School - 11th Street, United Parañaque Subdivision, San Martin de Porres
- Palm Crest School - Palm Spring Street, Merville
- Parañaque Risen Christ School - St. Francis Street, San Agustin Village, Moonwalk
- Parish Learning Center of San Antonio de Padua, Inc. - San Antonio de Padua Parish, San Antonio Village, Sucat
- Paulo Scholastic Chastity de Montessori Academy, Inc. - Block 6, Lot 33 and 34, Japan corner Jamaica Streets, Better Living Subdivision, Don Bosco
- Pean Integrated School of Parañaque, Inc. - 235 Aldrin Street, Moonwalk Village
- Philippians Academy of Paranaque Inc. - 1314 Borman, Parañaque, 1709 Metro Manila
- Philippine Christian School of Tomorrow - MJS Avenue, Levitown Executive Village, Don Bosco
- Regina Maria Montessori - Mendoza Street, Villa Mendoza Subdivision, Sucat
- Richfield Child Development Center, Inc. - #149 Multinational Avenue, Multinational Village
- Rogationist College of Parañaque - San Dionisio, Sucat
- Sacred Heart School - Madre Isabella de Rosis Street, Multinational Village, Moonwalk
- Scuola Figlie de Maria Immaculata, Inc. - Doña Irenea Street, Ireneville Subdivision I, BF Homes
- Shekinah Christian Training Center - Kirishima Street, BF Homes
- South Merville School - Montclair Street, Merville Park, Merville
- Southfields International Christian Academe Centrum (SICAC) - Amity Ext., Better Living, Brgy. Don Bosco Paranaque
- St. Agatha Academy, Inc. - Dr. A. Santos Avenue, Sucat
- St. Andrew's School - Quirino Avenue, La Huerta
- St. Cyr Academy - Dr. A. Santos Avenue, Sucat
- St. Dionysus School, Inc. - Irasan Street, San Dionisio
- St. Dominic Savio Learning Center, Inc. - Magnolia Street, Camella Classic Homes, Don Bosco
- St. Francis Academy - Dr. A. Santos Avenue, Sucat
- St. Gabriel Academy of Parañaque - Quirino Avenue, Baclaran
- St. John Paul II Academy of Parañaque - Gladiola Street, Marimar Village II, Bicutan
- St. Jude Educational Play and Tutorial Center - Ramona Tirona Street, BF Homes
- St. Leonard Academy of Parañaque, Inc. - Immaculate Street, Remmaville Subdivision, Sucat
- St. Martin de Porres Kindergarten School - Narra Street, United Parañaque Subdivision, San Martin de Porres
- St. Paul College of Parañaque - Quirino Avenue, La Huerta
- St. Raymond's Nursery and Kindergarten School - Saudi Arabia Street, Better Living Subdivision, Don Bosco
- St. Theresa de Avila School of Parañaque - Dr. A. Santos Avenue, Sucat
- Sun Valley Montessori Foundation, Inc. - Benedictine Street, Sta. Ana Village, Sun Valley
- The Center of Creative Concepts for Children - Mangga Street, Marcelo Green Village, Marcelo Green
- United Christian Academy, Inc. - Highlight Street, Area 4, Fourth Estate Subdivision, San Antonio
- Upsouth Education Foundation, Inc. (Fourth Estate Branch) - Sunrise Drive, Fourth Estate, Brgy. San Antonio
- Veritas Parochial School - Gil Puyat Street, Phase I, BF Homes
- Ville Saint John Academy - Maharlika Avenue, Phase V, Marcelo Green Village, Marcelo Green F.
- World of Wonder Preschool - Russia Street, Better Living Subdivision, Brgy. Don Bosco

== Private Preschool ==
- Golden Values School, Inc. - 24 Canberra St. BF Homes BF Northwest, Paranaque City
- Upsouth Education Foundation, Inc. - Sunrise Drive, Fourth Estate, Paranaque City

== International schools ==
- Academy of Mano Amiga (Mano Amiga Academy)
- Australia International School Manila - Dr. A. Santos Ave., Brgy. BF Homes, Sucat
- European International School (Deutsche Europäische Schule Manila; Lycée Français de Manille)
- Greatstart International School Manila - 187 Dona Soledad Ave Ext., Better Living Subdivision, Don Bosco
- The King's School, Manila - Aseana City
- Singapore School Manila - Aseana City

== Former schools ==
- Agape Young Achievers Christian Academy, Inc. (A.Y.A.C.A.I.) - 4 and 5 Paglinawan St., Area 4 Compound, Sunrise Drive, Fourth Estate, Brgy. San Antonio. (due to pandemic)
- Betty's Vermillion Academy, Sucat Campus - 10th Street, United Parañaque Subdivision No. 5 (inactive, lack of enrollees due to pandemic; still operates at their other campuses in Pasay City and Makati City.)
- Centro Escolar University Parañaque - Librada Avelino St. Tambo
- Christian Harvest Academy (moved to ARCA South Complex Taguig; now closed in 2022)
- Euro Campus International School - Levitown Subd., Brgy. Don Bosco, Parañaque City (now currently replaced by Philippine Christian School Of Tomorrow from Alabang, Muntinlupa City)
- Informatics College Bicutan - SM City Bicutan Annex Bldg., Better Living Subdivision, Brgy. Don Bosco, Paranaque City
- Jesu Mariae International School "Formerly Jesu Mariae School & Preschool Learning Center Makati" (now currently occupied and replaced by Marymount Academy Better Living)
- Jose Maria Escriva Academy, Fourth Estate Subdivision (due to lack of business permit)
- Languages International Culture Academy (BRYN LICA) (moved to Las Piñas)
- Little Friends Academy, Inc. - Venice Street, Better Living Subdivision, Don Bosco
- Lycée D'Regis Marie School - Dr. A. Santos Avenue, Sucat (due to land title conflict)
- Parañaque City College of Science and Technology - Kabihasnan Street, San Dionisio
- South Merville School - Montclair Street, Merville Park, Merville
- STI Academy of Parañaque
- St. James College of Parañaque (moved to Quezon City)
- St. Rita College Parañaque City (now currently occupied and replaced by APEC Schools Philippines)
- The Learning Child School (moved to Ayala Alabang)

The Japanese School of Manila moved to Parañaque in 1978, and then to Taguig in 2001. When it was in Parañaque, it was in Barangay Don Bosco, Levitown Subdivision.

== See also ==
- List of schools in Metro Manila (primary and secondary)
- List of international schools in Metro Manila
- List of universities and colleges in Metro Manila
