= List of international schools in Metro Manila =

The following is a list of international schools located only inside the Metro Manila region, and the international curricula offered, including local schools which offer a foreign education system.

== List of schools ==
=== Las Piñas ===
- Southville International School affiliated with Foreign Universities (SISFU)
- Southville International School and Colleges
- South SEED LPDH College

=== Makati ===
- CIE British School (Centre for International Education)
- Reach International School
- YouBetter International School

=== Mandaluyong ===
- Keys School Manila

=== Manila ===
- Aguinaldo International School Manila
- Saint Jude Catholic School

=== Muntinlupa ===
- MIT International School
- South Mansfield College

=== Parañaque ===
- Australian International School Manila
- European International School Manila
  - German European School Manila PYP, DSD
  - Lycée Français de Manille
- Nord Anglia International School Manila
- Singapore School Manila

=== Pasay ===
- Mahatma Gandhi International School, Pasay
- Global Leaders International School, Aseana Campus

=== Pasig ===
- Domuschola International School
- Life Academy International
- Reedley International School Manila
- Saint Gabriel International School
- Victory Christian International School

=== Quezon City ===
- Britesparks International School
- Jubilee Christian Academy
- Multiple Intelligence International School
- Remnant International Christian School
- Our Lady of Victories Catholic School

=== San Juan ===
- Fountain International School
- Immaculate Conception Academy-Greenhills
- Xavier School

=== Taguig ===
- The Beacon School
- British School Manila
- Chinese International School Manila
- Everest Academy Manila
- Global Leaders International School</ref name="www.GLIS.edu.ph"/>
- International School Manila – Presidential Decree No. 732, s. 1975
- Korean International School Philippines
- Leaders International Christian School of Manila
- Manila Japanese School

== See also ==
- List of schools in Metro Manila (primary and secondary)
- List of universities and colleges in Metro Manila
