= Manresa =

- Municipality
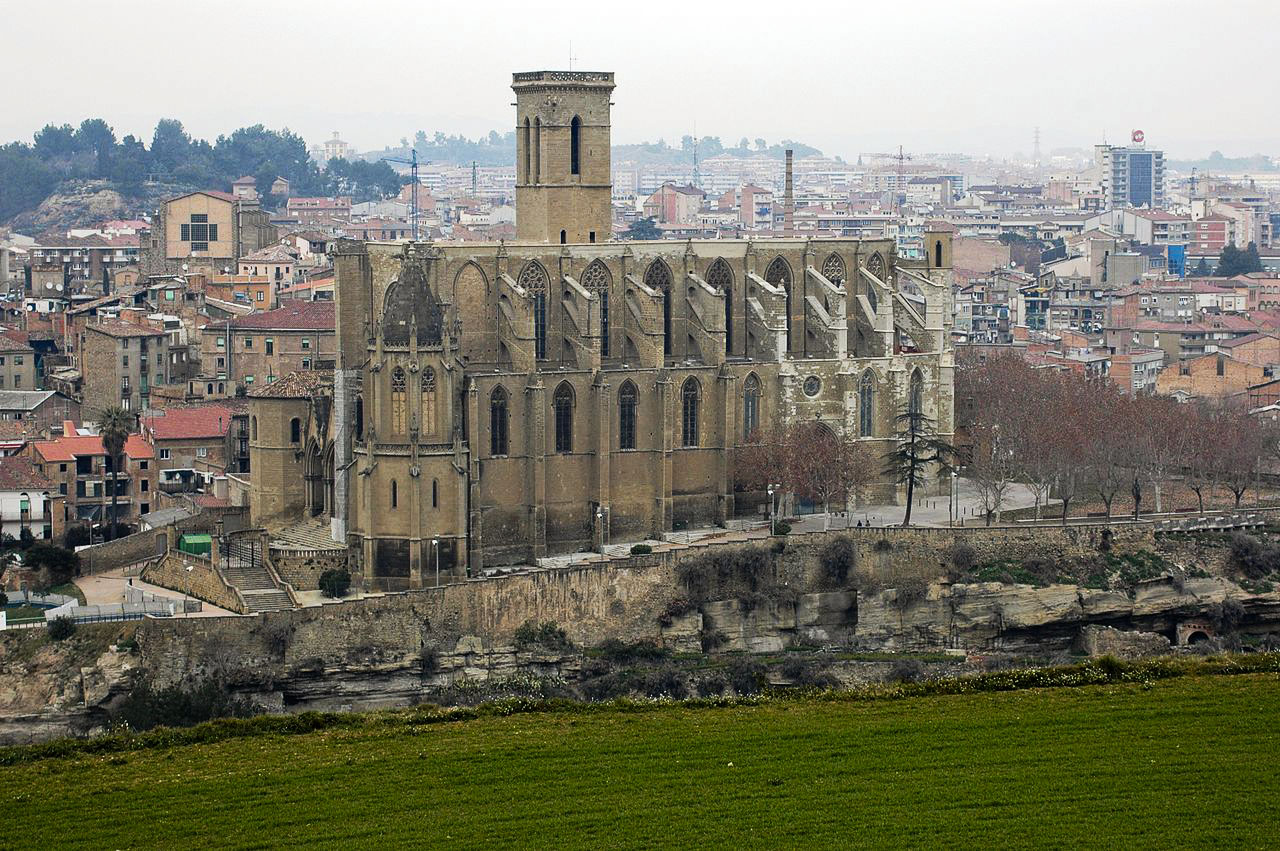
- Seu of Manresa

- Flag Coat of arms

- Location in Bages county
- Interactive map of Manresa
- Location within Catalonia Location within Spain
- Coordinates: 41°43′46″N 1°49′38″E
- Sovereign state: Spain
- Community: Catalonia
- Region: Centre
- County: Bages
- Province: Barcelona

Government
  - Mayor: Marc Aloy Guàrdia (2020) (ERC)

Area
  - Total: 41.6 km^{2} (16.1 sq mi)
- Elevation: 238 m (781 ft)

Population (2025-01-01)
  - Total: 80,974
  - Density: 1,950/km^{2} (5,040/sq mi)
- Demonym(s): manresà, -sana
- Postal code: 08241-08243
- Climate: Cfa
- Website: manresa.cat

Manresa (Catalan pronunciation: [mənˈrɛzə]) is the capital of Bages county, located in the central region of Catalonia.

Crossed by the river Cardener, it is located in an industrial area with textile, metallurgical, and glass industries. The houses of Manresa are arranged around the basilica of Santa Maria de la Seu. Ignatius of Loyola stopped to pray in the town on his way back from Montserrat in 1522. He also read in solitude in a cave near the town for a year, which contributed to the formulation of his Spiritual Exercises. The town is a place of pilgrimage for Catholics.

It is believed the comarcal name "Bages" comes from a corruption of the Latin "Bacchus" due to the extensive production of wine in the area. The wine was produced from grapes grown mainly in terraced vineyards, and a number of these old terraces can be seen today. Wine ceased to be the main product of the area as a consequence of phylloxera, but is still an important part of the Manresa/Bages economy.

During the Napoleonic invasion, the volunteer troops of Manresa (sometent in the Catalan language) defeated the French troops in the El Bruc Pass in June 1808, but the retreating French burned and demolished much of the town. After the expulsion of Napoleon's troops, Manresans rebuilt the town using the rubble.

== History ==
=== Influential documents ===
- In 1892, the Unió Catalanista, a confederation of Catalan centres approved the Bases de Manresa (Manresa Bases) the first draft statute of self-government for Catalonia and laid the essential conditions for a Catalan Regional Constitution.
- Bases propositions included:
  - Catalan should be the sole official language in Catalonia
  - Public order be under the jurisdiction of the Catalan government exclusively, which should also control finance and taxation
  - Catalans only should be eligible for public office in Catalonia
  - Military service (from which the upper class could buy exemption) was to be replaced by a volunteer corps
  - As prior to 1714, there should be no appeal from decisions of the Catalan high court.
- The Bases also called for the composition of a Catalan Parliament, which was to be elected by 'all heads of family, grouped together in classes based on manual work, technical skill or professional careers and on property, industry and commerce, as far as possible through the corresponding guild organizations'
- The 1408 Liber Manifesti of Manresa is an influential historical document that lets us peer into Renaissance practice of slavery.
- The Liber Manifesti consistently designates slaves as distinct from other servants and provides us with basic but prior elusive figures like the total number of slaves in the town, the proportion of slaves to free people, the percentage of households who owned slaves, the proportion of women and children amongst slaves, and the market value of female, male, and child slaves.

=== Jewish history ===
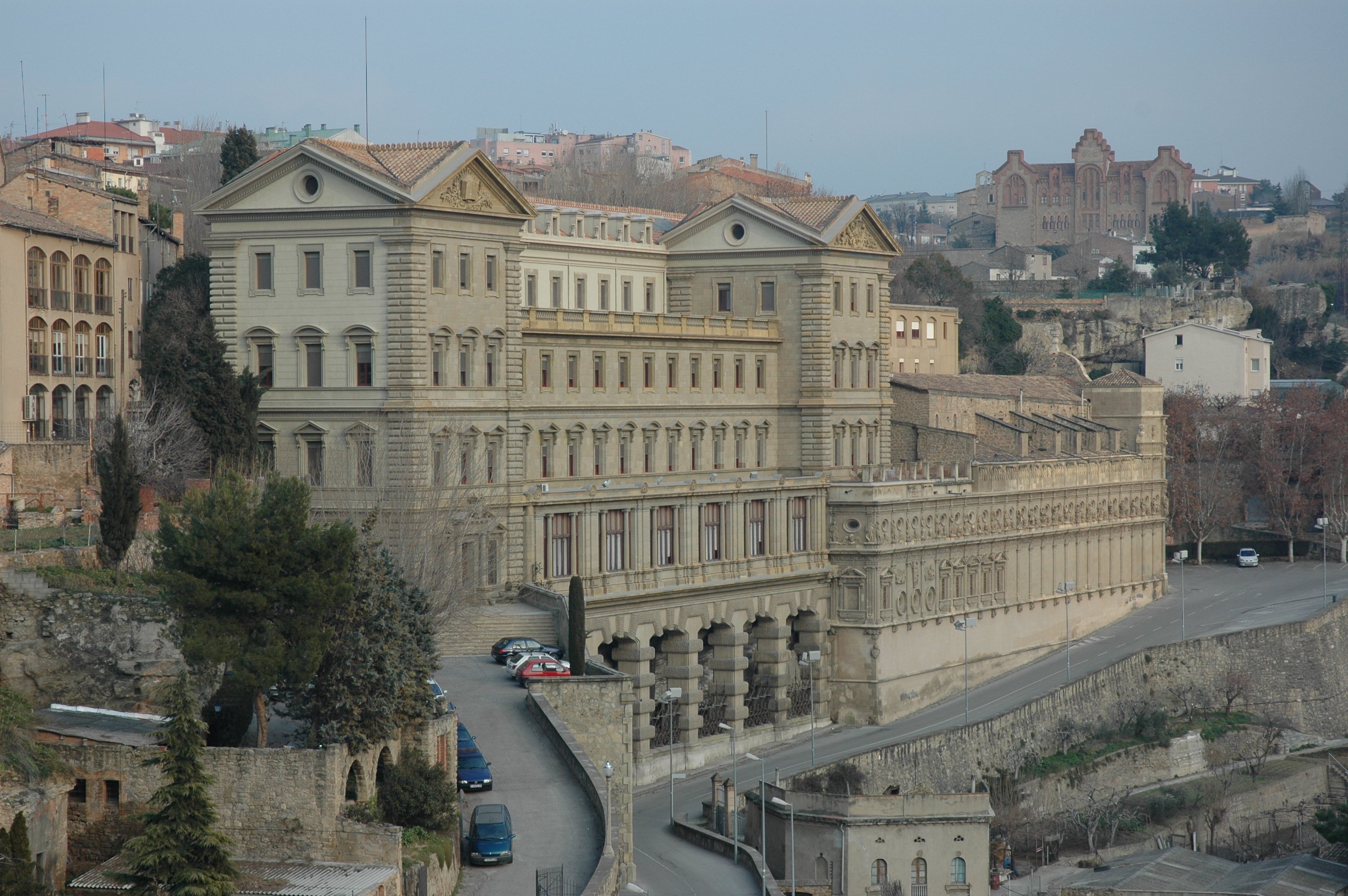
The Santa Cova, where St Ignatius stayed during his time in Manresa

In the 12th century Manresa was said to have contained 500 Jewish families, most of whom lived in a narrow lane called "Grau dels Jueus", near the town hall, where recently a Jewish bath has been discovered; their cemetery, still called "Fossana dels Jueus," was outside the city. In the 13th and 14th centuries the Jews there were engaged in manufacturing, trading, money-lending, and in the cultivation of their vineyards and estates.

The hostility of the Christians towards the Jews, which prevailed throughout Catalonia, was also manifested in Manresa. In 1325 the Christian inhabitants of the town tried to prevent the Jews from baking their Passover bread, so that the latter were obliged to appeal to the King for protection. The Jews in Manresa did not escape the general persecution of 1391, and a number of them professed to accept Christianity.

After 1414 comparatively few Jews remained in the town, and in 1492 they sold their property for whatever they could get, and left the country. At the beginning of the 15th century Manresa had 30,000 inhabitants; three centuries later it contained barely one-fifth of that number. Several members of the Zabarra (Sabara) family lived in Manresa. The town is not mentioned in the "Shebeṭ Yehudah."

== Climate ==
Manresa has a humid subtropical (Köppen Cfa), with cold winters and hot, moderately dry summers, while the rainiest seasons are spring and autumn.

Climate data for Manresa (1971–2000)
Month	Jan	Feb	Mar	Apr	May	Jun	Jul	Aug	Sep	Oct	Nov	Dec	Year
Record high °C (°F)	20.0 (68.0)	23.5 (74.3)	28.9 (84.0)	28.5 (83.3)	35.6 (96.1)	40.0 (104.0)	43.0 (109.4)	42.5 (108.5)	38.0 (100.4)	31.9 (89.4)	26.4 (79.5)	20.6 (69.1)	43.0 (109.4)
Mean daily maximum °C (°F)	10.0 (50.0)	13.1 (55.6)	16.7 (62.1)	19.0 (66.2)	23.0 (73.4)	27.3 (81.1)	31.3 (88.3)	30.6 (87.1)	26.5 (79.7)	20.8 (69.4)	14.3 (57.7)	10.5 (50.9)	20.3 (68.5)
Daily mean °C (°F)	4.9 (40.8)	7.0 (44.6)	9.8 (49.6)	12.2 (54.0)	16.3 (61.3)	20.5 (68.9)	23.9 (75.0)	23.7 (74.7)	20.1 (68.2)	14.9 (58.8)	9.2 (48.6)	5.9 (42.6)	14.0 (57.2)
Mean daily minimum °C (°F)	−0.2 (31.6)	0.9 (33.6)	2.9 (37.2)	5.3 (41.5)	9.5 (49.1)	13.6 (56.5)	16.4 (61.5)	16.7 (62.1)	13.7 (56.7)	9.0 (48.2)	4.0 (39.2)	1.3 (34.3)	7.7 (45.9)
Record low °C (°F)	−19.0 (−2.2)	−11.5 (11.3)	−9.0 (15.8)	−5.0 (23.0)	1.4 (34.5)	5.0 (41.0)	9.0 (48.2)	8.0 (46.4)	−3.0 (26.6)	−8.0 (17.6)	−10.0 (14.0)	−10.4 (13.3)	−19.0 (−2.2)
Average precipitation mm (inches)	39.2 (1.54)	21.1 (0.83)	31.9 (1.26)	48.6 (1.91)	68.2 (2.69)	53.2 (2.09)	22.9 (0.90)	46.7 (1.84)	65.3 (2.57)	59.1 (2.33)	47.9 (1.89)	42.9 (1.69)	546.9 (21.53)
Average rainy days	5.8	4.4	4.9	7.6	8.4	6.4	4.0	5.4	6.4	6.6	5.6	5.8	71.1
Source: Servei Meteorològic de Catalunya

== Main sights ==
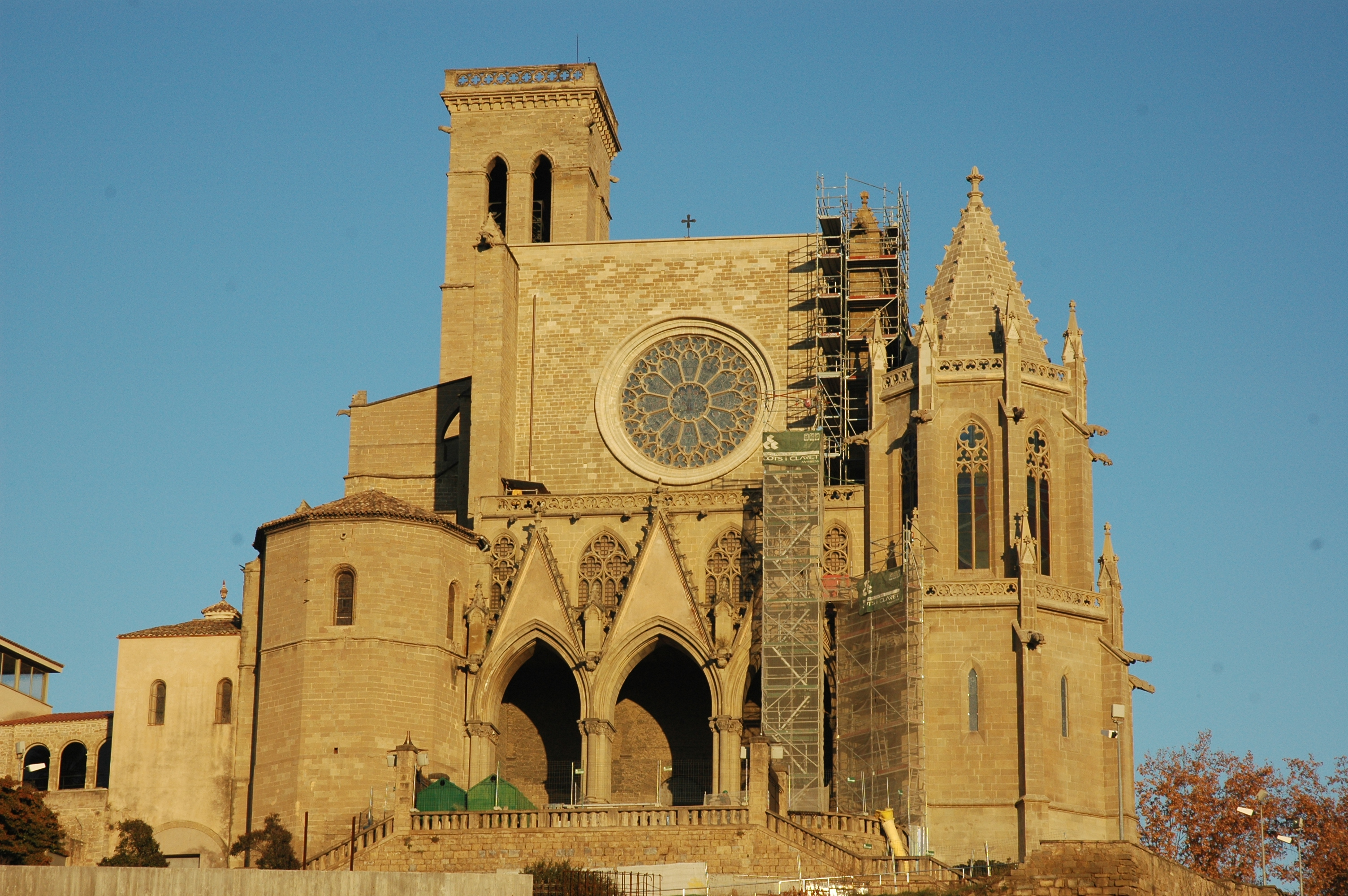
La Seu from the Tower of Santa Caterina

Three bridges cross the Cardener River. The 14th-century basilica of Santa Maria de la Seu stands on a rock above the oldest bridge. La Seu is the principal monument of Manresa. The church we can see today was designed by Berenguer de Montagut who also designed Santa Maria del Mar, Barcelona. The architectural style is characteristic of Catalan Gothic. The work began in 1325, but the church was not finished until the end of the 15th century. The municipal museum is housed in the cloisters of the 17th-century church of Sant Ignasi. This church is part of the sanctuary known as the Cave of Saint Ignatius (in Catalan Cova de Sant Ignasi), built over a cave in which Ignatius of Loyola is said to have prayed and meditated.

== Economy ==
Industry in the town covers textile-making, metallurgy, and glass manufacture.

== Transport ==
Manresa is served by Josep Tarradellas Barcelona–El Prat Airport which is located 67 km (42 mi) south east of the city centre.

== Sport ==
Bàsquet Manresa is a professional basketball club based at the Pavelló Nou Congost. They play in the Spanish Premier Championship which they won once, in 1998.

== Major events ==
The Fira Mediterrania in Manresa is held the first complete weekend in November every year. It is the main meeting point and trade fair of the mediterranean world, folk and roots artists with distributors, organisers, agencies, labels, export offices, instrument makers and dealers, journalists and other professionals.

== Manresa Town Hall ==
The original building dates back to the 19th century.

Remodeling was agreed to be needed due to the old building's impractical use in Modern times. At the end of 2004, a competition was held to remodel the building with the aim of easing its disabled circulation.

The Barcelona-based Add + Arquitectura was selected and the project was completed in 2008. Add partners Manuel Bailo and Rosa Rull were responsible for the design. Bailo and Rull's key move was to partly demolish and extend the rear south-west wall of the town hall in order to implant a new circulation core

The front of the building maintained its traditional structure but at the rear of the building, the elevator and staircase are encased in a "cubist cacoon".

== Places borrowing the name ==
- Because of the town's association with Ignatius of Loyola, the novitiate house of the English province of the Jesuits is called Manresa House. Formerly in Roehampton in the London suburbs, it is now in Birmingham.
- SEARSOLIN, the extension/outreach research center of Xavier University – Ateneo de Cagayan, is also called the Manresa Farm.
- Manresa School takes its name from the town of Manresa, because Saint Candida Maria de Jesus, the founder of the congregation that runs the school, was influenced by Ignatian spirituality.
- Manresa House of Retreats was founded by the Jesuit religious order on the banks of the Mississippi River, midway between Baton Rouge and New Orleans, in Convent, Louisiana. The 130-acre campus hosts three-day preached retreats for men, made in silence, based on the Spiritual Exercises of Ignatius Loyola.
- Manresa Island is a 144-acre coastal property in Norwalk, Connecticut, that is the site of a decommissioned coal-fired power plant.
- Manresa State Beach is a state-protected beach on Monterey Bay near Watsonville in Santa Cruz County, California.

== External relations ==
=== Twin towns ===
- Sant Joan de Vilatorrada
- Sant Vicenç de Castellet

=== European cooperation ===
- Manresa is a member city of Eurotowns

== Famous people ==
- Juan Ignacio Cirac Sasturain, physicist
- Toni Elías, professional motorcycle racer and inaugural champion of the Moto2 World Championship.
- Manuel Estiarte, former water polo player
- Manel Fontdevila, cartoonist
- Pol Freixanet, Spanish footballer
- Joaquín Gomis Cornet, Carlist politician and businessman
- Jordi Lardín, former footballer
- Rafael de Mestre, electric car pioneer and racing driver
- Maria Picassó, illustrator
- Nuria Rial, soprano
- Joan Ribó, mayor of Valencia
- Berto Romero, humorist
- Jorge Carrillo de Albornoz Torres, Spanish Youtuber
