= Manresa School =

Roman Catholic school in Parañaque, Philippines

Location
- Candida Ma. Street, BF Homes; Parañaque, Metro Manila; Philippines
- 14°26′22″N 121°01′33″E

Information
- Type: Private, Co-educational, Roman Catholic, Hijas de Jesus Sisters
- Motto: Tatak Manresa:Kapatid sa Kapwa
- Established: June 19, 1971
- Status: Single
- School district: District 2, Parañaque
- Oversight: Hijas de Jesus
- Principal: Yolanda N. Cruz (grade school), Gemma K. Doguiles (high school)
- Grades: K to 12
- Enrollment: 2000+
- Campus: Urban, ~ 3 hectares
- Colors: Blue and White
- Rival: Veritas
- Accreditation: Elementary PAASCU level 3; High School PAASCU level 3
- Yearbook: Manresan
- Affiliations: Hijas de Jesus
- School Hymn: "Hail Manresa"
- Website: http://www.manresaschool.edu.ph

Manresa School is a private, co-educational Roman Catholic school in Parañaque. Established in 1971, Manresa School is run by the nuns of the Congregation of the Hijas de Jesus, founded by Candida Maria de Jesus.

Manresa School offers education in the Preschool (Nursery & Kindergarten), Elementary (Grades 1 to 6), Junior High (Grades 7 to 10) & Senior High (Grades 11 to 12).

== Name ==
The Daughters of Jesus chose the name Manresa due to the significance of the place to the congregation as Candida Maria de Jesus was a follower of Ignatian spirituality; Saint Ignatius of Loyola used to spend time praying in a cave at Manresa, Spain.

== Logo ==
The Manresa Logo consists of a cross, and the letters I, H and S with the words Hijas de Jesus, Parañaque encircling the bottom part of the circle.

== History of Manresa ==
In 1961, after the Catholic Church's call for a school to be built outside of Manila, the Daughters of Jesus acquired a 3 hectare lot of land in BF Homes, with the help of mining executive Jesus S Cabarrus, Sr.

The school opened on June 19, 1971, run by Sisters Angeles Garcia, F.I., Gertrudes Magdayao, F.I., Rosa Ortega, F.I. and Victoria Ruy, F.I. The next year, the school began accepting students for the primary grades, adding grade levels every year thereafter until the elementary department was completed.

Manresa School began accepting High School students in School Year 1977-1978. Manresa's first high school class graduated on March 26, 1981, the same year the school was granted a license for a Nursery department.

== Accreditation ==
Manresa's Elementary department gained Level 1 Accreditation through the Philippine Accrediting Association of Schools, Colleges and Universities on May 31, 2001. The High School department was granted Level 2 PAASCU Accreditation on January 31, 2003, which was renewed for another five years on May 5, 2008.
