= María Antonia Bandrés Elósegui =

Spanish Roman Catholic professed religious

Blessed María Antonia Bandrés Elósegui FI
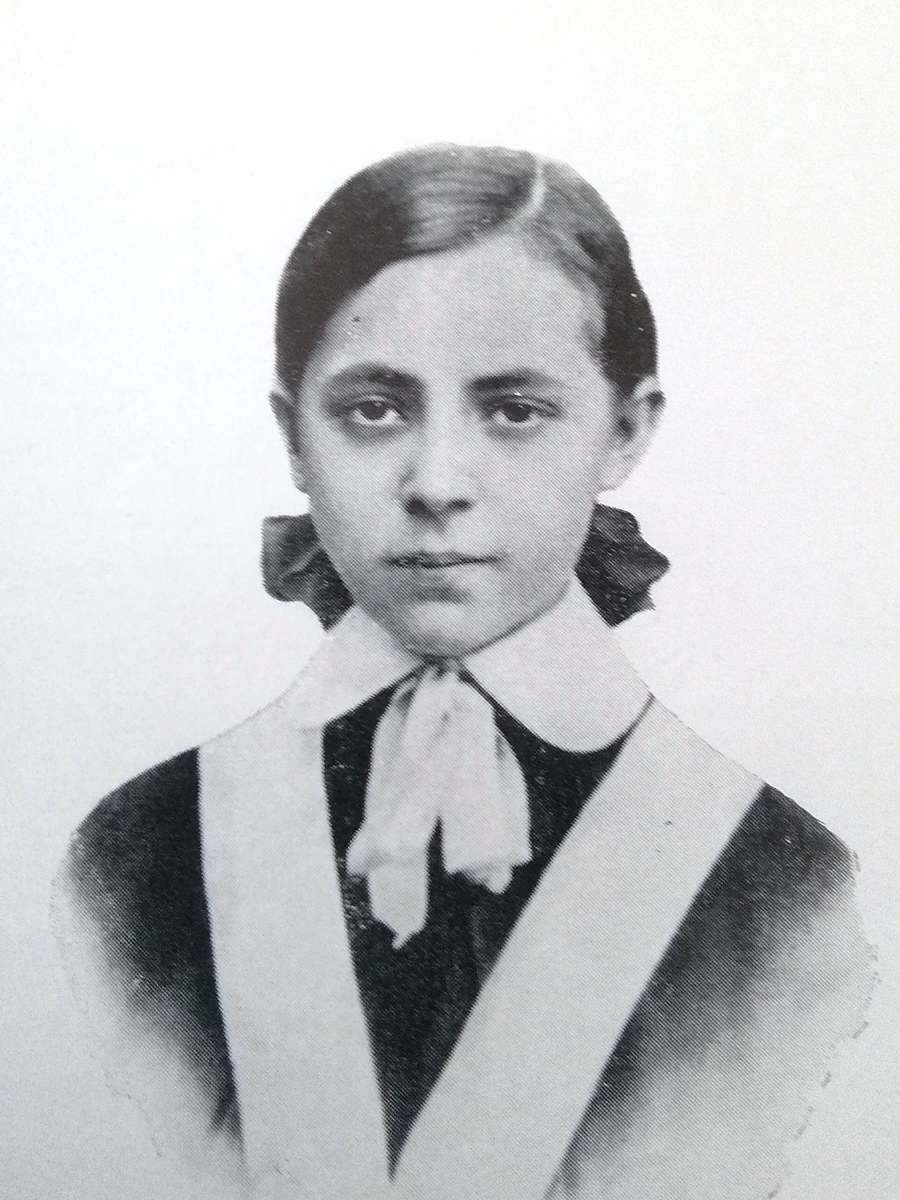

Virgin
- Born: 6 March 1898; Tolosa, Guipúzcoa, Kingdom of Spain
- Died: 27 April 1919 (aged 21); Salamanca, Kingdom of Spain
- Venerated in: Roman Catholic Church
- Beatified: 12 May 1996, Saint Peter's Square, Vatican City by Pope John Paul II
- Feast: 27 April

María Antonia Bandrés Elósegui (6 March 1898 – 27 April 1919) was a Spanish Roman Catholic religious sister of the Daughters of Jesus. She lived a brief life but was noted for her ardent faith and her Marian devotion while also being known for the effect she had on the faithful as well as agnostics whom she came into contact with. The beatification process for Elósegui opened in 1982; Pope John Paul II beatified her in mid-1996.

== Life ==
María Antonia Bandrés Elósegui was born in Tolosa – in the Kingdom of Spain – as the second of fifteen children born to the Atty. Ramon Bandrés and Teresa Elósegui. Her paternal uncle and godfather was Antonio Bandrés. Her siblings and parents often referred to her as "Antonita". She would accompany her mother on charitable work for the poor and needy.

Bandrés Elósegui attended a school that the Daughters of Spain managed in her town. In 1913 while making the Spiritual Exercises of St. Ignatius she met the Daughter's founder Candida Maria of Jesus who said to her: "You will be a Daughter of Jesus". She entered the religious life in that congregation in Salamanca on 8 December 1915, the Feast of the Immaculate Conception. She made her solemn religious profession on 31 May 1918 and then fell ill that June, marking the start of a long illness and then death ten months later. Her confessor around this time was Ilario Oscoz.

Her doctor, Filiberto Villalobos, testified that he was moved as he cared for the nun due to her ardent spirit and her commitment to the faith. Her death impacted the agnostic doctor as well as Miguel de Unamuno and Indalecio Prieto who left either oral or written testimonies about the impact her death had on them.

She died on 27 April 1919 while singing a Marian Song, calling upon Mary as the "Mother of Mercy".

== Beatification ==
The beatification process commenced with the inauguration of an informative process in Salamanca that opened on 23 January 1962. This concluded the following year after her writings were checked by theologians who certified their orthodoxy, on 10 July 1970, leading to the formal introduction of her cause on 11 May 1982, which entitled her to the title Servant of God. The Congregation for the Causes of Saints validated these two previous processes in Rome on 27 January 1983 and received the positio in 1989 for further evaluation.

Elósegui became titled as venerable on 6 April 1995, after Pope John Paul II confirmed the fact that she had lived a life of heroic virtue. A miracle attributed to the intercession of Elósegui was investigated in Spain and received validation on 12 May 1995 from the Congregation before a medical team approved it on 11 January 1996; theologians also assented on 29 March 1996 and the Congregation as well on 16 April 1996. The pope issued his approval of this on 30 April 1996 and later beatified Elósegui in Saint Peter's Square on 12 May 1996. The postulator for this cause is Ana Maria Cinco.
