= French School in Zagreb =

French school in Zagreb, Croatia

Coordinates: 45.8359°N 15.9934°E

- École Française de Zagreb; Francuska škola Zagreb
- Zagreb; Croatia

Information
- Established: 1996

French School in Zagreb (French: École Française de Zagreb EFZ, Croatian: Francuska škola Zagreb) is a French international school in the EuroCampus in Zagreb, Croatia.

== History ==
The school opened in 1996 and started classes at the EuroCampus, which also houses the Deutsche Internationale Schule in Zagreb, on September 1, 2005.

The school directly teaches primaire (primary) and collège (junior high school) levels. Lycée (senior high school/sixth form) students take classes by the National Centre for Distance Education (CNED) distance education service.
