= Maria Picassó =

Catalan illustrator and cartoonist (born 1963)

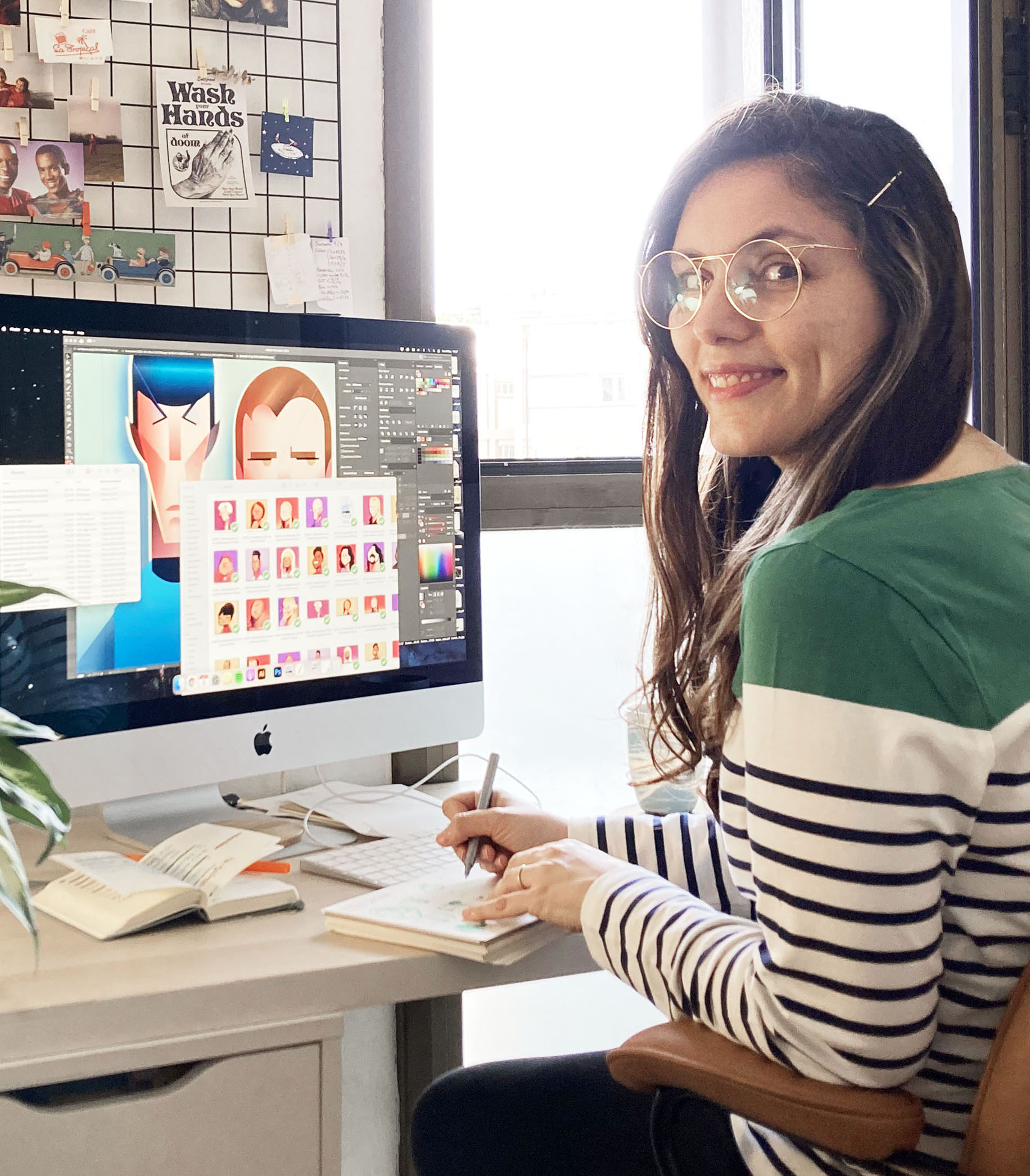
- Born: Maria Picassó i Piquer; 1983 (age 42–43); Manresa, Catalonia, Spain
- Occupations: Illustrator, cartoonist

Maria Picassó i Piquer (born 1983) is a Catalan illustrator and cartoonist. One of her creations was chosen by the international jury of Communication Arts to be part of its 2022 yearbook of illustrations.

== Biography ==
Maria Picassó studied architecture, but shortly after entering to work in an office, she left it to devote herself to plastic arts. As an illustrator, she has worked in sectors as diverse as press, video games, album covers, billboards, books and clothing. Her style has been cataloged as "geometric vectorial constructivist portraits". She aims to simplify her drawings as much as possible, leaving only the most defining and essential features, and usually using geometric shapes to recreate faces and objects. Picassó has cited as influences Al Hirschfeld, Hanoch Piven, Charley Harper, Scott Partridge, Robin Davey and Maite Franchi.

She has made several book covers, album covers by artists such as Markus Reuter or Stick Men, illustrations for the press (El País, Los Angeles Times), billboards and in video games of the Star Trek franchise.

Due to the premiere of the new film adaptation of Dune (Denis Villeneuve, September 2021), the Catalan publishers Mai Més and Raig Verd published a new translated edition of the original book Dune (Frank Herbert, 1965), in binding paperback and illustration by Maria Picassó. Her design for the cover of the book was one of those chosen, among the 3,689 proposals submitted, to appear in the Communication Arts Illustration Annual from May–June 2022.

The city council of her home town Manresa, in Catalonia, named her "Ambassador of Manresa".

In 2022, Picasso published her first book as an illustrator, with text by Agnès Rotger: La Caçadora de Dinosaures, about the life of the British paleontologist Mary Anning.
