= German European School Manila =

Deutsche Europäische Schule Manila
- German European School Manila Paaralang Europeo Alemana Maynila
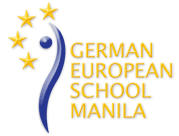

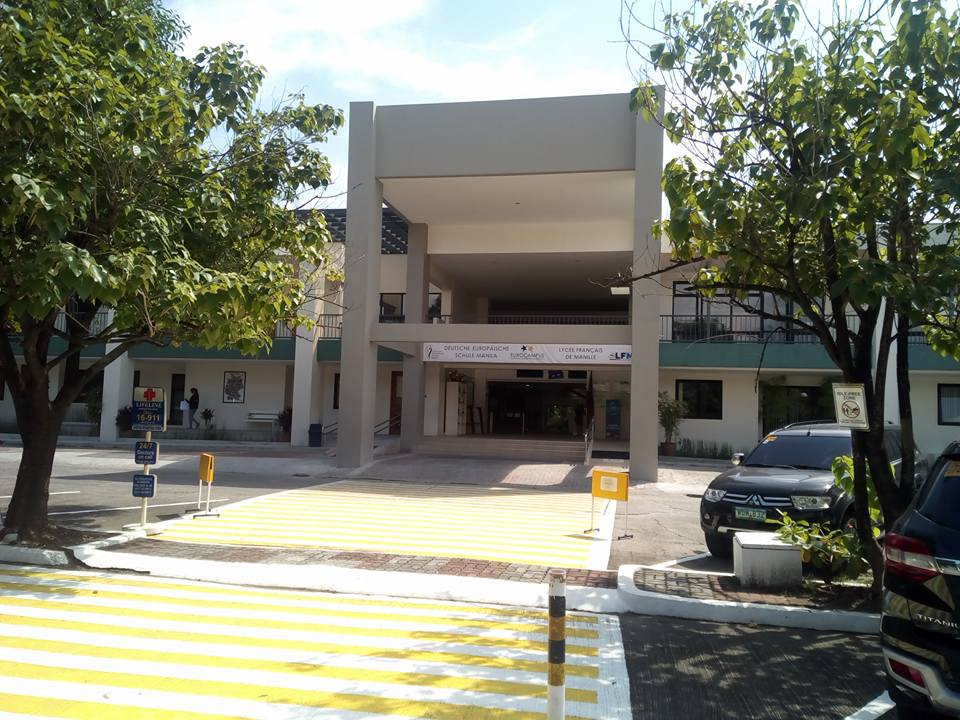
- Entrance of German and French School in Manila (European International School)

Location
- 75 Swaziland Street, Better Living Subdivision, Parañaque; Parañaque, 1711; 14.486595°N 121.014588°E

Information
- Other names: GESM, Eurocampus, European International School
- Former names: José Rizal-Schule (1890-2008)
- School type: Recognized German, Cambridge and IB school, UNESCO affiliated, accredited by the Philippines Non-profit, international, secular
- Motto: Learning together for our future.
- Established: 1980
- Headmaster: Christoph-Boris Frank
- Enrolment: 380
- Colours: blue and yellow
- Mascot: Tarsier
- Website: www.gesm.org

The German European School Manila ("GESM") is a German School offering a fully bilingual K-12 program in Manila to German and international students. It is an IB World School, a Cambridge and EdExcel school, part of the UNESCO-ASPnet and a two-time recipient of the "Excellent German School Abroad" seal from German authorities.

Until Grade 10, GESM's classes have two parallel branches, defined by the main language of instruction: English or German. Students finish the 10th grade by taking either the German school-leaving examinations or the IGCSE (International General Certificate for Secondary Education). For Grades 11 and 12, GESM offers both the Diploma Programme (DP) and the Career-related Programme (CP) of the International Baccalaureate Organization (IBO). The Diploma Programme is offered either in English or in a bilingual form, offering History and Biology in German (GIB gemischtsprachiges IB). In either form, the diploma qualifies for university entry in German-speaking countries and worldwide.

According to its identity as a UNESCO-affiliated school, GESM fosters sustainability projects and social projects, as well as democratic values and bonds to Germany.

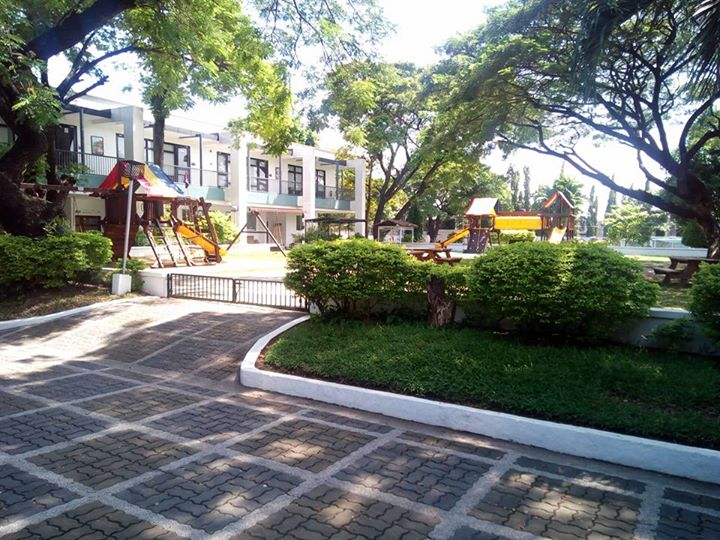
French and German Pre-Primary and buildings of IB-Section

== History ==
The German school was founded in 1980 as the Jose-Rizal Schule: Deutschsprachige Auslandsschule Manila (DSM) in honor of the Philippine national hero Jose Rizal.

In 1992, the Jose-Rizal Schule and its French partner school, the École Française de Manille (EFM), moved in together to share a two-hectare campus that came to be known as the Eurocampus and where it still is based today. This joint-campus model was the first of its kind in the world and was followed by other European international schools abroad including Shanghai, Dublin, Zagreb, and Majorca, among others.

DSM and EFM joined forces in 2003 to form the European International School (EIS), a body that would be able to offer the IB Diploma Programme for Grades 11 and 12. However, by 2006, only DSM was handling operations of EIS. In 2006 the school was called "German International School". In 2008, the school formally adopted its present name, "German European School Manila" (GESM), and founded an English-based section called the "European Section" (later: "International Section").

School Year 2014-15 saw the GESM offer the IGCSE examinations for the first time. Soon after, it also received accreditation to offer the official German Language Diploma (DSD I) examinations.

In 2019 the first DSD II exams were held.

In 2021, the Career-related Programme was introduced, offering senior high school students academic subjects combined with vocational training.

== Organization. ==
The German European School Manila has two branches: the German Section, leading to official German exams after the 9th and 10th grades, and an International Section, originally called Euro-Section, starting with the PYP in Primary and going on with the Cambridge and IGCSE-programmes in Secondary.

Knowledge of the German language is not a requirement for entry, but students are supported to switch from the International to the German Section: Students without previous knowledge of German are integrated through immersive language learning in GESM's bilingual kindergarten and through an intensive language training programme allowing entrance into grades 1-7 without previous knowledge of German.

Both sections lead to the IB Diploma Programme in classes 11 and 12. Students are offered the option to foster their German language skills in special courses or in one or more subjects like Biology, History, Mathematics and Chemistry where tuition is offered in German.

GESM provides not only a highly international environment but offers transition to any German and international school and university, as well as to the German Dual Study System and to 450 Vocational Training Programmes in Germany.

The school is recognized, supervised and supported by the German government.

Non-German speakers are prepared for the DSD I and DSD II exams, German native speakers for the Cambridge Language exams up to the Certificate of Proficiency.

== European International School ==
The European Educational Foundation, Inc. (EEFI) is an association under Philippine law with ten members. It owns the land and buildings of the Eurocampus and its mission is to nurture, promote and develop the education and interests of the members of the European Community, especially the two founding schools, the Lycée Français de Manille and the Deutsche Schule Manila.

== Location: Eurocampus Manila ==
As part of the European International School it is located on Eurocampus in 75 Swaziland St., Better Living Subdivision, Parañaque, Metro Manila, Philippines.

GESM shares its 2-hectare campus with the French School of Manila (French: Lycée Français de Manille). Together they form the European International School, and the shared campus is called "Eurocampus". All the school's facilities are located here, including swimming pools, auditorium, a playground, a gymnasium, a school canteen, an infirmary, laboratories, a school library, a boutique for school supplies, sports facilities, a school garden and aquaponics facilities.

== Accreditation ==
GESM is officially recognized by the Philippine state, and by the German government.

The school is an accredited IB school, offering the International Baccalaureate Diploma Programme and the Career Programme. It has also received Cambridge and EdExcel accreditation. It is recognized as a UNESCO affiliated school.

== Reception ==
The German European School Manila is the setting of the adventure novel Lenni und Wolff by Susanne Hämmerle. It is also the subject of the autobiographical and satirical novel Expat unplugged by Horst Giesler.

== Former students ==
- Verena Wriedt (born 9. January 1975 in Wiesbaden), a German journalist and TV host.
- Sandra Ines Seifert (born 1. February 1984 in Manila), a German-Filipino model, Miss Earth 2009.
