= Eco Grand Prix =

Electric motorsport series

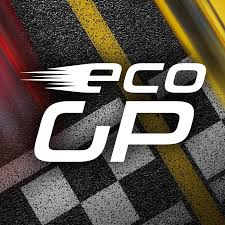
- Country: International
- Drivers: 120
- Teams: 40
- Official website: ecograndprix.com

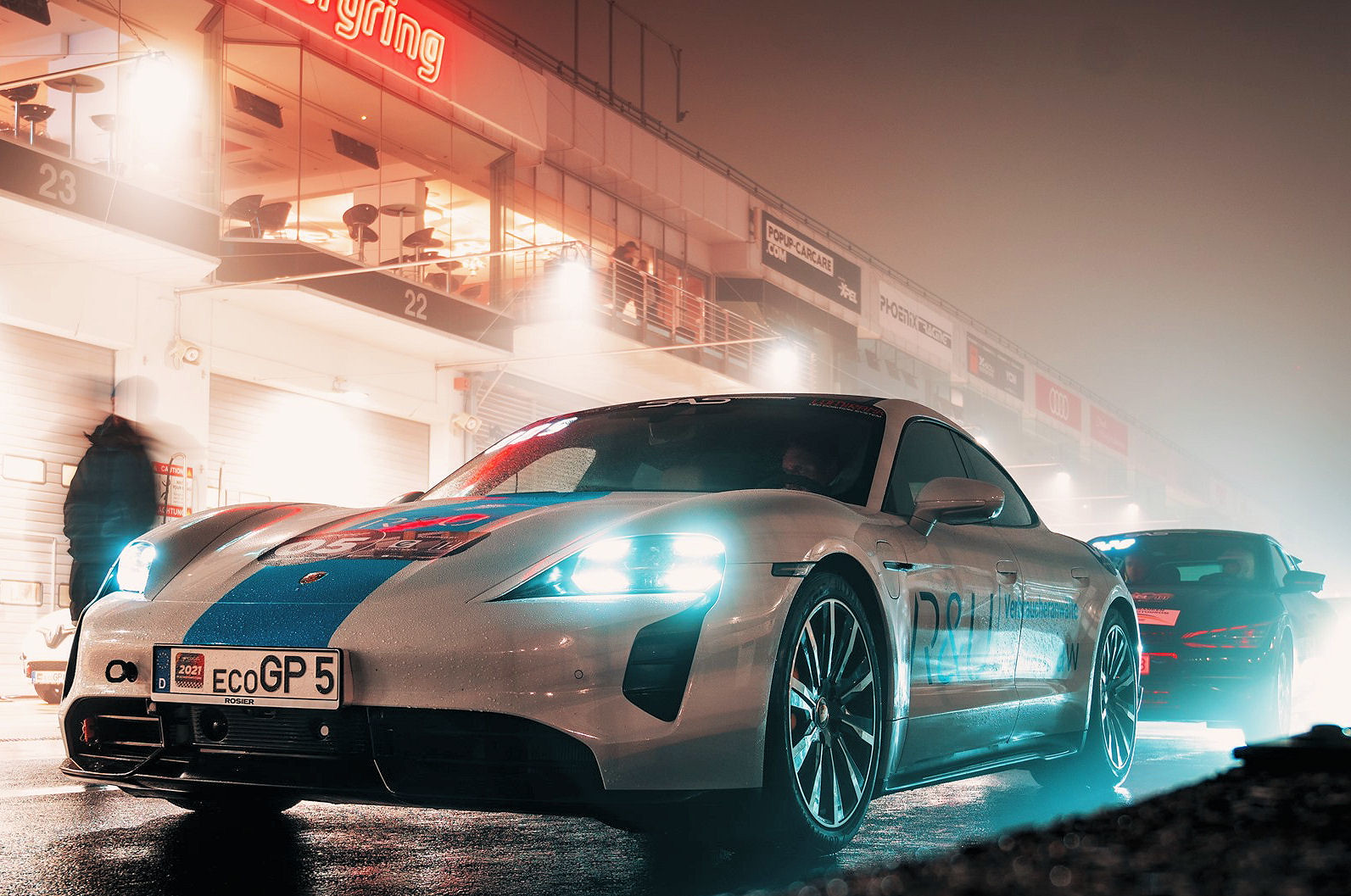
Nürburgring

EcoGP, officially the Eco Grand Prix, is a European 24-hour car race for electric cars.

== History ==
The green series was conceived in 2013 by the world record holder Rafael de Mestre, holding several world records in driving with electric cars like the fastest circumnavigation (2016) or the longest trip in a production EV (2024). In 2018, the world's first 24-hour race for electric cars started in the Motorsport Arena Oschersleben in Germany.

The 24-hour race is won by the car that covers the greatest distance in 24 hours. The role model for the series was the 24 Hours of Le Mans. Drivers in the cup included Jutta Kleinschmidt, Volker Strycek, Michel von Tell and Rafael de Mestre.

2018 it was the first 24-hour race in which electric production cars like Tesla Model S, Hyundai Ioniq, BMW i3, Renault ZOE, Volkswagen e-Golf and others took part. Thirty cars and 98 drivers took part in the first 24-hour electric car race. In 2019 forty electric cars started in Oschersleben, an unbroken world record until today.

In the later years EVs from Porsche, Opel, Kia and Jaguar joined the competition. Prototypes can join the ecoGP in a separate category.

Among the racing tracks Transilvania Motor Ring, Nürburgring, Hungaroring and Yas Marina Circuit in Abu Dhabi there have been are also street courses in Zell am See, Schauinsland, Rund um Schotten and the famous Circuit des Platanes in the city center of Perpignan.

From 2013 until 2023 in total 982 drivers started at 28 ecoGP competitions all around the world.

The series has been a member of DMSB (German Motor Sport Federation) since 2020.

== See also ==
- Electric motorsport
- Extreme E
