= Rafael de Mestre =

Spanish IT consultant (born 1963)

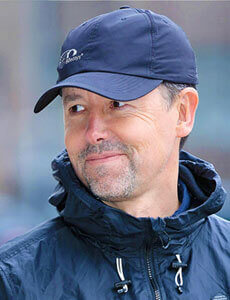
de Mestre after his second circumnavigation of the world

Rafael de Mestre Gebauer (born February 1, 1963, in Manresa) is an experienced IT consultant and electric car pioneer. He has achieved the impressive feat of traveling around the world four times in an electric car.

In 2011, Rafael de Mestre took part in a rally "Tesla goes east", 10,000 km through Europe from Sweden to Romania, to the Black Sea with his Tesla Roadster.

He has won the following competitions:

- 2011: "Tesla goes east": 10,000 km through Europe from Sweden to Romania to the Black Sea
- 2014: Winner of the Swiss Energy Grand Prix
- 2015: Winner of the eTourEurope
- 2017: EV Trophy Winner

De Mestre organized nine international electric car races that took place in 2019 as well as the world's first 24-hour electric car race in 2018, the Eco Grand Prix. The 2023 season marks the 10th anniversary and a stop of the ecoGP series.

== Round-the-world trips ==
In 2012, de Mestre traveled around the world for the first time in his Tesla Roadster and won against a French team. In 2016 he drove around the world in 80 days.

On June 16, 2016, he made a second trip around the world which began at the Arc de Triomf in Barcelona and ended on September 4, 2016, with his Tesla Model S. In this endeavor he was joined by 11 international teams. The race is designed to promote the role of electric cars globally as a sustainable means of transportation around the world in all types of terrain and climates.

The race is also aimed at fostering innovation and development of EV technology to increase the distances that electric cars can cover without needing to stop for charging.

September 6, 2022.he shipped his Tesla Roadster emission free with the Avontuur sailing ship over the Atlantic Ocean to US and started by this the third around the world trip which he finished 2024 after a lot of delays because of the Fremantle Highway Fox News rumor that an EV could have caused the fire there. Even after it was proved an EV not being the cause of the fire, ship captains denied to transport EVs.

Just after arriving he started his 4th round-the-world trip for 2024. A family with 3 kids in a Model 3 followed him and again he broke a world record. This time the longest trip in a standard electric car 42.105 km. (Electrec article)

He is planning the 5th edition for 2030 and started recruiting teams who want to be one of the knights of the round table fighting against pollution.
