= Michel von Tell =

Swiss journalist and consultant (born 1980)

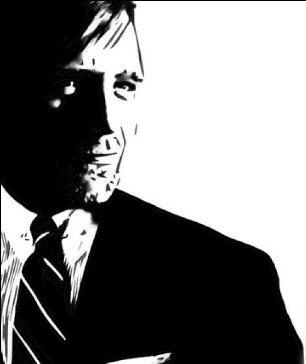
Michel von Tell

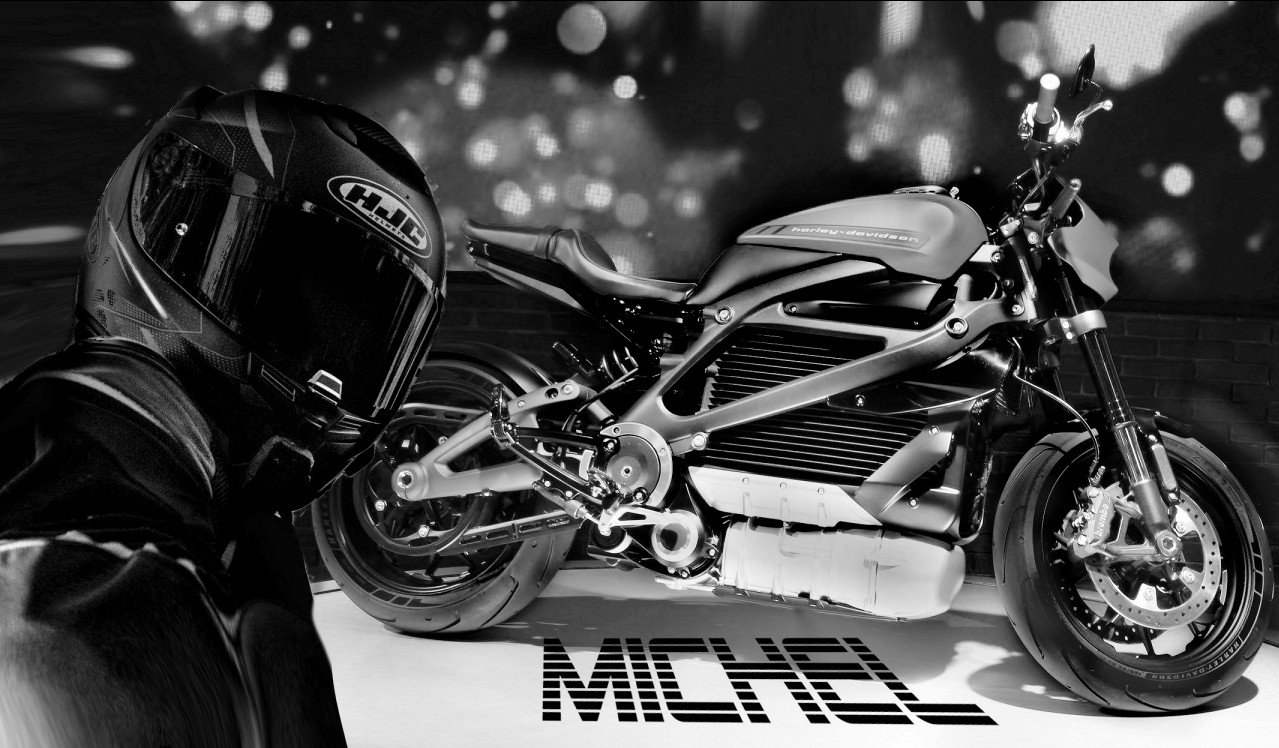
Von Tell's LiveWire electric motorcycle

Michel von Tell (born October 8, 1980) is a Swiss journalist, consultant, artist and racing driver.

== Life ==
Von Tell was a professional baseball player in the Swiss NLB league. Von Tell studied economics and was active in the financial investment sector. In 2012 he sold most of his companies and began to work in media. Since 2020, von Tell worked as a consultant in the German Parliament (Bundestag).

Von Tell occasionally participates in Poker tournaments and appears to be, according to the "Swiss Money List" by HedonMob, among the best 100 Players in the country (place 70).

Von Tell's podcast recorded more than ten million views and he was listed in the 100 most important European YouTubers by the biggest Lifestyle Magazine of Germany Top Magazin (Place 30). In his 2012 podcast, numerous notable guests appeared, such as: Ulrich Kienzle, Ariadne von Schirach, Winfried Hassemer (vice president Federal Constitutional Court), Rainer Langhans, Hans Söllner, Sepp Holzer, Christoph Sieber, and Gerhart Baum (Federal Minister of the Interior). He also ran a comedy show inspired by American late-night formats, with his podcasts and videos amassing over 20 million views in total and peaking at more than two million views per month. In his late 20s, he spent two years living a reclusive, hermit-like lifestyle in a secluded forest cabin, accompanied by his Doberman dog, seeking to continue the studies of Henry David Thoreau and compare them to modern times, 150 years later. Von Tell occasionally performs as a DJ at festivals and big clubs like the Zürich Street Parade or the Ibiza Space Club. In 2023, he performed at the legendary Full Moon Party in Asia, one of the top five music festivals in the world. He is involved in charitable activities associated with the Love Ride in his hometown of Zurich, a major motorcycle event that attracts 20,000 visitors and is dedicated to supporting sick children.

In 2013, Von Tell did a documentary with Peter Scholl-Latour and worked together with him in some projects. He also did the last big Interview with Scholl-Latour which died in 2014. Scholl-Latour was one of the most famous European journalists for over a half century, comparable to Walter Cronkite in the USA. In 2023, he played a pivotal role in the international effort to liberalize cannabis laws in Germany and was instrumental in implementing several significant changes. In April 2024, cannabis was ultimately legalized in Germany, with more liberal regulations than initially expected.

== Motorsport ==
During 2000, Von Tell placed sixth at the Rwanda Mountain Rally in a Toyota. The Rwanda Mountain Gorilla Rally known originally as the Fraternity Rally and is an international rally event by WRC.

In 2020, Von Tell drove a world record on a LiveWire, the first electric Harley Davidson motorcycle. He drove 1724 km (1070 Miles) in less than 24 hours. His ride went through four countries, more than 400 km more than the old record which was 1316 km . He started in Switzerland over Germany to Austria and finished the record in the Microstate Liechtenstein. The ride was accompanied by an audience, a Harley team from the local press and 6 independent judge observers which documented the record officially. The record obtained huge attention all over the world and is still unbroken as of 2022.

Von Tell was part at the Eco Grand Prix in Team Porsche. At the 24 hours Grand Prix of Nürburgring, he started on the new Porsche Taycan. The first full electric car by Porsche.
