= St. James College of Parañaque =

Defunct private college in Parañaque, Philippines

St James College of Parañaque
- Motto: Our Symbol is Quality Education
- Type: Private, non-sectarian Coeducational Basic and Higher education institution
- Active: 1987–2012
- Founders: Jaime T. Torres; Myrna Montealegre-Torres
- Chairman: Myrna M. Torres
- Chancellor: Dr. Norma Abracia
- President: Mache Torres
- Location: Dr. A. Santos Ave., Parañaque, Metro Manila, Philippines; 14°27′25″N 121°02′02″E
- Campus: Urban
- Alma Mater song: St. James School Hymn
- Patron saint: St. James the Greater
- Colors: Maroon and White
- Location in Metro Manila Location in Luzon Location in the Philippines

St. James College of Parañaque (S.J.C.P.) was a private, non-sectarian academic institution in Parañaque, Metro Manila which operated from 1987 to 2012. It was established by Jaime T. Torres, a successful businessman involved in brokerage, real estate and agricultural development business, and Myrna Montealegre-Torres, a former educator at the St. Jude Catholic School and Stella Maris College.

== History ==
Opened in 1987 as St. James School of Parañaque, it was the second branch of the St. James College System (established in 1971) which includes other schools in Quezon City, Metro Manila and Calamba, Laguna. The school was located at 8408 Dr. A. Santos Avenue (more popularly known as Sucat Road) in Parañaque. Its chancellor and dean of education is Dr. Norma M. Abracia, and its principal is Nilda Sergio.

In March 2012, the school ordered its closure and was demolished to give way for SM City BF Parañaque. The front portion was converted into an open parking space and is currently occupied by AutomobiliCo Car Shop, while the rear buildings of the campus are still intact. All documents such as Form 137, Transcript of Records, certification, diploma for alumni are processed/transferred at the Quezon City campus.

== Founding and patron saint ==
Being devout Catholics, school founders Jaime and Myrna Torres found themselves adhering to the path that St. James, their patron saint, had taken. St. James the Greater was one of the twelve Apostles of Jesus Christ, and the patron saint of Spain.

In commemoration of his Feast Day every July 25, several activities were held on campus.

== Academics ==
St. James College offered the following academic programs:

=== Basic Education ===
- Pre-School
- Grade School
- High School

=== College of Hospitality Management ===
- Bachelor of Science in Hospitality Management

=== College of Education ===
- Bachelor in Elementary Education
- Bachelor in Secondary Education majors in Math, English

=== College of Arts ===
- Bachelor of Arts, major in Psychology

== Facilities ==
- Air-conditioned classrooms
- Audi-gymnasium
- Multi-purpose hall
- Quadrangle
- Computer Laboratory
- Science Laboratory
- Speech Laboratory
- Home Economics Laboratory
- Children's Activity Center
- Children's Playground
- Audio-Visual Room
- Prayer Room
- Swimming Pool
- Open Field
- Music Room
- Karate Room
- Cottages

== College hymn ==
I.
O hail, hail, hail to thee
Our dearest patron saint
St. James, our Alma Mater
Life and love for you.

II.
We sing our lovely joy
Shower us your holy care
Hail to thee, our dearest saint
St. James, our Alma Mater,
(Repeat I and II)

III.
We sing our song for you
Hail to thee our patron saint,
St. James, our Alma Mater
We sing our song divinely
Hail to thee, hail to thee
Our patron, dear St. James

(Repeat III)

== SJCP 20th anniversary celebration ==
St. James College of Parañaque celebrated their 20th anniversary November 22–30, 2007. Activities included a torch parade, family day, high school and grade school field demonstrations, a float parade, and a variety show. Since it was raining, the float parade and variety show was moved to December 6.

Many booths were opened inside the campus for the celebration.
