= Polytechnic University of the Philippines Parañaque =

Public university in Parañaque, Philippines

Polytechnic University of the Philippines Parañaque Campus
- Politeknikong Unibersidad ng Pilipinas Parañaque (Filipino)
- Motto: Ang Pamantasan ng mga Mamamayan
- Motto in English: The People's University
- Type: Public
- Established: May 12, 2011; 15 years ago
- Academic affiliations: SCUAA; ASAIHL; IAU
- President: Manuel M. Muhi
- Executive: Joseph Mercado
- Students: 68,896 Estimated total including all of its campuses
- Location: Parañaque, Philippines; 14°30′04″N 120°59′42″E
- Campus: Urban, 48 acres (19 ha)
- Colors: Maroon & gold
- Nickname: PUP Mighty Maroons
- Mascot: Mighty Maroon
- Website: www.pup.edu.ph

- Location in Metro Manila Location in Luzon Location in Philippines

Polytechnic University of the Philippines Parañaque is a satellite campus of Polytechnic University of the Philippines (PUP) located in Parañaque, Philippines. It was founded on May 12, 2011.

On February 15, 2024, President Bongbong Marcos signed into law R.A. 11979, converting the school into a regular campus of the PUP known as the PUP-Parañaque City Campus.

== Academics ==
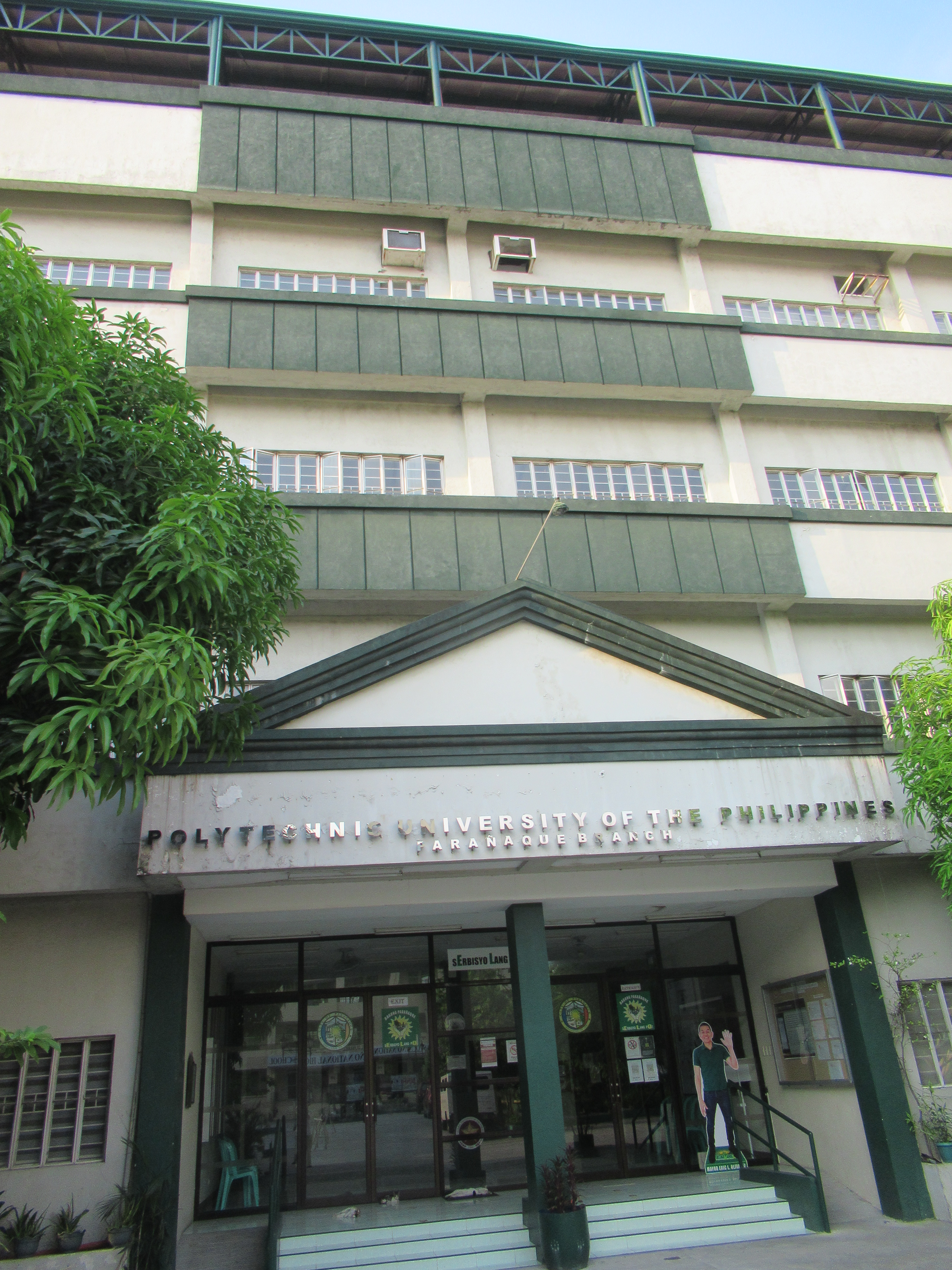
Polytechnic University of the Philippines Parañaque

=== Degree Courses ===
- Bachelor of Science in Computer Engineering
- Bachelor of Science in Hospitality Management
- Bachelor of Science in Information Technology
- Diploma in Office Management Technology

=== Diploma Courses ===
- Diploma in Computer Engineering Technology
- Diploma in Information Communication Technology
- Diploma in Office Management Technology
