= European International School Manila =

International school in Parañaque, Philippines

European International School, EIS
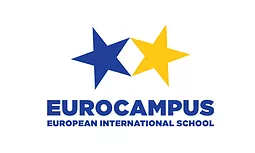

Location
- 75 Swaziland St., Better Living Subd., Parañaque, Philippines; 14°29′10″N 121°00′50″E

Information
- Former names: International Christian School
- Type: Non-profit, private, international school, a joint venture of the GESM and LFM
- Religious affiliations: secular, non-affiliated
- Established: 1992 (as Eurocampus); 2004 (as EIS)
- Session: 21 August to 30 June
- Headmaster: Christoph-Boris Frank (GESM); Eliette Baud (LFM)
- Gender: co-educational
- Enrolment: 750
- Campuses: Eurocampus Manila
- Colours: blue, white, yellow
- Mascot: EIS (Ice) Bears
- Website: www.eurocampus.ph

The European International School Manila is a joint venture of the German European School Manila (German: Deutsche Europäische Schule Manila) and the Lycée Français de Manille (English: French School of Manila). Its abbreviation is EIS. It is the first of seven "Eurocampus"-schools worldwide.

Both schools under EIS offer a full-day K-12 programme of international education to students of all languages, cultures, and nationalities. The Programme of LFM follows the French curriculum, GESM offers bilingual education for German and international certificates and diplomas.

== History ==
In January 1991, the French school in Manila, held an assembly to pursue the acquisition of the lots for Eurocampus in Parañaque. The German school association approved of this project in September 1991. In October 1991, the 2 hectar of Eurocampus were bought by the newly formed European Education Foundation Inc. (EEFI) at 50 million Philippine pesos.

In 1992, the Ambassador of France Olivier Gaussot, Alain Chancerelle, Louis-Paul Heussaff and Philippe Gauthier formed the board of EEFI, a non-profit association that owns Eurocampus and has a 10-member board of directors.

The management of Eurocampus is in the hands of the Joint Administrative Committee (JAC), which is the joint management committee for the 2 schools, composed of 10 voting members, including 5 from the LFM - and 5 from GESM.

Six non-voting members also attend JAC meetings, namely the directors of the French and German institutions, the two administrators of the LFM and GESM, and a representative from each embassy.

When Eurocampus was established in 1992, the British School Manila and the Dutch School Manila was also located on the so called Eurocampus, which was officially opened on 3 October 1992 by German Foreign Minister Klaus Kinkel, and his French colleague Georges Kiejman in the presence of Amelita Ramos and Armand Fabella. Manila was the first Eurocampus world-wide.

1997 the Joint School Conference (JSC) was created, a body to discuss Eurocampus-internal pedagogical questions or projects of the schools. The delegates of each school were the headmaster, one delegate of the school board, two teachers and one student. headmasters, and representatives of students and teachers, working on projects of cooperation.

In 2004, the European International School was conceptualized and therefore, the Eurocampus was renamed as EIS Eurocampus.

In its Mission statement, Eurocampus "promotes cultural awareness in the spirit of intercultural learning and understanding by embracing all professional, educational and human aspects of cooperation."

== Organization ==
The European Educational Foundation, Inc. is an association under Philippine law. It has ten members. It holds the ownership of the land and commonly financed buildings of the Eurocampus. Its statutes determine its purpose: "to cultivate, promote and develop the education and interests of the members of the European Community, particularly those of the two founding schools, the Lycée Français de Manille and the Deutsche Schule Manila".

== French School of Manila ==
The Lycée Français de Manille (English: French School of Manila), is an embassy school.

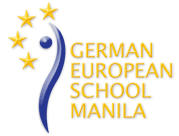
GESM logo

== German European School Manila ==
The German European School Manila is a German international school. It was first established as Jose-Rizal Schule in 1983. Renamed in 1992, as German School Manila. (German: Deutsche Schule Manila), when the Eurocampus was formed. In 2010, the DSM renamed to its present name, after having established an international section in 2006.

== Facilities ==
Both GESM and LFM share most of the facilities of the EIS like the football field, gym, swimming pools, library, and clinic/infirmary, the school mensa and transport services.

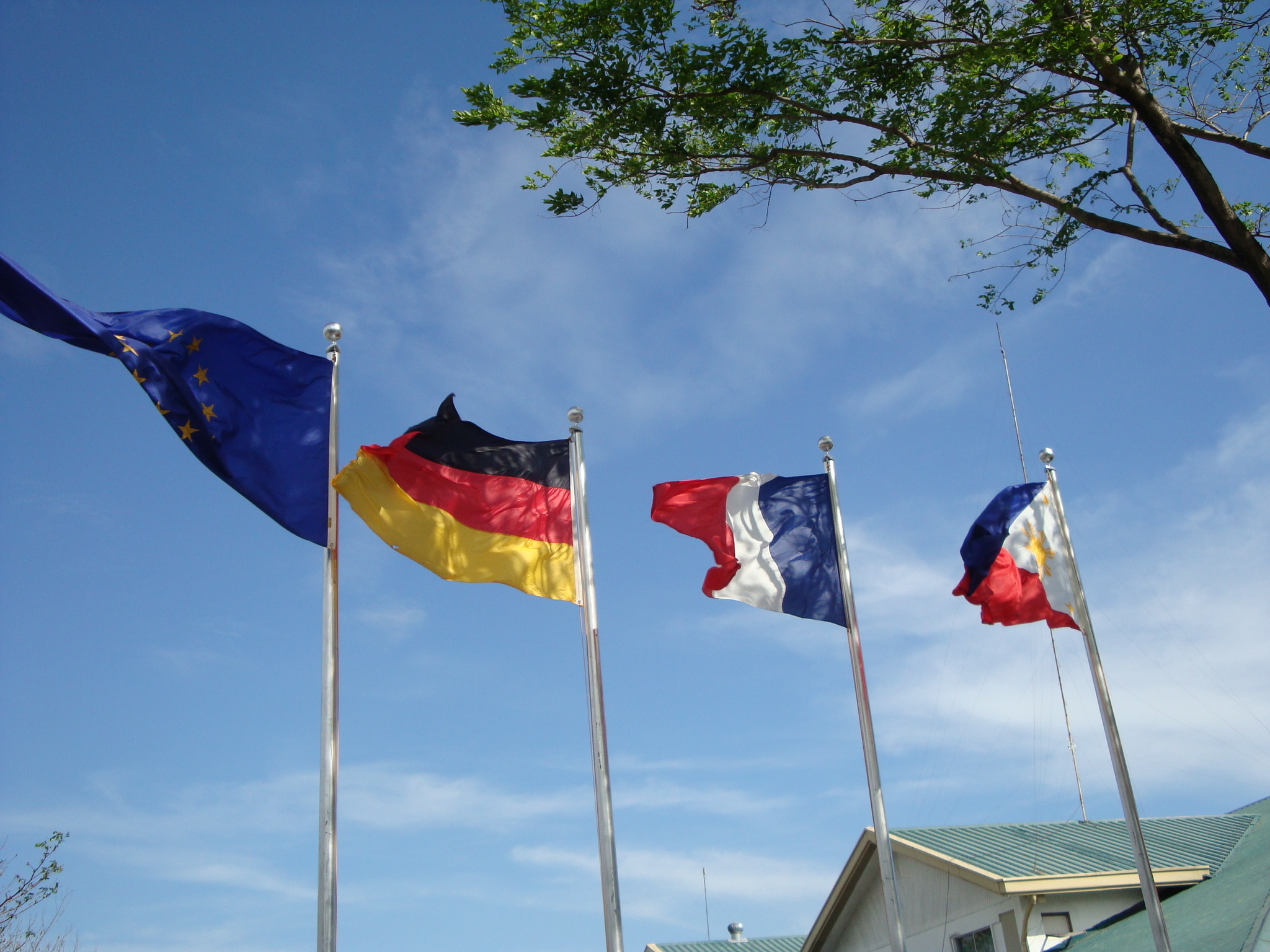
The flags of Germany, France, the Philippines, and the European Union hoisted at the EIS

== Accreditation ==
The two school offer an International Baccalaureate Diploma Programme on the German side, and the French Baccalaureat on the side of LFM. GESM is recognized by the German Embassy and German International Schools Abroad (German: Deutsche Auslandsschulen International). LFM is recognized by the French Embassy and Agency for French Education abroad (French: Agence pour l'Enseignement Français à l'Étranger).

== Quotation ==
“It really is the incarnation of our European project; of our European dream. It has always been said that French President Emmanuel Macron and German Chancellor Angela Merkel now are working together to try to give a new impulse to this European project. But here, we have to acknowledge that this project is [alive], you are a living example of what we can achieve when we are together, when we share, when we exchange, when we try to overcome our differences and understand ourselves better.” (Chargé d’Affaires Laurent Le Godec)

== See also ==
- German European School Manila
- Lycée Français de Manille
