= List of schools in Metro Manila =

This list of primary and secondary schools in Metro Manila is sorted by city and municipality. It includes both public and private primary and secondary schools that are currently in operation. According to the Department of Education, there are 827 public schools in Metro Manila as of 2022.

== See also ==
- List of international schools in Metro Manila
- List of universities and colleges in Metro Manila
