= Immaculate Heart of Mary College-Parañaque =

Roman Catholic college in Parañaque, Philippines

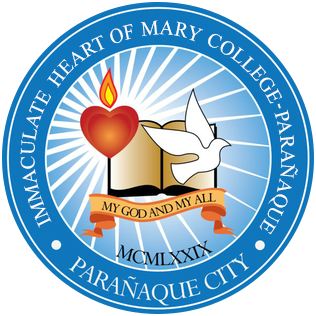
- Seal of Immaculate Heart of Mary College-Paranaque
- Former names: Immaculate Heart of Mary School; Immaculate Heart of Mary College
- Motto: "My God and My All"
- Type: Private Roman Catholic Non-profit Coeducational Basic and Higher education institution
- Established: June 1979; 47 years ago
- Religious affiliation: Roman Catholic (Franciscan Sisters of the Sacred Hearts)
- Academic affiliations: PAASCU
- President: Sr. Monica U. Navarro, SFSC
- Location: Saint Dominic Savio Street, Better Living Subdivision, City of Parañaque, Metro Manila, Philippines; 14°28′37″N 121°01′26″E
- Campus: Urban 2.5 hectares (6.2 acres)
- Alma Mater song: IHMC-P Hymn (Hail Holy Queen)
- Colors: White, Blue, Red
- Location in Metro Manila Location in Luzon Location in the Philippines

Immaculate Heart of Mary College-Parañaque (IHMC-P, formerly known as Immaculate Heart of Mary School; colloquially, "IMMA") is a Private, Roman Catholic, educational institution run by the Franciscan Sisters of the Sacred Hearts. It is located in Better Living Subdivision, Parañaque City.

== History ==
The institution was established in 1979 offering elementary education, then in 1983 it opened to its first group of high school students. The College Department was established in 2004. Admission is open to students of different religion and nationality.

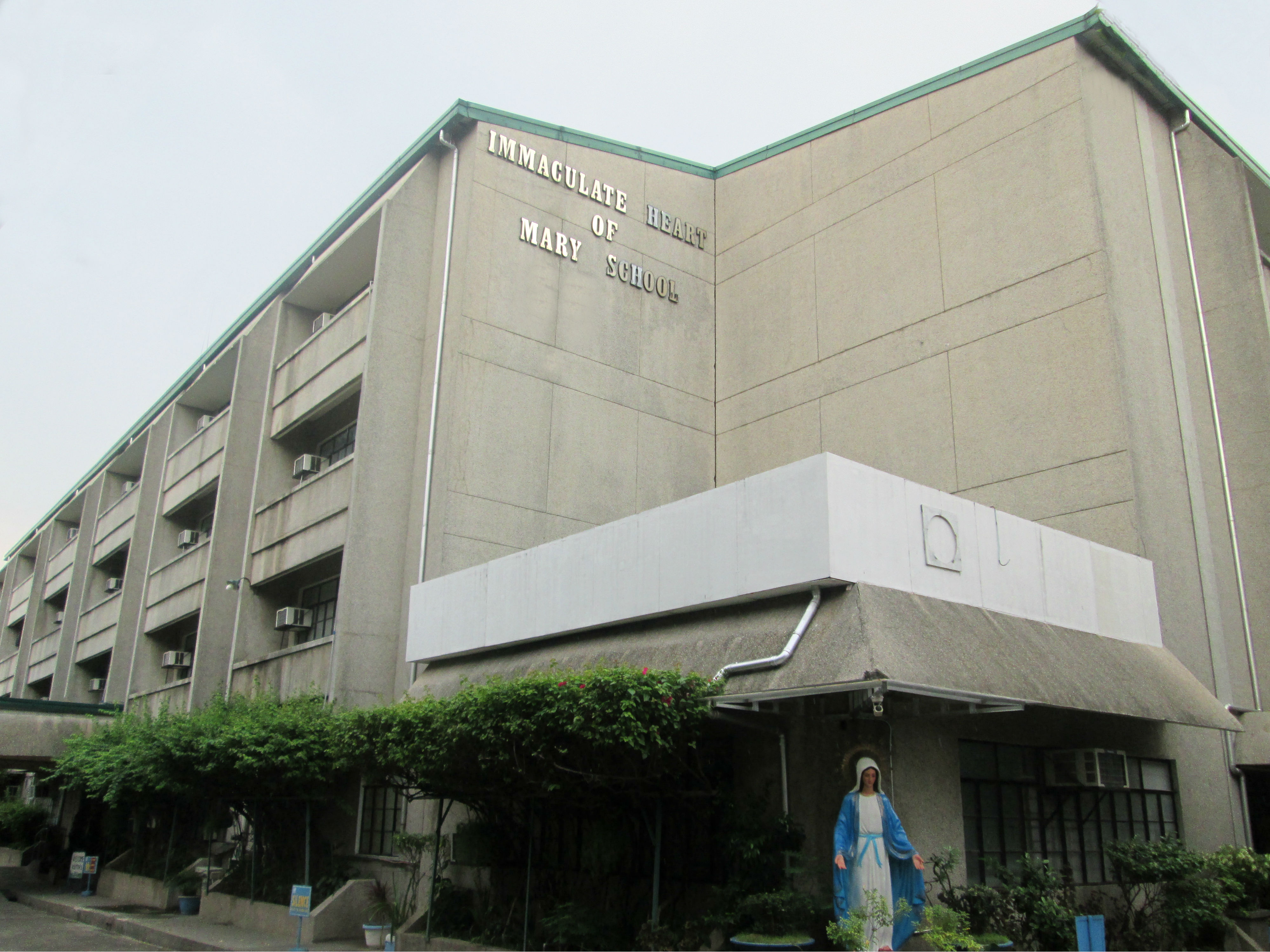
The Blessed Mother's Building, inaugurated 1985 by the Cardinal Sin, currently houses the grade school, the office of the president, grade school department office, faculty room and some classrooms

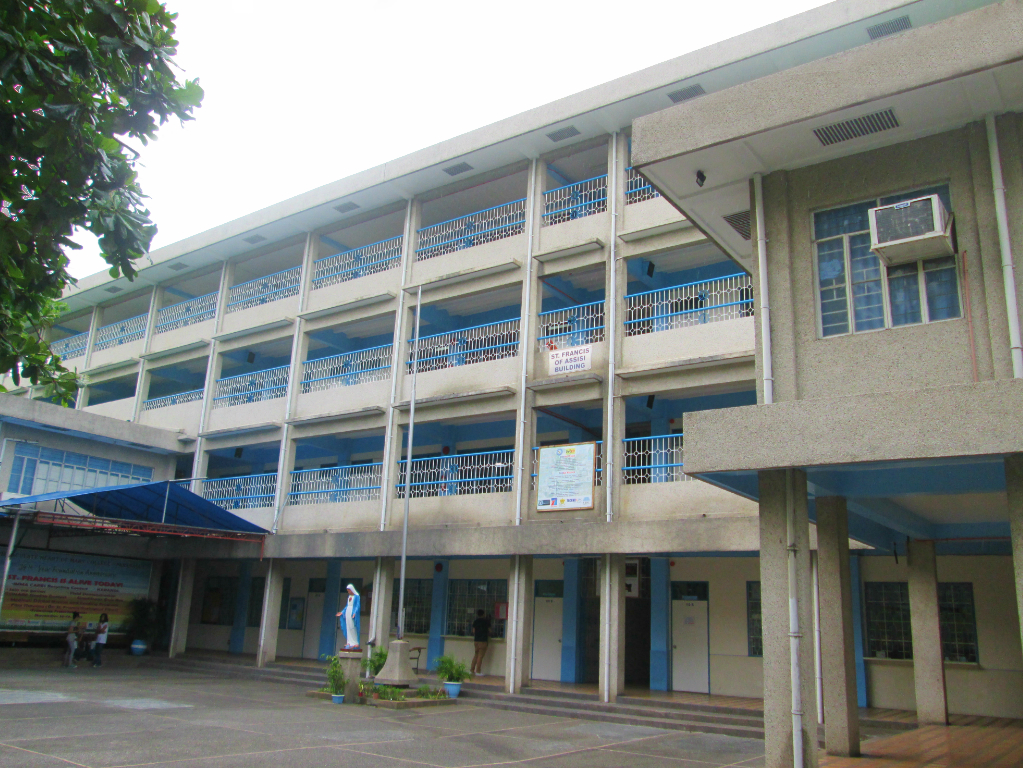
The St. Francis of Assisi Building, housing the junior high school, learning resource center, college department office, faculty room and some classrooms

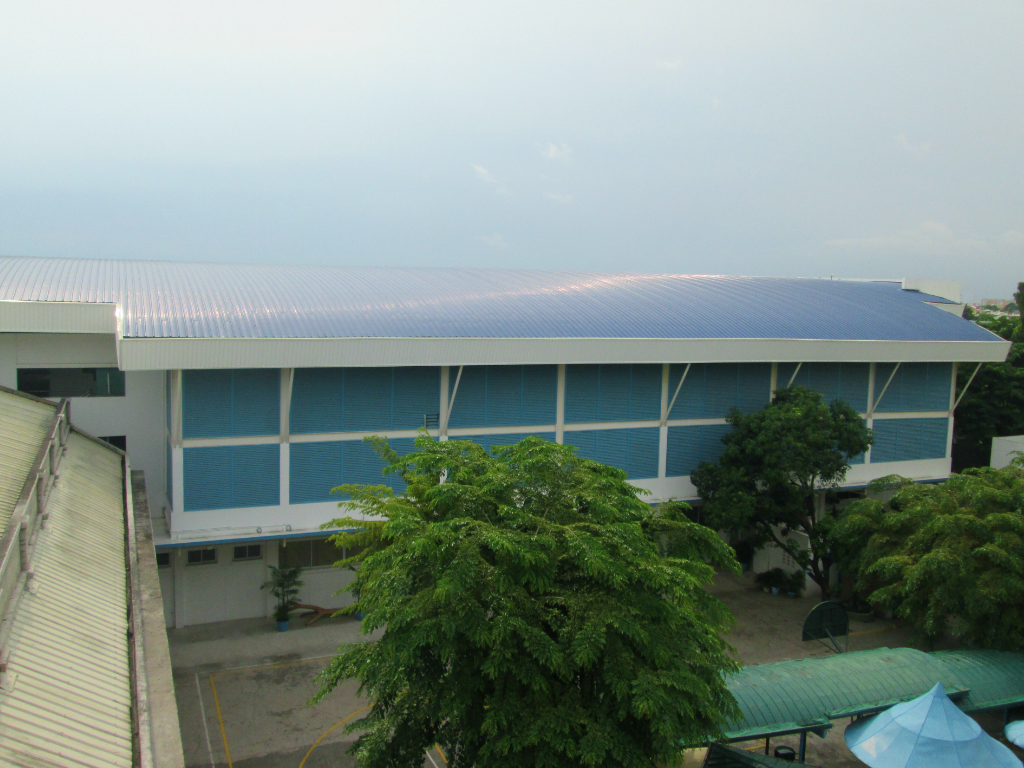
The Father Simpliciano Building that replaced the Old Gymnasium and Home Economics Building, that currently houses the new gymnasium, the senior high school, the libraries, senior high school Department office, faculty room and some classrooms
