= Deutsche Internationale Schule in Zagreb =

Coordinates: 45.8359°N 15.9934°E

- Zagreb; Croatia

Information
- Type: German international school
- Established: September 1, 2005
- Grades: Kindergarten, grundschule, and gymasium
- Age: 3 to 18
- Website: deutscheschule.hr

Deutsche Internationale Schule Zagreb (DISZ, Croatian: Njemačka međunarodna škola u Zagrebu) is a German international school in Zagreb, Croatia. It serves kindergarten, Grundschule, and Gymnasium leading up to Abitur.

== Structure ==
It is a part of the EuroCampus Zagreb, with the École française de Zagreb. The EuroCampus opened on September 1, 2005.

The school takes pupils from three years old to eighteen years old.
