= Deutsches Sprachdiplom Stufe I and II =

German language certification

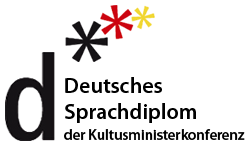

The Deutsches Sprachdiplom der Kultusministerkonferenz (engl.: German Language Certificate of the Education Ministers Conference) is an official German language certificate of the German education authorities and the Foreign Office (Germany) certifying levels of knowledge of the German language in schools worldwide. The program, originally intended to stimulate interest in German, has run since 1973 and, different from the equivalent certificates of the Goethe Institute, is meant for students at officially recognized schools abroad, either Diploma schools or German Schools Abroad (Deutsche Auslandsschulen). The program prepares the participants for a study in Germany in matters of language and cultural issues. It finishes with an exam and a certification on language competencies on level A2/B1 or B2/C1 of the Common European Framework of Reference for Languages. The certificate together with national school leaving examinations entitles foreign students to apply for university entry in Germany.

== Acknowledgement in Germany ==
Level A2/B1 of the Deutsches Sprachdiplom der Kultusministerkonferenz (DSD I) is considered by the responsible German authorities as proof that the pupil has reached a level of ability in German that is required for entry to a Studienkolleg in preparation for attending a university in Germany. Level B2/C1 of the Deutsches Sprachdiplom der Kultusministerkonferenz (DSD II) is considered proof that the graduates have reached a language level in German that is required to be able to directly start a study at a university in Germany. In order to start studying in Germany, students may need to fulfill additional requirements beyond language competencies which can be researched for each individual country in the official Database ANABIN.

== About the program ==
Currently there are about 51,000 students in over 65 countries participating in the exams each year. Most of the accredited schools for level A2/B1 are situated in Russia, Poland, the United States, China and Italy. Leading countries offering exams for level B2/C1 of the Deutsches Sprachdiplom der Kultusministerkonferenz are Russia, Poland, Romania, Croatia and Hungary. All together about 950 schools are accredited by the steering committee of the Deutsches Sprachdiplom. The steering committee 'Zentraler Ausschuss für das Deutsche Sprachdiplom' accounts for the quality of the language certificate. Its members are representatives of the German Foreign Office, the German Federal Office of Administration, the Central Agency for Schools Abroad and the States in Germany. The committee is headed by Mr. Thomas Mayer of Bavaria. The exams of the Deutsches Sprachdiplom der Kultusministerkonferenz are prepared by the German Federal Office of Administration the Central Agency for Schools Abroad (ZfA) in Cologne which also administers a network of advisors on German around the world.

== About the exam ==
Having learned German in school for several years, high school students can join either the exams on the level A2/B1 or on level B2/C1 depending on the accreditations of their school. All exams are free of charge, fixed dates for the exams are in December and March (Northern Hemisphere) and in August (Southern Hemisphere). Each candidate must be registered by the school and needs approval by the German side. The student is only allowed to take part twice on each level. The test comprises listening comprehension, reading comprehension, writing skills, and oral communication of the candidate. The written parts of the test are done in classes and the oral part individually in front of a commission. All four competencies must be completed with a certain score in order to obtain the diploma.

In order to offer exams, each school must be registered and accredited by the German institutions. Schools are permitted to register and offer the A2/B1-exams or the B2/C1-exams separately or both together. The German institutions offer support for each participating school consisting of inter alia personal support, training and taking over the chair of the examination committee by personnel from Germany.

=== Exam DSD I (A2/B1) ===
==== Reading Part ====
This section tests the candidate's reading comprehension by presenting several short (25-80 words) and long (100-300 words) pieces of writing followed by comprehension questions with simple filling (multiple choice, true/false, ticking, cloze texts). The reading part consists of five individual parts and lasts for 70 min (60 min working time + 10 min transfer time).

==== Listening Part ====
In this section, the candidate is presented with several recordings and asked to fill out comprehension questions regarding the selections played (multiple choice, true/false, ticking). The five individual parts of the listening section include short and simple dialogues of ca. 60 words, as well as descriptive monologues of ca. 450 words, and lasts for 50 min (40 min working time + 10 min transfer time).

==== Writing Part ====
In this section, the candidate is asked to prove their writing skills by tackling three central questions and a sample text. The writing part can be of two sorts, either an article or a letter to the editors of a newspaper. The theme can be anything from part-time jobs, pets to homework, reading, arriving late, etc. The working time for this section is 75 min.

==== Speaking Part ====
This section is divided in two parts and lasts for 15 min. The first part consists of a guided conversation where the candidate is prompted by the examiner, and the second part consists of a short presentation on a subject which you choose followed by answering questions on the presented subject.

=== Exam DSD II (B2/C1) ===
==== Reading Part ====
This section tests the candidate's reading comprehension by presenting five short (70-80 words) and three long (400-750 words) pieces of writing, followed by comprehension questions with simple filling (multiple choice, true/false, ticking, cloze texts). The reading part consists of five individual parts and lasts for 85 min (75 min working time + 10 min transfer time).

==== Listening Part ====
In this section, the candidate is presented with several recordings to test the listening comprehension and lasts for 50 min (40 min working time + 10 min transfer time). The three individual parts of the listening section include a dialogue of ca. 700 words, a monologue of ca. 700 words, and four audio sequences of ca. 100 words. The candidate is asked to fill out comprehension questions regarding the selections played (multiple choice, mapping).

==== Writing Part ====
The candidate is asked to write texts tackling central questions and sample texts. The working time for this section is 120 min. Before the writing exam, the candidate receives a single page with questions and another one with a text and a graph. The candidate should write an introduction (ca. 2 sentences), summarize the text, describe the graph, write advantages and disadvantages of the topic (for example top level sport) and present their own opinion on the topic.

==== Speaking Part ====
This section is divided in two parts and lasts for 40 min (20 min preparation time + 20 min exam time). In the first part, the candidate is expected to deliver a monologue on given keywords and to answer relevant questions in a free and spontaneous fashion. The second part consists of a monologue delivered on a chosen subject, followed by discussion of the presented subject.

== Scoring ==
Each of the four test sections (reading, listening, writing, and speaking) accounts for 25% of the exam. Per tested section, it is possible to acquire a maximum of 24 points, and, depending on the acquired points in each section, the language proficiency level of said section is decided. The DSD II is presented to the candidate if they reached B2-level or higher in all tested sections. Scores above B2 are presented as C1-scores on the diploma. The DSD I is presented to the candidate if they reached in all tested sections B1-level or higher of language proficiency in German. Below DSD I, a DSD A2 is presented to the candidate if they reached at least or higher A2-level of language proficiency in German in all tested sections.
