= Daughters of Jesus (Spain) =

Spanish Roman Catholic congregation of religious sisters

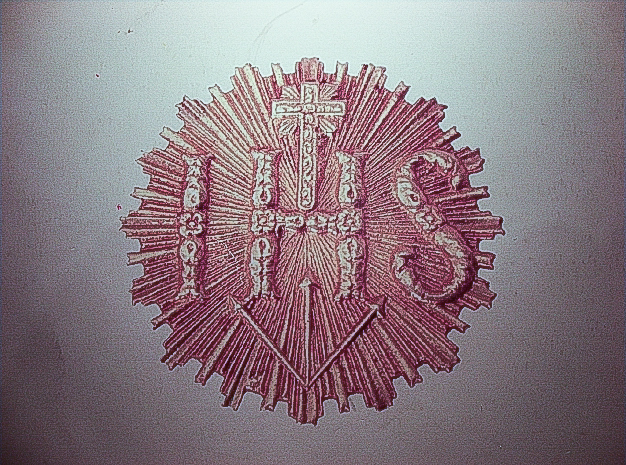
- Abbreviation: Filiae Iesu (F.I.)
- Formation: 8 December 1871
- Type: Catholic religious institute
- Headquarters: Rome, Italy
- Key people: St. Candida Maria of Jesus, F.I. – foundress
- Website: www.hijasdejesus.org

The Daughters of Jesus (Latin: Filiae Iesu, abbreviated as F.I., Spanish: Hijas de Jesús) is a Roman Catholic congregation of Religious Sisters founded on 8 December 1871 in Salamanca, Spain, by Candida Maria of Jesus (1845–1912). Known as Jesuitinas (or Jesuitesses) in Spain, their work is primarily educational, and includes the administration of schools and colleges. The congregation is devoted to education in all its forms, and is inspired by the spirituality of Ignatius of Loyola, also offering the Ignatian Spiritual Exercises to women and girls.

== History ==
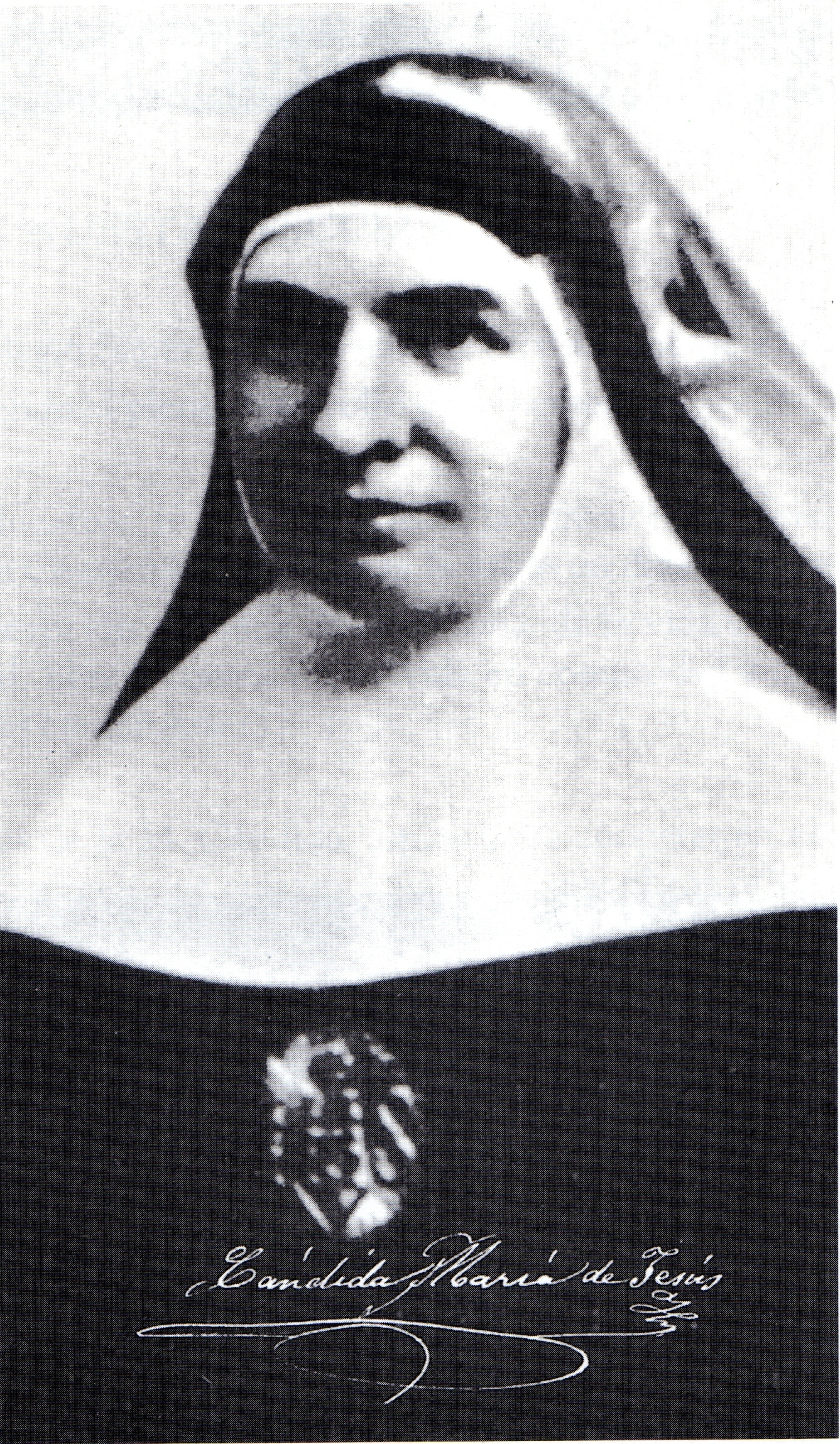
Mother Candida Maria of Jesus

Candida, born Juana Josefa Cipitria y Barriola in the Basque town of Andoain, Gipuzkoa, went to Salamanca as a young girl to help support her family. She worked as a servant in various homes. Cipitria was deeply affected, however, by the depth of poverty she saw in a society undergoing the social effects of the Industrial Revolution in her country. She would spend whatever free time she had helping the poor, even at the risk of losing her employment.

Seeking to find God's will for herself in this, Cipitria said she was led to founding this congregation through a vision of Jesus she experienced on Good Friday of 1869. Two years later, together with five other women, the congregation was established, at which time the foundress, like her companions, took the religious name by which she is now known. They were assisted in this by Jesuit priest Miguel José Herranz.

The congregation expanded rapidly in Spain, receiving approval by Pope Leo XIII in 1902. Within ten years, the foundress was able to begin their first foreign mission in Brazil, founding a school there. This was later followed by a mission to China in 1931, and to the Philippines in 1932.

== Current status ==
Since then, the sisters of the congregation have continued their work of evangelization through education, and today can be found in 17 countries. In addition to Spain they include: Argentina, Bolivia, Brazil, Colombia, Cuba, China, the Dominican Republic, Italy, Japan, Mozambique, Philippines, Taiwan and Venezuela.

The foundress was beatified in 1996 by Pope John Paul II, along with another early member of the congregation, María Antonia Bandrés Elósegui. Candida was canonized by Pope Benedict XVI in 2010.
