= British School Manila =

Private international school in the Philippines

The British School Manila

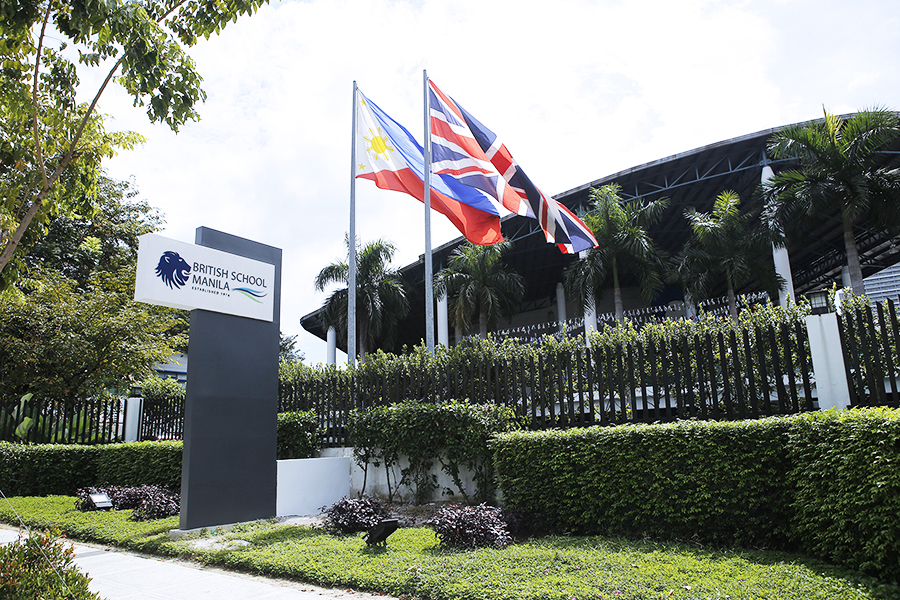
- British School Manila facade.

Location
- Bonifacio Global City, Taguig; Philippines; 14.556°N 121.0565°E

Information
- Other name: BSM
- Type: Not-for-profit; Private international; British school
- Established: 1976; 50 years ago
- Head of School: Martin van der Linde
- Enrolment: 965 students from 54 countries
- Campus type: Urban (University Parkway)
- Houses: Mindanao; Visayas; Luzon
- Colours: Blue; Teal; Green
- Athletics conference: BSM Sports, FOBISIA
- Mascot: Lion
- Nickname: BSM Lions
- Accreditations: Council of International Schools; Western Association of Schools and Colleges; International Baccalaureate Organization; Duke of Edinburgh's Award
- Newspaper: Winston
- Affiliations: Federation of British International Schools in Asia; Council of British International Schools; East Asia Regional Council of Schools
- Website: www.britishschoolmanila.org

The British School Manila (abbreviated as BSM) is a private, non-profit international school in the Philippines. The school follows the National Curriculum for England for children in early years to GCSE, adapted for the international environment and its host country and the IB Diploma. BSM students are prepared for end of Key Stage tests in Primary, GCSEs at 16, the IB Diploma at 18 and for life beyond school and university.

== History ==
The British School Manila was founded in 1976, and it has grown from 2 classrooms and 32 students to over 960 students, representing 54 nationalities.

The school first operated in the old Union Church, then in 1980 moved to Merville, Parañaque. In September 2001, BSM relocated to purpose-built premises in Bonifacio Global City, in Metro Manila, Philippines, next to the International School Manila and the Manila Japanese School.

In 2016 the Senate of the Philippines discussed a case brought against the school regarding a student challenged for plagiarism in 2015. The Philippine Department of Justice determined there was no case to answer. The Philippine Department of Education also investigated and, in 2018, instructed BSM to obtain a new legislative franchise to operate within that academic year. The school, having exceeded all regulatory requirements, was formally recognised as an "Educational Institution of International Character" in Republic Act 11218 in July 2018.

In 2021, the school, working in collaboration with the Philippine Department of Education, was one of the first in the Philippines to be granted permission to start hybrid learning and, subsequently, to return to face-to-face learning amidst the COVID-19 pandemic.

== Campus ==
With the exception of the Main Building and Learning Resource Centre, all of the other buildings have been named after Philippine locations, people and events (Anilao, Boracay, Cebu, Dinagyang, El Nido, Fiesta, Rizal). The average class size is 22 students.

Facilities include an 8-lane 25-meter swimming pool, an on-campus 95x45m field using artificial turf for higher playability for tennis, football, cricket and multi-use, a grass sports field that is 100x50m for rugby, football and athletics, math rooms, well-equipped science laboratories and several multipurpose rooms. It also includes two cafeterias, one for Primary students and one for Senior students.

== Creative Arts Centre ==
BSM's Creative Arts Centre, opened just prior to the COVID-19 pandemic, is designed for lessons in the visual and performing arts subjects. The building features four levels, along with a Coffee Bean and Tea Leaf, with the first level consisting of Drama and Dance spaces, the second level hosting Music and the third level containing studios for Art and the kiln. The CAC also incorporates a climbing wall, open-air auditorium and Bayanihan, a multi-purpose theatre space and auditorium.

== Curriculum ==
BSM teaches an adapted form of the National Curriculum of England in EYFS and Years 1–9. This is followed in Years 10 & 11 with a range of Edexcel and Cambridge (I)GCSE courses. In Year 12 and 13, students enter the IB Diploma programme. The school also offers a Service Learning programme and more than 200 After School Activities (ASA) catering for different student interests to explore and develop sporting, creative, academic and artistic interests.

== Service and Sustainability Activities ==
Every year, students at BSM take part in service learning activities as part of the curriculum. The school designed many of these activities, including the annual Make A Difference (MAD) Week with Make a Difference (MAD) Travel, a platform for education, environmental restoration and supporting local economies, with the aim of creating longer term, mutually beneficial relationships. Service and sustainability are also part of the school's after-school activities with students advocating, supporting and raising funds for service partners including Best Buddies International.

== Organisation and leadership ==
The British School is governed by a board with twelve members, four elected and eight appointed. The BSM Board of Governors is overseen by a five-member Council of Trustees which includes members of the British Embassy and the Australian Embassy. Day to day BSM operations are led by the Head of School, supported by the Chief Operating Officer, the Head of Primary School and the Head of Senior School. The Leadership team is responsible for curriculum, teaching and learning, operations, staffing, budgets and facilities.

== BSM Taguig Scholarship Programme ==
The British School Manila Taguig Scholarship Programme is a long running partnership between the school and the Department for Education Taguig-Pateros. Scholars, who are academically strong but financially disadvantaged, are selected from a list endorsed by the Department for Education Taguig-Pateros. BSM fully funds their higher education and provides pastoral support and other resources, such as leadership development and skills workshops.

== Department of Energy Collaboration & Solar Panels ==
BSM signed a Memorandum of Understanding with the Department of Energy in September 2023 where the two organisations agreed to collaborate in support of Republic Act RA11285, the Energy Efficient and Conservation Act. The collaboration includes the Department of energy supporting audits to make the campus more efficient and the school supporting curriculum development and the creation of educational resources for public schools to support teaching about energy efficiency and how to implement it in daily life. As announced at the signing, the school launched the first phase of its solar plant, capable of generating 99.76 kwp, in May 2024. The school received a Special Recognition Award for Energy Efficiency and Conservation at the 5th Energy Efficiency Awards, held in December 2025.

== Associations and Accreditations ==
The British School Manila was a FOBISIA (Federation of British International Schools in Asia) founding school and continues to be involved and contribute significantly, regularly hosting and attending FOBISIA events. For Sports FOBISIA, these events differ based on the level of schooling; primary and secondary. The school is accredited by the Council of International Schools, Western Association of Schools and Colleges and is the only accredited member of the Council of British International Schools (COBIS) in the Philippines.

== See also ==
- Philippines–United Kingdom relations
- Manila Japanese School
- International School Manila
