= French School of Manila =

- Lycée Français de Manille; Liseo Pranses ng Maynila
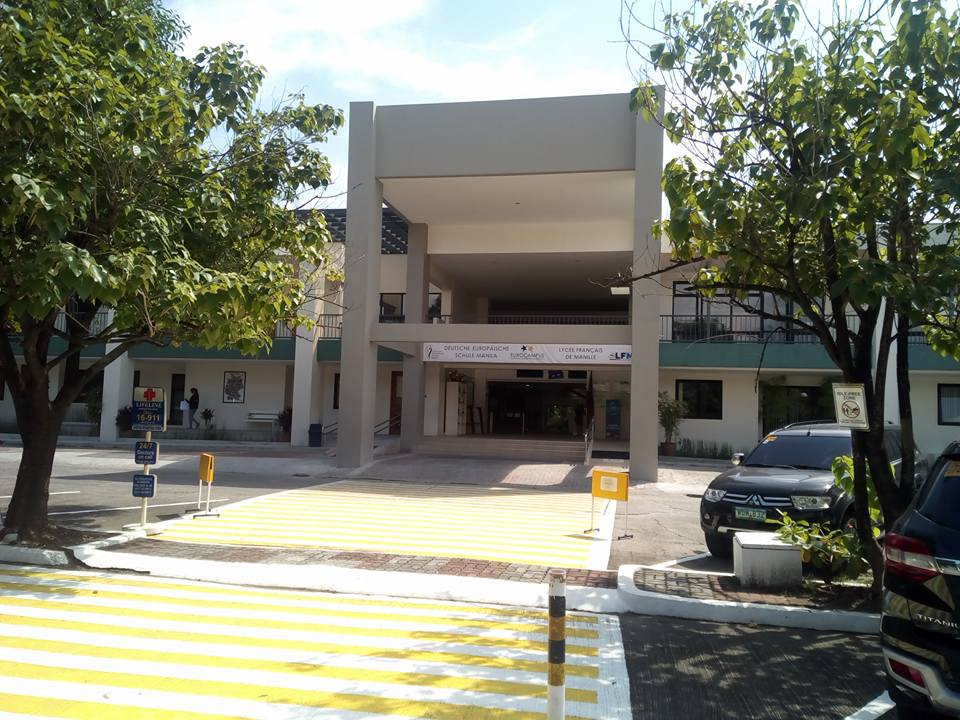
- Entrance of German and French School in Manila (European International School)

Location
- 75 Swaziland St., Better Living Subd., Parañaque, Metro Manila, Philippines
- Coordinates: 14°29′12″N 121°00′53″E

Information
- Type: French International School
- Established: 1973; 53 years ago
- Headmaster: Eliette Baud
- Colours: blue, white, red, yellow
- Website: www.lfmanille.ph

The Lycée Français de Manille (English: French School of Manila) is an international school in Parañaque, Metro Manila, Philippines. Offering the curriculum and learning culture of France, it is open to students of all nations and languages. According to its pedagogical programme, LFM offers an education based on the values of world citizenship.

It is located on the joint campus of European International School (also called Eurocampus) in Better Living, Parañaque, Metro Manila, Philippines. Their partner school is the German European School Manila (GESM).

Accredited by the Department of Education, Eurocampus is the second home of more than 400 families of around 50 nationalities. It offers French, German and international curricula and education to almost 700 students from Maternelle or Early Years to grade 12.

== History ==
Formerly called French School of Manila, The Lycée Francais de Manille (LFM) was founded in 1973 in Metro Manila.

The Eurocampus project was born in 1992 under the leadership of several French personalities in the Philippines: Olivier Gaussot, Ambassador of France, Alain Chancerelle, Louis-Paul Heussaff and Philippe Gauthier. They formed the group of founding members of this ambitious Franco-German project, the first in the world.

== Eurocampus ==
The French High School in Manila (LFM) and the German European School Manila (GESM) are two partner schools, united within the Eurocampus, and jointly using the buildings and services. The courses are independent, each school being attached to the respective supervisory authority for each of the two institutions, but each day cooperating on mutual agreements.

The services provided by EIS and LFM, are catering in the school mensa, school transport, aula, gymnasium, swimming pool, sports grounds, school clinic, library (Documentation and Information Centre), playground, laboratories.

== Quotation ==
“It really is the incarnation of our European project; of our European dream. It has always been said that French President Emmanuel Macron and German Chancellor Angela Merkel now are working together to try to give a new impulse to this European project. But here, we have to acknowledge that this project is [alive], you are a living example of what we can achieve when we are together, when we share, when we exchange, when we try to overcome our differences and understand ourselves better.” (Chargé d’Affaires Laurent Le Godec)
