= Manila Japanese School =

- マニラ日本人学校; Paaralang Haponesa sa Maynila

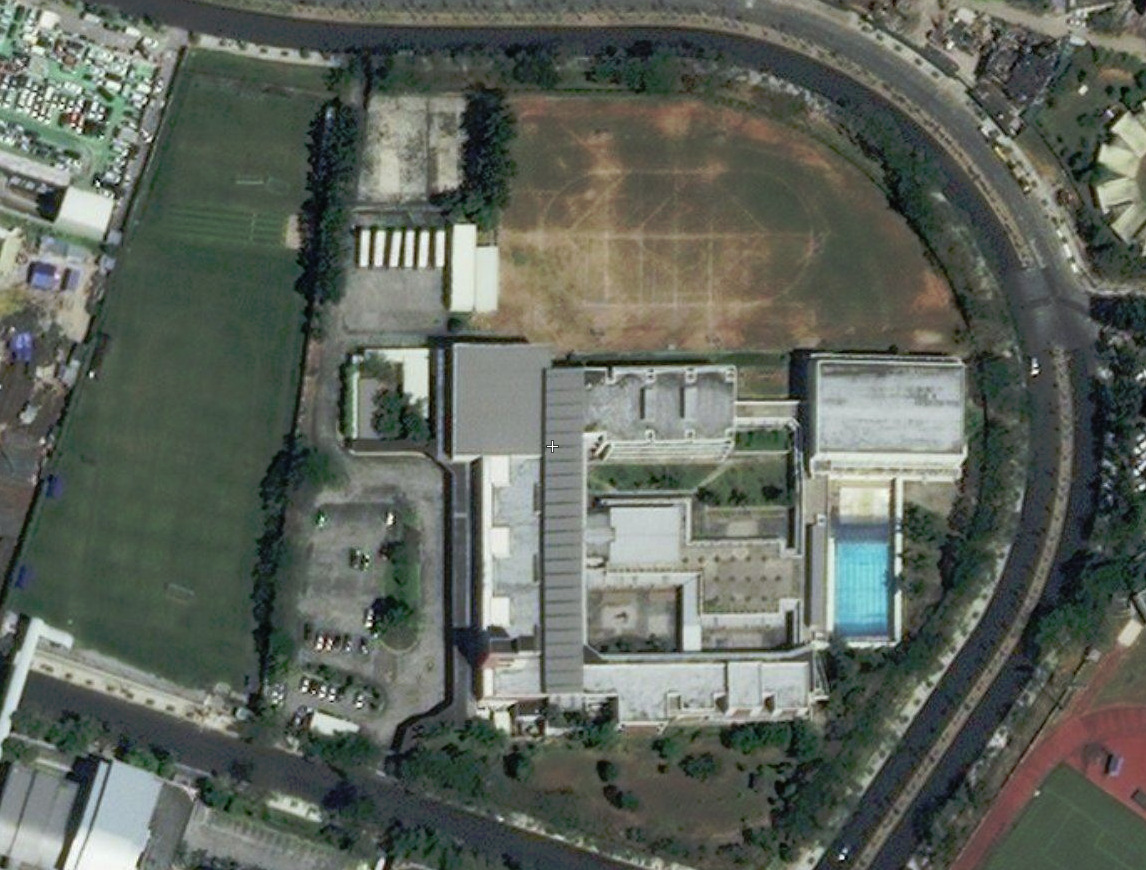

Location
- University Parkway, Bonifacio Global City, Taguig, Metro Manila, Philippines; 14°33′24.6″N 121°3′28.7″E

Information
- Type: Private, international school
- Established: 1968
- Website: www.mjs.ph

The Manila Japanese School (マニラ日本人学校, Manira Nihonjin Gakkō), is a Japanese school located at the Bonifacio Global City in Taguig, Philippines. It caters mainly to Japanese students who are residing in the Metro Manila area.

== Location ==
Its first location was in Manila. After 10 years, it moved to Parañaque, where they stayed for almost 23 years. Finally, MJS moved to the University Parkway, Bonifacio Global City adjacent to British School Manila, International School Manila, Market! Market!, and Serendra.

It is administratively attached to the Embassy of Japan, Manila.

== See also ==
Japan–Philippines relations
