= Candida Maria of Jesus =

Spanish nun and saint (1845–1912)

Saint Cándida María de Jesús
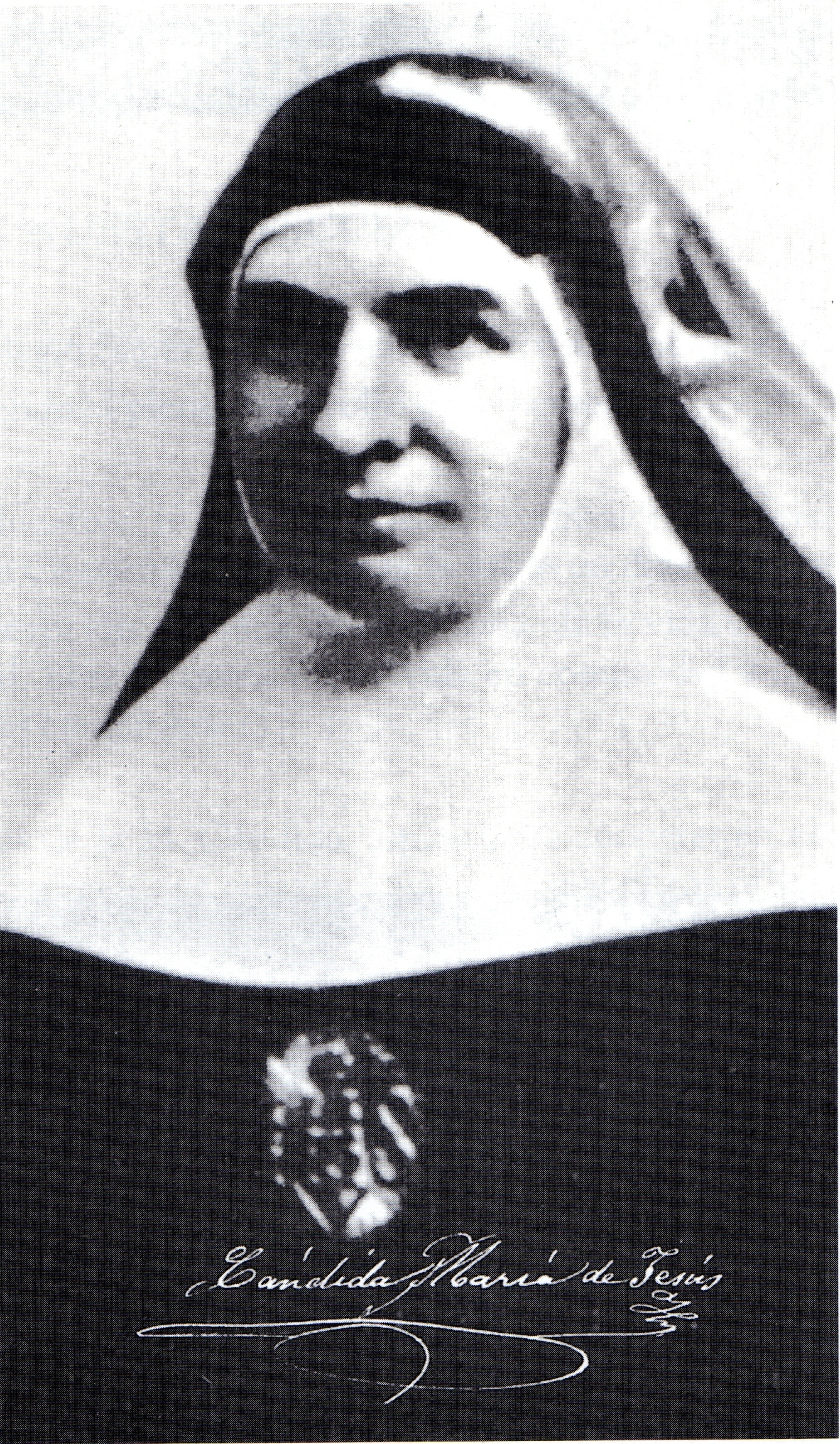
- Born: 31 May 1845; Andoáin, Gipúzkoa, Kingdom of Spain
- Died: 9 August 1912 (aged 67); Salamanca, Kingdom of Spain
- Venerated in: Catholic Church
- Beatified: 12 May 1996, Saint Peter's Square, Vatican City by Pope John Paul II
- Canonized: 17 October 2010, Saint Peter's Square, Vatican City by Pope Benedict XVI
- Feast: 9 August
- Attributes: Religious habit
- Patronage: Daughters of Jesus (also known as Hijas De Jesus); Educators

Cándida María de Jesús (31 May 1845 – 9 August 1912), born in Andoain, as Juana Josefa Cipitria y Barriola, was a Spanish nun and the founder of the Daughters of Jesus. The order – founded in 1871 – was under Jesuit direction from her spiritual director and was involved with the education of children in Salamanca though expanded during her lifetime.

Barriola was canonized as a saint on 17 October 2010.

== Life ==
Juana Josefa Cipitria y Barriola was born on May 31, 1845, in Berrospe, Andoain, as the eldest of seven children to the weavers Juan Miguel Cipitria and María Jesús Barriola. Her father was a weaver. Rather than attend school she helped look after her siblings because she was the eldest child. She received her Confirmation on 5 August 1848 and made her First Communion in 1855.

At a young age, she went to Burgos to help support the household and worked as a domestic servant in various homes. Barriola was affected to a great degree from the depth of the poor conditions that she witnessed in a place undergoing the social effects of the Industrial Revolution in her native land.

The Jesuit priest Miguel José Herranz advised her on her path ahead and at his advice started a number of charitable and educations programs; the two met in Valladolid in 1868. Barriola believed that she experienced a vision of Jesus Christ on 26 March 1869 on Good Friday. On April 2, 1869, she received the inspiration to found a Congregation with the name Hijas de Jesus. On 8 December 1871 – alongside five companions – she founded the Daughters of Jesus and assumed the religious name: "Cándida María de Jesús".

She founded the congregation for the education of children and the advancement of the women in Salamanca. It received diocesan approval from the Bishop of Salamanca on 3 April 1873. On 8 December 1873 she made her solemn profession.

Barriola based her spiritual principles and practices on the Spiritual Exercises of Ignatius Loyola. Herranz collaborated with her as she wrote the constitutions for the order which received the decree of praise from Pope Leo XIII in 1902; full papal approval came from Pope Pius X after her death in 1913. Barriola was a contemplative religious who spent long hours before the tabernacle where she became serene even in trials and suffering. Her motto for life was: "I am for God alone". Barriola died in 1912.

In October 1911, the first Hijas de Jesus left for Brazil. They arrived in the Philippines in 1932. In 2005 her order had 1116 religious in 114 houses in countries.

== Canonization ==
The informative phase for the beatification process spanned in Salamanca from 17 June 1942 until 9 July 1957; all of her spiritual writings received theological approval on 25 October 1961. The formal introduction to the cause came on 22 September 1978 under Pope John Paul I and she became titled as a Servant of God. Theologians approved the Positio on 12 March 1993 as did the C.C.S. on 22 June 1993; the confirmation of her heroic virtue allowed Pope John Paul II to title her as Venerable on 6 July 1993.

The miracle for beatification was investigated in Spain and received C.C.S. validation on 17 December 1983; the medical experts approved it on 22 June 1994 as did theologians on 28 October 1994 and the C.C.S. on 10 January 1995. John Paul II approved this miracle on 6 April 1995 and beatified the late religious on 12 May 1996 in Saint Peter's Square.

Another miracle needed for her to become a saint was investigated again in Spain and it received C.C.S. validation on 10 June 2005 before medical experts approved it on 25 September 2008. Theologians likewise approved this miracle on 7 March 2009 as did the C.C.S. on 16 June 2009. Pope Benedict XVI approved this miracle on 3 July 2009 and canonized her as a saint on 17 October 2010.
