= Sucat =

Sucat may refer to:

- Sucat, Muntinlupa, a barangay in Muntinlupa, Philippines
- Sucat People's Park, a park in Muntinlupa, Philippines
- Sucat station, a Philippine National Railways and North–South Commuter Railway station
- Sucat Thermal Power Plant, a power plant in Muntinlupa, Philippines
- Dr. Santos Avenue, a major road in Metro Manila, formerly and still commonly referred to as Sucat Road
