= San Dionisio, Parañaque =

Barangay in Parañaque, Metro Manila, Philippines

San Dionisio
- Barangay
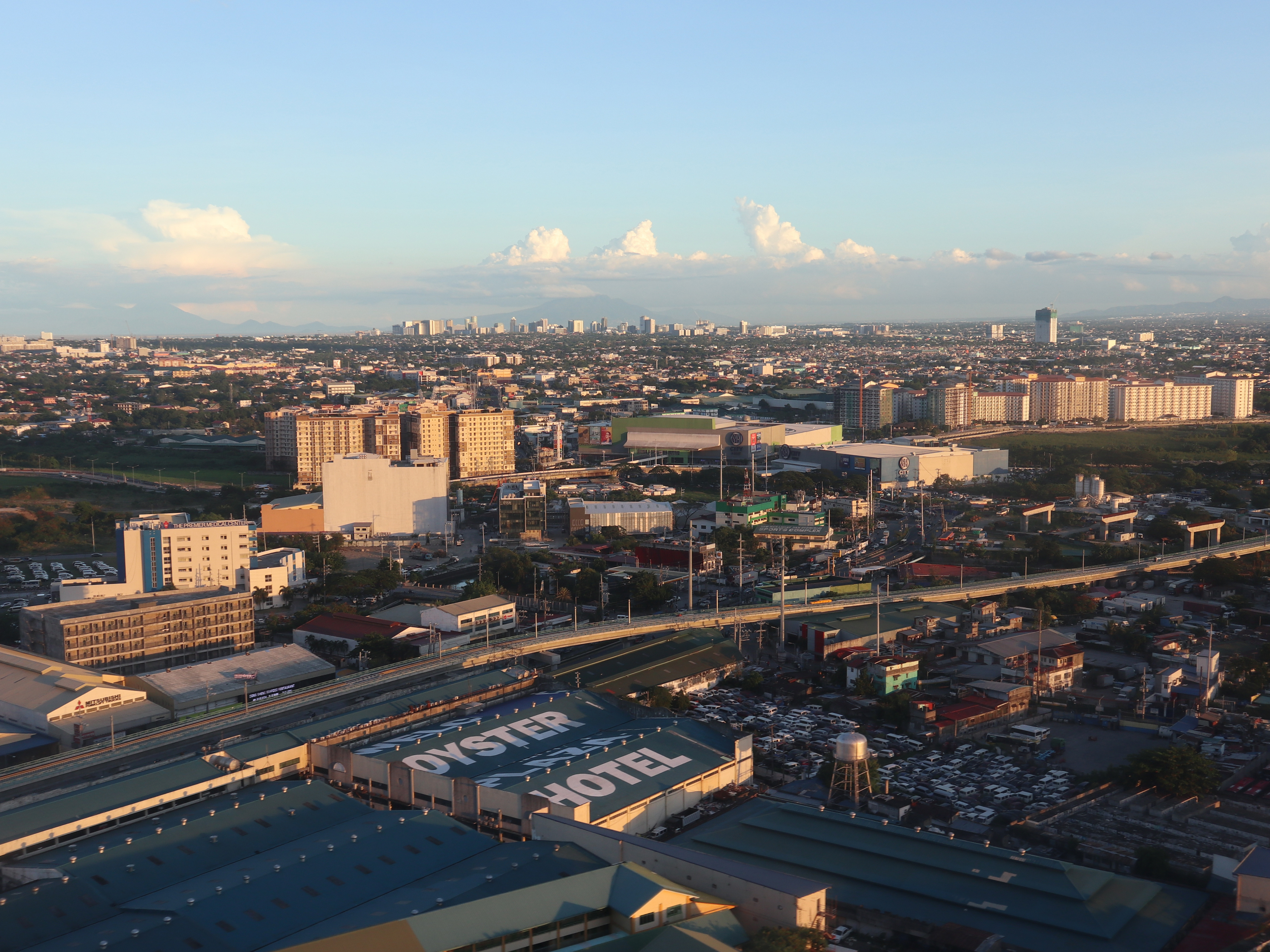
- Aerial view of San Dionisio

- Location within Metro Manila
- Coordinates: 14°29′2″N 120°59′33″E
- Country: Philippines
- Region: Metro Manila
- City: Parañaque
- Congressional districts: Part of the 1st district of Parañaque
- Named for: Denis of Paris

Government
  - Barangay Chairman: Evangeline L. Olivarez

Area
  - Total: 6.6256 km^{2} (2.5582 sq mi)

Population (2024)
  - Total: 69,550
  - Density: 10,500/km^{2} (27,190/sq mi)
- ZIP code: 1700
- Area code: 2

San Dionisio is an administrative division in southern Metro Manila, Philippines. It is a barangay at the southwestern edge of Parañaque and north of its border with Manuyo, Las Piñas. The barangay is centered on the westernmost section of Dr. Santos Avenue (formerly Sucat Road) where it veers north and parallels Elpidio Quirino Avenue (former Calle Real) with De Leon Street and Aldana Avenue forming its boundaries with La Huerta and Manuyo Uno respectively. It extends to the east along the San Dionisio River-Villanueva Creek by barangay Moonwalk to the north and along Balong Creek by Manuyo Dos, Las Piñas to the south towards its border with San Isidro. San Dionisio includes a large swath of the C-5 Road South Extension properties in Parañaque including the Amvel Business Park, Avida Sucat and SM City Sucat sites, the Irasan Complex logistics hub, and as well as the area surrounding the Evacom Plaza. It also covers a significant portion of the reclaimed Freedom and Long Islands in the Las Piñas–Parañaque Critical Habitat and Ecotourism Area.

San Dionisio is the second largest barangay in Parañaque in terms of land area and the third largest in terms of population. It is often mistakenly referred to as Sucat being the location of SM City Sucat shopping mall on the former Sucat Road. This erroneous reference is also applied to the other barangays traversed by Sucat Road. Sucat, however, is a barangay of Muntinlupa located at the opposite end of Sucat Road by the South Luzon Expressway. As of the 2024 census, San Dionisio had a population of 69,550.

== History ==
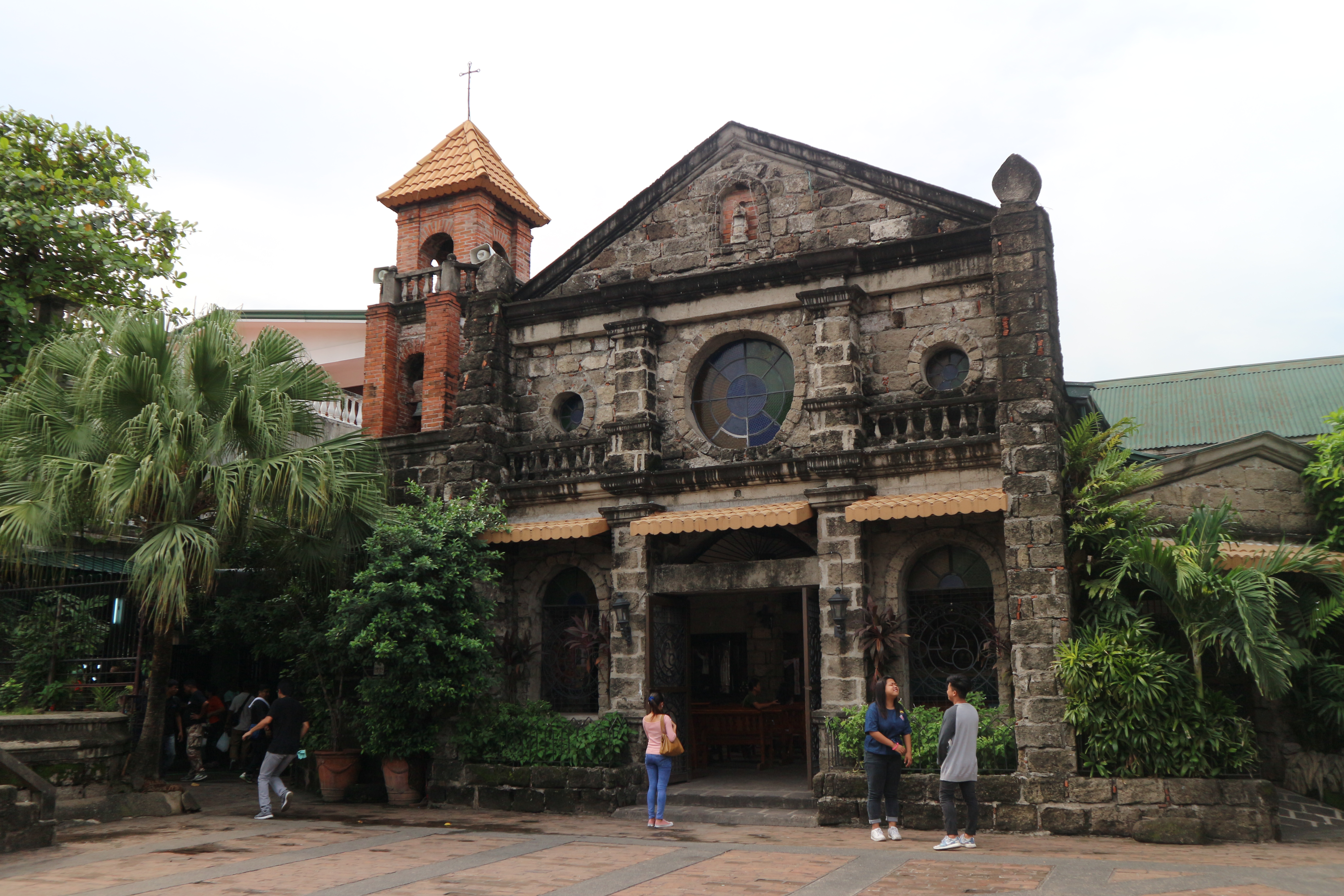
San Dionisio chapel

The history of San Dionisio is tied to the establishment of its namesake visita or chapel south of La Huerta. The visita was named after its patron, Saint Denis, whose headless image is enshrined in the brick stone chapel on Elpidio Quirino Avenue (formerly Calle Real), which was originally a wooden chapel built in 1640. Tata Dune, as the saint is fondly called by residents and devotees, is also the patron saint of Paris and all of France who was martyred by means of being beheaded by a sword for his Christian faith. Community life revolved around religious events during the Colonial Period when residents also engaged in traditional industries such as fishing, saltmaking and embroidery. This changed with the development of gated communities and expansion of Nichols Field into a civil international airport in the mid-21st century.

In 1971, San Dionisio became home to the new seat of the Parañaque municipal government, when it was transferred from La Huerta to the new municipal hall in San Antonio Valley Subdivision, which was then part of the barangay. On April 3, 1978, three new barangays were formed out of San Dionisio. The gated communities of BF Homes, Goodwill Phase II, Irene-ville, Jackielou Subdivision, Santa Rita Village and Teoville were carved out to form the new barangay of B.F. Homes. In the same year, Clarmen Village, Lopez Village, Parañaque Green Heights, Salvador Estate, Villa Mendoza, and a small portion of San Antonio Valley were also carved out to form a new barangay named San Isidro. The rest of San Antonio Valley, Barangay Village, Fourth Estate Subdivision, and Mon El Subdivision were also separated to form the new barangay of San Antonio.

The barangay lends its name to one of the oldest and successful cooperatives in the country, the San Dionisio Credit Cooperative.

In July 2026, San Dionisio officially expanded its boundary westward into the Freedom and Long Islands in the Las Piñas–Parañaque Critical Habitat and Ecotourism Area, after voters ratified City Ordinance No. 2023-19 that implements a straight-line boundary approach.

== Demographics ==
Year	Population
2007	60,175
2010	60,951
2015	63,506
2020	72,522
2024	69,550

== Culture ==
An annual street drama performance of Moros y cristianos is staged at the plaza of the San Dionisio Chapel on the former Calle Real in May. This tradition, commonly known as moro-moro or comedia (Filipino: komedya), dates back to the Spanish colonial period and is currently organized by the San Dionisio Cultural Society and played by the Komedya ng San Dionisio troop founded in 1962. The barangay also participates in the Sunduan festival of La Huerta and celebrates its annual patron saint's day in September.

== Education ==
San Dionisio hosts the main campus of Parañaque National High School. It is also the location of the following institutions:

- AMA University Parañaque Campus
- College of Divine Wisdom
- Escuela de San Dionisio
- Infotech College Institute of Arts and Sciences
- Olivarez College
- Parañaque Central Elementary School
- Parañaque City College of Science and Technology
- Parañaque Elementary School
- Premiere Computer Learning Center
- Rogationist College Parañaque Campus
- San Dionisio Elementary School
- St. Augustine School of Nursing
- STI College Parañaque Campus
- Universal College

== Transportation ==
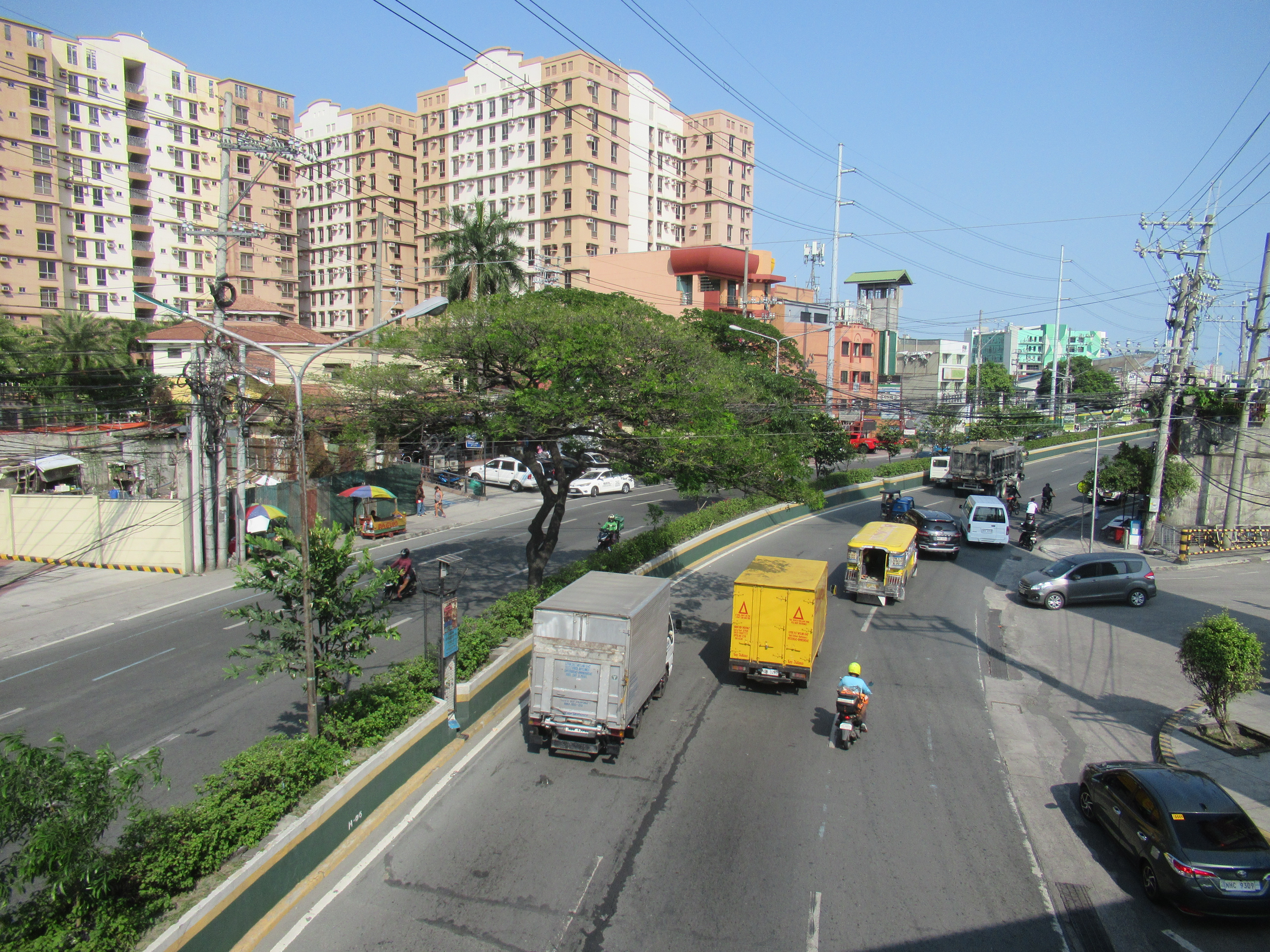
Dr. Santos Avenue, also known as Sucat Road, in San Dionisio

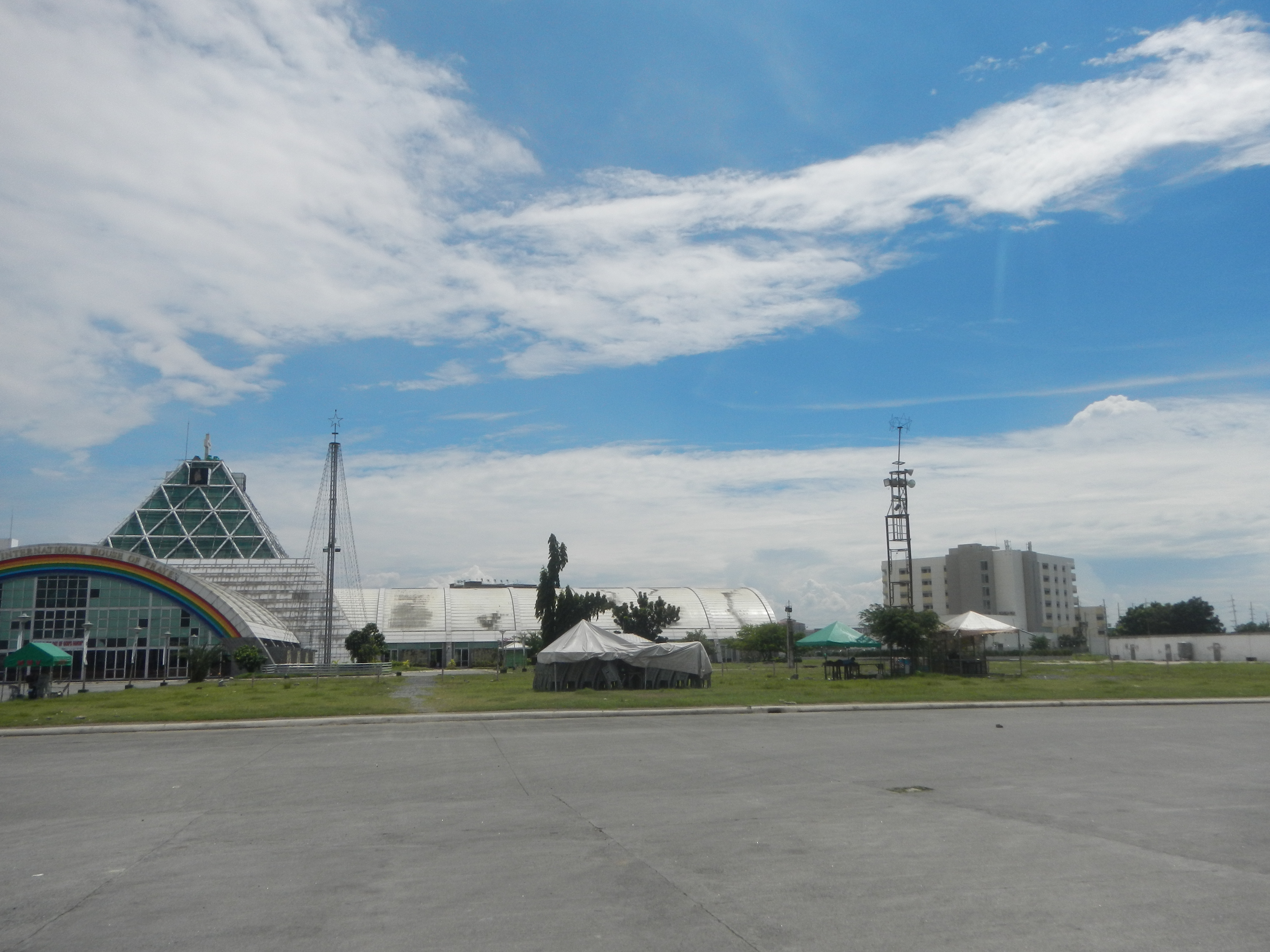
The El Shaddai (movement) International House of Prayer in Amvel Business Park near C-5 Road

San Dionisio's transportation network consists of two national primary roads, one national secondary road and one expressway as of 2017. The Manila–Cavite Expressway and Elpidio Quirino Avenue provide north–south connectivity, with the latter traversing the barangay's old section and the Kabihasnan commercial row along Victor Medina Street. The barangay's main east–west corridor is Dr. Santos Avenue which links its old section with the bigger commercial developments in its eastern sector, including the SM City Sucat shopping mall. In a bend of the avenue north of Victor Medina Streets starts Ninoy Aquino Avenue, a national secondary road that links the barangay to Ninoy Aquino International Airport as well as the popular Dampa, a collection of stalls and restaurants near the boundary with La Huerta that sell and cook fresh and locally-caught seafood. A recent addition to the barangay's road network is the south extension of C-5 Road which opened a large tract of former idle lands south of the international airport in San Dionisio to vertical commercial and residential developments in 2007.

The Dr. Santos station of the LRT-1 which opened in 2024, serves San Dionisio. The station is located at the intersection of C-5 Extension and Dr. Santos Avenue. The C-5 Southlink Expressway will also cut across the barangay parallel to the existing C-5 Road towards an interchange with the Manila–Cavite Expressway.

== Notable residents ==
- Edwin Olivarez, Mayor of Parañaque (2013–2022)
- Pablo Olivarez, Mayor of Parañaque (1992-1995)
- Arcadio Santos, Governor of Rizal (1920–1922)
- Agapito Zialcita, statesman and delegate/signer of the 1898 Philippine Declaration of Independence
- Eduardo Zialcita, Parañaque 1st District Representative (2001–2010)
