= Sucat People's Park =

Park in Muntinlupa, Philippines

Coordinates: 14°27′22″N 121°3′17″E

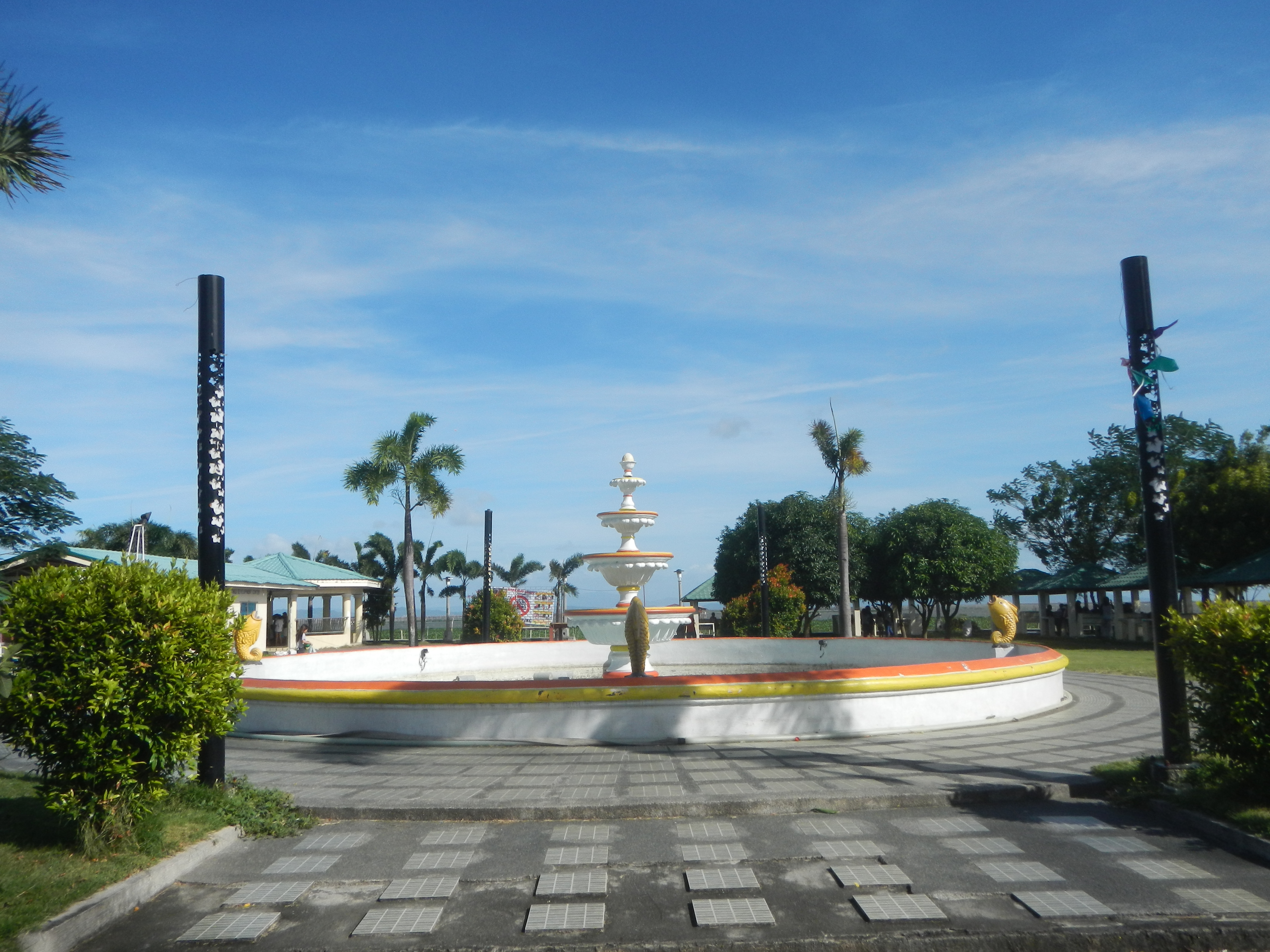
- A fountain serves as the park's centerpiece
- Interactive map of Sucat People's Park
- Type: Urban park
- Location: Muntinlupa, Philippines
- Area: 0.7 hectares (7,000 m^{2})
- Created: 2012
- Operator: Barangay Government of Sucat
- Status: Opened

The Sucat People's Park, also known simply as Sucat Park and Sucmun Park, is a lakefront park on the shore of Laguna de Bay in Muntinlupa, Metro Manila, Philippines. It is a public community park in a reclaimed portion of the village of Sucat just north of the Sucat Thermal Power Plant on the border between Purok 3 and Purok 4, east of Don Juan Bayview Subdivision. Entry is from M.L. Quezon Street (Alabang–Pateros Road) and Meralco Road from the Sucat Interchange of the South Luzon Expressway and Dr. Santos Avenue (Sucat Road).

The plan for the 0.7-hectare (1.7-acre) park in Sucat was announced in April 2012 during the tenure of Mayor Aldrin San Pedro. Through Resolution No. 12-184, the Sangguniang Panlungsod of Muntinlupa approved a loan of ₱14 million from the Development Bank of the Philippines for the development of the people's park and the construction of recreational facilities within the park along with a pier for port landing purposes.

Amenities in the park include pavilions, a central fountain, a covered court, cycling and running tracks, a parking lot, a daycare centre, and several food and beverage stalls. Near the park's entrance on M.L. Quezon Street is the Sucat Barangay Hall, Sucat Health Center and Sucat railway station. The park is lined with palm trees and has a boardwalk and pier extending into Laguna de Bay. The JRF Sucat Covered Court, named after Mayor Jaime R. Fresnedi, is also used as a venue for professional boxing, having hosted several matches in the past, including those of local boxers Toto Landero, Edison Berwela, Adones Cabalquinto, Vergil Puton and Jayson Rotoni.

The Sucat local government charges fees for using the covered court and pavilion, as well as for banca rentals and fishing activities within the park.

== Gallery ==
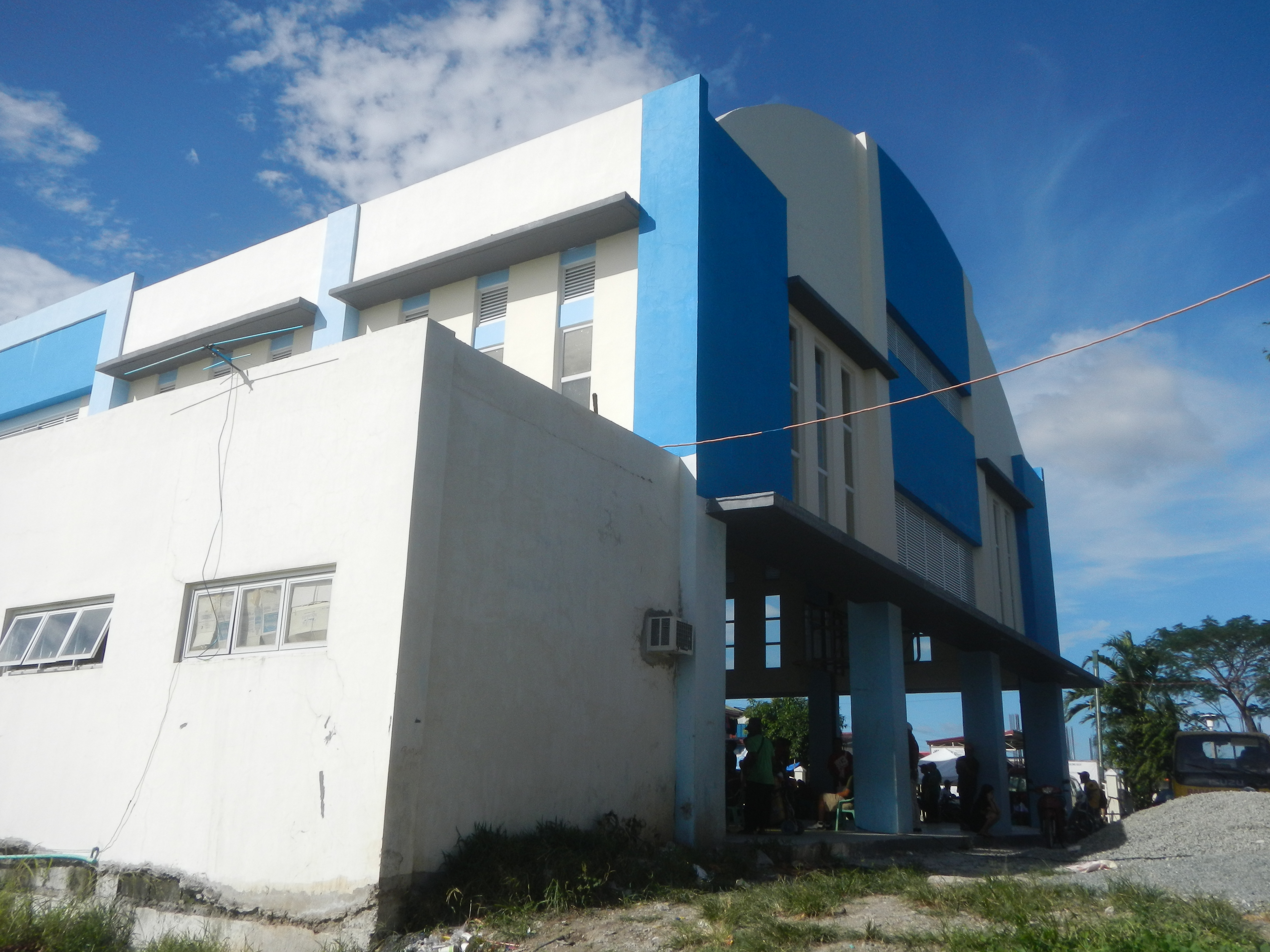
JRF Sucat Covered Court

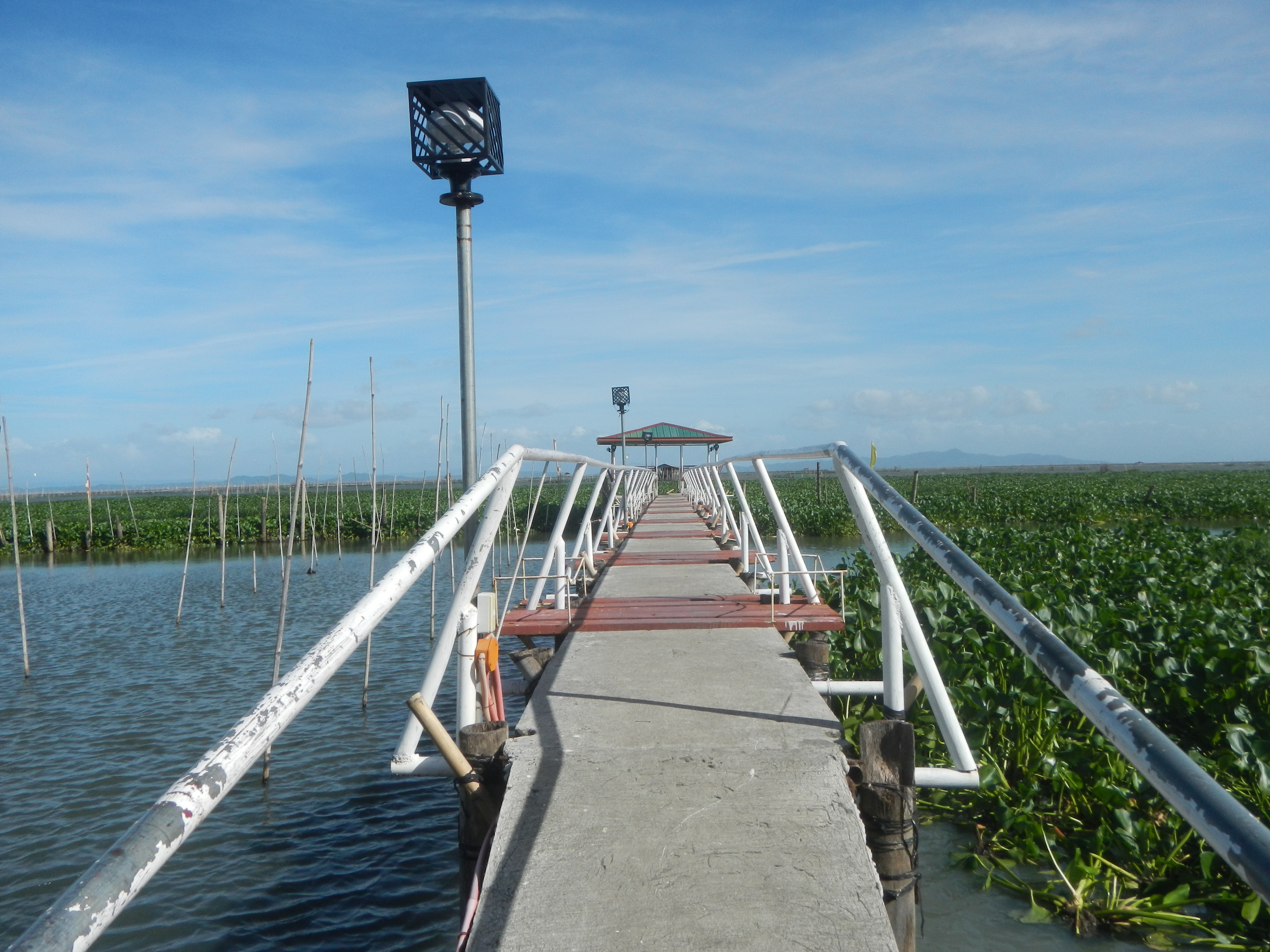
The pier

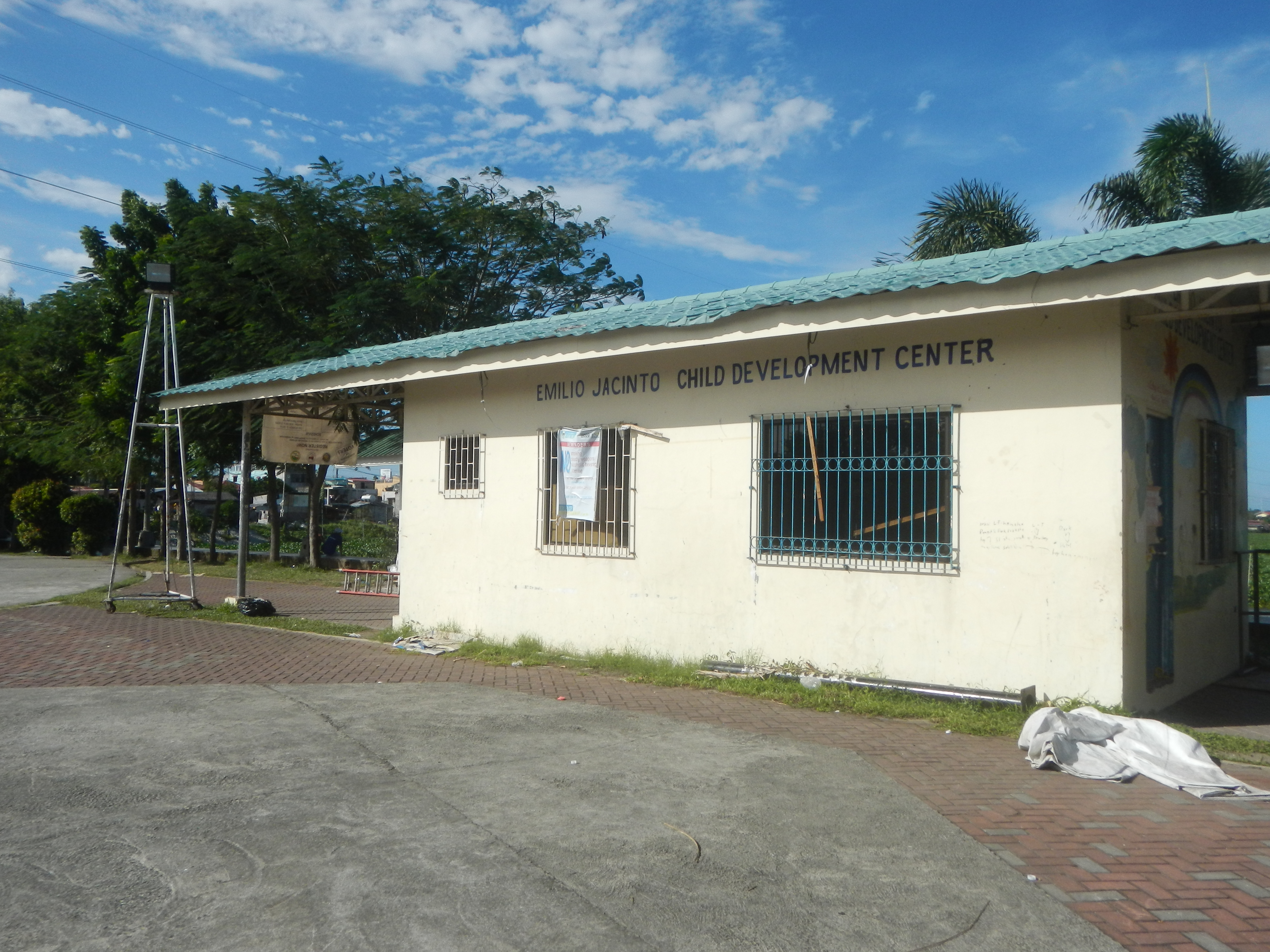
Emilio Jacinto Child Development Center

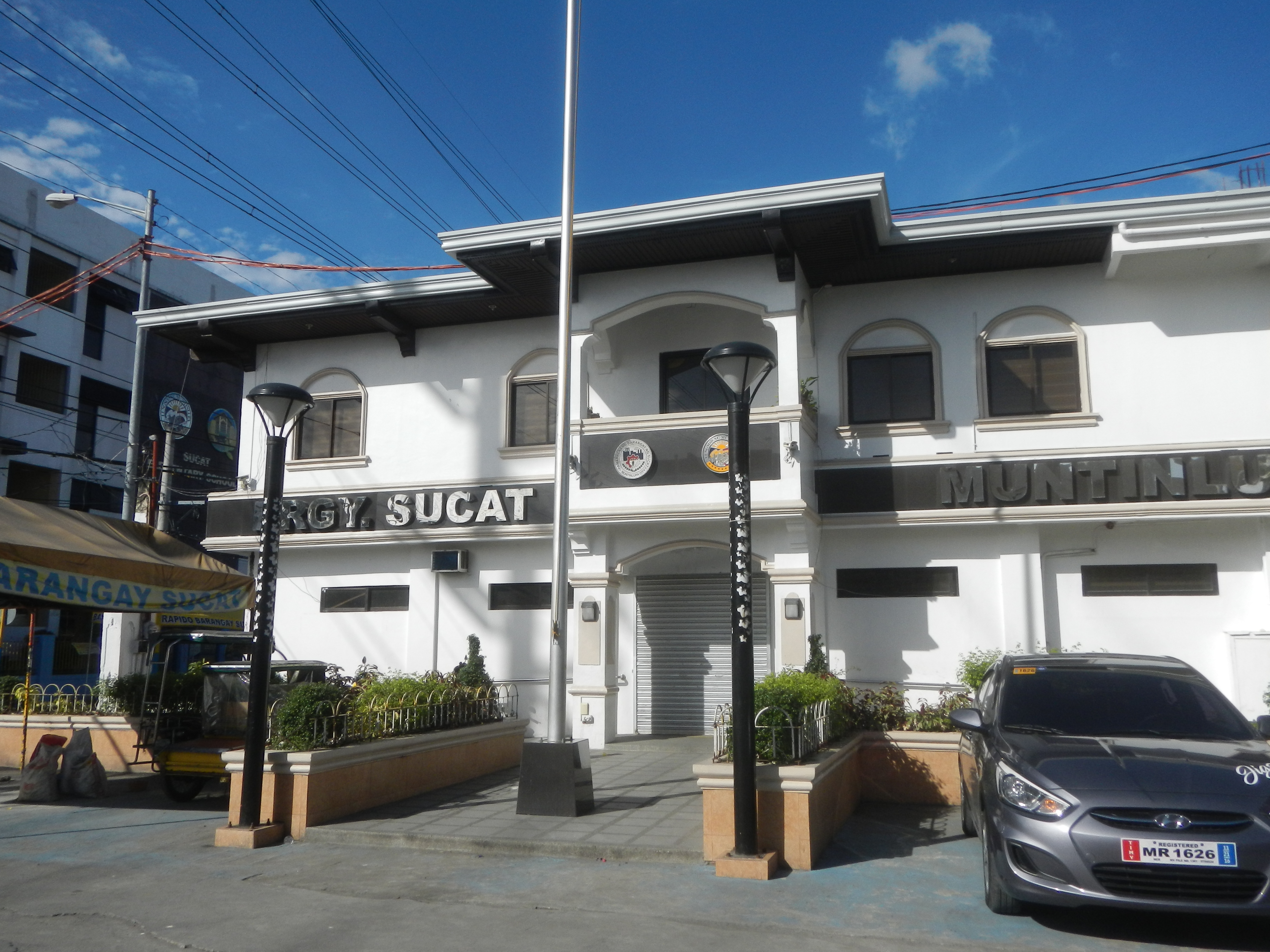
Sucat Barangay Hall at the entrance to the Sucat People's Park

== See also ==
- List of parks in Metro Manila
