= Commex =

Commuter service of the Philippine National Railways

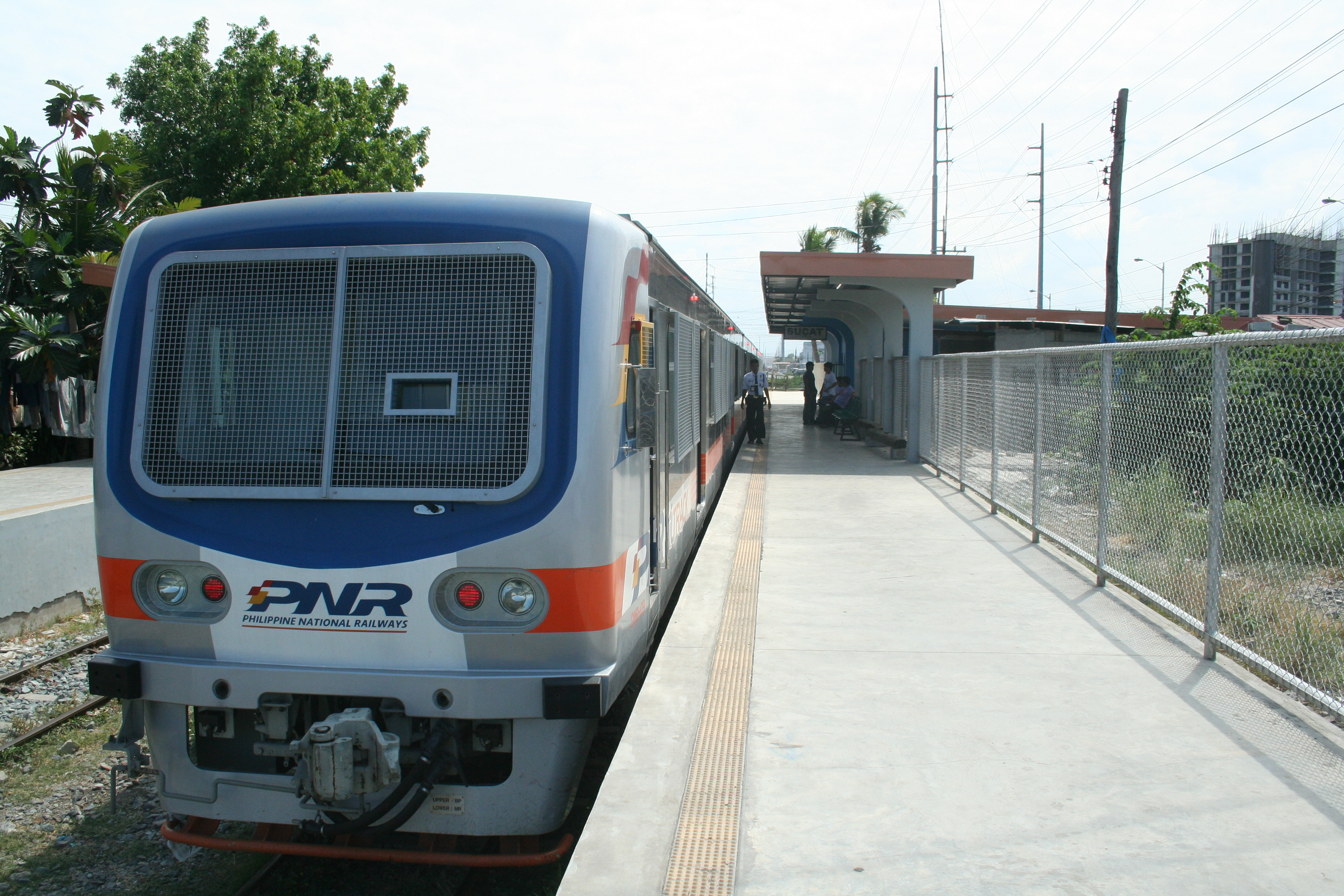
- A Hyundai Rotem DMU at Sucat railway station
- Manufacturer: Hyundai Rotem
- Operator: Philippine National Railways
- Depot: Tutuban railway station
- Line served: Orange Line (South Main Line)

Specifications
- Maximum speed: 56 miles per hour (90 km/h) (50–80 km/h operating speed)
- Track gauge: 1,067 mm (3 ft 6 in)

Commuter Express is a Commuter service of the Philippine National Railways, it was previously operated by ex Japanese coaches, now operated by DMUs, manufactured by Hyundai Rotem.
