= Dr. Santos Avenue =

Road in Parañaque, Philippines

Coordinates: 14°28′1″N 121°0′53″E

Dr. Arcadio Santos Avenue
- Sucat Road; Parañaque–Sucat Road
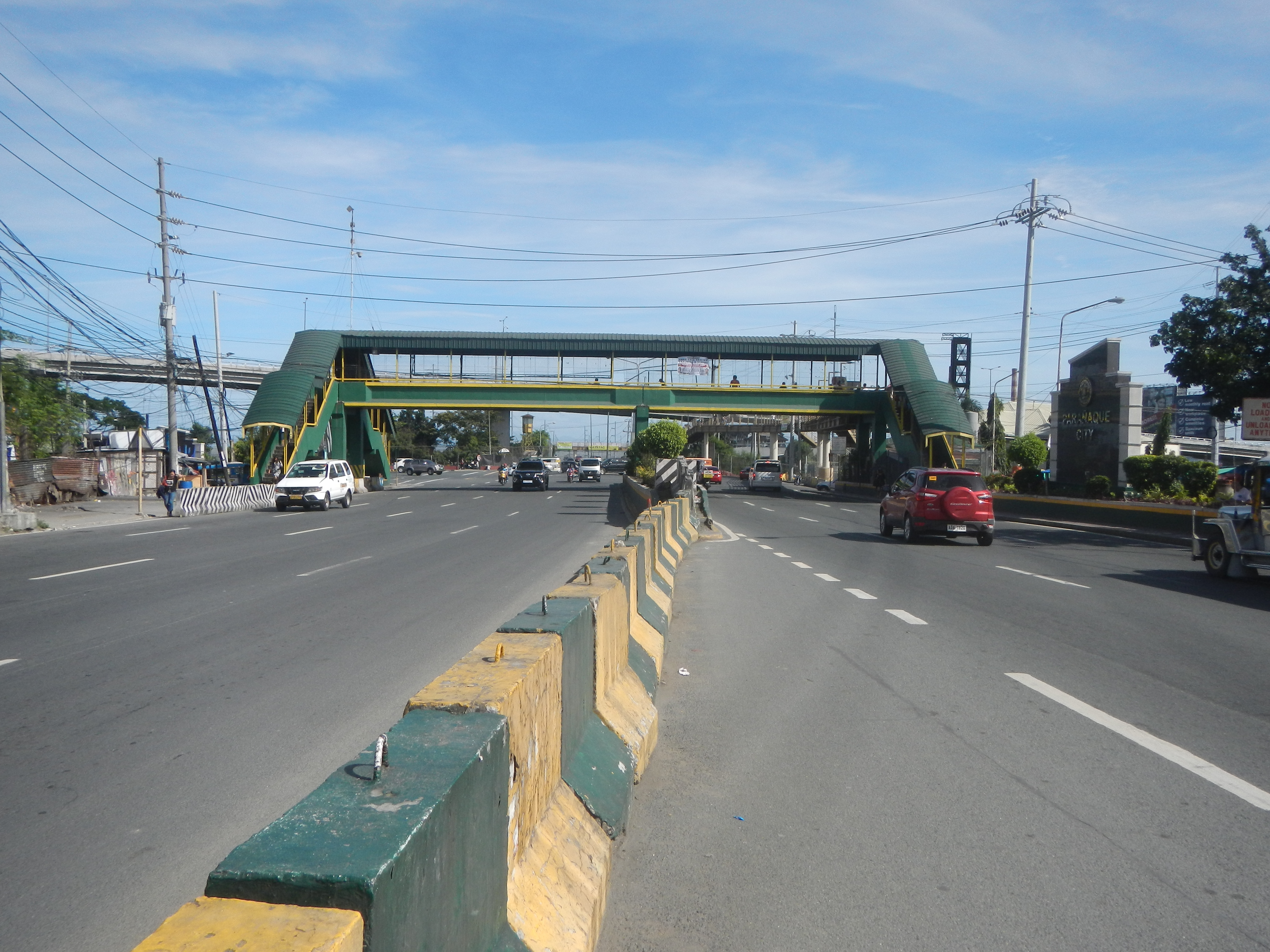
- The avenue in 2017

Route information
- Maintained by the Department of Public Works and Highways
- Length: 8.18 km (5.08 mi) Approximate length: Main route (eastbound): 7.107 km (4.416 mi); Main route (westbound): 7.091 km (4.406 mi); Spur beneath Skyway: 0.2 km (0.12 mi); Spur onto West Service Road: 0.88 km (0.55 mi)
- Existed: 1921–present
- Component highways: N63; N144 in San Antonio, Parañaque

Major junctions
- West end: N195 (Ninoy Aquino Avenue) / A. Bonifacio Street in San Dionisio, Parañaque
- N144 (Parañaque–Sucat Road); AH26 (South Luzon Expressway)
- East end: N144 (Meralco Road) / East Service Road in Sucat, Muntinlupa

Location
- Country: Philippines
- Major cities: Parañaque and Muntinlupa

Highway system
- Roads in the Philippines; Highways; Expressways; List

Dr. Arcadio Santos Avenue or Sucat Road, formerly and still referred to as Sucat Road or Parañaque–Sucat Road, is the primary east–west thoroughfare in Parañaque, southern Metro Manila, Philippines. The avenue's western end is in Barangay San Dionisio as the continuation of Ninoy Aquino Avenue, which leads to Ninoy Aquino International Airport. Its eastern end is at the East Service Road, which runs parallel to the South Luzon Expressway, in Barangay Sucat, Muntinlupa, where it becomes Meralco Road to service the rest of the route to Sucat railway station.

The road's entire main section is designated as National Route 63 (N63), while its short, narrow spur section beneath Skyway's Sucat Exit is a component of National Route 144 (N144); both routes are part of the Philippine highway network. It also has an eastbound spur towards the West Service Road at Sucat Interchange, classified as an unnumbered national tertiary road.

== Etymology ==
The avenue's present name is taken from Arcadio Santos, a native of Parañaque who served as representative and governor of Rizal, where the then-municipality was part of. It is formerly and alternatively known as Sucat Road and was named for the barrio (now barangay) of the same name in Muntinlupa and its railway station to which it led. It is also alternatively known as Parañaque–Sucat Road, indicating its purpose of connecting the old Parañaque town proper, located by Manila Bay, with Sucat in Muntinlupa.

== Route description ==
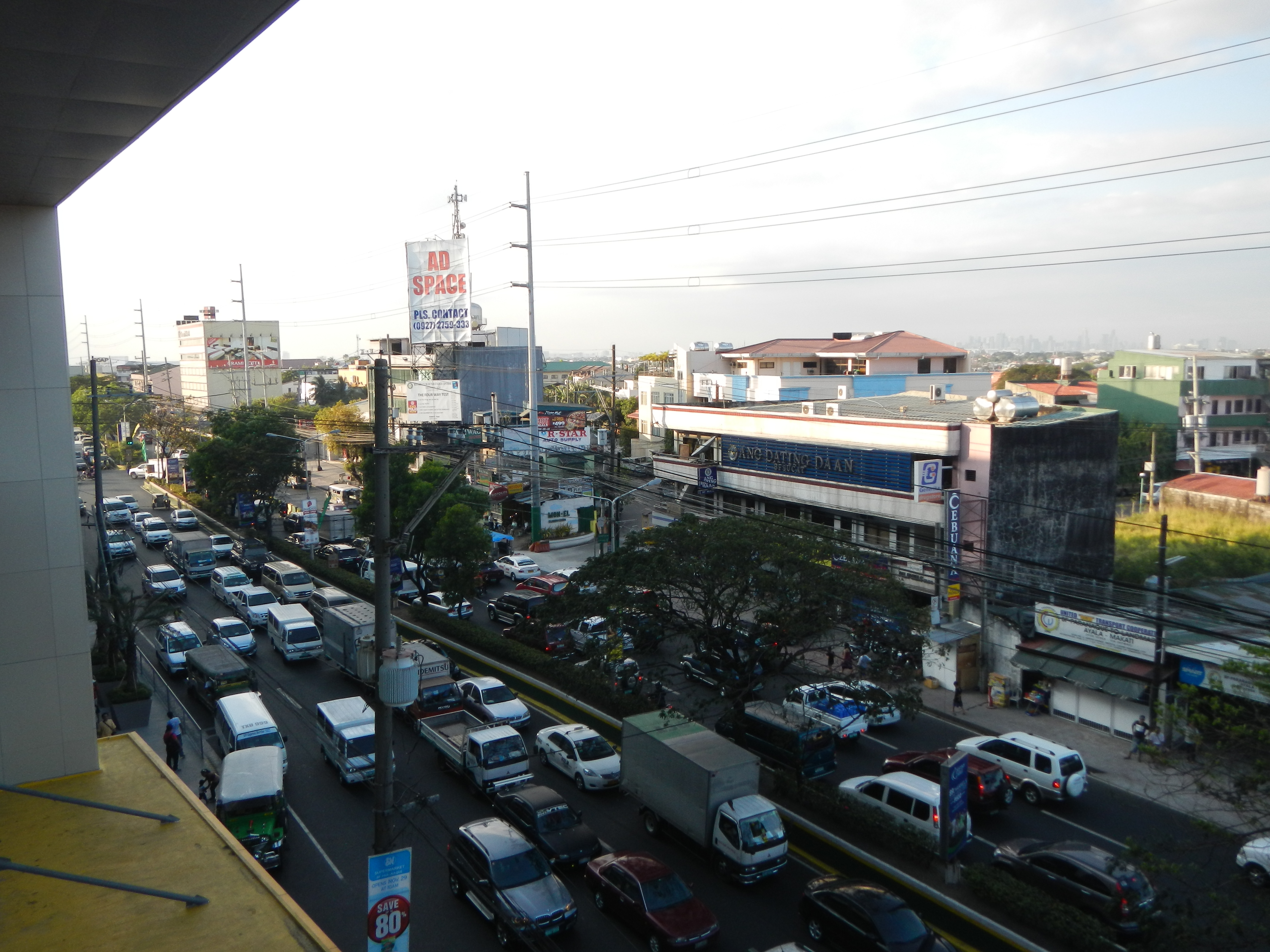
Dr. A. Santos Avenue near President's Avenue viewed from SM City BF Parañaque in BF Homes

Considered as the longest avenue in Parañaque, Dr. Santos Avenue runs through barangays San Dionisio, San Isidro, San Antonio, and BF Homes in Parañaque and Sucat in Muntinlupa. It begins in San Dionisio, continuing from Ninoy Aquino Avenue south of Ninoy Aquino International Airport Terminal 1, where the road narrows to three lanes from four. The road continues east to cross C-5 Road Extension, N. Lopez Avenue, President's Avenue, and the South Luzon Expressway (Sucat Interchange). Two namesake spurs branching from the avenue near Sucat Interchange carry southbound traffic to and from West Service Road, respectively. It terminates at the East Service Road, which runs parallel to the expressway next to the interchange, in Muntinlupa. It then continues east towards the Sucat railway station as Meralco Road.

The eastern section of the avenue is known as the location of two of Metro Manila's biggest cemeteries, Manila Memorial Park and Loyola Memorial Park. Notable places located along the road also include SM City Sucat, SM City BF Parañaque, Amvel Business Park, which houses the El Shaddai church, and the Santana Grove strip mall.

The avenue is served by the Manila Light Rail Transit Line 1 through Dr. Santos station, which is located near the C-5 Extension.

== History ==
The avenue originated as a carabao trail that opened in 1921, overlooking salt farms, fish ponds, and grass plains. It was later paved with asphalt and initially featured two lanes. Later, it apparently integrated most of the short road branching from Pasig–Pateros–Taguig–Alabang Road in Sucat, Muntinlupa. Originally named Sucat Road and Parañaque–Sucat Road, it was later renamed Dr. Arcadio Santos Avenue. The road was later widened, and its old section connecting to Quirino Avenue was repurposed as part of A. Bonifacio Street and as a private driveway in San Dionisio, Parañaque; its historical segment, also in San Dionisio, became a short street known as Old Sucat Road, now discontinued by the CAVITEX–C-5 Link.

In September 2013, a bill was filed in the Philippine House of Representatives to rename Dr. Santos Avenue to President Cory Aquino Avenue. This bill, authored by Representative Eric Olivarez (Parañaque–1st), remained pending in the House Committee on Public Works and Highways as of October 2013.

== Intersections ==
The following is the list of intersections of the main section of Dr. Santos Avenue. Intersections are numbered by kilometer post, with Rizal Park in Manila designated as kilometer zero.

Province	City/Municipality	km	mi	Destinations	Notes
Parañaque				N195 (Ninoy Aquino Avenue) / A. Bonifacio Street	Traffic light intersection. Western terminus; continues west as N195 (Ninoy Aquino Avenue).
Parañaque				Old Sucat Road	One-way into westbound. Access ot HITCH Warehouse.
Parañaque				C-5 Extension	No left turn allowed from eastbound; access to C-5 Extension northbound via Old Sucat Road
Parañaque				Old Sucat Road	One-way exit from westbound; access to C-5 Extension northbound
Parañaque				Angelina Canaynay Avenue	Traffic light intersection; access to Las Piñas
Parañaque				N. Lopez Avenue	Traffic light intersection; access to BF Homes
Parañaque				San Antonio Avenue	Traffic light intersection; access to Parañaque City Hall and Barangay Don Bosco
Parañaque				President's Avenue	Traffic light intersection; access to BF Homes
Parañaque		19	12	AH26 (Skyway) – Makati	Eastbound exit and westbound entrance
Parañaque				N144 (Parañaque–Sucat Road)	Westbound entrance only. Narrow access road beneath Skyway's Sucat Exit
Parañaque				West Service Road	
Parañaque – Muntinlupa boundary				AH26 (SLEX) – Calamba, Alabang, Manila	Diamond interchange (Sucat Interchange)
Muntinlupa				N144 (Meralco Road) / East Service Road	Eastern terminus; continues east as N144 (Meralco Road)
1.000 mi = 1.609 km; 1.000 km = 0.621 mi: Incomplete access

== Landmarks ==
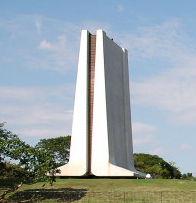
Manila Memorial Park

Dr. Santos Avenue is home to several new commercial developments, particularly near its intersection with the C-5 Extension in San Dionisio, such as the Amvel City (formerly Amvel Business Park), SM City Sucat, Fields Residences, and Avida Towers Sucat. Another development on the avenue is the area near its intersection with President's Avenue in BF Homes, where SM City BF Parañaque, Amaia Steps Sucat and Santana Grove (which houses a Shopwise branch) can be found. This area is also the location of Medical Center Parañaque, Elorde Sports Center, the Manila Memorial Park, and Loyola Memorial Park. The Parañaque City Hall is accessible by turning north on San Antonio Avenue. Between Lopez Avenue and Canaynay Avenue are some of the older shopping centers on the avenue, including Walter Mart Sucat, Liana's Shopping Mall, Jaka Plaza, SM Hypermarket Sucat-Lopez, and Super8 Grocery Warehouse Sucat (formerly Uniwide Warehouse Club Sucat). Olivarez College and Parañaque National High School are some of the biggest educational institutions on the avenue near San Dionisio's border with San Isidro.
