= Las Piñas–Parañaque Critical Habitat and Ecotourism Area =

Protected coastal area in Metro Manila, Philippines

Coordinates: 14.49°N 120.98°E

Las Piñas–Parañaque Wetland Park (LPPWP)
- Las Piñas–Parañaque Critical Habitat and Ecotourism Area (LPPCHEA)
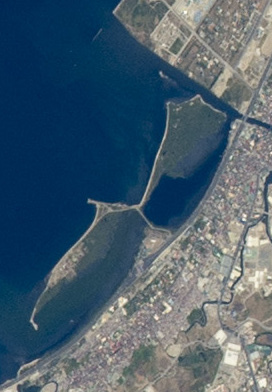
- The protected area in 2016
- Location: Las Piñas and Parañaque, Metro Manila, Philippines
- Area: 181 ha (450 acres)
- Designated: April 22, 2007 (as a critical habitat); August 22, 2018 (as a national protected area)
- Administrator: Department of Environment and Natural Resources
- Islands
- Adjacent to: Manila Bay
- Major islands: Freedom Island; Long Island

Ramsar Wetland
- Official name: Las Piñas–Parañaque Critical Habitat and Ecotourism Area (LPPCHEA)
- Designated: March 15, 2013
- Reference no.: 2124

The Las Piñas–Parañaque Critical Habitat and Ecotourism Area (LPPCHEA), also known as the Las Piñas–Parañaque Wetland Park, is a protected area at the coasts of the cities of Las Piñas and Parañaque in Metro Manila, Philippines. The entire wetland is a declared Ramsar site under the Ramsar Convention of UNESCO.

== History ==
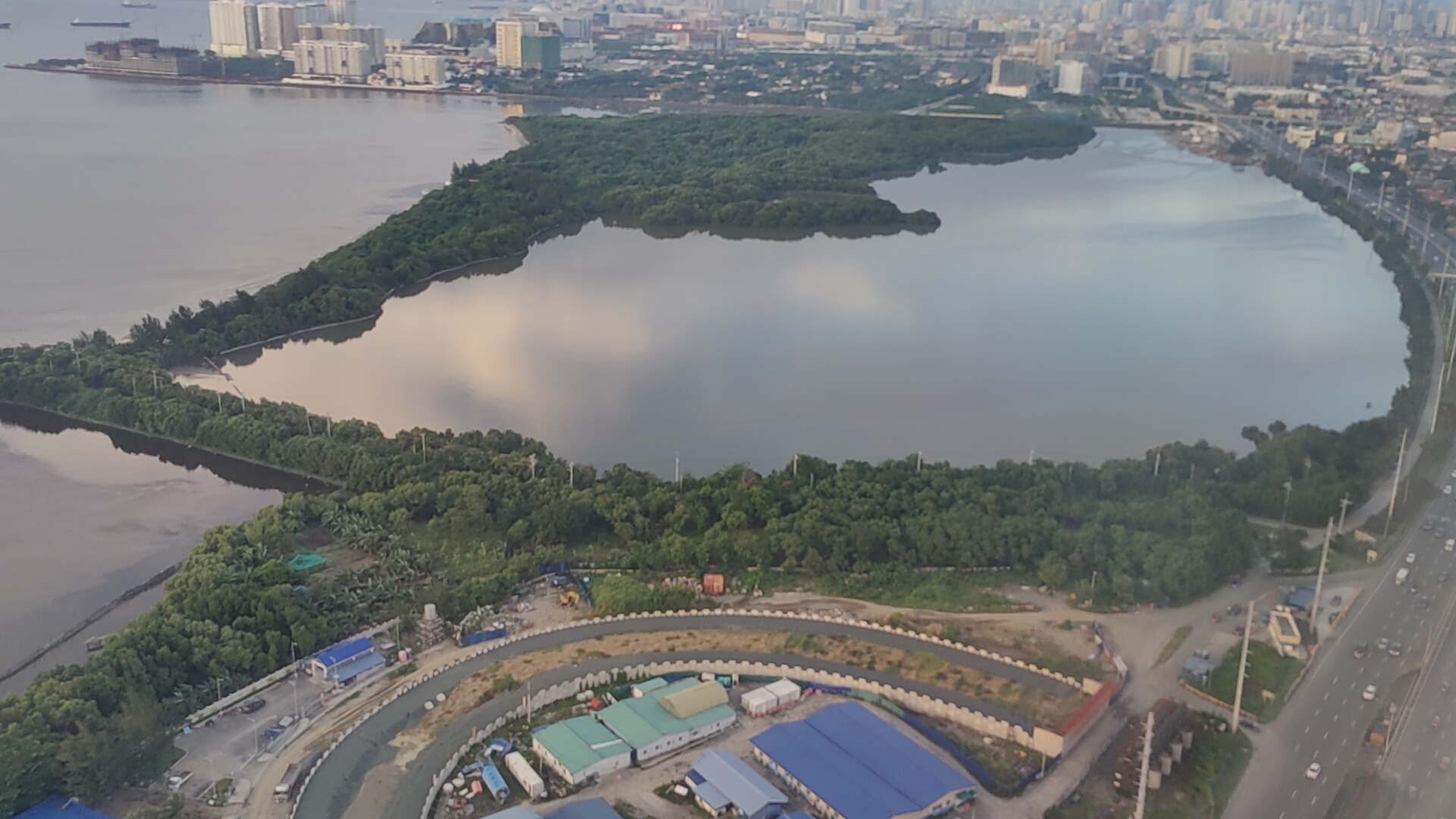
Aerial view of the Las Piñas–Parañaque Critical Habitat and Ecotourism Area in 2022

In November 1973, the Construction Development Corporation of the Philippines (now Philippine National Construction Corporation) secured a government contract for the Manila–Cavite Coastal Road and Reclamation Project. The project to extend Roxas Boulevard south to Cavite province required reclamation of foreshore lands in Parañaque and Las Piñas. Construction of the 6.6-kilometer-long (4.1 mi) coastal road started during the term of President Ferdinand Marcos and was completed and opened to traffic in September 1985. The island was formed during construction with plans to expand the island and continue reclamation of the coastal area from Bay City to Las Piñas following Philippine Reclamation Authority's masterplan for the Southern Reclamation Project.

The islands were proclaimed as a Critical Habitat by the Philippine government through Presidential Proclamation No. 1412 on April 22, 2007. It covered 175 hectares (430 acres) covering the two interconnected islands where important bird habitats such as mangroves, beach forests, lagoons, and mudflats are found. It was listed as a Ramsar wetland of international importance on March 15, 2013. Upon the enactment of the Republic Act No. 11038 (Expanded National Integrated Protected Area Act) on June 22, 2018, the LPPCHEA was legislated as a National Protected Area covering 181 hectares (450 acres).

On February 12, 2019, approximately 22 Manila Bay land reclamation projects were announced by the government, sparking criticism. Among those to be affected by the reclamation projects is the Las Piñas–Parañaque Critical Habitat and Ecotourism Area. The city government and concerned agencies inaugurated The Wetland Center Museum at the Las Piñas-Parañaque Wetland Park on February 2, 2024 to mark World Wetlands Day. In 2025, the city's representative to Congress stated that he will push for reclamation projects in the wetland park for business purposes, which would permanently destroy the Ramsar site's natural environment and biodiversity. On September 25, 2025, President Bongbong Marcos vetoed a bill to expand Las Piñas-Parañaque Wetland Park by establishing a buffer zone with an area of 1,128 ha (2,790 acres), citing concerns over its effects on existing reclamation projects in the area and the risk of increased bird strikes in the vicinity of Ninoy Aquino International Airport.

== Geography ==
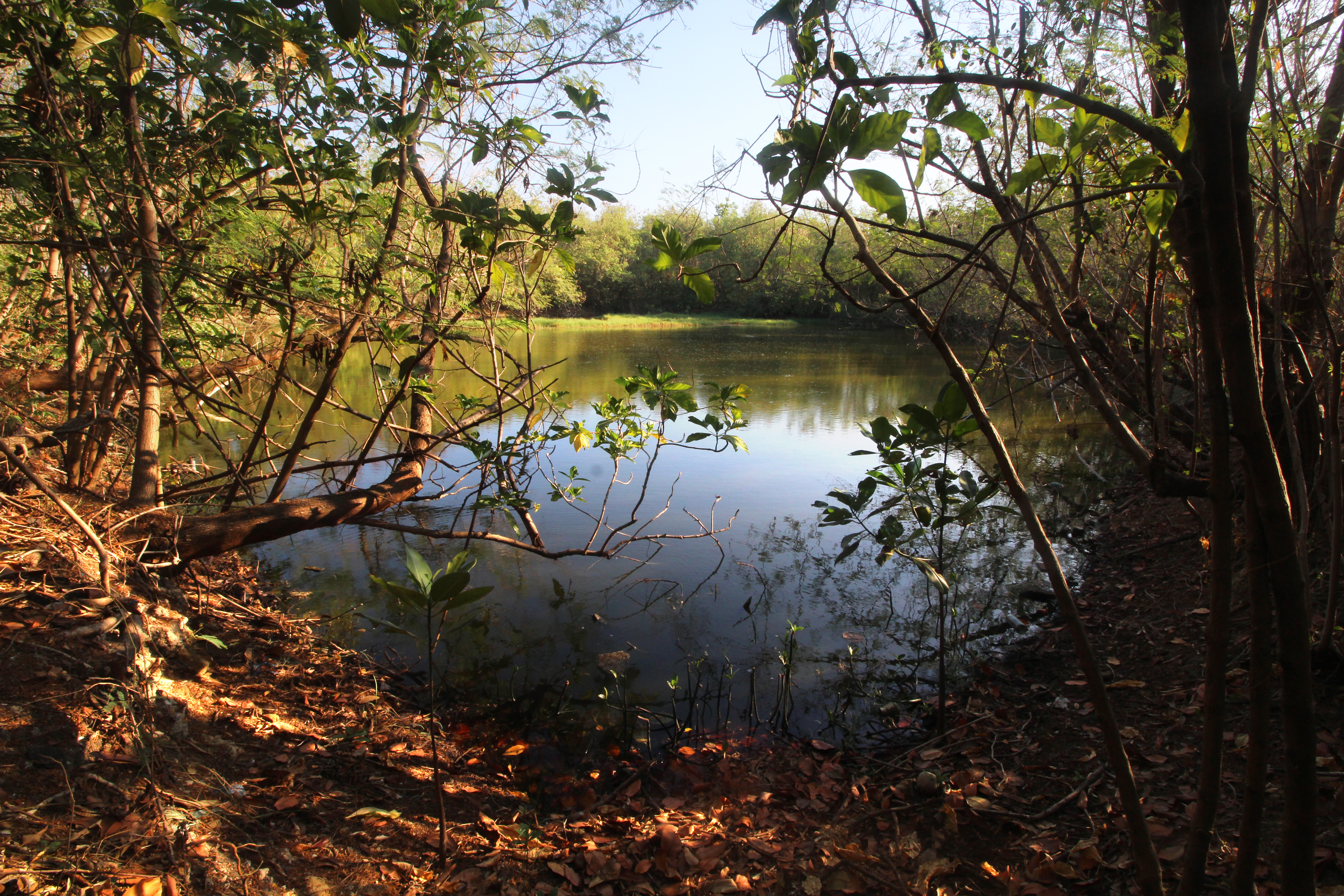
Pond at the park

The Las Piñas–Parañaque Critical Habitat and Ecotourism Area (LPPCHEA) are composed of two primary islands; Freedom Island and Long Island. The area is covered with mangroves, ponds and lagoons, mudflats, salt marshes, and mixed beach forests. The entire LPPCHEA covers an area of 181.63 hectares (448.8 acres); about 114 hectares (280 acres) of which are by tidal mudflats, and 30 hectares (74 acres) of which are by its mangrove forest.

=== Freedom Island ===
Freedom Island located in the northern portion of the LPPCHEA in Parañaque is an artificial island formed between 1973 and 1985 during the construction of the Manila–Cavite Coastal Road.

Freedom Island covers an area of about 74 acres (0.30 km^{2}) with an elevation of between 0 and 7 meters (0 and 23 ft) above sea level. It is a barrier island located across from the Manila–Cavite Expressway just south of another reclaimed site called Asiaworld City, a residential waterfront community that is part of the bigger Bay City development. The island runs along the coast from barangay La Huerta at its north end near the mouth of Parañaque River into barangay San Dionisio right at the border with Las Piñas. A narrow landfill connects its southern tip to the mainland and Long Island near the expressway toll barrier.

Freedom Island consists primarily of loam and dredged material pulled from the bay and nearby lands.

=== Long Island ===
Long Island and another smaller island also formed by land reclamation are situated south of Freedom Island and is under the jurisdiction of the city of Las Piñas.

== Fauna ==
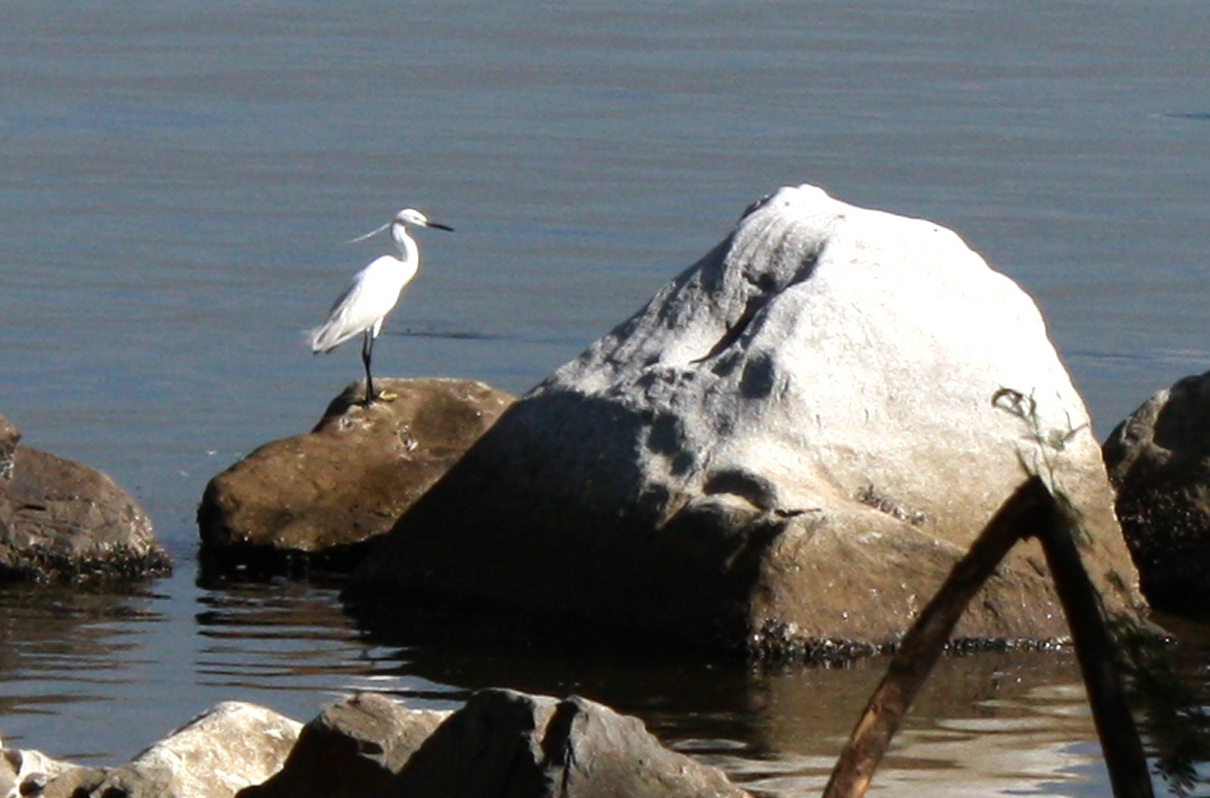
A white egret at the LPPCHEA.

The LPPCHEA contains a mangrove forest and swamps providing a habitat for many migratory bird species which devises the East Asian–Australasian Migratory Flyway. There are at least 41 recorded migratory birds coming from as far as China, Japan, and Siberia in the protected area. The migration season is every August to April and there could be 5,000 individual birds daily. Among these birds are the Little Egret, Black-crowned night heron and the Common Moorhen.

Among the endemic species in the area is the Philippine duck. The LPPCHEA is the only known breeding ground for the ducks in Metro Manila. During the low tide, small invertebrates and macrobenthic species are exposed to the air which are consumed by birds and other small animals in the area. The area is also a spawning ground, nursery and sanctuary for fishes.

== Flora ==
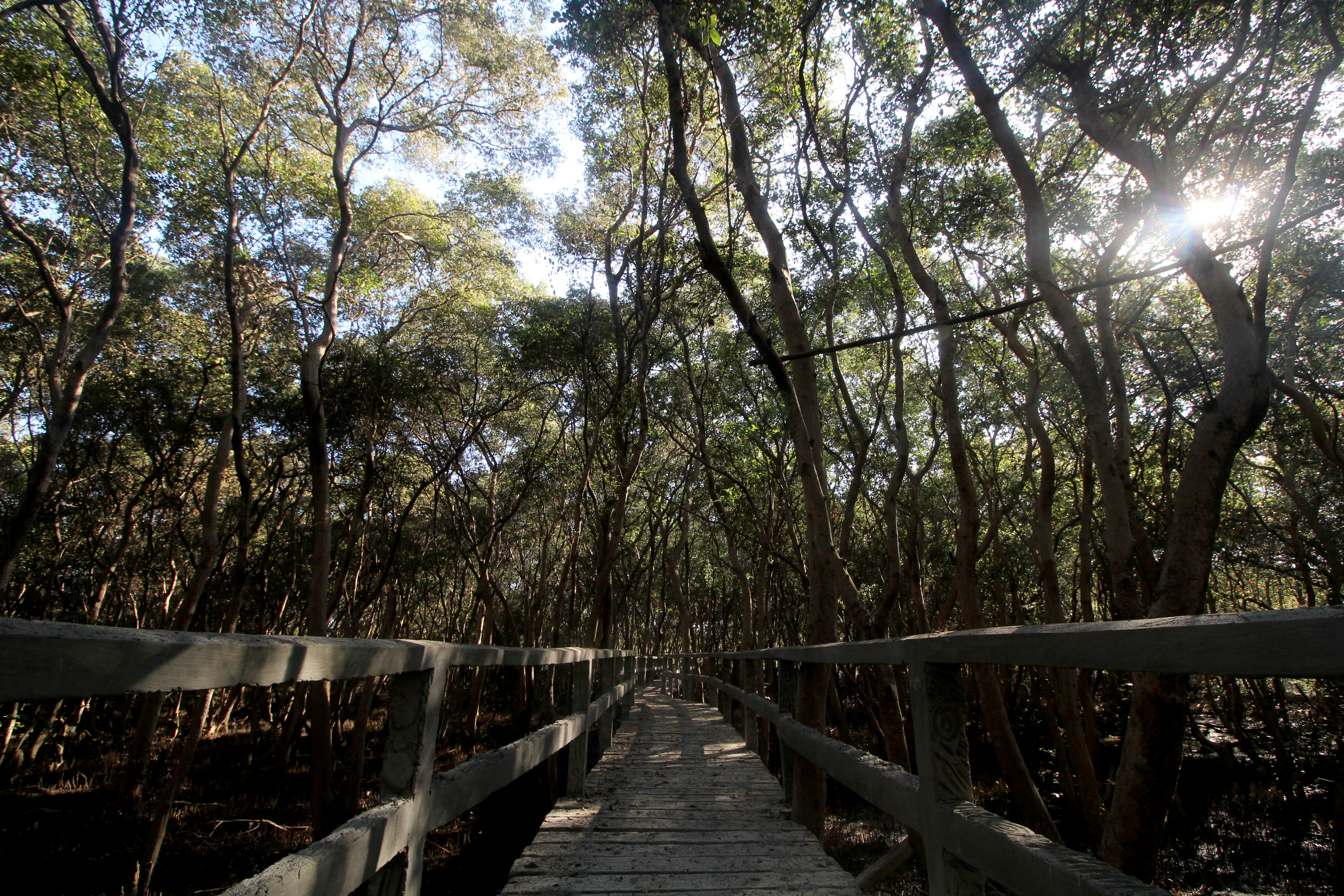
LPPCHEA's mangrove trees

The LPPCHEA hosts one of the few remaining mangrove forests in Metro Manila. There are 11 mangrove species in the area. These are locally known as the Bungalon, Bakauan Babae, Bakauan Bato, Pototan, Kolasi, Pagatpat, Banalo, Tabigi, Saging-saging, Buta-buta and Nilad. Nilad is a species introduced to the area by the Department of Environment and Natural Resources-National Capital Region (DENR-NCR).

Only a select few salt-tolerant species of herbs, grasses, and shrubs grow in the LPPCHEA's salt marshes due to the high saline content in the area's soil.

== See also ==
- List of islands in the Greater Manila Area
