= Sucat, Muntinlupa =

Barangay in Muntinlupa City, Metro Manila, Philippines

Sucat
- Barangay
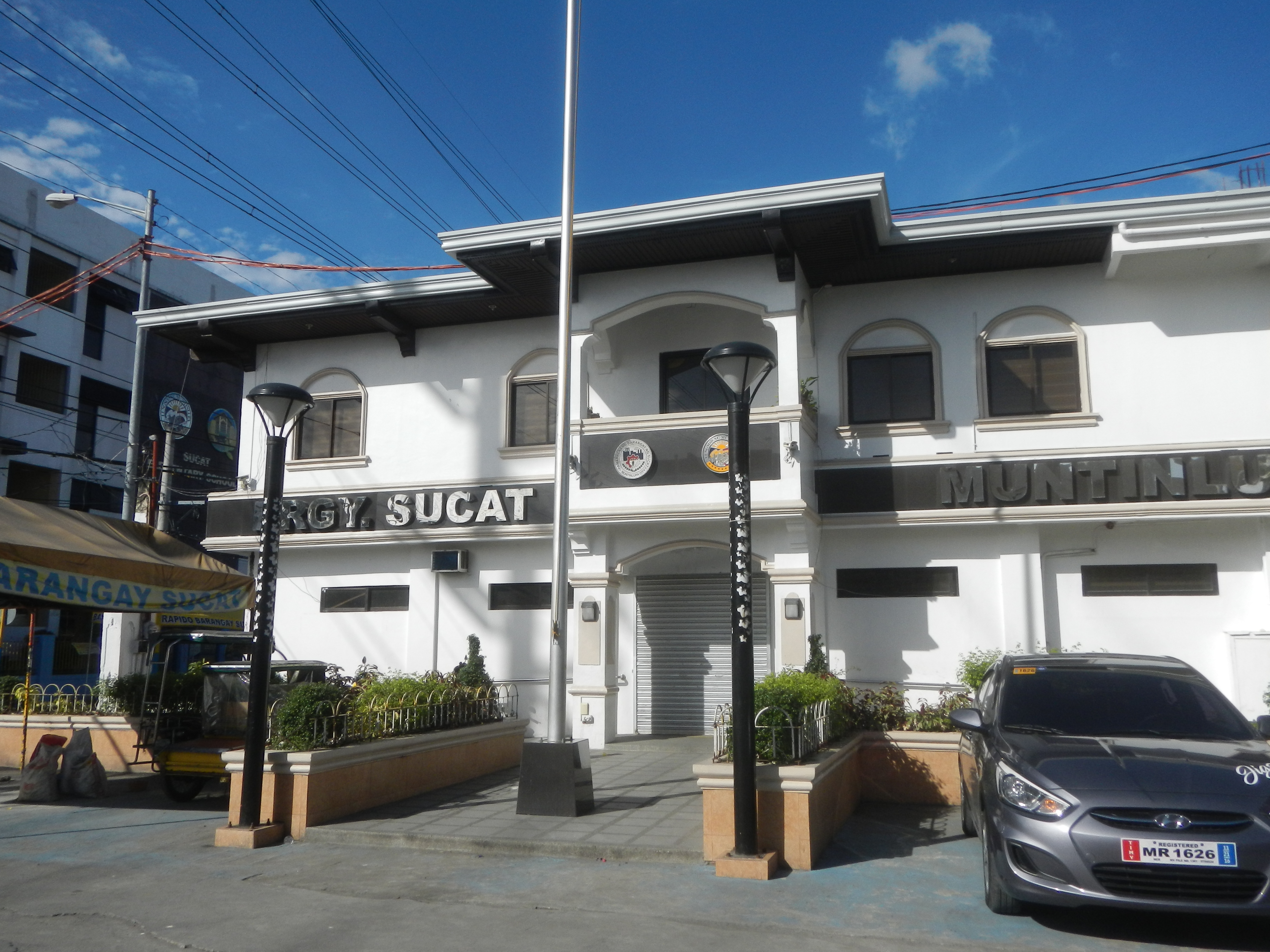
- Sucat Barangay Hall

- Location within Metro Manila
- Coordinates: 14°27′36″N 121°2′59.9″E
- Country: Philippines
- Region: National Capital Region
- City: Muntinlupa
- District: 2nd legislative district of Muntinlupa

Government
  - Type: Barangay
  - Barangay Captain: Rafael Sevilla

Area
  - Total: 2.623 km^{2} (1.013 sq mi)

Population (2020)
  - Total: 56,354
  - Density: 21,480/km^{2} (55,640/sq mi)
- Time zone: UTC+8 (PST)
- Postal Code: 1770
- Area code: 02
- PSGC: 137603007
- Website: muntinlupacity.gov.ph/barangays/brgy-sucat/

Sucat is an administrative division in southern Metro Manila, Philippines. It is an urban barangay in Muntinlupa with many high-rise condominiums and commercial establishments. The area is also well-known for the Sucat exit of the South Luzon Expressway and Metro Manila Skyway.

It is bounded on the north by Barangays Bagumbayan and South Daang Hari of Taguig; on the south by the Sucat River and Barangays Buli and Cupang; on the west by Barangays San Martin de Porres, Marcelo Green, San Antonio, and BF Homes of Parañaque; and on the east by Laguna de Bay.

== Etymology ==
The name of the barangay comes from the Malay and Filipino vernacular word sukat, which means "measurement". Historically, the community was measured several times by the Posadas family when Don Juan Posadas, who at that time had a very close association with the Spanish government officials, was the mayor of Manila. He acquired all the land that he wanted to measure. When it was a barrio, it was spelled as Sukat, apparently stylized in Tagalog.

== History ==
In 1970, the textile mill facilities of Consolidated Mills, Inc. in Sucat was foreclosed by the Development Bank of the Philippines and leased to a group of textile businessmen, among whom were Ramon Siy and Ang Beng Uh, the latter from Universal Textile Mills (or U-Tex) in Marikina. The businessmen then established Solid Mills, Inc. in January 1971 for manufacturing denim fabric, and by March 1976 they fully acquired all the mill facilities of Consolidated Mills from DBP. From the 1970s to the 1980s, Solid Mills was the only company in the Philippines to own an indigo-rope dyeing range that allows for denim production.

In late 2003, Solid Mills president Philip Ang closed the last operational textile factory of the company, and by mid-2006, he sold the company's seven-hectare property to John Gokongwei.

== Subdivisions ==
While barangays are the administrative divisions of the city, and are legally part of the addresses of establishments and homes, residents also include their subdivision. Listed below are the subdivisions in this barangay.

- Augusto Posadas Village
- Corinthian Villas
- Don Juan Bayview Subdivision
- Doña Rosario Heights Subdivision
- Doña Rosario Bayview Subdivision
- Lakefront
  - La Posada
  - Marina Heights
  - Presidio
  - The Marfori
- Patio Homes
- Southbay Gardens (shared with Parañaque)

Sitio Bagong Silang, located in southwestern Sucat, is disputed with the adjacent barangay of BF Homes in Parañaque. Meanwhile, Sitio Pagkakaisa in barangay San Martin de Porres, Parañaque is erroneously considered as part of Sucat, Muntinlupa; in fact, Sucat Elementary School has an annex campus in this sitio.

== Demographics ==
Barangay Sucat is the fifth most-populated barangay in Muntinlupa, with a population of 59,601 people according to the 2024 census.

Year	Population
2007	52,502
2010	46,964
2015	57,504
2020	56,354
2024	59,601

== Education ==
The Department of Education (DepEd) is responsible for basic education in the Philippines. The Commission on Higher Education (CHED) is responsible for Higher Education in the Philippines.

Schools located in the barangay are as follows:

- Bagong Silang Elementary School
- Bay View Academy
- Miraculous Medal School
- Saint Augustine School for the Deaf
- Sucat Elementary School
- Sucat Elementary School Sitio Pagkakaisa Annex Zone 3
- Sucat Elementary School Sitio Pagkakaisa Annex Zone 4
- Muntinlupa Business Highschool (Sucat Annex)
- Sto. Domingo Pascual Academy, Inc.
- Colegio De Muntinlupa

== See also ==
- Sucat People's Park
- Sucat Thermal Power Plant
- Sucat railway station
