= Christ the King Parish Church (BF Homes, Caloocan) =

Roman Catholic church in Caloocan, Philippines

Christ the King Parish
- Christ the King Parish
- 14°44′01″N 121°01′25″E
- Location: BF Homes, Caloocan
- Country: Philippines
- Denomination: Roman Catholic

History
- Founded: January 7, 1983; 43 years ago
- Founder: Missionary Society of St. Columban
- Dedication: Christ the King

Administration
- Province: Ecclesiastical Province of Manila
- Diocese: Novaliches

Clergy
- Priest(s): Sonitus Garsa Bambang, MSF

Christ the King Parish is a Roman Catholic parish church in BF Homes, Caloocan, Philippines. It is under the jurisdiction of the Diocese of Novaliches.

== History ==
The Christ the King Parish was established on January 7, 1983, by Cardinal-Archbishop Jaime Sin under the Columban Missionaries with John Leydon. Leydon was parish priest for 12 years. On March 12, 1995, the Columban turned over the leadership to the Diocese of Caloocan with the assignment of its first Filipino pastor, Jaime Z. Lara. Then, the Kaybiga and Bagbaguin areas of Caloocan were detached from the parish resulting in the reorganization of the latter.

The parish created seven sub-parishes: Sto. Kristo (Barangay Llano), Holy Family (Sunriser Subdivision), Mary Help of Christians (Silanganan Subdivision), St. Joseph the Worker (Dolmar Subdivision), Our Lady of La Naval (BF Homes III Deparo), and St. Martin de Pores (Cefels Subdivision).

== Parish priests ==
Parish priests
Year installed	Name
1983	John Leydon
1995	Jaime Z. Lara
1997	Rudy M. Tulibas
2005	Christopher V. Santos
2007	Tom Flores
2013	Lukas Huvang Ajat
2016	Yohanes Kopong Tuan
2024	Sonitus Garsa Bambang, MSF

== Feast ==
The parish celebrates its feast day every 3rd Sunday of November, coinciding with the Solemnity of Christ the King festivities in Catholic tradition.
