= Banco Filipino =

Savings and loan association in the Philippines

- Type: Public
- Traded as: PSE: BF
- Industry: Finance
- Founded: Manila, Philippines (1964; 62 years ago) (1994; 32 years ago)
- Defunct: 1985; 41 years ago 2011; 15 years ago
- Headquarters: Makati, Philippines
- Key people: Teodoro O. Arcenas Jr., Chairman and President
- Products: Banking
- Revenue: ₱2.932 billion (▲37%) (2001)
- Number of employees: 700
- Website: www.bancofilipino.com

Banco Filipino Savings and Mortgage Bank (PSE: BF), or simply Banco Filipino, was a savings and loan association based in the Philippines. It is also known for property developments such as BF Homes, subdivisions in Caloocan, Quezon City, Parañaque, and Las Piñas. The Bangko Sentral ng Pilipinas ordered the bank's closure on March 17, 2011, and placed it under the receivership of state-run Philippine Deposit Insurance Corporation (PDIC), saying its liabilities topped its assets by ₱8.4 billion. The slogan of Banco Filipino was Subok na Matibay, Subok na Matatag (English: Proven to be Stable, Proven to be Strong).

== 2011 closure ==
Banco Filipino was closed by the Bangko Sentral ng Pilipinas, which claimed that Banco Filipino has exceeded its assets with ₱8.4 billion worth of liabilities in violation of Philippine law, which states that a bank's assets must equal or be in excess of its liabilities. However, Banco Filipino claims that it had ₱31.4 billion worth of properties and ₱23.8 billion worth of liabilities leaving the savings and mortgage bank with ₱1.6 billion of positive assets, which could have been used in its planned rehabilitation.

Meanwhile, the Philippine Deposit Insurance Corporation (PDIC) revealed that Banco Filipino depositors whose accounts had at least ₱10,000 when the bank went on a holiday would be getting paid starting June 2011.

Cristina Orbeta, executive vice president of the PDIC, said the PDIC has settled 53 percent of the closed bank's deposit liabilities, which contained ₱5,000 or less in their accounts at the time of closure.

== See also ==
- List of banks in the Philippines
