= Ninoy Aquino Avenue =

Road in Parañaque, Metro Manila, Philippines

Coordinates: 14°30′5″N 120°59′53″E

Ninoy Aquino Avenue
- Imelda Avenue
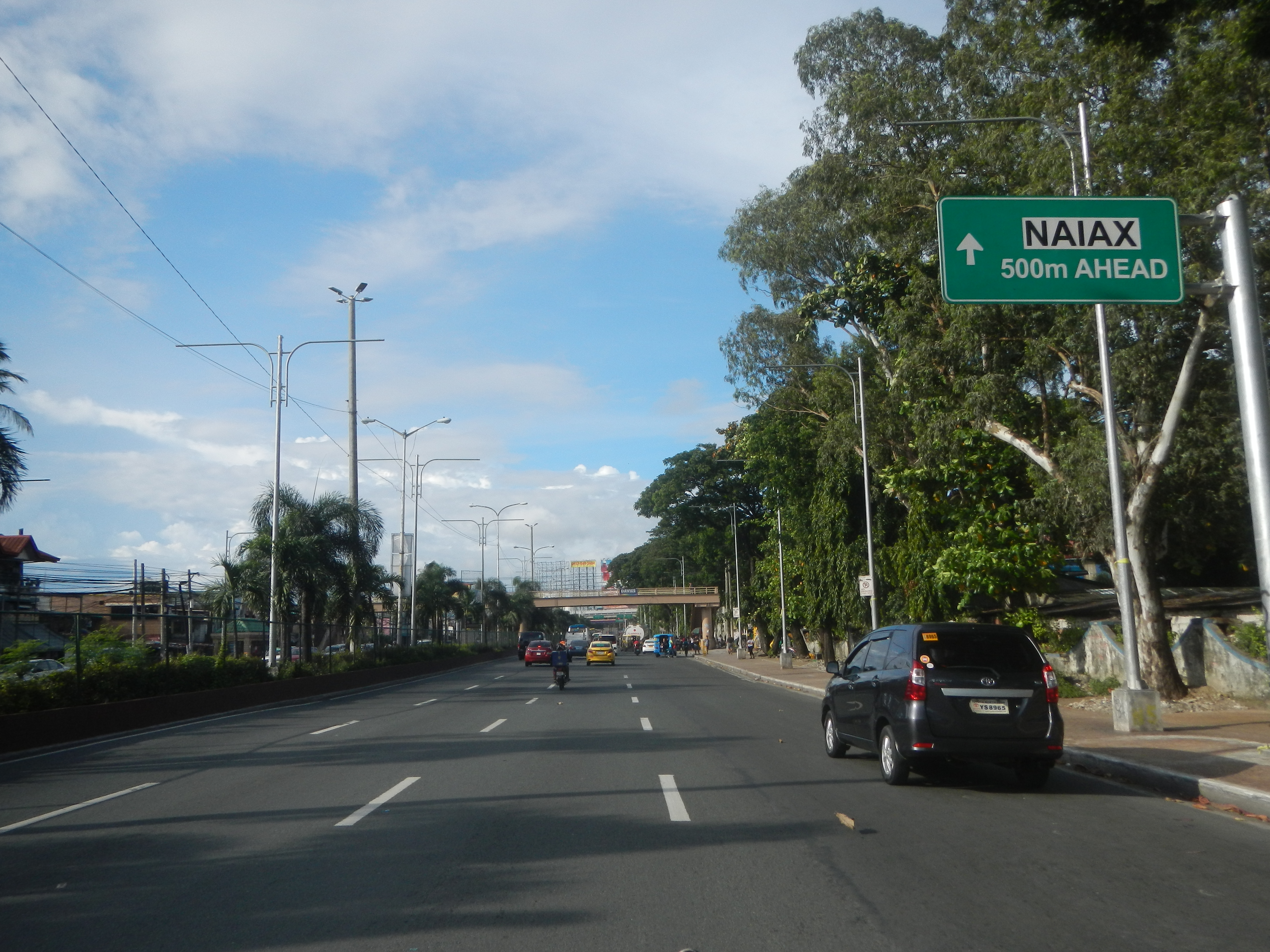
- Ninoy Aquino Avenue view northbound towards NAIA Road

Route information
- Maintained by the Department of Public Works and Highways
- Length: 3.2 km (2.0 mi)
- Component highways: N195

Major junctions
- North end: N194 (NAIA Road) in Pasay
- E6 (NAIA Expressway) E5 (CAVITEX-C-5 Link)
- South end: N63 (Dr. A. Santos Avenue) and A. Bonifacio Street in Parañaque

Location
- Country: Philippines
- Major cities: Parañaque and Pasay

Highway system
- Roads in the Philippines; Highways; Expressways; List

Ninoy Aquino Avenue is a north–south collector road that links Pasay and Parañaque in southern Metro Manila, Philippines. It serves as an extension to Dr. Santos Avenue (formerly Sucat Road) and a feeder road to Ninoy Aquino International Airport (NAIA) from the south and the east. Like the airport it passes through, it is named after Senator Benigno "Ninoy" Aquino Jr., who was assassinated at the airport in 1983.

== Route description ==
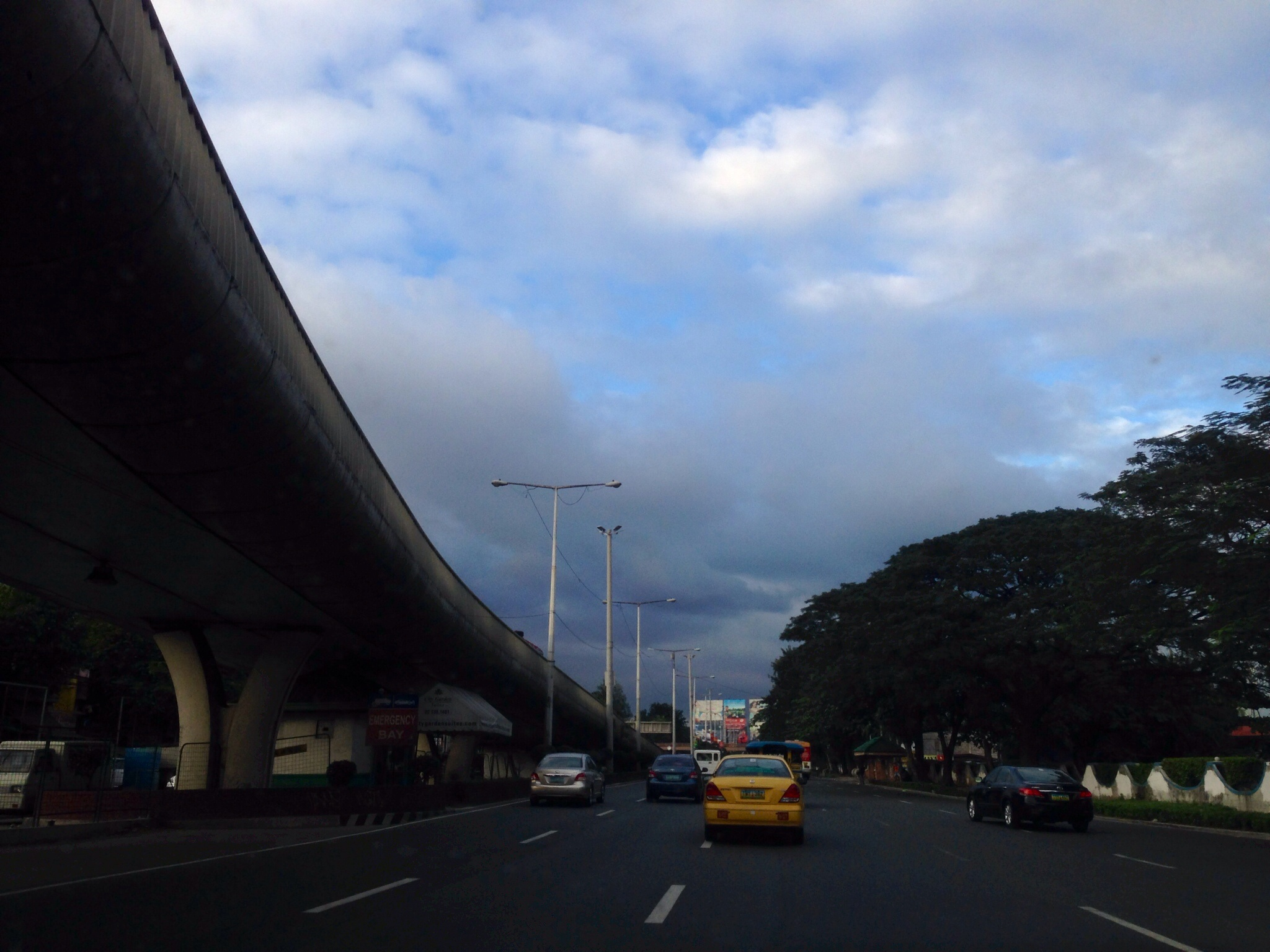
Ninoy Aquino Avenue near NAIA Terminal 1

The road commences at the junction with A. Bonifacio Street and the road into Amvel City in Barangay San Dionisio, Parañaque as a continuation of Dr. Santos Avenue. The elevated LRT Line 1 South Extension traverses along the avenue between A. Bonifacio and Irasan Streets. It then travels north toward its crossing over the Parañaque River and the old NAIA Terminal 1, traversing Barangays La Huerta and Santo Niño. Notable landmarks include the Dampa Seafood Market, the former Casino Filipino Airport, and Duty Free Fiestamall. It then enters Pasay, where the avenue terminates at the intersection with NAIA Road, near the ramps of the NAIA Expressway.

== History ==
The thoroughfare, originally named Imelda Avenue after Filipina first lady Imelda Marcos, was built around 1970. Its stretch from its northern terminus at NAIA Road (formerly MIA Road) to its sharp curve in La Huerta occupies the former right-of-way of the Manila Railroad Company's Paco–Naic branch.

== Intersections ==
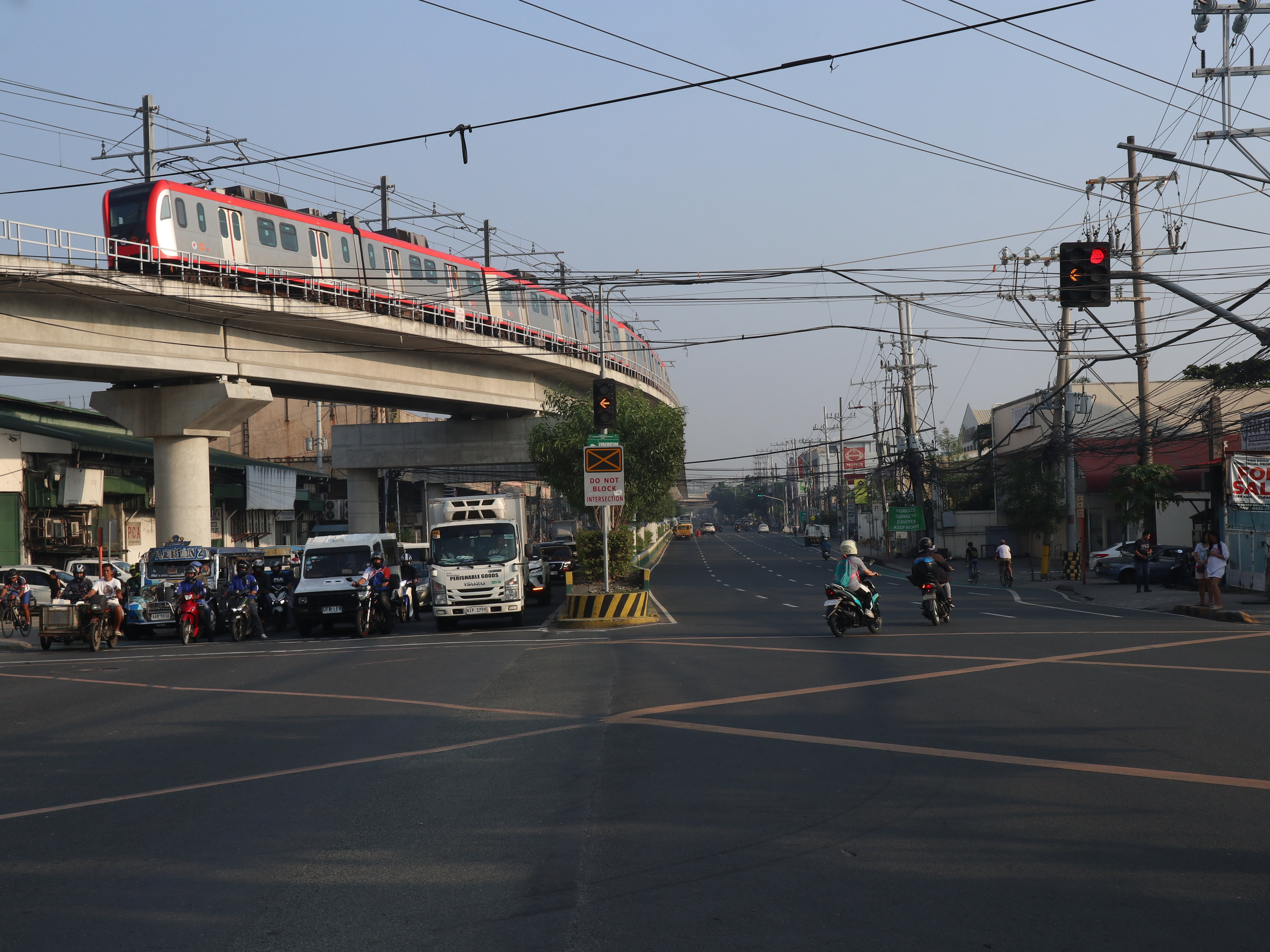
Southern end of the avenue at its intersection with A. Bonifacio Street, with LRT Line 1

| Province | City/Municipality | km | mi | Destinations | Notes |
|---|---|---|---|---|---|
| Pasay | | | | N194 (NAIA Road) | Traffic light intersection. Northern terminus. |
| Pasay | | | | E6 (NAIA Expressway) | Southbound entrance only |
| Pasay | | | | NAIA Terminal 1 | Northbound entrance only. Southbound exit to N195 (NAIA Terminal 1 Flyover) currently limited to motorists from E6 (NAIA Expressway). |
| Pasay – Parañaque boundary | | | | Cut-cut Bridge over Cut-cut Creek | |
| Parañaque | | | | NAIA Terminal 1 | Northbound access only |
| Parañaque | | | | Pascor Drive | Southbound access only |
| Parañaque | | | | E. Rodriguez Street / J.P. Rizal Street | Traffic light intersection. Access to Barangay Santo Niño and N62 (Quirino Avenue). |
| Parañaque | | | | Duty Free Philippines Fiestamall | Traffic light intersection. |
| Parañaque | | | | Multinational Avenue | Former traffic light intersection. No left turn allowed to Ninoy Aquino Avenue from Multinational Avenue. |
| Parañaque | | | | Col. E.L. De Leon Street | Southbound access only |
| Parañaque | | | | Sto. Niño Bridge over Parañaque River | |
| Parañaque | | | | N. de Leon Street | Southbound access only |
| Parañaque | | | | Global Airport Business Park Road | Northbound access only. Access to C-5 Extension. |
| Parañaque | | | | I. Capistrano Street | Southbound access only |
| Parañaque | | | | Amvel City | Traffic light intersection. Access to C-5 Extension. |
| Parañaque | | | | E5 (CAVITEX–C-5 Link) / Victor Medina Street – Kabihasnan, Bacoor, Manila | Traffic light intersection. Access to E5 (CAVITEX–C-5 Link) via Parañaque (Sucat) Interchange. |
| Parañaque | | | | Amvel City | |
| Parañaque | | | | N63 (Dr. Santos Avenue) / A. Bonifacio Street | Traffic light intersection. Southern terminus. Continues south as N63 (Dr. Santos Avenue). |
1.000 mi = 1.609 km; 1.000 km = 0.621 mi: Incomplete access
