= BF Homes Parañaque =

Barangay in Parañaque, Metro Manila, Philippines

BF Homes
- Subdivision and barangay
- Pamahalaang Barangay ng BF Homes
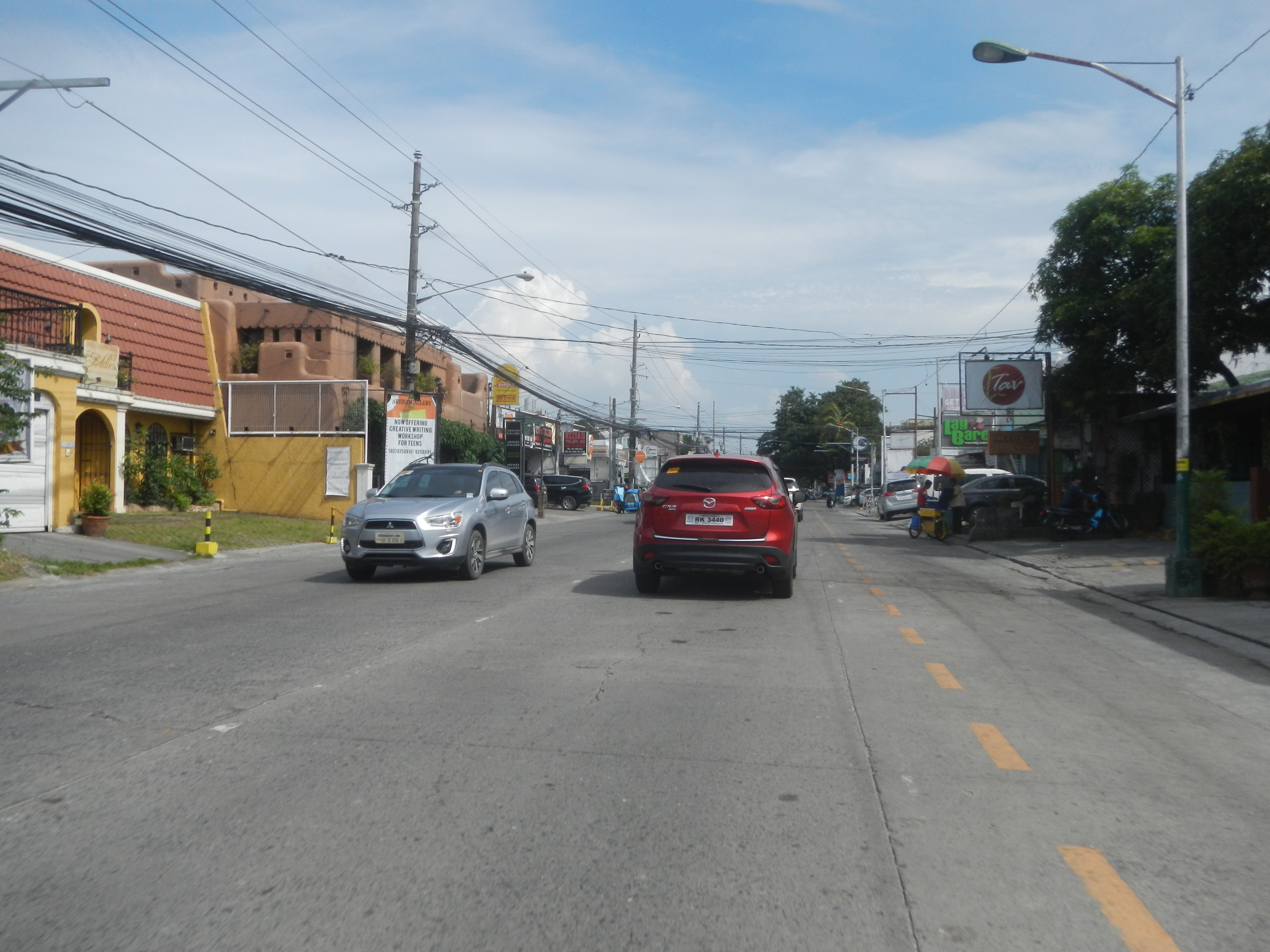
- Aguirre Avenue in BF Homes

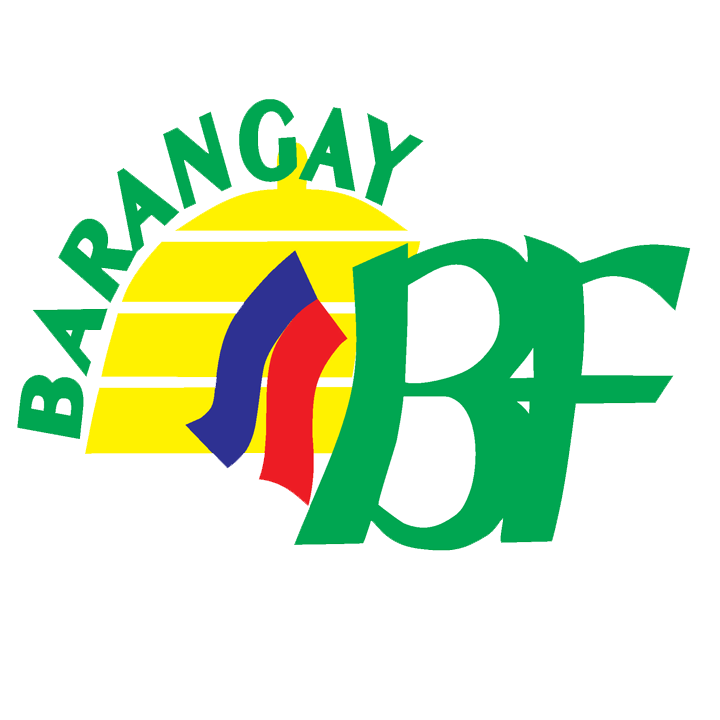
- Seal
- Etymology: Banco Filipino Homes
- Interactive map of BF Homes
- Location within Metro Manila
- Coordinates: 14°27′6.1″N 121°1′29.67″E
- Country: Philippines
- Region: Metro Manila
- City: Parañaque
- Congressional district: Part of the 2nd district of Parañaque

Government
  - Barangay Chairman: Jeremy S. Marquez

Area
  - Total: 7.695 km^{2} (2.971 sq mi)

Population (2020)
  - Total: 92,752
  - Density: 12,050/km^{2} (31,220/sq mi)
- ZIP code: 1718/1720
- Area code: 02

BF Homes Parañaque, officially Barangay BF Homes, is an exclusive gated community and barangay in Parañaque, Metro Manila, Philippines. It is the largest barangay in the city and its southernmost village. As a subdivision, the local term for a gated community, its territory includes portions of neighboring cities, Las Piñas and Muntinlupa. It was formerly known as Las Piñas-Parañaque BF Homes and was developed by Banco Filipino owner Tomas Aguirre in 1968. The development was part of the BF Homes project, alongside its sister branches in Quezon City, Caloocan, and Naga, and became fully operational by early 1970. Philippine media refer to it as "the biggest subdivision in Asia". The larger portion of the development in Parañaque was carved out of the village of San Dionisio to form its own barangay in 1978.

== History ==
=== Development ===
In 1964, Tomas Aguirre, whose family is of the Agencia de Empeños de Aguirre pawnshop fame, founded Banco Filipino with the aid of money from the family business. By around 1966, BF had become the premiere bank in the Philippines. For Aguirre, it was time to venture into the next phase and to consider land development. With that, he put up the BF Homes Incorporated (BFHI) arm to further realize his goal.

Prior to the formation of Ayala Alabang in Muntinlupa, Aguirre already envisioned that a suburban community south of Manila would be ideal, as well as conducive for potential residents that wanted to stay far away from the busy streets of Manila, Makati, and Quezon City, yet hoped to stay close to their work and education, minus the large population. His fortunes from the family business were able to help him invest in 765 hectares (1,890 acres) of agricultural land, mostly from the area of Barrio San Dionisio in Parañaque, as well as that from neighboring Las Piñas and Muntinlupa (all three cities were then municipalities part of the province Rizal until 1975, when they became incorporated into Metro Manila), and formed what became known as the southern branch of BF Homes. The Las Piñas portion was labeled as "Las Piñas BF Homes," while the Parañaque and Muntinlupa portions made up what was labelled as "Parañaque BF Homes." (Simultaneously, Aguirre started work on sister subdivisions—BF Almanza, BF Resort, and Pilar Village—which are all located at Las Piñas.) Property started to go up on sale as soon as it opened in 1968; and by December of the following year, the subdivision had its first annual homeowners meeting at the clubhouse located in 37 Pilar Banzon Street.

=== Height of success ===
For majority of the 1970s, Parañaque BF Homes, as well as Las Piñas BF Homes (by then rechristened as BF Homes International), enjoyed its reputation as the preferred place of residence. It was the first gated community of its kind to have its own convenience store, movie theater, bowling alley, as well as a few commercial complexes; all unheard of at that time. It also featured two premiere hotels developed consecutively by Aguirre's son, Anthony, in the Las Piñas portion; the El Grande Hotel and the Tropical Palace Resort.

In 1978, the Parañaque portion of BF Homes was regrouped with neighboring subdivisions by Presidential Decree 1320 of President Ferdinand Marcos on April 3, 1978, as Barangay BF Homes. Meanwhile, BF Homes International, part of Las Piñas, was still registered under the Parañaque branch for most of the early years.

=== BF Homeowners Association ===
Despite its initial success and adequate security, the quality of the subdivision began to decline at the turn of the late 1970s when informal settlers residing along the nearby Manila Memorial Park – Sucat branch gradually swarmed past its walls. Sometime in 1985, Tomas Aguirre fell out of favor with the Marcos government, and Banco Filipino ceased operations, citing insolvency, causing BFHI to suffer as a result. Consequently, the Aguirre family fled briefly to the United States. On June 30, 1986, the Tropical Palace, a popular venue for the residents, mysteriously burned down. A year after, the El Grande Hotel (almost abandoned for nine years before once again operating, albeit for a few months) was also damaged by fire, though was not as severe. By March 1989, management of BF Homes was then transferred from BFHI to the residents, under the aegis of United BF Homeowners Association Incorporated (UBFHAI); however, despite the turnover, BFHI still retains its shares in the subdivision.

With the residents now in control, clusters of streets in the vicinity were split and fenced from each other, forming their respective associations. This caused the subdivision, which was up until then a large community with streets connecting with one another, to become nothing more than a collective of eighty-two enclaves.

== Demography ==
Year	Population
2007	80,316
2010	83,462
2015	88,035
2020	92,752
2024	96,523

The subdivision, which initially catered to middle class Filipino families, is noted for its high concentration of South Korean expatriates, with local residents saying that every fifth or sixth door has a Korean business behind it such as a restaurant, travel agency, taekwondo gym, or used appliance seller.

== Municipal services ==
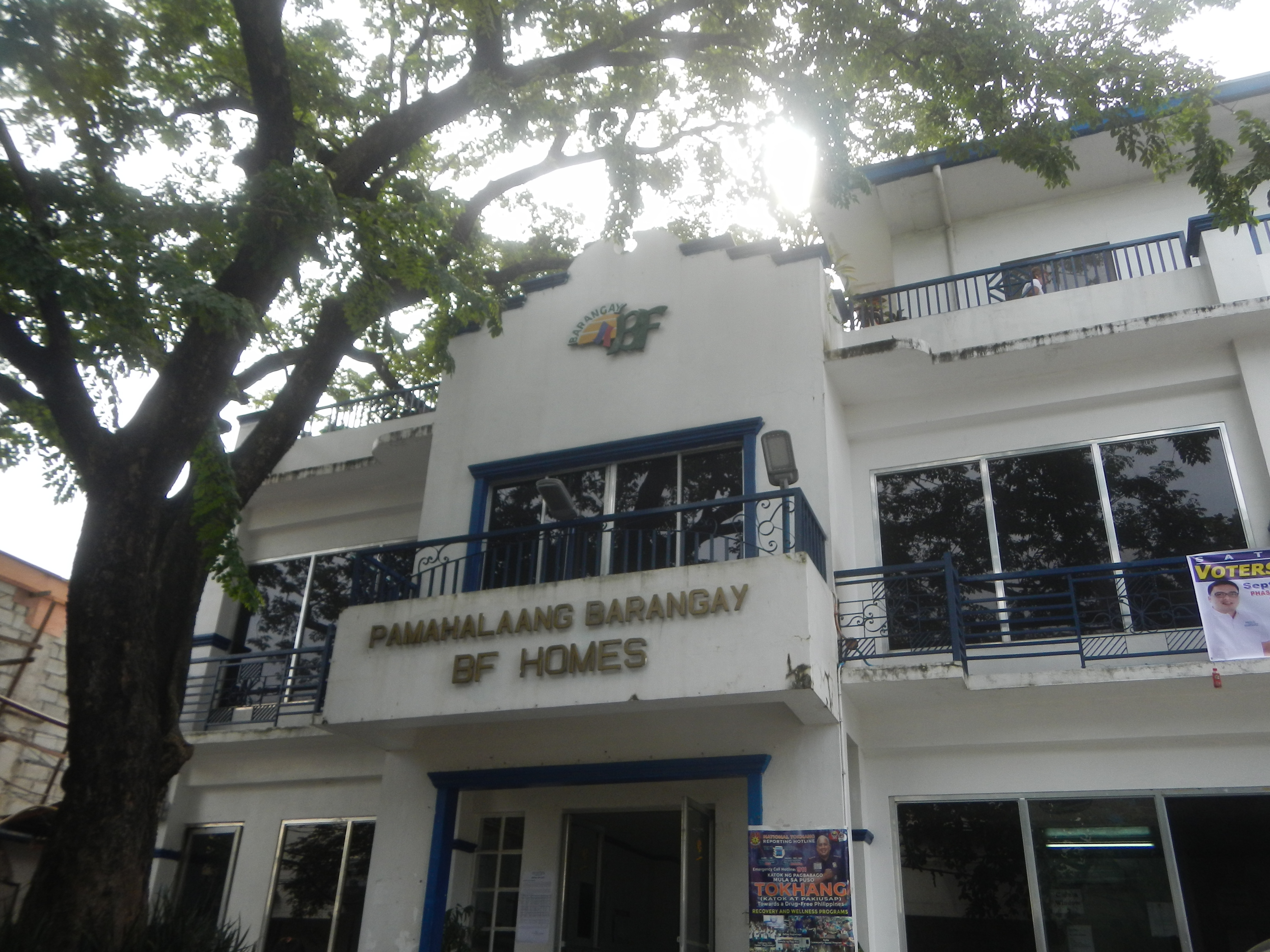
Barangay hall of BF Homes

The subdivision was originally a gated community with strict access but in September 2005, the Muntinlupa Regional Trial Court denied an appeal by the UBFHAI and ordered the opening of the subdivision gates to permit motorists to transit on the roads through the subdivision. This led to worsening security in the area. The municipal government pledged to improve public safety in the aftermath of a 2006 carjacking attempt which left a nursing student dead.

Water supply has also been an ongoing issue in the subdivision. In 2002, Maynilad Water Services cut off the water supply to the Philippine Waterworks Construction Corporation, a subsidiary of BFHI, which owns the pipes in the subdivision, due to non-payment of bills reaching P5 million. In 2007 there were plans to ensure every house had a connection to the Maynilad water supply network. However, by 2008 these plans had stalled due to the high rates which Maynilad proposed, P49 per cubic meter, compared to P28 per cubic meter in 2002.

== Business and economy ==
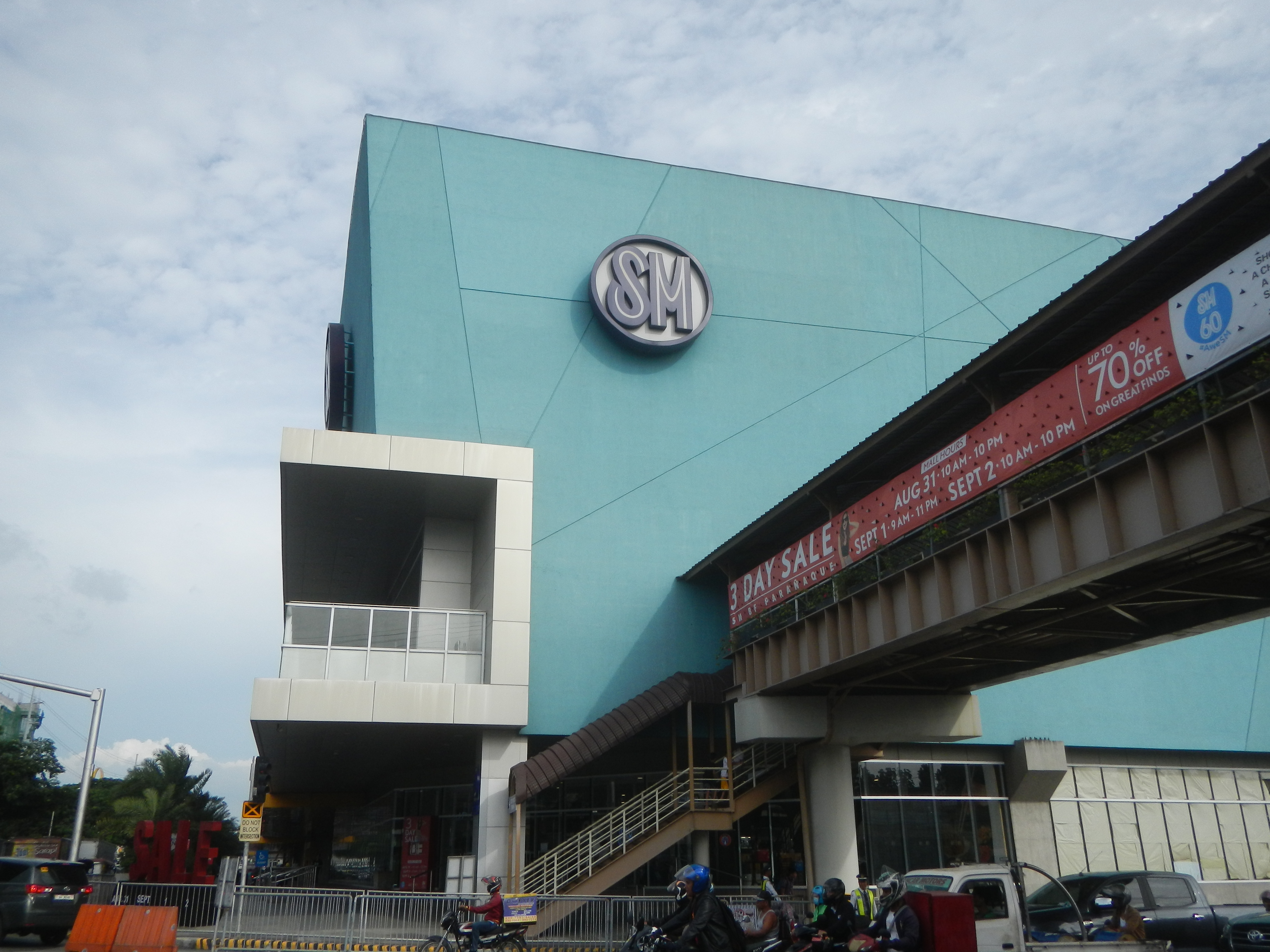
SM City BF Parañaque on Dr. Santos Avenue and President's Avenue

BF Homes Parañaque, in particular Aguirre Avenue, is known as a food hub in Metro Manila, rivaling other famous restaurant districts like the Timog-Morato and Maginhawa areas of Quezon City and Concepcion Dos area of Marikina.

BF also houses SM City BF Parañaque, a shopping mall owned and operated by SM Prime Holdings. Puregold has three branches in BF Homes, namely: Puregold Southpark, Puregold Aguirre, and Puregold Jr. (at Phase 3, along Aguirre Avenue). Robinsons Townville, a community mall by Robinsons Retail Holdings, has a branch located adjacent to a BF Homes gate near Aguirre Avenue's eastern end; it features a Robinsons Supermarket branch.
