= San Isidro, Parañaque =

Barangay in Parañaque, Metro Manila, Philippines

San Isidro
- Barangay
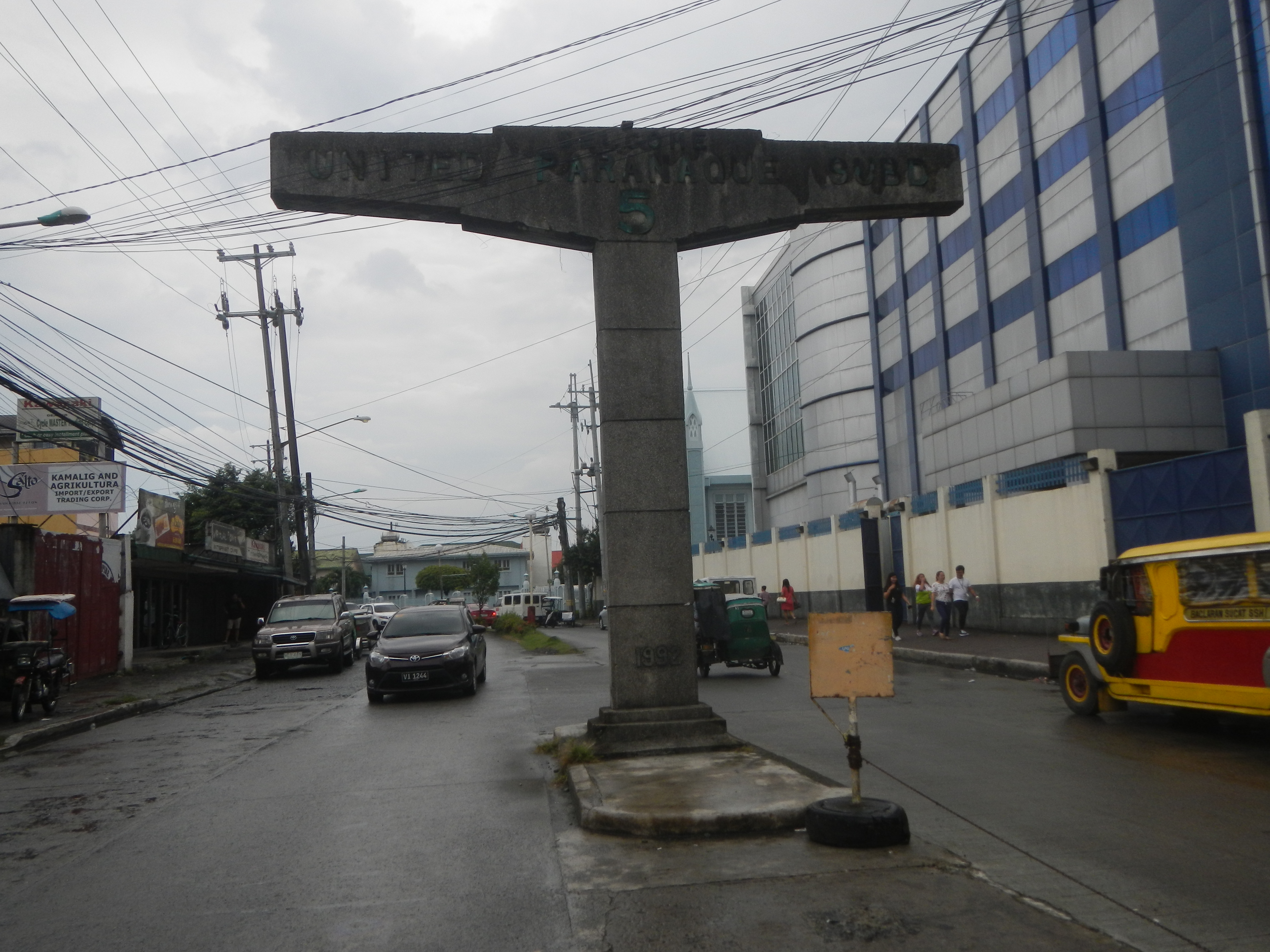
- Entrance to United Parañaque Subdivision 5
- Map
- Location within Metro Manila
- Coordinates: 14°28′6.77″N 121°0′42.61″E
- Country: Philippines
- Region: National Capital Region
- City: Parañaque
- District: Part of the 1st district of Parañaque
- Established: April 3, 1978
- Named for: Isidore the Laborer

Government
  - Type: Barangay
  - Barangay Captain: Noel P. Japlos

Area
  - Total: 3.6522 km^{2} (1.4101 sq mi)

Population (2020)
  - Total: 79,372
  - Density: 21,733/km^{2} (56,287/sq mi)
- Time zone: UTC+8 (PST)

San Isidro is a barangay in Parañaque, Metro Manila, Philippines with a population of 79,372 as of the 2020 census.

== History ==
Barangay San Isidro was established on April 3, 1978 through Presidential Decree No. 1323. The subdivisions of Clarmen Village, Lopez Village, Parañaque Greenheights, Salvador Estate, San Antonio Valley 2, 6, 12, 15, and Villa Mendoza were separated from Barangay San Dionisio to form San Isidro.

== Demographics ==
Year	Population
2007	60,405
2010	69,035
2015	78,912
2020	79,372
2024	78,765

== Subdivisions ==
While Barangays are the administrative divisions of the city and are legally part of the addresses of establishments and homes of many residents indicate their Subdivision (village) instead of their Barangay.

== See also ==
- PATTS College of Aeronautics
