= BF Homes Caloocan =

Barangay in Caloocan, Metro Manila, Philippines

- Barangay
- Seal
- Interactive map of BF Homes Caloocan
- Location within Metro Manila
- Coordinates: 14°43′55.5″N 121°1′11.4″E
- Country: Philippines
- Region: National Capital Region
- City: Caloocan
- District: 1st Legislative district of Caloocan
- Established: 1970s

Government
  - Type: Barangay
  - Barangay Captain: Divine Gatchalian

Population (2020)
  - Total: 4,887
- Time zone: UTC+8 (PST)
- Postal Code: 1422
- Area code: 02

Barangay BF Homes Caloocan or Barangay 169 is a barangay of Caloocan, Metro Manila, Philippines. The barangay is known for having jurisdiction of the larger portions of the Banco Filipino-developed real estate projects in Northern Manila, and is considered the most affluent barangay in Caloocan.

== History ==
The villages occupies parts of land historically part of Tala Estate, which was under the jurisdiction of the town of Novaliches before it was absorbed by Caloocan in 1903. Novaliches had an area of 200 to 300 square meters (2,200 to 3,200 sq ft). Upon the creation of Quezon City in 1939, the Novaliches district was divided into two: a portion under the jurisdiction of Caloocan and Quezon City. In the Caloocan city charter of 1962, the geographical location of the current barangay which is part of Novaliches, is among portions ceded to Caloocan.

In 1964, Tomas Aguirre, whose family is of the Agencia de Empeños de Aguirre pawnshop fame, founded Banco Filipino with the aid of money from the family business. By around 1966, BF had become the premiere bank in the Philippines. Aguirre, figured that with such earnings, it was time to venture into the next phase and to consider land development. With that, he put up the BF Homes Incorporated (BFHI) arm to further realize his goal.

In the barangay regrouping, Barangay BF Homes Caloocan included other real estate developments: Estrella Homes and Santa Fe Homesite.

In recent history, BF Homes is where the 2007 oath-taking of Antonio Trillanes IV as a senator occurred, wherein, as resident, his oath was administered by the barangay chairperson. Also, the suspected Communist Leader, Andrea Rosal, was arrested together with several others in a house in this barangay.

=== Proposed merger ===
In 1989, Republic Act No. 6714 was enacted to reduce the number of barangays in Caloocan from 188 to 60. As part of this plan, Barangay 167 and 169 were slated to be merged to become Barangay Llano. A plebiscite was held on March 10; with only 10% of the city's voters participating. Majority of the participated voters reportedly opposed the proposal, thus the existing barangays continued as independent entities.

== Geography ==
The barangay is located in North Caloocan. The Meycauayan River estuaries flows along the western borders of the barangay, separating it from Barangay Llano. To its north lies Barangay Deparo, and its southern and eastern borders are shared with barangays of Quezon City.

== Schools ==
The barangay has jurisdiction over a public daycare institution, and three private K12 schools.

- Binhi Day Care Center
- Holy Infant Montessori Center
- TMW International Academy
- Academy of Saint Andrew - Caloocan

== Places of Worship ==
- Christ the King Parish Church BF Homes
- Life in the Word Christian Church
