= Sucat Thermal Power Plant =

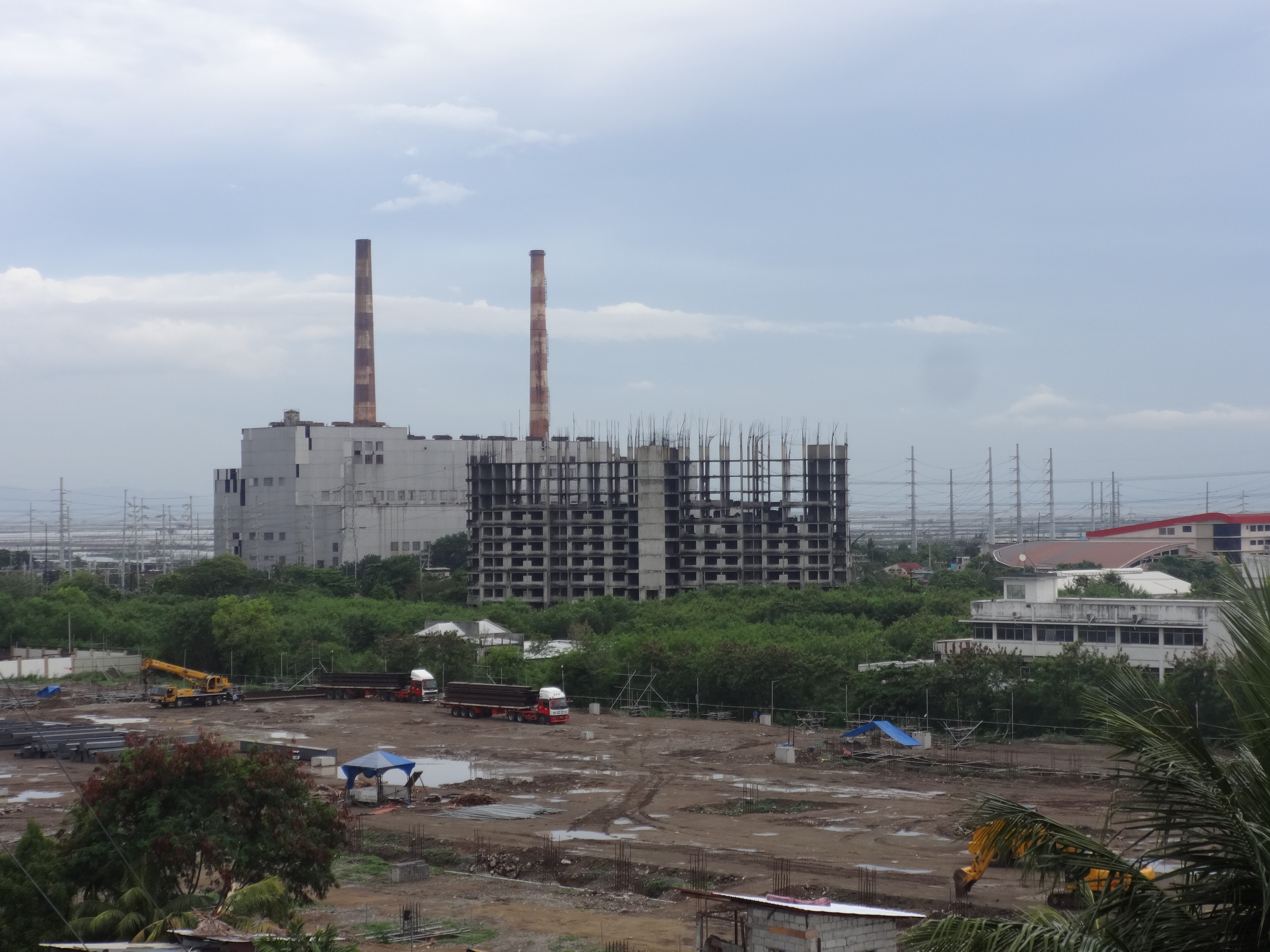
- The Sucat Thermal Power Plant in 2017
- Country: Philippines
- Location: Muntinlupa
- Coordinates: 14°26′51″N 121°3′7″E
- Status: Decommissioned
- Commission date: 1968
- Decommission date: 2002
- Owner: National Power Corporation

Thermal power station
- Primary fuel: Oil

Power generation
- Units decommissioned: 4
- Nameplate capacity: 850 MW

External links
- Commons: Related media on Commons

Sucat Thermal Power Plant was an oil-fired steam turbine plant in Muntinlupa commissioned in 1968 and fully decommissioned in 2002. The land occupied by the facility was planned to be auctioned by the government to private bidders in late 2015 or early 2016 on the condition that the property would remain a power-generation site. Rehabilitation of the facility was considered but later abandoned after it was deemed too costly to recommission the plant compared to constructing a new one, and the facility is already flooded.

== History ==
Known formerly as the Gardner Snyder Thermal Plant, the Sucat Thermal Power Plant was commissioned on August 1, 1968, when Unit 1 of the facility was completed. Additional units were built on January 15, 1970, July 1, 1971, and July 31, 1972. In November 1978, the National Power Corporation acquired the facility from Meralco.

=== Decommissioning ===
In January 2000, Units 1 and 4 were decommissioned but preserved. Units 2 and 3 were decommissioned at a later time in January 2002. The Sucat Thermal Power Plant was decommissioned due to its emissions exceeding the limits set by the Clean Air Act.

The plant is being demolished since 2017, and only the two chimneys (popularly nicknamed "Stick-O" after the brand of barquillo-derived snack) and the exterior trusses remain as of 2019.

By mid-2019, scaffolding was set up around the plant for further demolition. Both of the chimneys are no longer visible.

== Redevelopment ==
In documents regarding the PNR South Long Haul project, it is stated that the area will be rebuilt into the new Sucat station. The line will serve the North–South Commuter Railway and the new Bicol Express service.
