= Sucat station =

Railway station in Muntinlupa, Philippines

Sucat
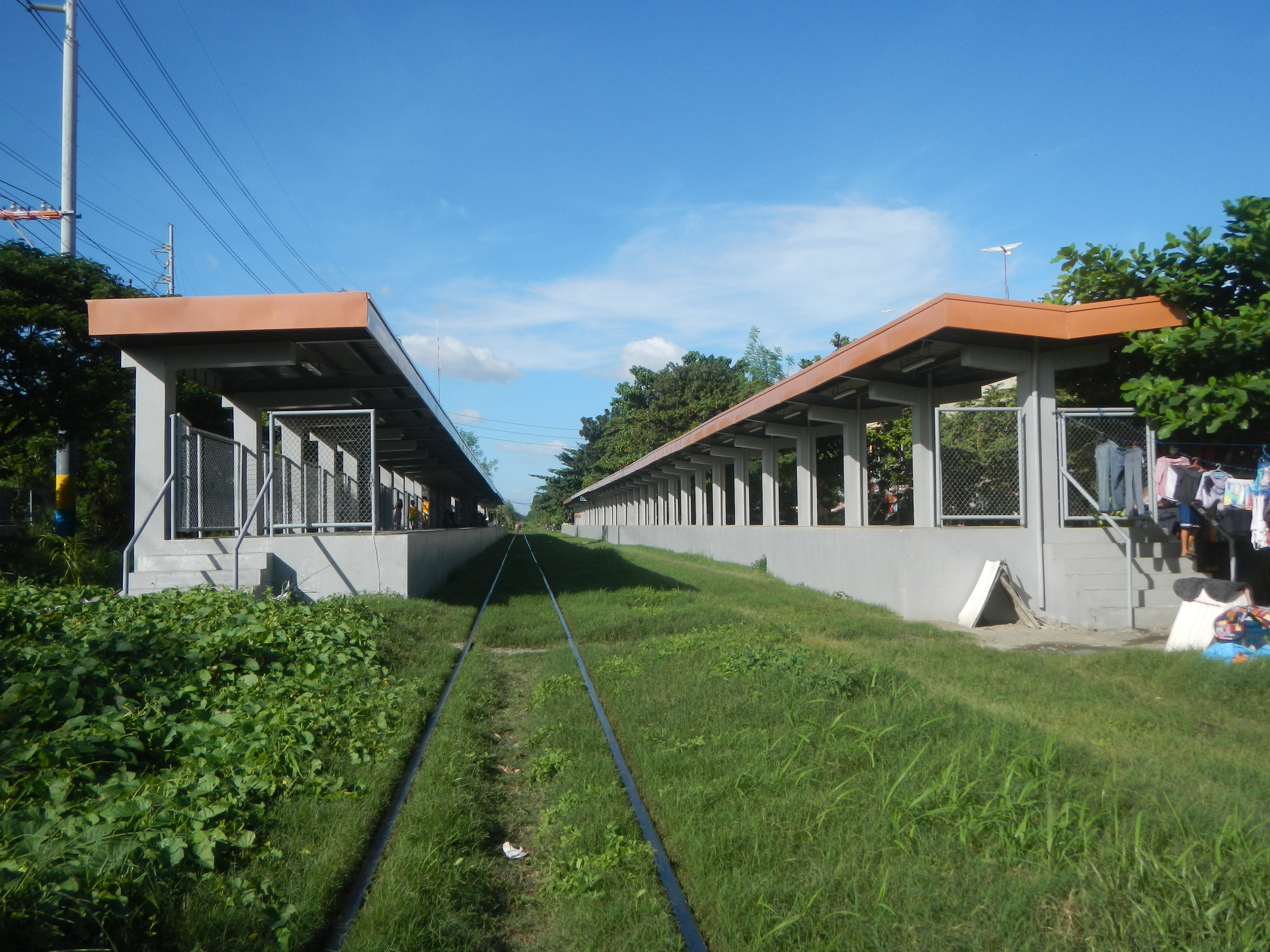
- Sucat station in 2017

General information
- Location: Meralco Road, Sucat; Muntinlupa, Metro Manila; Philippines
- Coordinates: 14°27′7.70″N 121°3′3.36″E
- Owner: Philippine National Railways
- Operator: Philippine National Railways
- Lines: South Main Line; Planned: South Commuter
- Platforms: 1 side platform and 1 island platform
- Tracks: 2
- Connections: Jeepneys and buses

Construction
- Structure type: At grade
- Parking: No
- Cycle facilities: No
- Accessible: Yes

Other information
- Station code: SU

History
- Opened: June 21, 1908
- Rebuilt: c. 1940s, 1978, 2010, 2017

Services
Preceding station	PNR	Following station
Bicutan towards Tutuban	Metro South Commuter	Alabang towards IRRI
Future services
Preceding station	PNR	Following station
FTI towards Clark International Airport	Airport Limited Express	Alabang Terminus
Bicutan towards Clark International Airport	NSCR Commuter CIA–Calamba	Alabang towards Calamba
Bicutan towards Tutuban	Commuter Express Tutuban–Calamba	Alabang towards Calamba
FTI towards Clark International Airport	Commuter Express CIA–Calamba	Alabang towards Calamba
FTI towards Tutuban	Commuter Express Tutuban–Calamba	Alabang towards Calamba
Terminus	SLH Local Sucat–Batangas Port	Banlic towards Batangas Passenger Terminal
Terminus	SLH Local Sucat–Lucena	Banlic towards Lucena
Terminus	SLH Local Sucat–Matnog	Banlic towards Matnog
Terminus	SLH Bicol Express (After 2030)	San Pablo towards Matnog
Preceding station	Manila MRT	Following station
Bicutan towards East Valenzuela	Metro Manila Subway	Alabang towards Calamba
Location
- Location within Metro Manila Location within Luzon Location within Philippines

Sucat station is a railway station located on the South Main Line in Muntinlupa, Metro Manila, Philippines. It was originally established by the Manila Railway Company in 1908 as part of the construction of the original Southern Lines to the province of Tayabas, since renamed Quezon. It is also the southernmost area on the PNR Metro Commuter Line to be upgraded to double track as a result of a proposed electrification scheme in 1978.

With the construction of the Luzon Rail System, a series of standard-gauge railways throughout Luzon, it is proposed to be one of two interchange stations between the PNR South Long Haul and the North–South Commuter Railway. The present station will be rebuilt into the former's passenger terminus while the NSCR station will be built atop the former Sucat Thermal Power Plant.

== History ==
Sucat was initially opened under the regime of the Manila Railway Company in 1908, a London-based private limited company and the first incarnation of the Philippine National Railways. It also happened prior to the gradual acquisition by then-privately owned Manila Railroad Company of New Jersey. It was then later rehabilitated after the destruction of much of Manila during World War II. In 1978, the Japan International Cooperation Agency proposed the electrification of PNR's commuter services in Metro Manila. Although the electrification plan was never realized, it allowed Sucat to gain access to more frequent services as it allowed for the construction of a double-track line leading to the station.

Despite scaling back in operations in the 2010s with the latest cutting on Bicol-bound trains, the PNR continues to operate this station to date. However, a third siding track used on the eastern island platform has been long removed. The most recent renovation was in 2017 when the PNR fenced off an open yard previously used as parking space for jeepneys into an off-limits green space and the entire platform has been covered by roof.

=== Future plans ===
Under PNR general manager Junn Magno's term, the Luzon Rail System was announced. It is a series of lines that will reconstruct the old narrow-gauge network which has since been dilapidated into the wider standard gauge. The move was made because it allows better access to technology from international suppliers, which in turn means faster trains and more frequent service according to the National Economic and Development Authority.

Under this program, the new station will have two buildings. The first to be built is the North–South Commuter Railway station building. It will be built over the decommissioned Sucat Thermal Power Plant, having been demolished in 2019. It will be accessed by a siding-like short line and will merge with the PNR right-of-way upon exit. This would allow electrified trains to go towards the direction of Calamba station in Laguna. The second will be the PNR South Long Haul station building which will be built over the present one as part of Phase 4. It will serve as the passenger terminus of the line with only freight trains being allowed to pass north to the rest of the PNR Metro Commuter Line, heading towards the direction of the Manila North Harbor once a post-Phase 4 reconstruction has been announced.

The NSCR station will be an elevated station while the design for the South Long Haul one is yet to be determined. The two lines however will not share tracks.

In March 2021, PNR added Sucat as one of the stops for its proposed Airport Limited Express service.

== Transportation links ==
Sucat station is accessible by jeepneys plying the Meralco Road and Dr. Santos Avenue routes. A jeepney terminal is located immediately outside the station. The station is also accessible by buses plying the South Luzon Expressway which stop in Sucat.

An indirect connection to the LRT Line 6 has also been proposed by a private-backed firm via Lake Front station under Phase 6C.
