= Parañaque National High School =

- Mataas na Paaralang Pambansa ng Parañaque
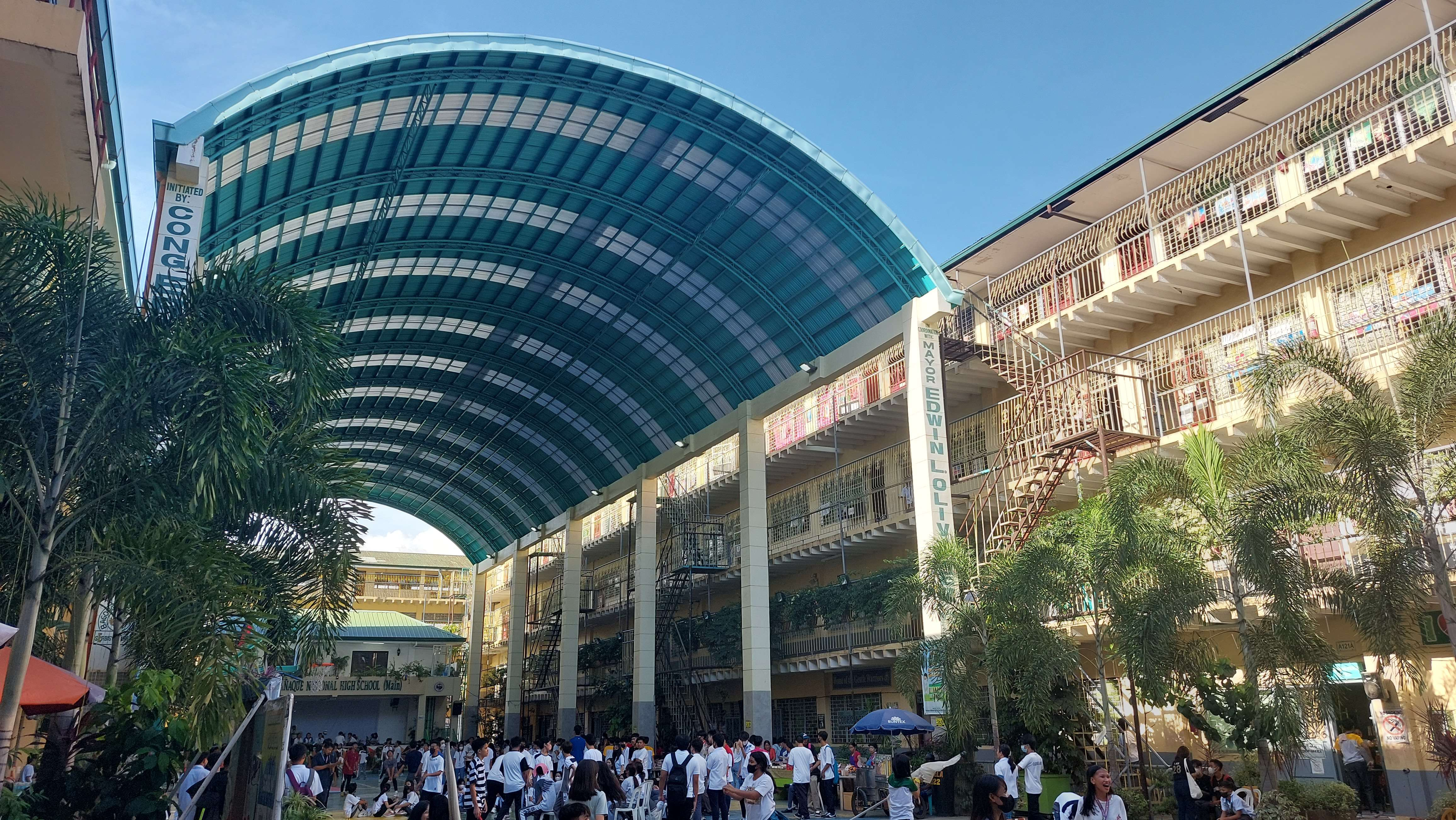
- PNHS-Main Quadrangle

Location
- Kay Talise St. Dr. Santos Avenue, San Dionisio; National Capital Region; Parañaque, Metro Manila; Philippines; 14.4794°N 120.9986°E

Information
- Former name: Parañaque Municipal High School
- Motto: Creating Opportunities, Inspiring Excellence (Official); Home of the Gentle Warriors
- Established: February 24, 1969
- Founders: Mayor Florencio B. Bernabe, Sr.; Vice Mayor Bienvenido A. Galang
- Status: Active
- School district: VIII (PNHS-MAIN)
- School code: 305424
- Principal: Gerry A. Lumaban
- Grades: 7 to 12
- Language: English and Filipino
- Area: 12,500 m^{2} (135,000 sq ft)
- Colors: Green and white
- Song: PNHS Alma Mater
- Newspaper: The Spark (English Publication); Ang Dagitab (Filipino Publication)
- Affiliations: Division of Parañaque City
- Website: pnhsmain.depedparanaquecity.com

Parañaque National High School (abbreviated as PNHS; Filipino: Mataas na Paaralang Pambansa ng Parañaque) formerly known as Parañaque Municipal High School is a secondary public school, classified as a comprehensive national high school, whose main campus is located at Kay Talise Street and Dr. A. Santos Avenue, San Dionisio, Parañaque. Aside from the main campus in San Dionisio; the school currently has annexes in Baclaran and San Isidro. It also has nine former annexes located in Baclaran, Don Bosco, Don Galo, La Huerta, Marcelo Green, San Martin de Porres, San Antonio, Sto. Niño and Tambo; all independent from the school administration. The main campus of the school is notable for having one of the largest school populations in the Philippines and even in Asia. It was established on February 24, 1969, and made into a national high school by virtue of RA No. 7841 on July 25, 1994. The current principal of the main campus is Eduardo M. Taguiam, Principal II.

== History ==
=== Early history/ Angela Samson and Rosario Soriano era (February 1969-October 1986) ===
Parañaque National High School was established in 1969 through an initiative by Lourdes M. Bernabe, wife of then Mayor Florencio B. Bernabe Sr. The school was established by renting the Nery Building near Bonifacio Street, Kabihasnan with only 19 teachers and 512 first year high school students under the management of Ma'am Angelita "Ka Lita" R. Samson; the first school principal. The school is considered as the first public high school in the then-municipality of Parañaque.

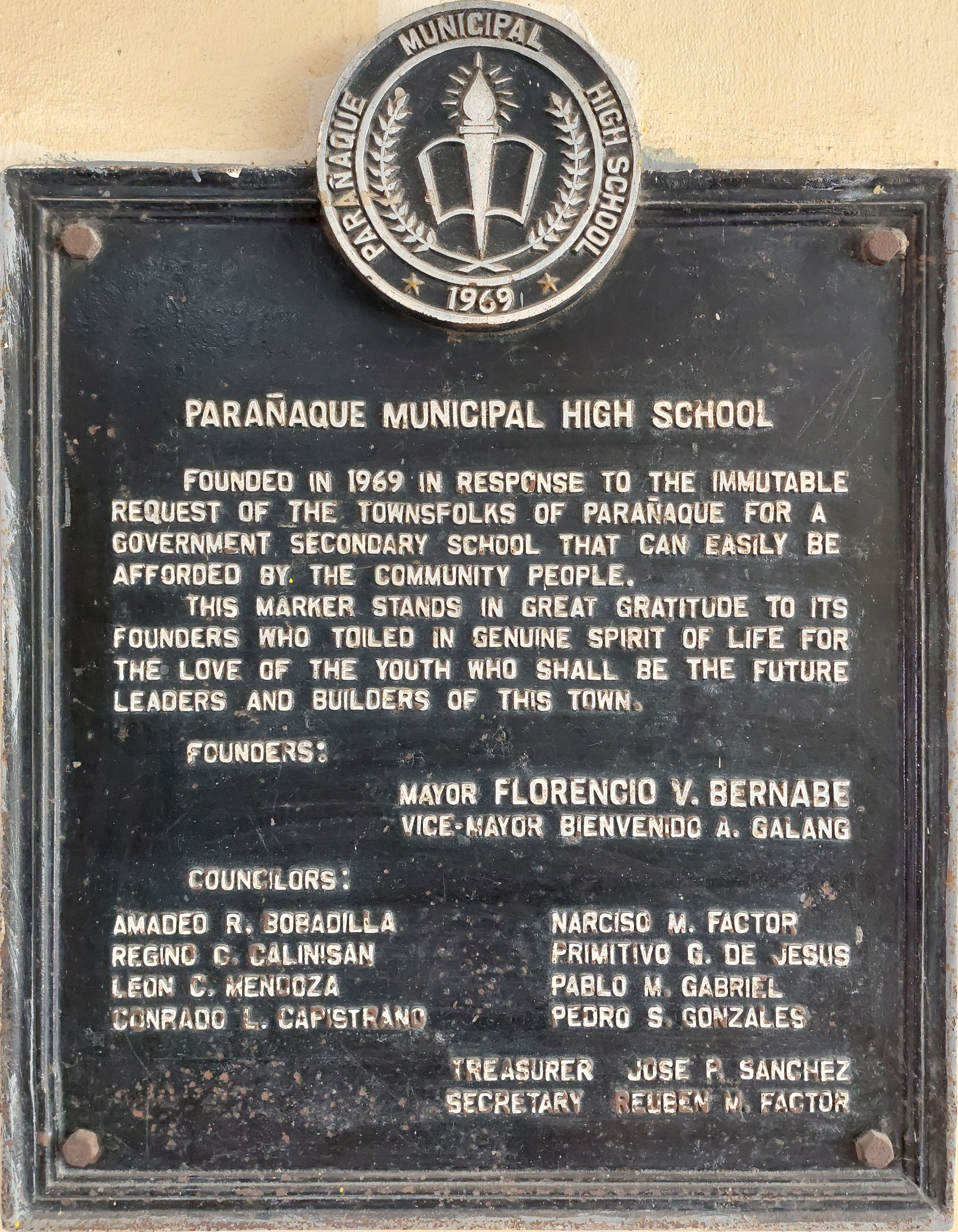
Historical Marker of School

The school transferred to its current location beside Villanueva Creek near the then two-lane Dr. Arcadio Santos Avenue (Sucat Road) in 1973 in order to accommodate the increasing number of enrollees. The new school building featured a bas-relief made by Eugenio R. Bunuan and initially had an L-shaped layout if seen from the sky. The surrounding area during that time was mostly composed of salt farms and rice fields.

The first set of graduates graduated in 1973, with two valedictorians and two salutatorians. One set of highest ranking graduates came from the regular program and the other set came from the vocational program. This system of having two valedictorians and salutatorians remained until 1975. From 1976 to 2005, the school only had one valedictorian and one salutatorian per batch.

The school continued in increasing in population, especially with an influx of migrants coming from the provinces seeking work in the newly-formed and industrializing Metro Manila. This prompted the school to expand the original building and add new ones, surrounding the quadrangle by three sides.

Samson remained the principal for 16 years, only to retire at the mandatory retirement age of 65. During her time as principal, the current Department of Education reorganized and changed names multiple times as part of administrative and structural changes: Department of Education and Culture in 1975; Ministry of Education and Culture in 1978; and Ministry of Education, Culture and Sports in 1984. Rosario M. Soriano succeeded Angelita Samson in 1985.

Soriano's key project was the addition of open classrooms for the home economics class, built with the assistance of the Municipal OIC (Officer-in-Charge) Rodolfo Buenavista. Soriano retired as principal the next year.

=== Expansion/ Rosa Sioson and Estrella Aseron era (October 1986-August 2006) ===
In 1986, Rosa V. Sioson became the third principal and began as OIC from her former position as former head of the English Department and as OIC/Assistant Principal. The school initially faced multiple issues during this time: understaffed school faculties, salary disputes, sanitary and structural concerns, and the then approximately 10,000 student population. Because of this, then-mayor Walfrido N. Ferrer and his councilmen had approved appropriations for the construction and rental of the buildings to accommodate the increasing number of students. A 24-point project was also established for the school, of which it included the construction of an 18-room-three-storey building. This was done with the help of then mayor Pablo R. Olivarez.

The Ministry of Education, Culture and Sports was reformed again in 1987; changing its name to the Department of Education, Culture, and Sports.

The school established annexes across the municipality as the number of enrollees increased. These annexes were La Huerta (1989), PNHS-Baclaran (1991), San Martin de Porres (1993) and a science high school: Parañaque Science High School (1990). An OIC/Assistant Principal has been assigned to the annexes: Presencia Damian in PNHS-Baclaran, Narcisa F. Catindig in La Huerta, Urbano Agustin in San Martin de Porres, and Elizabeth Cabales in Parañaque Science. All OICs functioned as the immediate head of their respective annexes and were department heads of the school.

PMHS started its process in becoming a national high school in 1989. It was recognized as a national high school by virtue of RA no. 7841 on July 25, 1994; however, the school still used the name "Parañaque Municipal High School" up until the early 2000s. Parañaque Science High School became independent the same year, however the school occupied a building within the school grounds until its transfer to Sto. Niño in 2011.

In 1993, the school added what would become the current Science, Technology, and Engineering (STE) Program. Initially called the Engineering and Science Education Program (ESEP), the school was one of the first 12 schools in NCR to offer such program. The first few students of the program were taken from the upper two sections from first year up to fourth year. The teachers of the program were asked to take a Certificate or Diploma Program in the sciences or mathematics from either De La Salle University-Manila (DLSU-M) or Philippine Normal University (PNU). The first graduates of the program graduated the next year.

The School of the Future (SOF) Building was built during this time, covering the old façade of the school and expanding the lobby. The school quadrangle was now enclosed by four buildings as the now-called East Quisumbing Building was extended further to the South Quisumbing Building and these buildings were collectively called Building A.

Doctor Arcadio Santos National High School became independent in 2000. This former annex would in turn have three former annexes as well: Masville National High School (1997), Moonwalk National High School (2005), and Sun Valley National High School (2008).

The Department of Education, Culture, and Sports was renamed into the Department of Education by virtue of RA no. 9155 in 2001. Rosa V. Sioson's retired at the age of 65 in the same year. The school was headed by an officer-in-charge for a few months from late 2001 until early 2002.

Estella C. Aseron, former head of the Mathematics Department, succeeded Sioson by becoming officer-in-charge then becoming principal. Beautification projects were initiated such as the "Adopt-An Area" program, with each school department adopting and then beautifying an area of the school. The Basic Education Curriculum was implemented a few months later; streamlining and reforming the education system.

Baclaran National High School (not to be confused with Parañaque National High School-Baclaran) was established in 2002 as an annex of Parañaque National High School-Main, thus adding another high school in Baclaran.

The system of having two valedictorians and two salutatorians was revived in 2006, this time one set came from the DOST/ Special Science Program and the other came from the regular program. This system lasted until 2015 because of the transition to the K-12 program.

=== Urbano Agustin era (August 2006-October 2014) ===
Urbano E. Agustin came from Dr. Arcadio Santos National High School, a former annex of Parañaque National High School-Main. He assumed office at August 2006. He is the first male principal of the school.

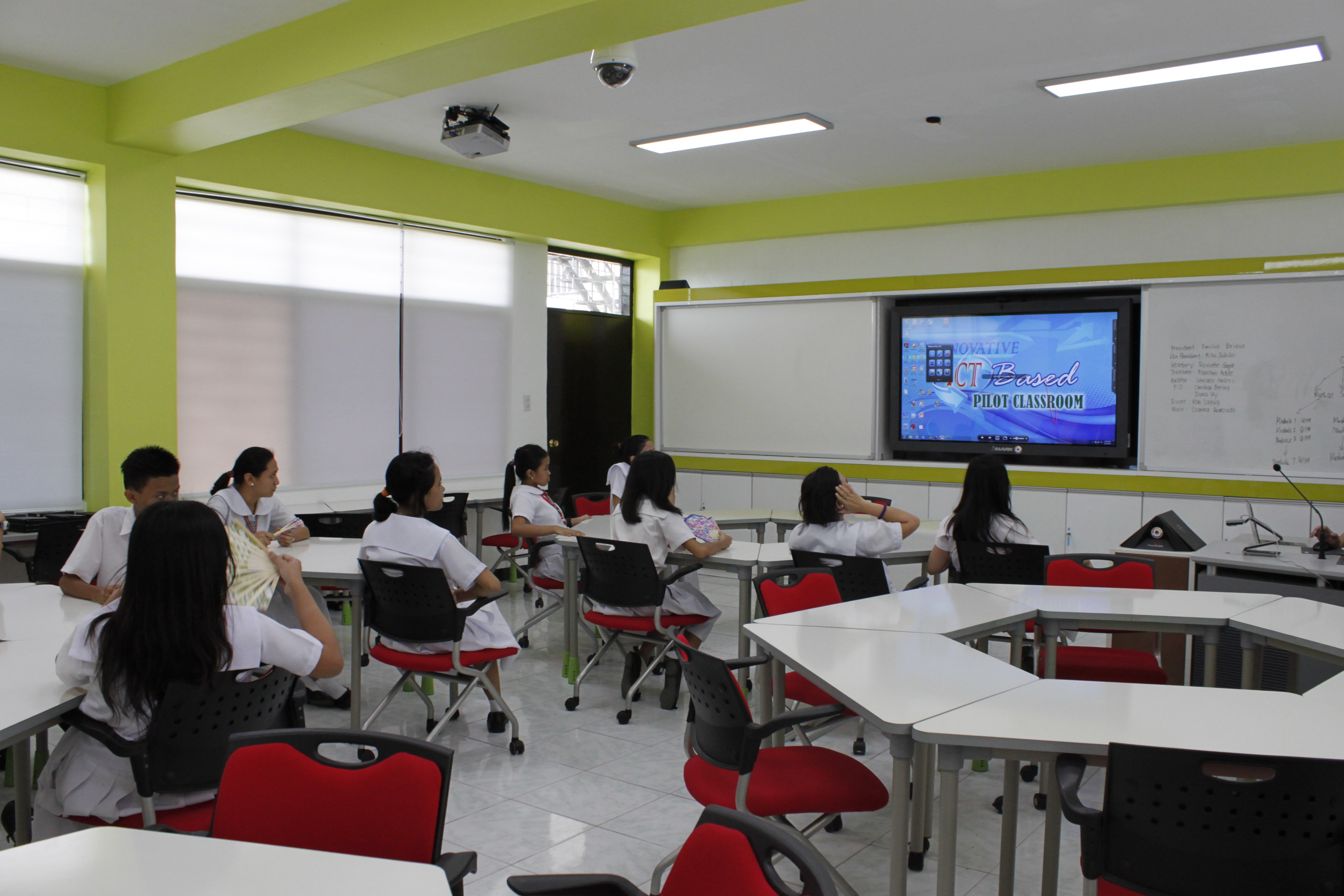
Innovative ICT Based Pilot Classroom

The school was given major renovations during that time such as air conditioned and newly renovated faculty rooms for faculty members. A number of function rooms were also created: speech laboratory, science laboratories, English reading center, dance room, glee club room, Filipino resource center and computer rooms. Lapus Building was constructed and the SOF Building was expanded during his time as principal.

The school experienced an influx of students especially from transferees from private schools and the provinces. Even though there was a steady increase of students and crowding was a problem, the school was able to have vacant classrooms especially in anticipation of the Senior High School Program.

The first batch of grade 7 students entered the school premises instead of first year students of the old system in the SY 2012–2013 because of the change from the Basic Education Curriculum program to the K-12 program, with the program set into law in 2013 by virtue of RA no. 10533. The older grade level system under the old curriculum was slowly being phased out for the newer grade level system under the junior high school program.

Tambo National High School (2007), Sto. Niño National High School (2012), and Don Bosco High School Parañaque (2013) were established as annexes of the school during that era. Baclaran National High School became independent from the school in 2009. Parañaque Science High School transferred to its current location in Sto. Niño in 2011.

He retired from his position in October 2014 at the age of 65.

=== Rosendo Abulog era (October 2014-July 2018) ===
Dr. Rosendo C. Abulog, like his predecessor Sir Agustin, also came from Doctor Arcadio Santos National High School-Main. He assumed office at October 28, 2014.

The last batch of students under the former Basic Education Curriculum of 2002 graduated in 2015. The next school year, the first batch of grade 10 students had a different End of School Year rite instead of graduation. The students completed their junior high school year with a moving up program, being issued a junior high school diploma as proof of completion. There were two students who gained the highest honors, one coming from the then Science, Technology, Engineering, and Mathematics Program and the other from the regular program.

Instead of the first batch directly entering college as the previous batches did, the first set of moving-up completers entered the senior high school program instead during school year 2016-2017. The school has two highest honors per batch in the system; one from the regular program and the other from the science, technology, and engineering program. At said school year, the school had a population of approximately 12,000 students.

The Luistro Building was built and was named after the secretary of Education that time. The school implemented the senior high school program as part of the K-12 curriculum that was being implemented by the Department of Education. This led to the sudden increase in the number of students in the school. The school gymnasium was also demolished and Briones Building was built in its place, the building being named after the secretary of Education that time.

New school uniforms, with distinct uniforms for junior and senior high school students, were implemented by the school during SY 2016–2017. The new uniforms use a blue and green plaid pattern instead of the plain white color uniforms used in the old uniform. The senior high school uniforms differ from the junior high school counterpart by having epaulettes for the male uniform and a slimmer fit for the female uniform.

Parañaque National High School- Marcelo Green was established in 2015. A number of annexes became independent from the school during the time, and these are Don Galo National High School (2015), La Huerta National High School (2016), Sto. Niño National High School (2016), Don Bosco High School Parañaque (2017), San Antonio National High School (2017), and Tambo National High School (2018).

The first batch of K-12 graduates of the school graduated in school year 2017–2018, with 719 graduates coming from the senior high school program. Instead of the graduation rites being held normally at the school quadrangle, the first graduation under the new system took place at the nearby New Barangay San Dionisio Sports Complex since the school quadrangle was unusable during that time. The school only had one valedictorian per batch in the new system and still remains to this day.

=== Gerry Lumaban era (July 2018-September 2026) ===
Gerry Lumaban came from San Antonio Elementary School. He assumed office on July 9, 2018.

The school continued its reconstruction efforts, building new school buildings that hosted classrooms. The school quadrangle was covered by a roof and the size of the quadrangle decreased because of the construction of new buildings at one side of the school. Both Gonzales Building and Roco Building were both built during his tenure as principal. The school quadrangle was elevated by filling it and the school stage was replaced by a bigger and higher-elevated stage. Beautification efforts were commenced around the school premises with the addition of plant boxes, plant beds, and even a fountain.

Other programs initiated by the school is the Spark UP program that aims to combat illiteracy among students and the Gulayan sa Paaralan (transl. Vegetable Garden at School) program that aims to promote vegetable production within school grounds to combat malnutrition was expanded further by incorporating aquaponics.

Parañaque National High School- San Isidro, was established in 2019 as the latest annex of the school and the youngest high school in the city. In contrast, Marcelo Green National High School became independent from the school in 2022.

The school celebrated its golden anniversary in 2019, with the theme "Golden Years of Performance Excellence". The programs involved in the 50th anniversary of the school was the donation of 50 LED Televisions by different organizations and an alumni homecoming by many former school batches.

The school was one of the first schools in the country to spearhead the return of face-to-face classes through the "HyLearn Learning" Program; which is a hybridized learning modality, combining the traditional face-to-face modality of teaching to online learning. This system was also implemented in other public schools in Parañaque. The school returned hosting face-to-face Junior High School and Senior High School Commencement Exercises from the June 28 to 30, 2022. Both junior high school and senior high school completers who volunteered to participate were split into batches in order to reduce contagion. The next school year, the school returned to face-to-face classes on its first day; with students being divided into two sets, each set going to school on an alternating schedule; this set-up lasted up to November 2022 as per a directive that ordered all public schools to return to face-to-face classes.

In May 2023, it was announced that Quisumbing North building and Marquez building are both slated for demolition in order to construct a new school building. The proposed school building has 60 rooms and is a 10-story building inspired by Gabaldon school building architecture.

In school year 2023-2024, the number of students of the school ballooned from the previously approximately 17,000 students during the last school year to approximately 18,500. This makes the school one of the largest in the country in terms of population.

The school added another Junior High School program, the Special Program for Foreign Language and Journalism (SPFLJ) the following year. Like the STE Program, a specialized exam is needed before entering the new program.

In school year 2025-2026, the Senior High School program was reformed for the first time through the Strengthened Senior High School Program. Strands (i.e. STEM, HUMSS, ABM) were removed across 800 schools, including PNHS-Main for grade 11 students. In lieu of the strand system, two main tracks: Academic and Technical Professional (TechPro) are offered, with 17 different pathways (groups of subjects that a student may choose), and these pathways are categorized as Pure Academic, Pure TechPro, or Academic With Doorway (a hybrid of the two aforementioned systems). Aside from that, the new Senior High School program eased the academic workload of students by reducing the number of core subjects but increasing the number of electives, allowing students to explore different subjects. Grade 12 students during that school year are unaffected by the curricular reforms.

As part of the division-wide reshuffling of school principals across Parañaque, Lumaban stepped down from his position as school principal, to be succeeded by Eduardo M. Taguiam.

== Campuses ==
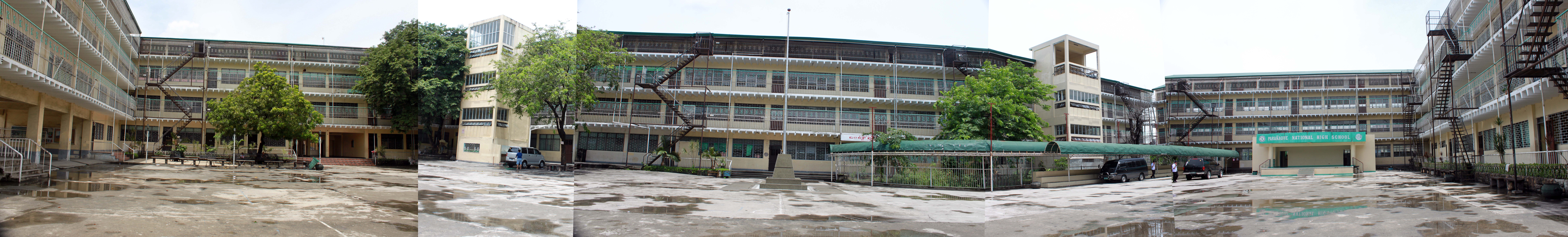
Photostitched Panorama of the Quadrangle of the Main Campus (June 2013). Building A West Building is in the center of the panorama.

=== Current Campuses ===
Parañaque National High School has a main campus located at Barangay San Dionisio, Parañaque and currently has three annexes. The annexes are not totally independent from the main campus and an officer-in-charge assumes the role of school head in an annex. The officers-in-charge of the annexes used to be chosen by the principal of the main campus. These annexes are:

- Parañaque National High School- Baclaran, established 1991.
- Parañaque National High School- San Isidro, established 2019.

=== Former Campuses ===
The school also had former annexes that had become independent by virtue of republic acts, city ordinances, and regional orders. These schools now act independently from the main campus and have a separate administration from the campus. These schools are:

- Baclaran National High School (formerly Baclaran High School-PNHS Annex), established 2002, became independent in 2009 by virtue of Parañaque City Ordinance no. 09–14, s. 2009.
- Doctor Arcadio Santos National High School (formerly San Martin De Porres High School-PMHS Annex), established 1993, became independent in 2000 by virtue of RA no. 8844.
- Don Bosco High School Parañaque (formerly Parañaque National High School-Don Bosco Extension), established 2013, became independent in 2017 by virtue of RA no. 10978.
- Don Galo National High School (Parañaque National High School- Don Galo Annex), established 1999, became independent in 2015 by virtue of RA no. 10837.
- La Huerta National High School (formerly Parañaque National High School-La Huerta Annex), established 1989, became independent in 2016 by virtue of RA no. 10778.
- Marcelo Green National High School (formerly Parañaque National High School- Marcelo Green Annex), established 2015, became independent in 2022 by virtue of RA no 11710.
- Parañaque Science High School, established 1990, was authorized to operate in 1994 by virtue of Parañaque City Ordinance no. 94–31, s. 1994 and became independent in January 2009.
- San Antonio National High School (formerly San Antonio High School-PNHS Annex), established 2015, became independent in 2017 by virtue of RA no. 10988.
- Sto. Niño National High School (formerly Parañaque National High School-Sto. Niño Annex), established 2012, became independent in 2016 by virtue of RA no. 10852.
- Tambo National High School (formerly Parañaque National High School-Tambo Annex), established 2007, became independent in 2018 by virtue of RA no. 11093.

Parañaque Science High School is sometimes not considered as a former annex of the school. Sto. Niño Senior High School is also not considered as a former annex even though its initial location was within the school grounds as it was established as a separate institution from the start.

== Buildings ==
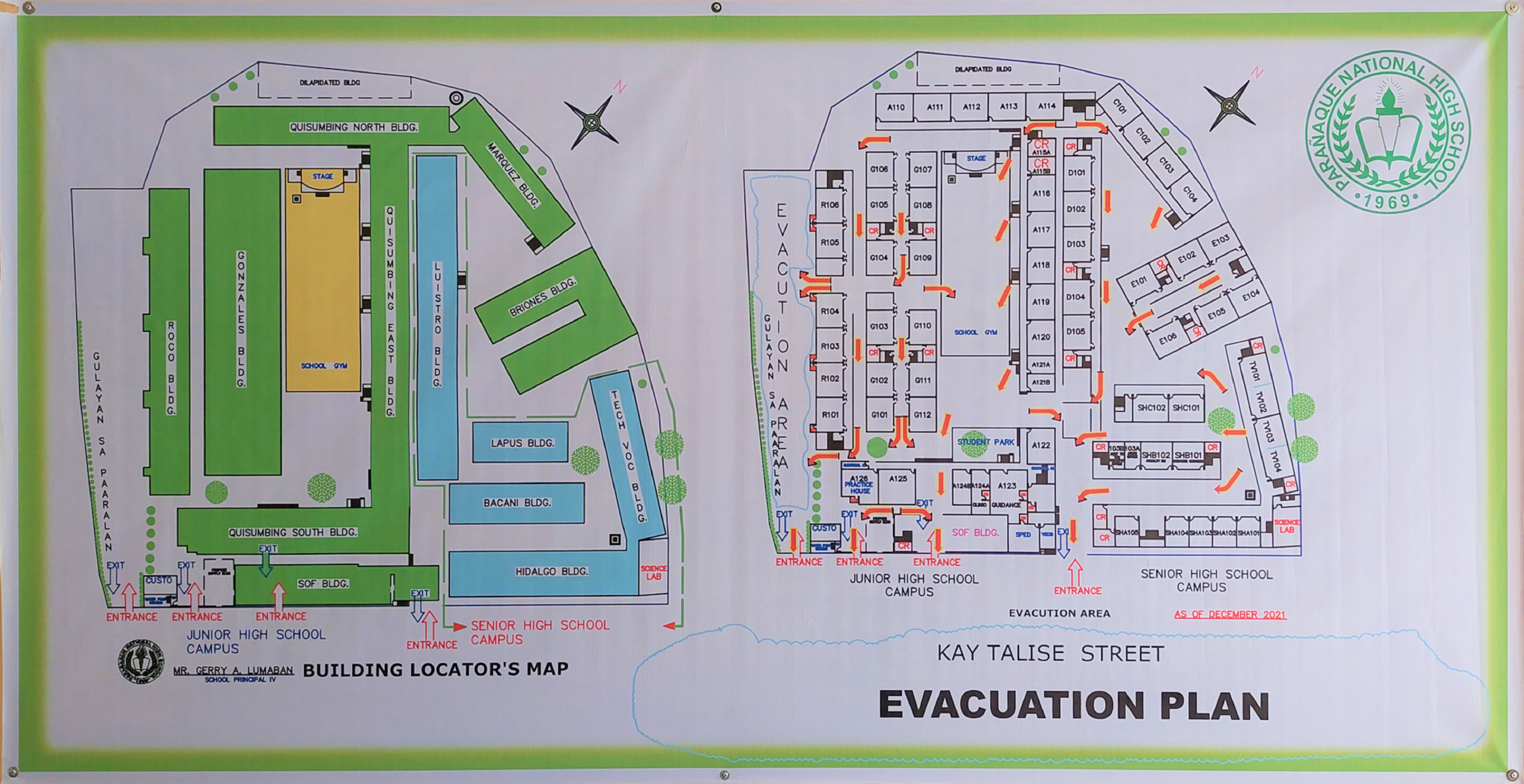
PNHS-Main floor map

Parañaque National High School-Main is situated in an approximately 12,500 m^{2} (135,000 sq ft) lot at Kay Talise Street and Dr. A. Santos Avenue, San Dionisio, Parañaque. Because of the relatively large student population while having a relatively small space, overcrowding can become an issue especially during class arrivals and dismissals. The school hosts multiple buildings catering to both junior high school and senior high school students. These buildings vary in age and function, with the oldest building built during the early 1970s and the newest building built during the early 2020s. An interesting thing to note is that many of the school buildings are named after the former and current secretaries of the Department of Education and many of the school buildings are either three-story or four-story buildings.

The school can be divided into two main areas or campuses: one handling the junior high school students and the other for the senior high school students. The names in parentheses are the older or alternative names of the buildings.

=== Junior high school buildings ===
Junior High School Buildings

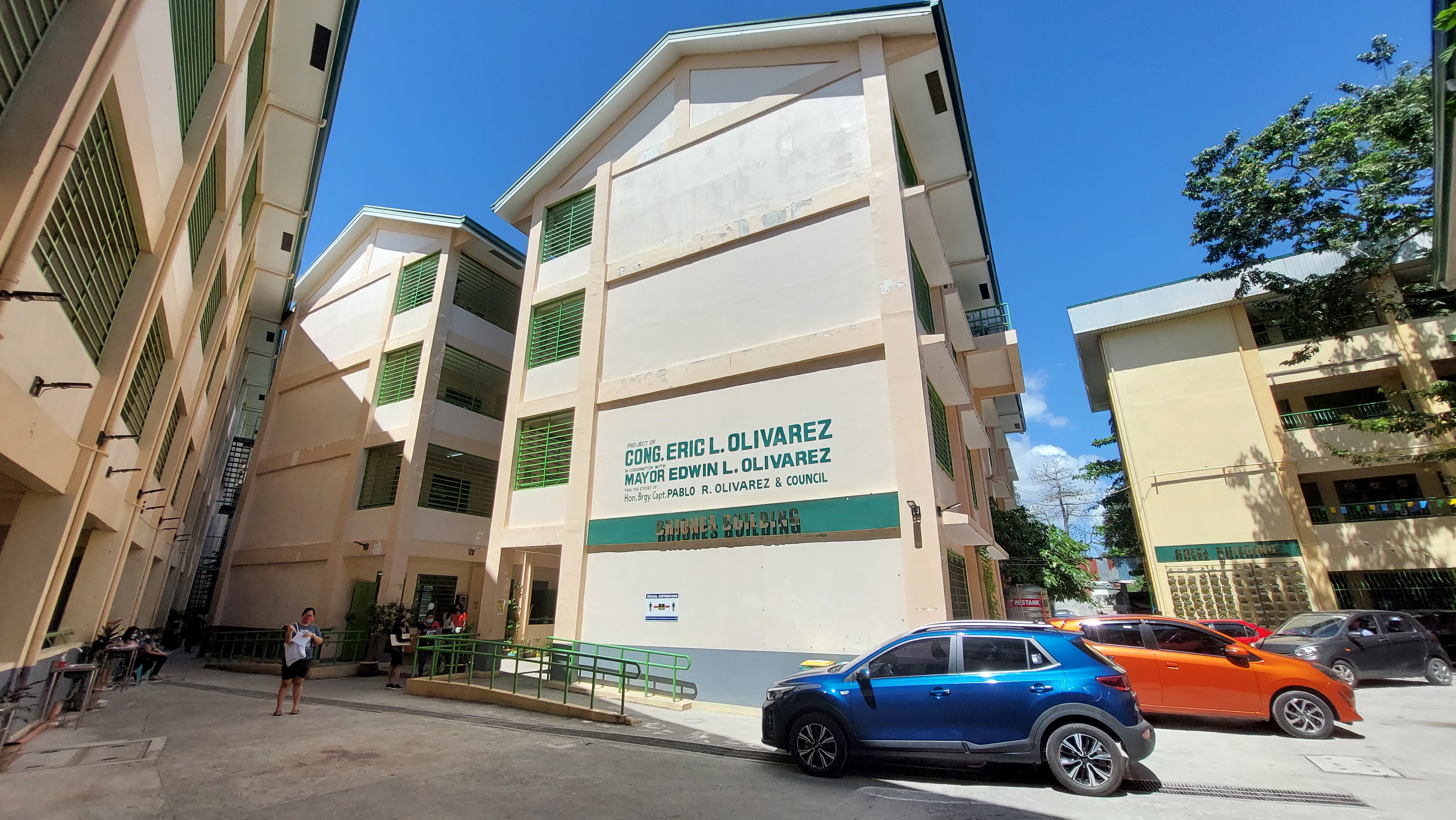
Briones Building

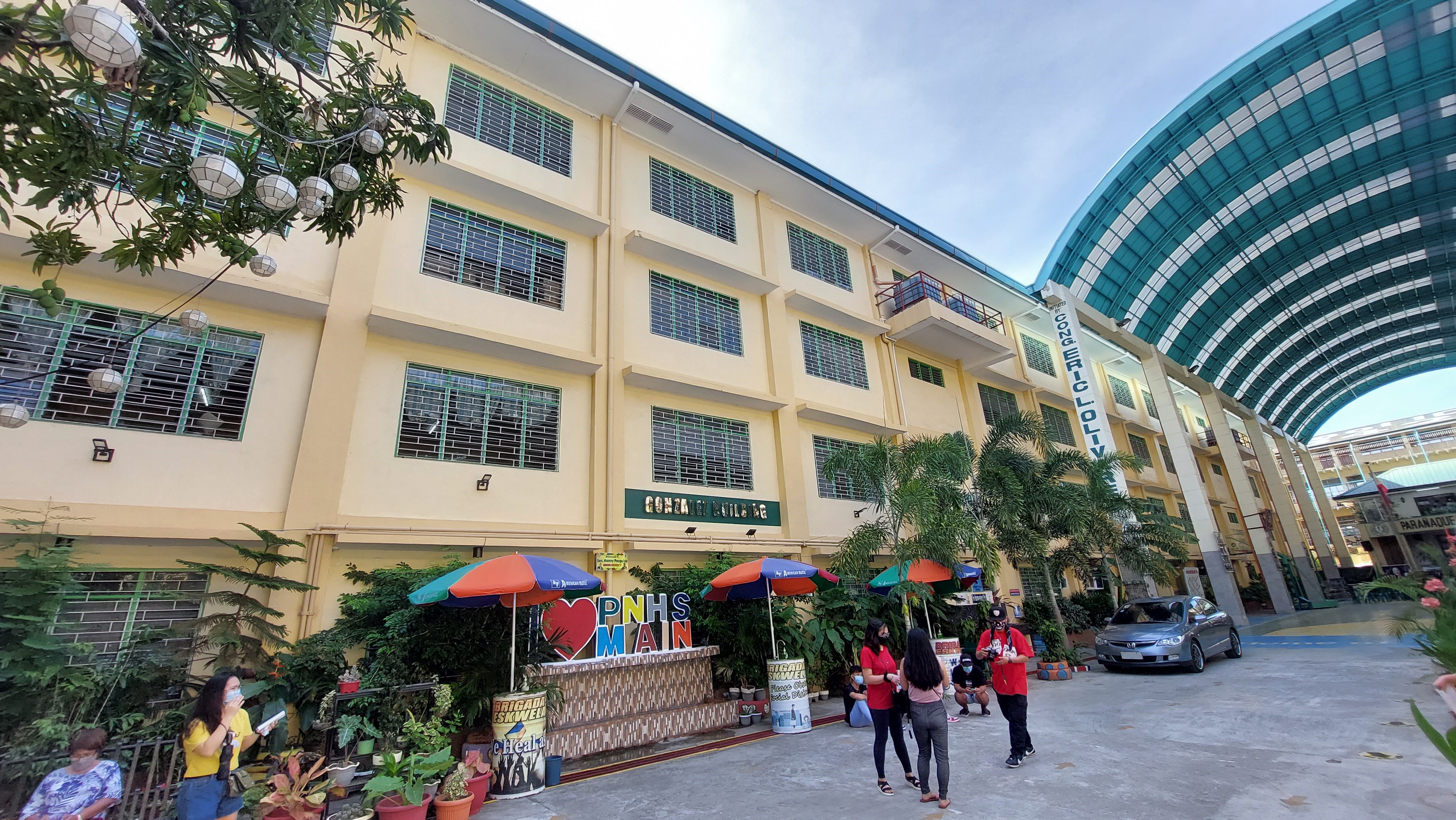
Gonzales Building

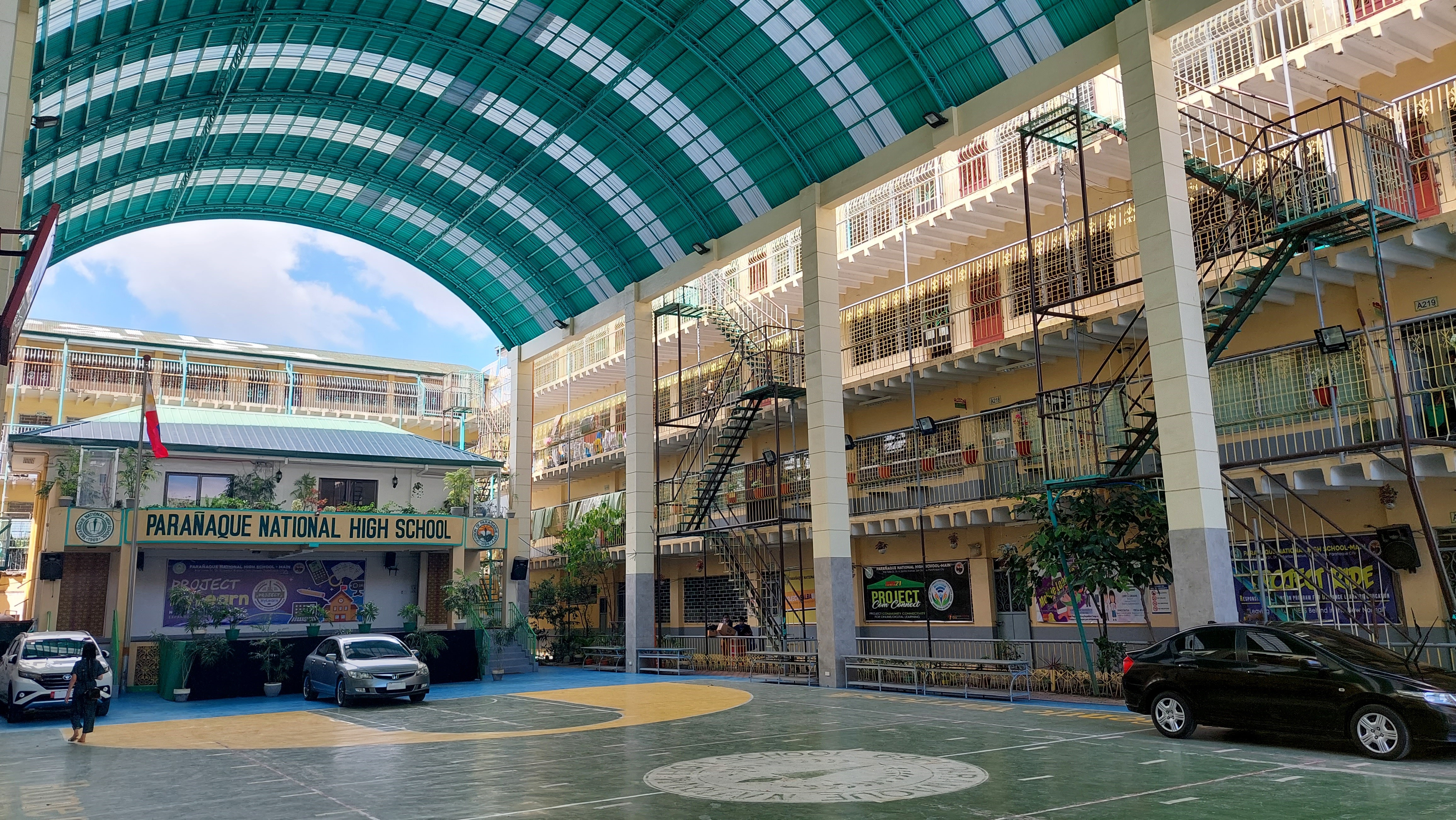
Quisumbing Buildings

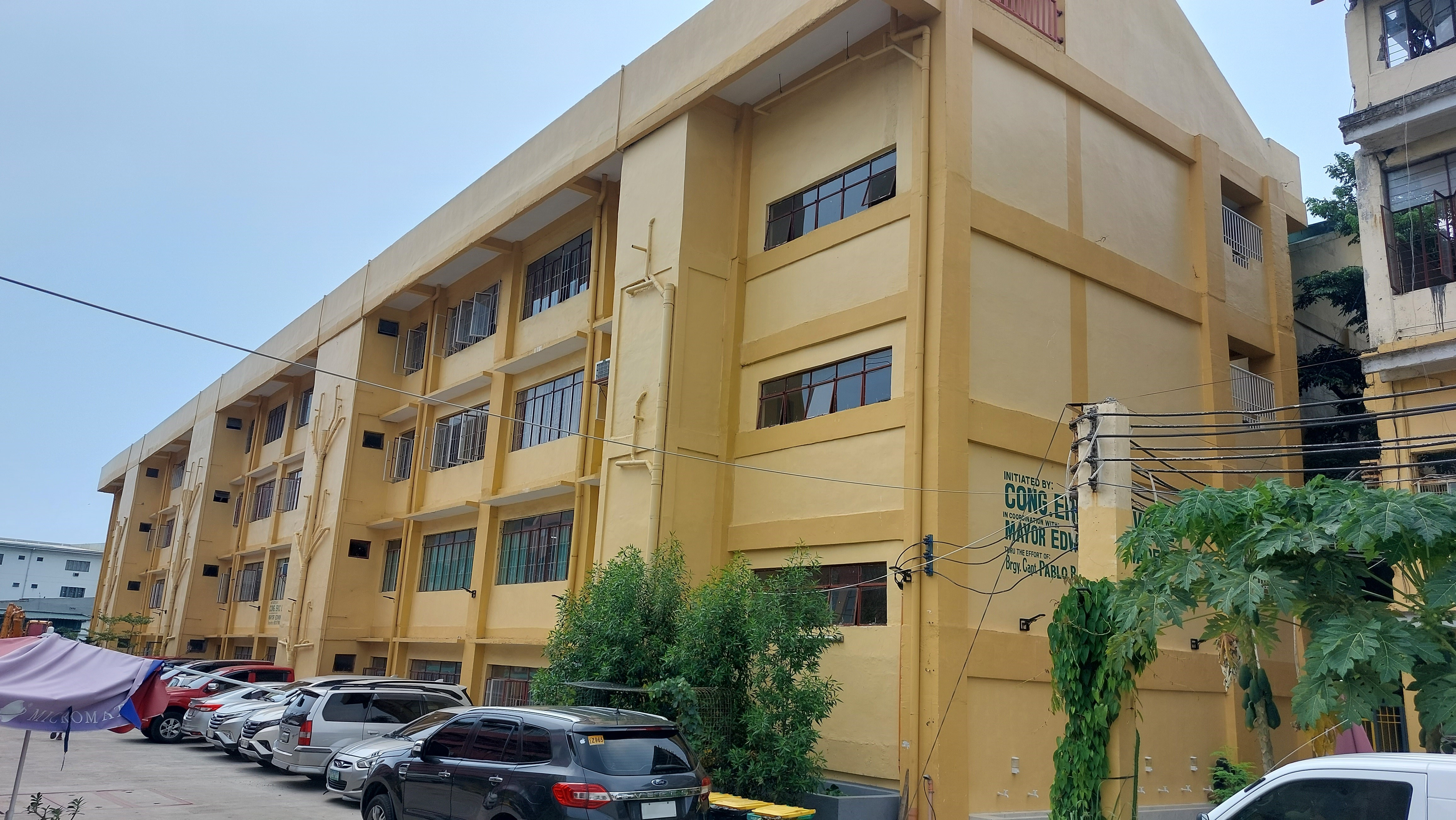
Roco Building

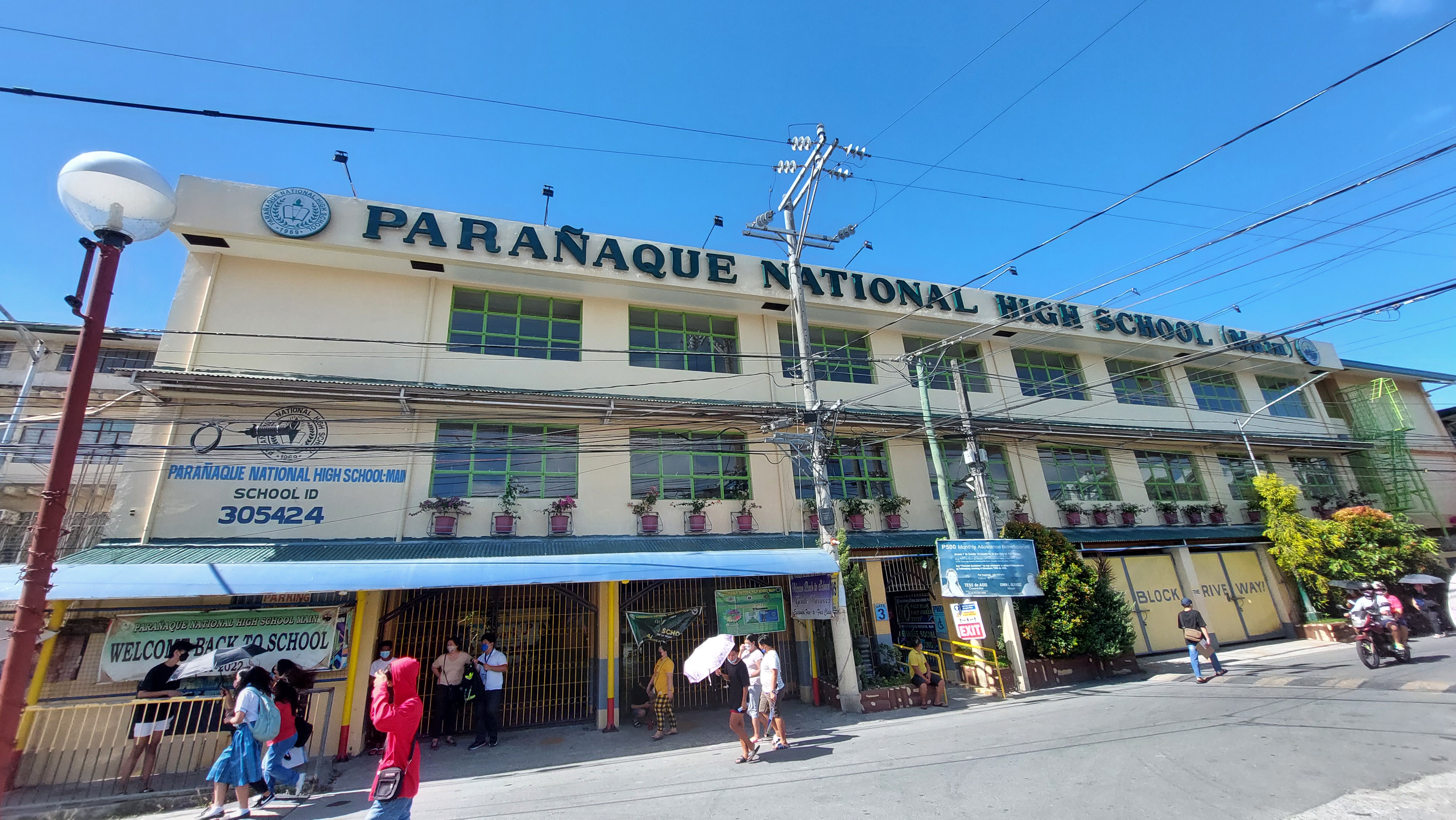
SOF Building

The junior high school buildings are located in the western and northern parts of the school. These buildings collectively accommodate the Junior High School Programs, the Special Education Program (SPED), and the Special Program in the Arts (SPA).

- Briones Building, a four-story building hosting classrooms for junior high school students. It stands on a former gymnasium.
- Gonzales Building, a four-story building hosting classrooms for junior high school students. This is the largest individual building in terms of floor area.
- Quisumbing Buildings (Building A), three four-story buildings consisting of three buildings: Quisumbing North Building, Quisumbing East Building, and Quisumbing South Building. These buildings, alongside the Gonzales Building, surround the school quadrangle. These buildings collectively host canteens, school offices, and classrooms. The buildings not only cater to regular students but also students from the Special Education Program (SPED), and the Special Program in the Arts (SPA). The Quisumbing South Building is the oldest building in the school, completed in 1973. Quisumbing North Building is now demolished to make way for the new building.
- Roco Building, a four-story building hosting a science laboratory and classrooms for junior high school students. This is the newest building of the school.
- SOF Building (Building B/ STE Building), a three-story building and the current façade of the school. This building initially catered to the students of the School of the Future Program but now serves the students of the Science, Technology, and Engineering (STE) Program.

=== Senior high school buildings ===
Senior High School Buildings

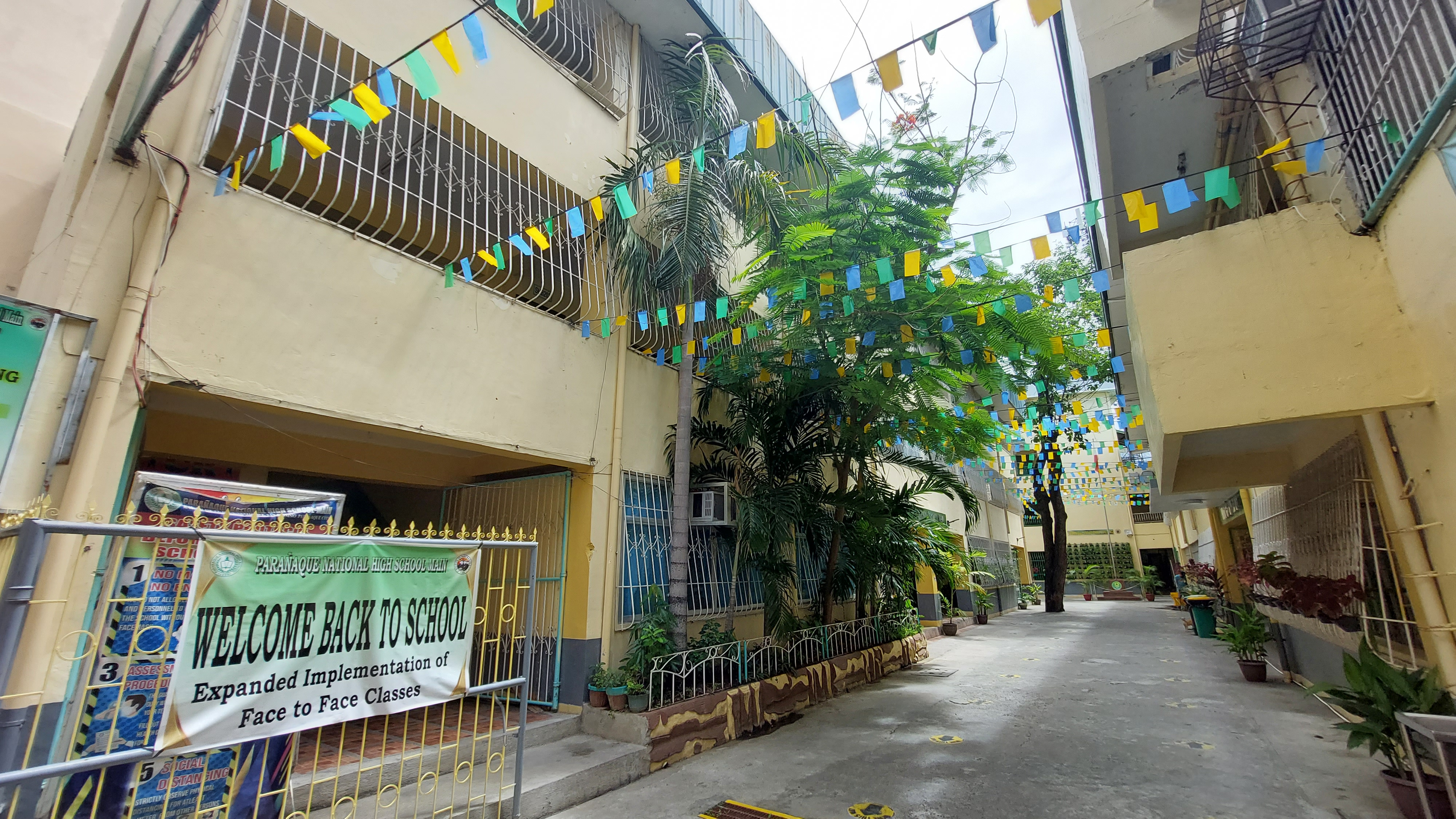
Bacani Building

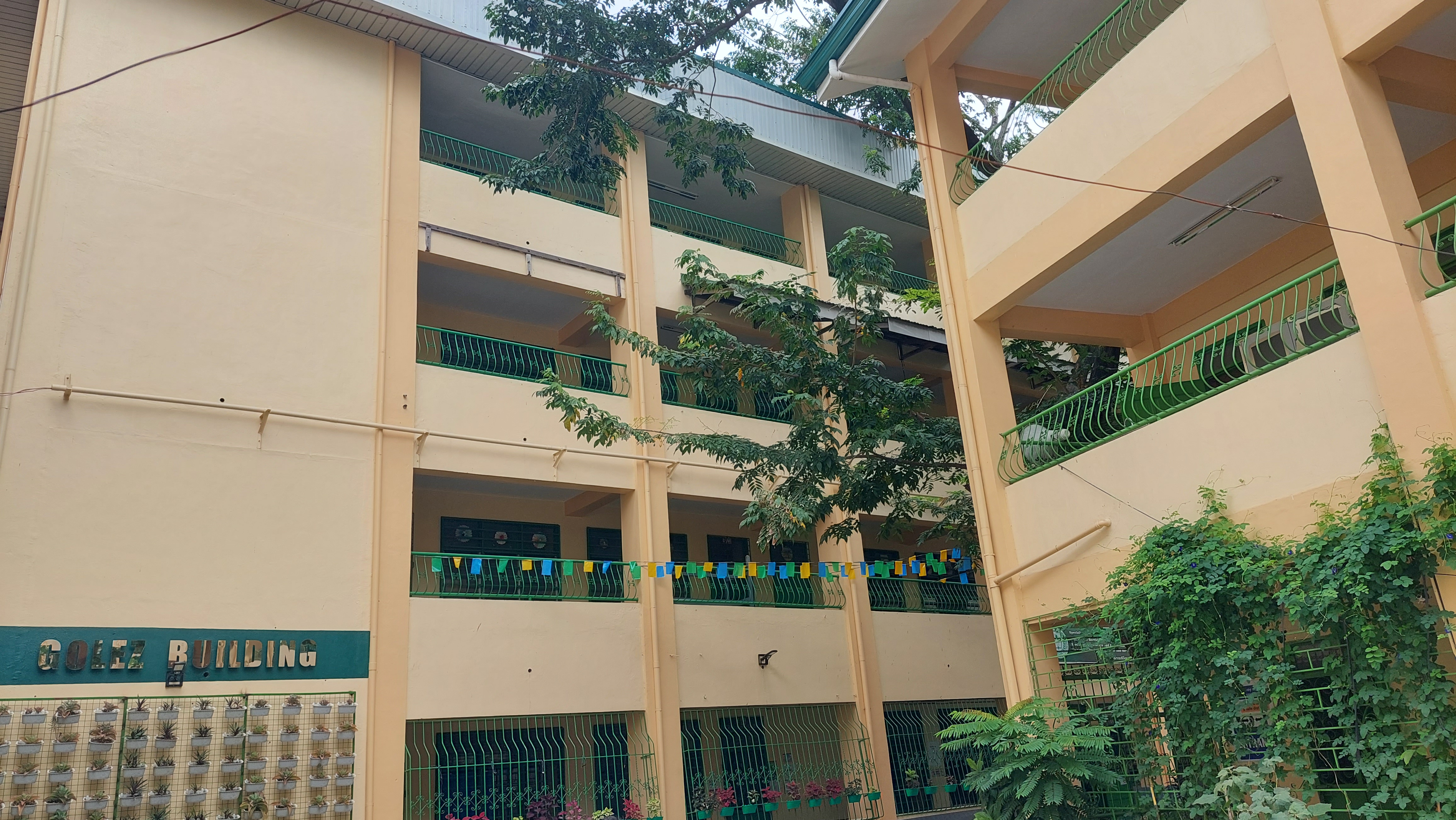
Golez Building

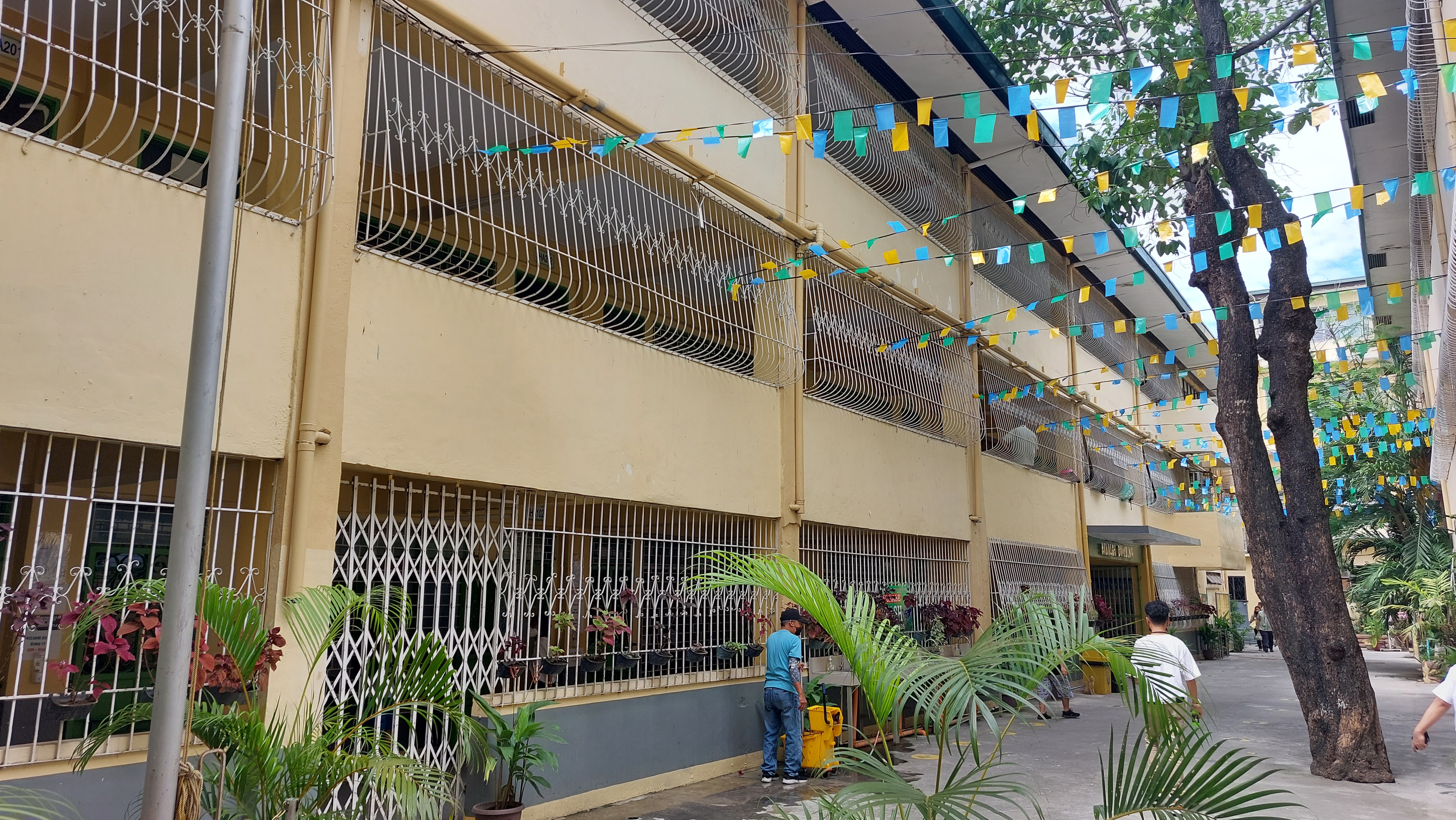
Hidalgo Building

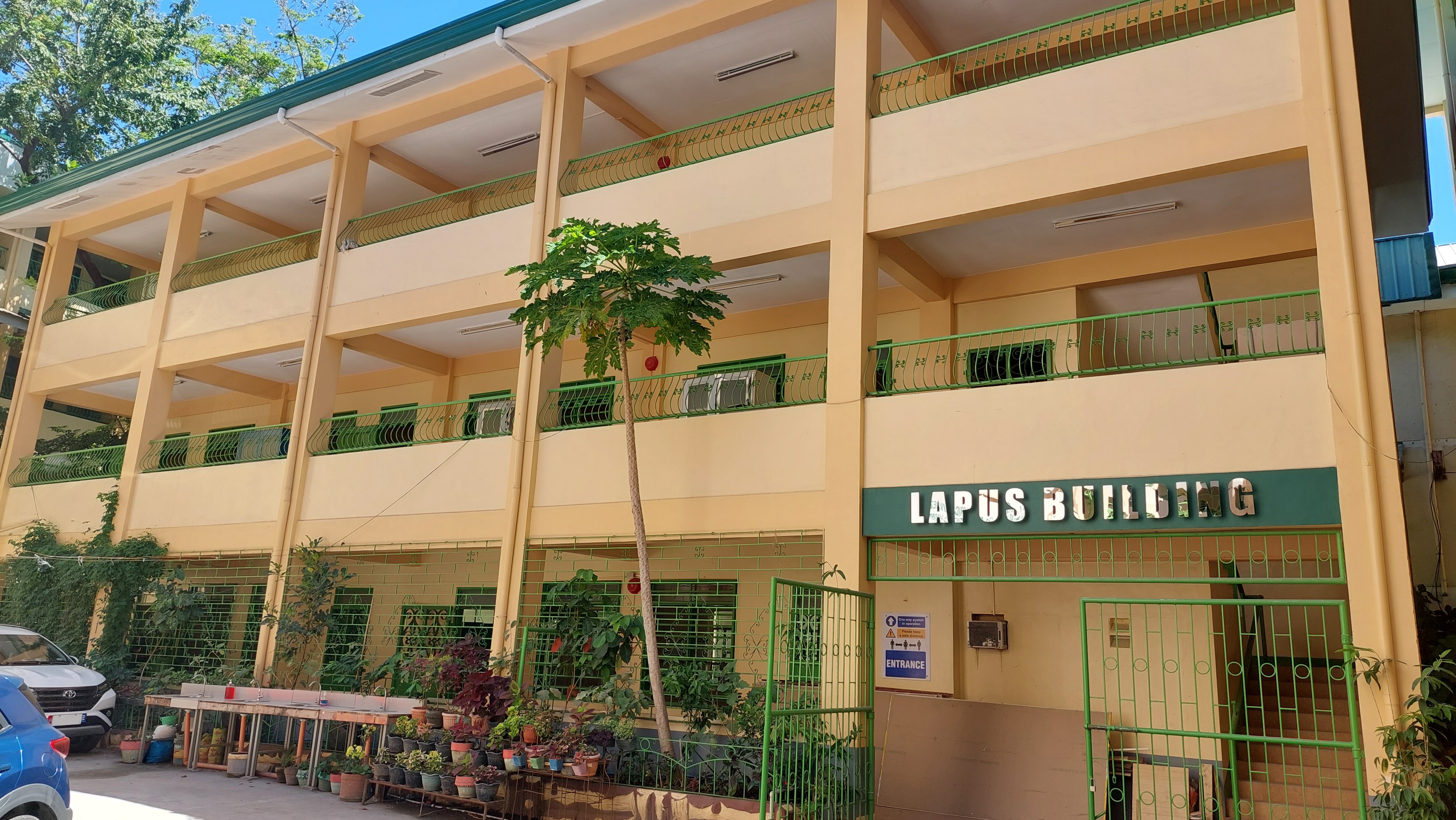
Lapus Building

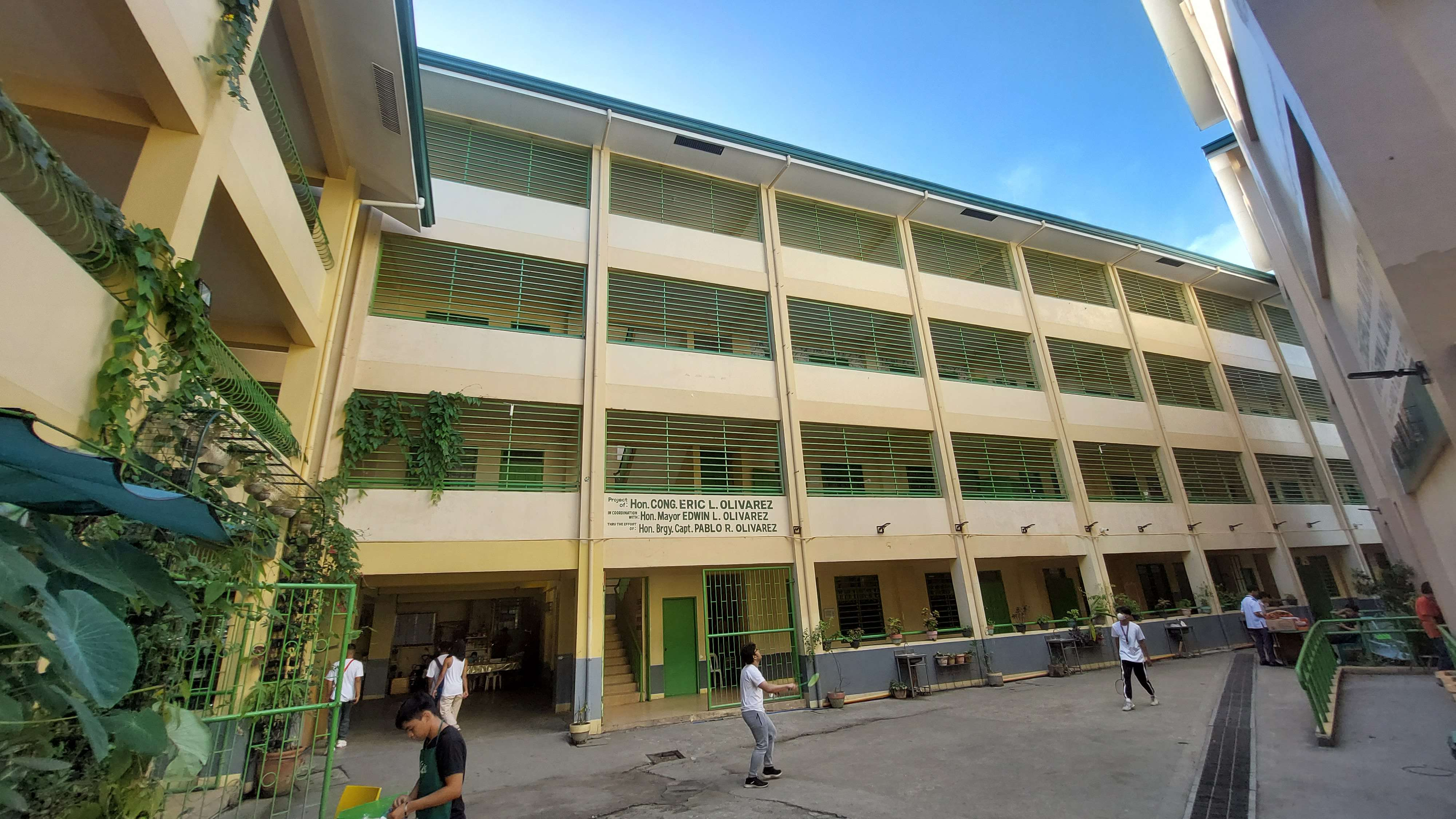
Luistro Building

The senior high school buildings are located in the eastern and southern parts of the school. These buildings collectively accommodate the Senior High School Program as well as the Alternative Learning System (ALS) and Open High School Program (OHSP).

- Bacani Building (Building D/ DOST Building), a three-story building hosting the offices for the senior high school program and classrooms for senior high school students. This served as the former building of the STE Program before its transfer to the SOF Building.
- Golez Building (Building E/ Tech-Voc Building), a four-story building hosting rooms used by the students of the Technical-Vocational Livelihood track of the senior high school program.
- Hidalgo Building (Building G/ Parsci Building), a three-story building hosting classrooms for the senior high school students of the Academic Track. This served as the former building of Parañaque Science High School before its transfer at Sto. Niño.
- Lapus Building (Building F), a three-story building hosting classrooms for senior high school students. This building also hosts a canteen.
- Luistro Building, a four-story building hosting classrooms for senior high school students. This building also caters to the Open High School Program (OHSP) and Alternative Learning System (ALS).

=== Former buildings ===
Former Buildings

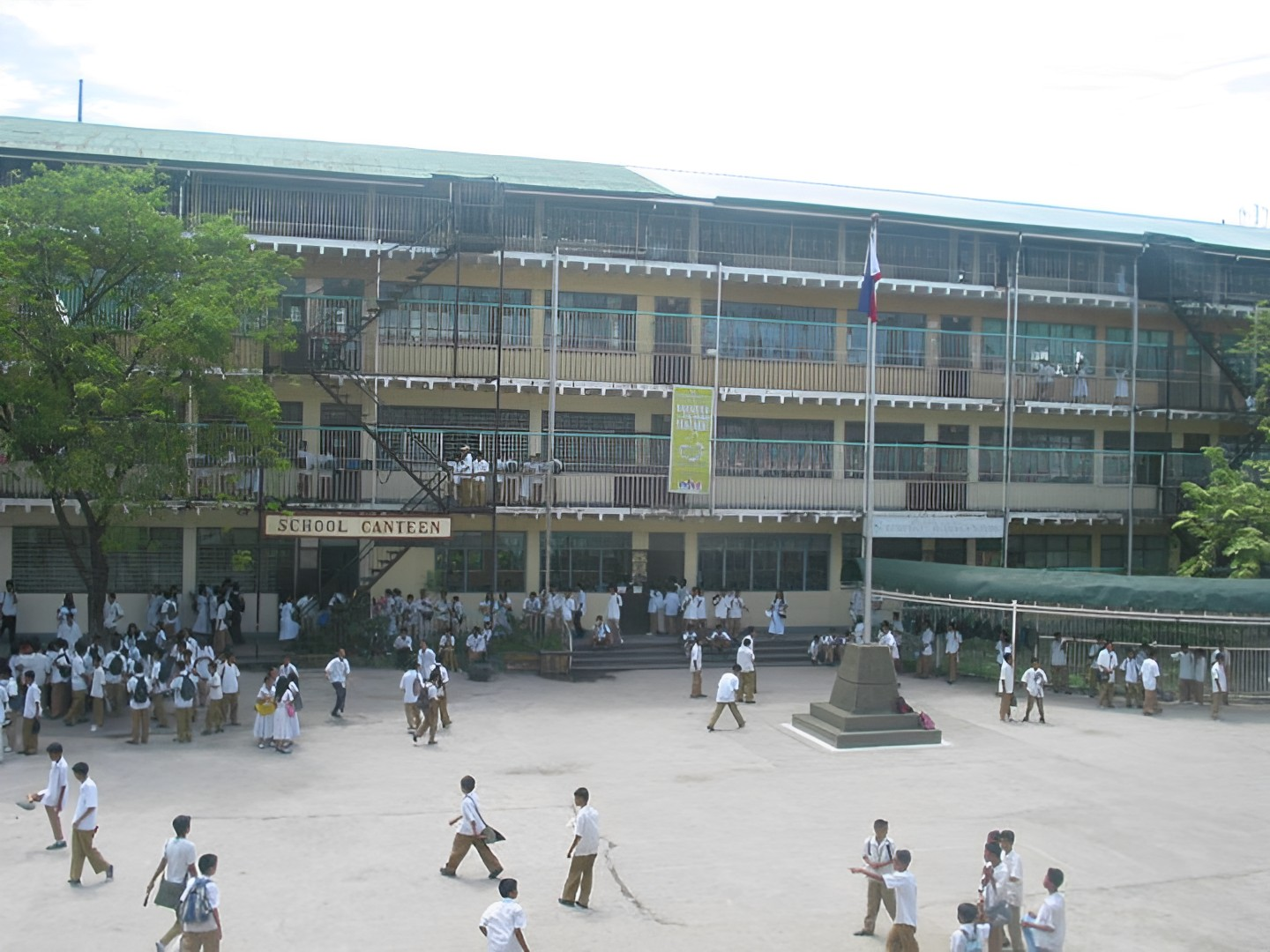
Building A West Building

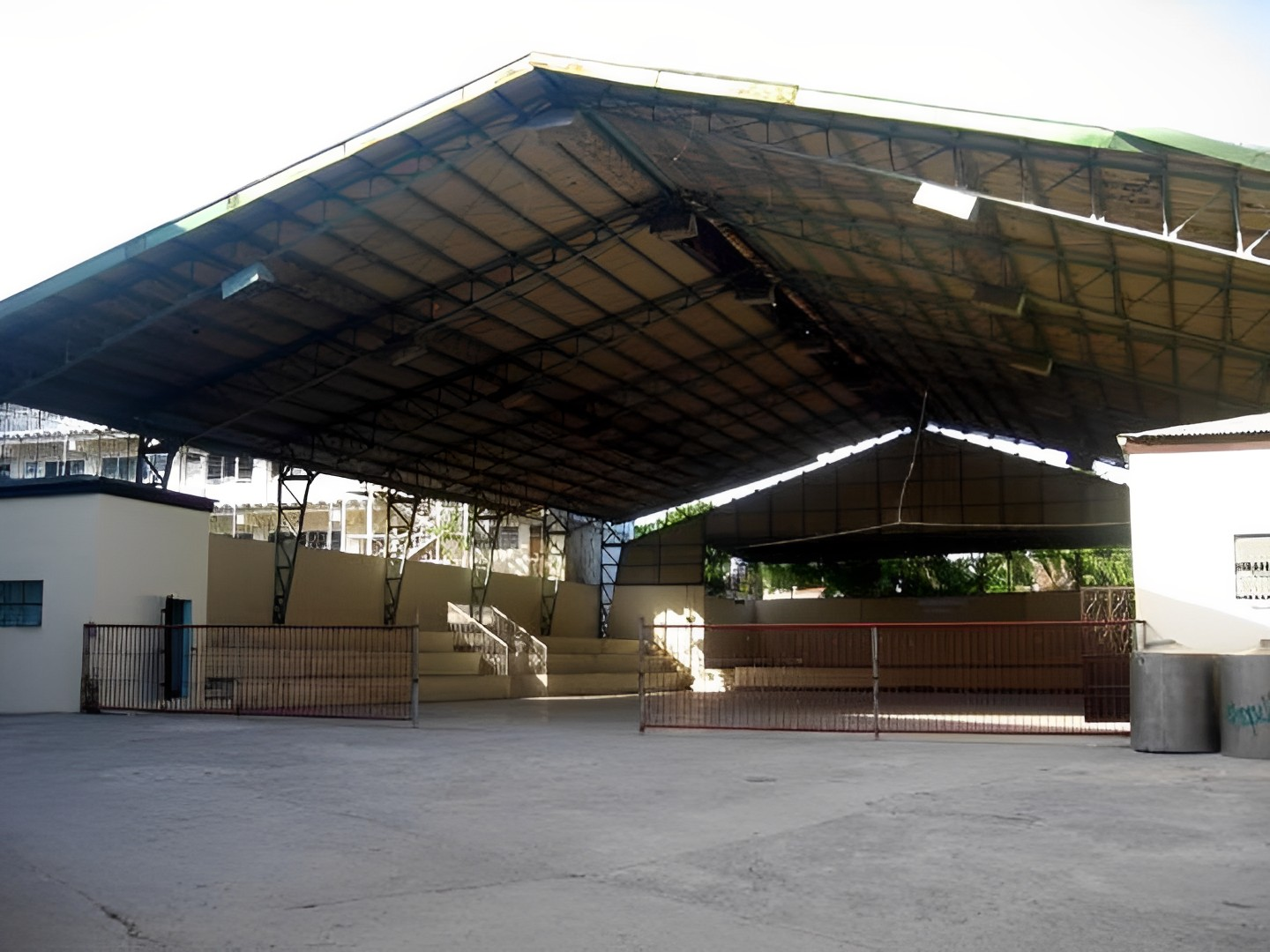
School Gymnasium

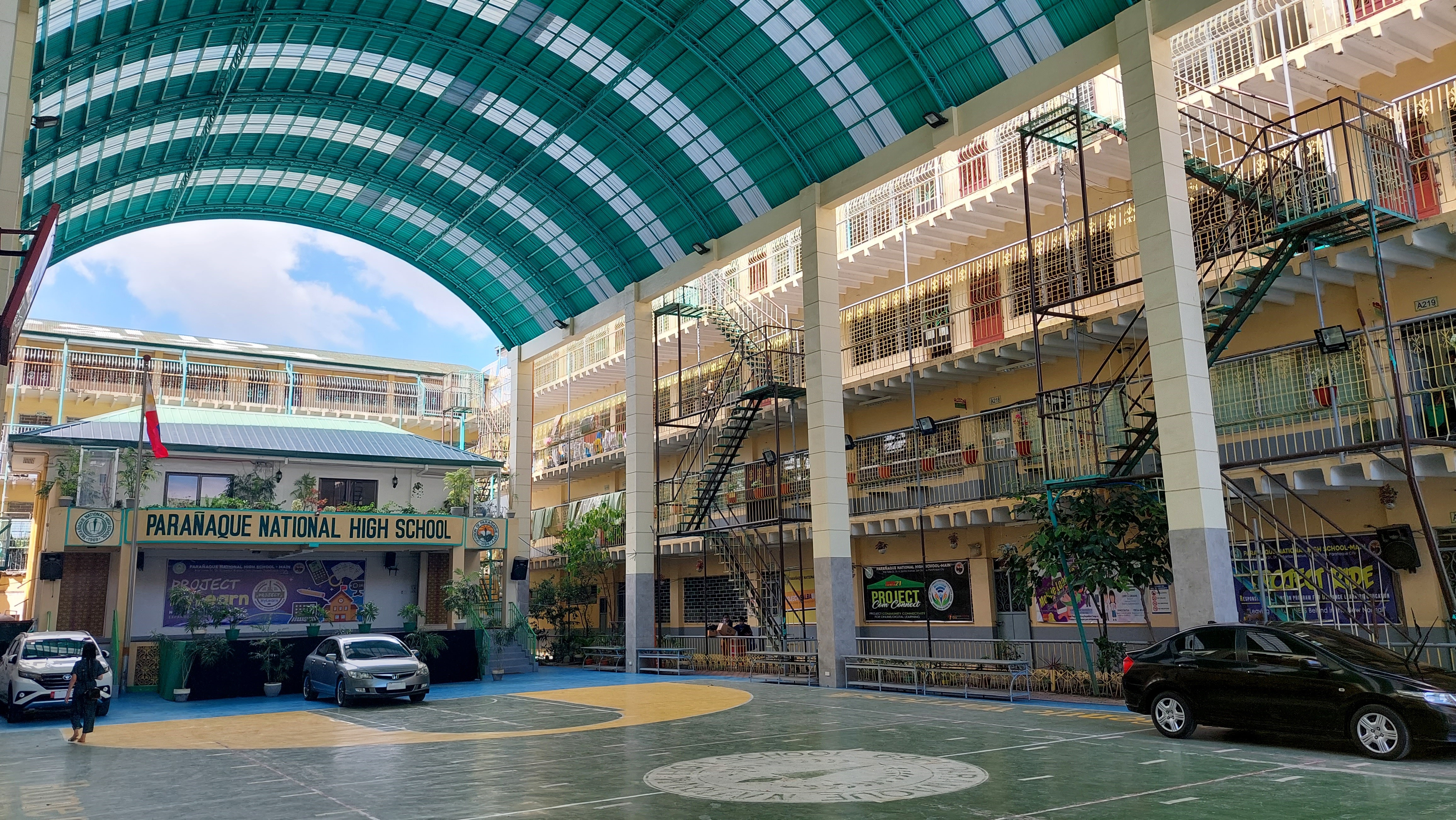
Quisumbing North Building

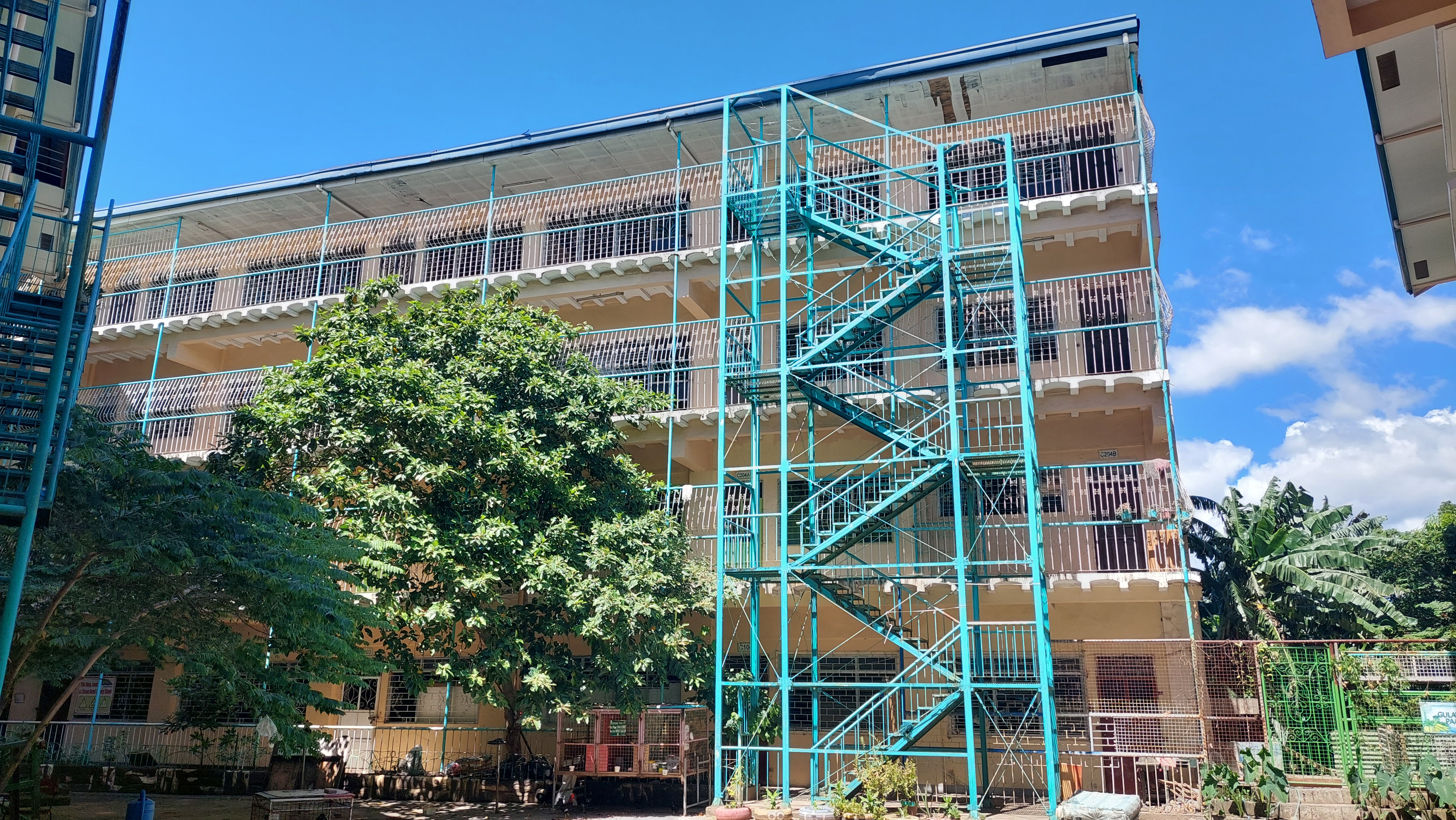
Marquez Building

These buildings used to exist in the school but were demolished for various reasons, such as structural integrity or expansion of school capacity.

- Building A West Building, a four-story building that hosted classrooms, laboratories, faculty rooms, and a canteen. The building is notable for having two rectangular towers that enclose staircases. It was one of the oldest buildings in the school. It was demolished in 2018 to make way for the Gonzales Building and Roco Building.
- School Gymnasium, a roofed structure that had a stage, bleachers, and a mixed basketball and volleyball court. It was demolished in 2017 to make way for the Briones building.
- Quisumbing North Building, a four-story building that hosted classrooms. It was demolished in 2025 to make way for a 10-story building.
- Marquez Building (Building C), a four-story building that used to host classrooms for junior high school students and had specialized rooms for the Technical Livelihood Education subject at the first floor. The building was demolished in 2025 to make way for the new building.

== School Programs ==
Because of the options that the school provides, such as having both academic and technical-vocational tracks, the school is technically considered a comprehensive national high school. Listed below are the programs that the school provides for both the junior and senior high school programs.

=== Junior High School Programs ===
The junior high school program is roughly equivalent to the middle school program in other countries. This grade level spans from grades 7 to 10. This program was reformed after the change in curriculum implemented by the Department of Education, changing the system of secondary education by adding more years to the high school program and splitting it into two separate programs.

- Science, Technology, and Engineering Program (STE), this program provides skills necessary in the field of science and technology for junior high school students in preparation of undertaking more advanced science subjects in higher grade levels. The program was formerly known by many names: Science, Technology, Engineering, and Mathematics Program (STEM), Department of Science and Technology (DOST) program, and Engineering and Science Education Program (ESEP).
- Regular Program, this is considered as the default and oldest program of the school. Elementary graduates from any DepEd accredited/recognized institution study core subjects.
- Special Program in the Arts (SPA), this program offers a comprehensive arts-based education to students with an inclination to the arts. The programs are listed below.
  - Dance (folk dance, contemporary, hip hop)
  - Visual Arts
  - Music (choir, voice, rondalla, drum & lyre)
  - Creative writing
  - Theater Arts
- Special Program for Foreign Language and Journalism (SPFLJ), this program offers journalism and foreign language classes to students with an inclination in writing.
- Open High School Program (OHSP), this program serves also as an alternative mode of formal secondary education by providing distance learning to elementary school graduates, high school drop-outs and successful examinees of the Philippine Education Placement Test (PEPT).
- Special Education Program (SPED)/ Inclusive Education, this program serves to help students with disabilities by doing a more inclusive approach to education.
- Alternative Learning System (ALS), this program serves as an alternative mode of formal secondary education by providing education to those adults and out-of-school youths.

=== Senior High School Programs ===
The senior high school program is a program that spans from grades 11 to 12. The program was made as part of the K-12 program of the Department of Education. Students of the program are required to take core subjects which are universally taken regardless of strand; applied subjects, which are similar to core subjects but differ in instruction and workload based on the strand chosen; and specialized subjects, which are unique to a particular strand and cannot be taken by other strands. This program was introduced by the school during SY 2016-2017 and initially offered two tracks and nine strands, with three strands at the academic track and six at the technical-vocational livelihood track. This makes the school one of the earliest high schools in the city to implement the senior high school program. Two more strands, one for the academic track and the other for the technical-vocational track, were introduced the following year. One strand from the academic track was removed in SY 2020–2021 in order to increase the number of students in other strands. In SY 2025-2026, as part of the Strengthened Senior High School Program, the strand system implemented since SY 2016-2017 are phased out for the pathway system.

==== Academic track ====
This track focuses more on providing specialized academic subjects for students that may pursue higher education i.e., universities and polytechnics. This can range from the fields of business, humanities, or the sciences. Initially, the school only offered the ABM, GAS, and STEM strands as part of the academic track of the senior high school program during SY 2016–2017. The HUMSS strand was introduced a year later. Starting SY 2020–2021, the GA strand was no longer offered by the school in order to accommodate the other strands in increasing student numbers. Listed below are the strands that the school offers. In 2025, as part of the Strengthened Senior High School Program, the strands under the academic track will no longer be offered to incoming students as the pathways will be implemented in lieu of the strands.

===== Strands of the Academic Track =====
- Accountancy, Business and Management (ABM)
- Humanities and Social Sciences (HUMSS)
- General Academic Strand (GAS)- this strand is no longer offered by the school after SY 2019-2020
- Science, Technology, Engineering and Mathematics (STEM)

==== Technical-Professional track (TechPro) ====
This track focuses more on providing technical and vocational skills and education to students who wish to gain employment after graduating from senior high school. Students who graduate from this track will be given Certificates of Competency (COC) and Level 2 National Certificates (NC II). The school initially offered six strands as part of the technical-vocational livelihood track during SY 2016–2017. The ICT strand was introduced a year later as part of expansion of the Senior High School system. Like the academic track, strands in the Technical-vocational Livelihood track are dissolved as pathways will replace the strands. As part of the curricular reforms, the Technical-vocational Livelihood track is renamed as the Technical-Professional track.

- Automotive Servicing
- Beauty Care
- Bread and Pastry Production
- Cookery
- Dressmaking
- Electrical Installation and Maintenance
- Electronics Products Assembly and Servicing
- Food and Beverage Services
- Hairdressing - unavailable
- Information and Communications Technology (ICT)
- Motorcycle and Small Engine Repair - unavailable
- Tailoring - unavailable
- Wellness Massage - unavailable

== Organization ==
=== Principals ===
Like all schools here in the Philippines, Parañaque National High School-Main is headed by a principal. The principal is a person responsible for the administrative and instructional supervision of a school or a school cluster. Below is a table showing the principals of the school. From August 2001 until January 2002, Estrella C. Aseron headed as officer-in-charge before becoming principal of the school.

No.	Picture	Principal	Term of Office
1		Angelita R. Samson	1969 – June 6, 1985
2		Rosario M. Soriano	June 7, 1985 – October 9, 1986
3		Rosa V. Sioson	October 10, 1986 – August 30, 2001
4		Estrella C. Aseron	January 7, 2002 – August 2006
5		Urbano E. Agustin	August 2006 – October 24, 2014
6		Rosendo C. Abulog	October 28, 2014 – July 6, 2018
7		Gerry A. Lumaban	July 9, 2018 – September 6, 2026
8		Eduardo M. Taguiam	September 14, 2026 – present

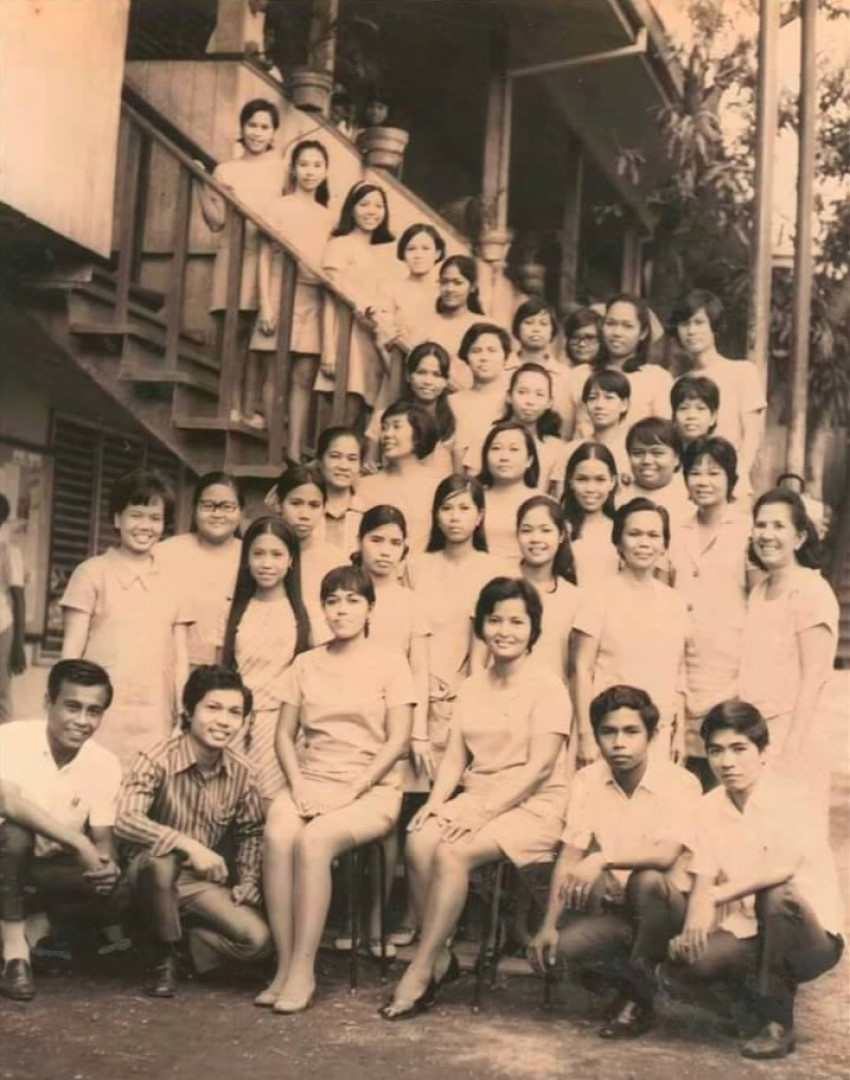
The teaching staff during the early years of the school. Nery Building can be seen in the background.

=== Teaching staff ===
The teaching staff of the school is divided based on the school subject of instruction, and a group of teachers teaching the same subject are grouped into a school department or faculty. Both junior and senior high school teachers are grouped into a school department and the school department is led and managed by a department head. There are a total of eight departments in the school; that is, if the senior high school department is not separated. The faculty rooms of the different school departments can be located at different parts of the school, with eight faculty rooms for the junior high teachers and only one faculty for the senior high school teachers. During the school's first year of operation, the school only had 19 teachers. The expansion of the school increased the number of teachers working at the school. As of 2022, more than 500 teachers are teaching of the main campus itself, some of the faculty members being former students of the school itself.

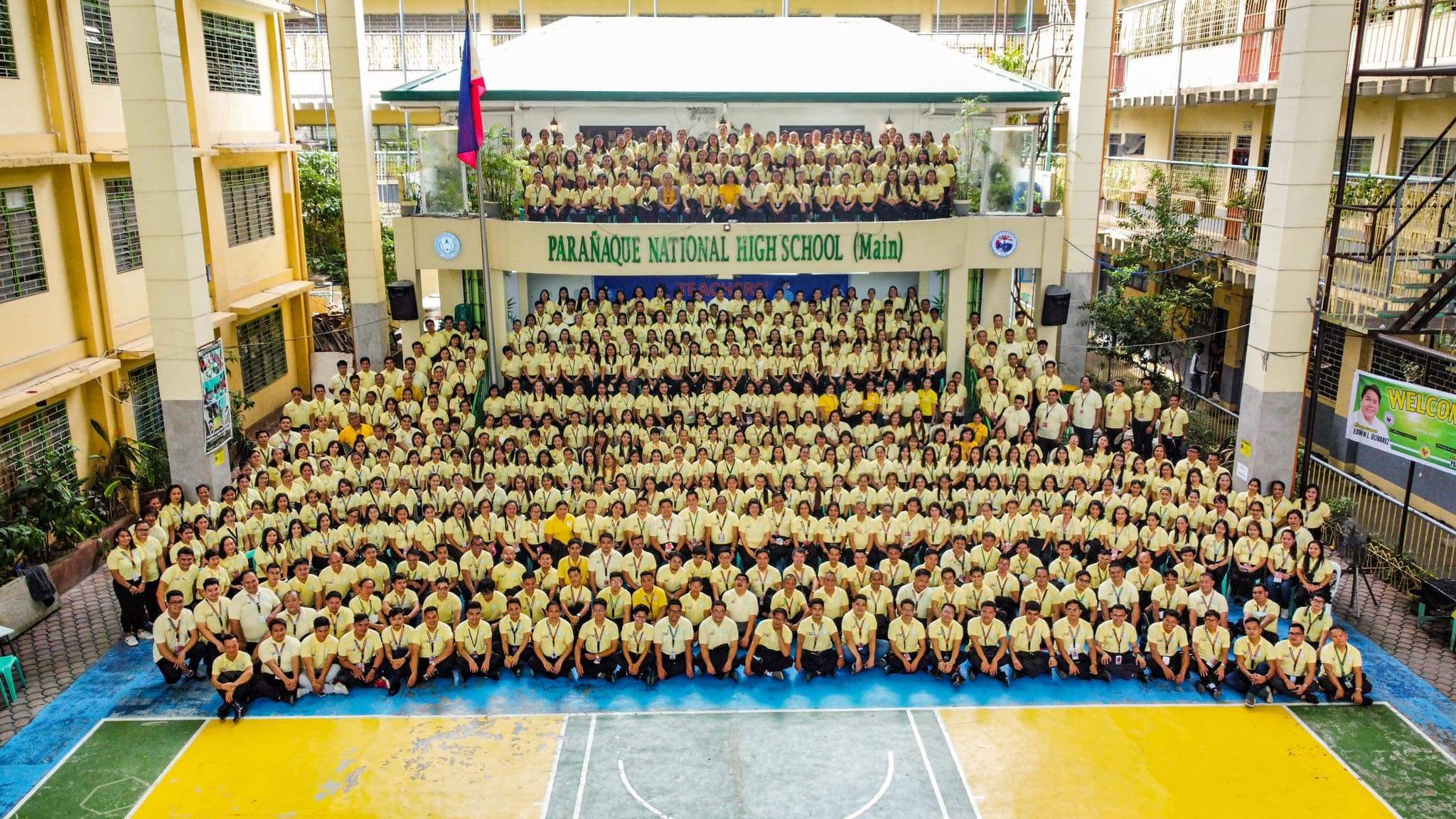
Teaching staff posing for a picture

=== Non-teaching personnel ===
The non-teaching personnel, although not having any teaching or instructional roles, are responsible for the upkeep and maintenance of the school grounds. They are also responsible for the sustenance of the school constituents. These personnel come from the departments of accounting, clinic, guidance, HR/administrative, and security. The offices of the non-teaching personnel can be located at different parts of the school.

== Student life ==
=== Demographics and Student profile ===
Initially, when the school was created in 1969; it only had a number of 512 students. Expansion of the school grounds and the urbanization of Metro Manila helped swell the numbers up to approximately 10,000 by the mid-1980s. Since then, the number of students studying in the school is slowly rising at a steady rate. When the school first implemented the senior high school program during school year 2016-2017, it had a population of 10,638 students.

The population of the school is at an increasing rate and is unlikely to decrease in population. As of the school year 2020–2021, there were 11,479 junior high school students and 4,603 senior high school students. The total number of students as a whole numbered about 16,082; this is the total number of students in the main campus alone. For school year 2022-2023 on the other hand, the school had a total of approximately 17,000 students in both junior and senior high school programs in the main campus alone. During school year 2023-2024, the school population increased yet again to approximately 18,500 students, making the school the largest in the country in terms of school population. Many of these students come from Parañaque; however, there are students that also come from neighboring cities such as Las Piñas, Pasay, and Bacoor.

The school currently handles students from grade 7 to 12. Each grade level is divided into sections, with each grade level only being identified by a name. Currently; grade 7 sections are named after the different personal and social values, grade 8 sections are named after provinces in the Philippines, grade 9 sections are named after trees, grade 10 sections are named after heroes of the Philippines, grade 11 sections are named after Filipinos who contributed to fields relevant to the strand, and grade 12 sections are named after foreigners who contributed to fields relevant to the strand. The STE and SPA program is unique in that it does not follow the naming patterns of the other programs, instead naming the sections after National Scientists and National Artists respectively.

The former system of naming sections is a numerical system in which sections are referred by a number. An even older system of naming sections includes identifying a section by both a name and a number. The OHSP, SPA, and STE program referred to its sections by a letter rather than a number.

=== Uniforms ===
Currently, the ordinary school uniforms use a mostly dark blue-light blue plaid pattern with yellow pivots. The school uniforms were introduced in SY 2016–2017. The male junior high school uniform consists of a white short-sleeved button-up shirt with a blue and green collar band, left chest pocket with school logo; and grey slacks. The female junior high school uniform has a white blouse with a plaid trim, plaid necktie with the school logo, and a plaid skirt. The male senior high school uniform differs from the junior high school uniform by having plaid epaulettes on the button-up shirt. The female senior high school uniform consists of a narrow button-up blouse with plaid short sleeve cuffs, waist pockets, and a logo of the school on the left side of the collar; a light blue bandana tie; and a plaid pencil skirt. The school logo may either be sewn or printed on the uniforms. The Cookery strand has a unique uniform in that a checkered black-and-white chef's uniform is worn by students of the strand. Black shoes are worn for the ordinary school uniforms.

The Physical Education uniform on the other hand is a unisex uniform that consists of a mostly white V-neck shirt with colored sleeves, and mostly black jogging pants with a white stripe on the side seams and school logo on the right side of the pants. The uniforms differ in color based on grade level: green is used for grade 7, gold for grade 8, blue for grade 9, red for grade 10, and grey for senior high school.

The old ordinary school uniforms were used from the earliest days of the school up until SY 2015–2016. For the male uniform, the uniform consists of a plain white button-up shirt with a logo and brown slacks for grades 7-9/ first-third year and black slacks for grade 10/ fourth year. The female uniform consists of a white blouse with the school logo on the left side of the waist, light green and white checkered tie, and a white skirt. The old Physical Education uniforms on the other consist of a cotton shirt with the school logo on the left side and jogging pants with the school logo printed on the left side of the pants that differ in color based on grade level, with the same color scheme with the new uniforms.

=== Hymn ===
The hymn of Parañaque National High School is called "PNHS Alma Mater", formerly called "PMHS Alma Mater". It was written by Mrs. Marina Flores and composed by Mr. Apolonio Dandan, Jr. This is sung after the singing of the national anthem during the flag ceremony. The lyrics used for the school hymn were slightly modified to reflect the school being nationalized.

Lyrics:

I.
O', PNHS Alma Mater
Thou stand majestic in the verdant plains.
With strength and hope,
You make us live;
With braver hearts,
With bigger dreams.

II.
𝄆 You make our lives complete.
You vanish all our fears.
The joys of wisdom,
The laughter of youth,
All these we'll treasure;
All through the years. 𝄇

=== Events ===
The first day of school is considered as one of the most important days of the school year, and during that day a flag ceremony is held to officially start the school year. This usually takes place at June on a Monday. The first day of school is noted to have shortened class hours as well.

Parañaque National High School, like many other public schools here in the Philippines, observes the weekly flag ceremony every Monday of the school year. The flag ceremony is starts a quarter before 6 AM and is usually headed by a department head and after the flag ceremony the school principal makes his announcements at times about important issues or important events that will happen within a school week or school month. At certain occasions students or outsiders may use the opportunity to perform or make announcements in front of the students.

The school departments celebrate a month for a particular subject; such as Nutrition Month in July, Buwan ng Wika (transl. Language Month by the Filipino department) in August, Science Month in September, United Nations Month in October, English Month in November, Edukasyon sa Pagpapakatao (transl. Values Education) Month in December, and Mathematics Month in January. Usually a school mass held at the first Friday of the month at either the school quadrangle or audio-visual room and it is led by the department celebrating that particular month. February is considered as the most special month of the school since it is the month when the school was established and it is also the month of Parañaque Day, a special non-working holiday of the city held every February 13. Foundation week is celebrated at the fourth week of February and Foundation Day is celebrated every February 24.

The school, like all public establishments, observes both working and non working holidays even during the middle of the school year. These holidays that are observed are included but not limited to New Year, Chinese New Year, Day of Valor, Holy Week, Independence Day, All Soul's Day, and Christmas.

The school conducts a quarterly evacuation drill twice during the day: one for the morning batch and the other for the afternoon batch. The school's active response team is responsible in maintaining order in conducting the quarterly evacuation drill pursuant to RA no. 10121.

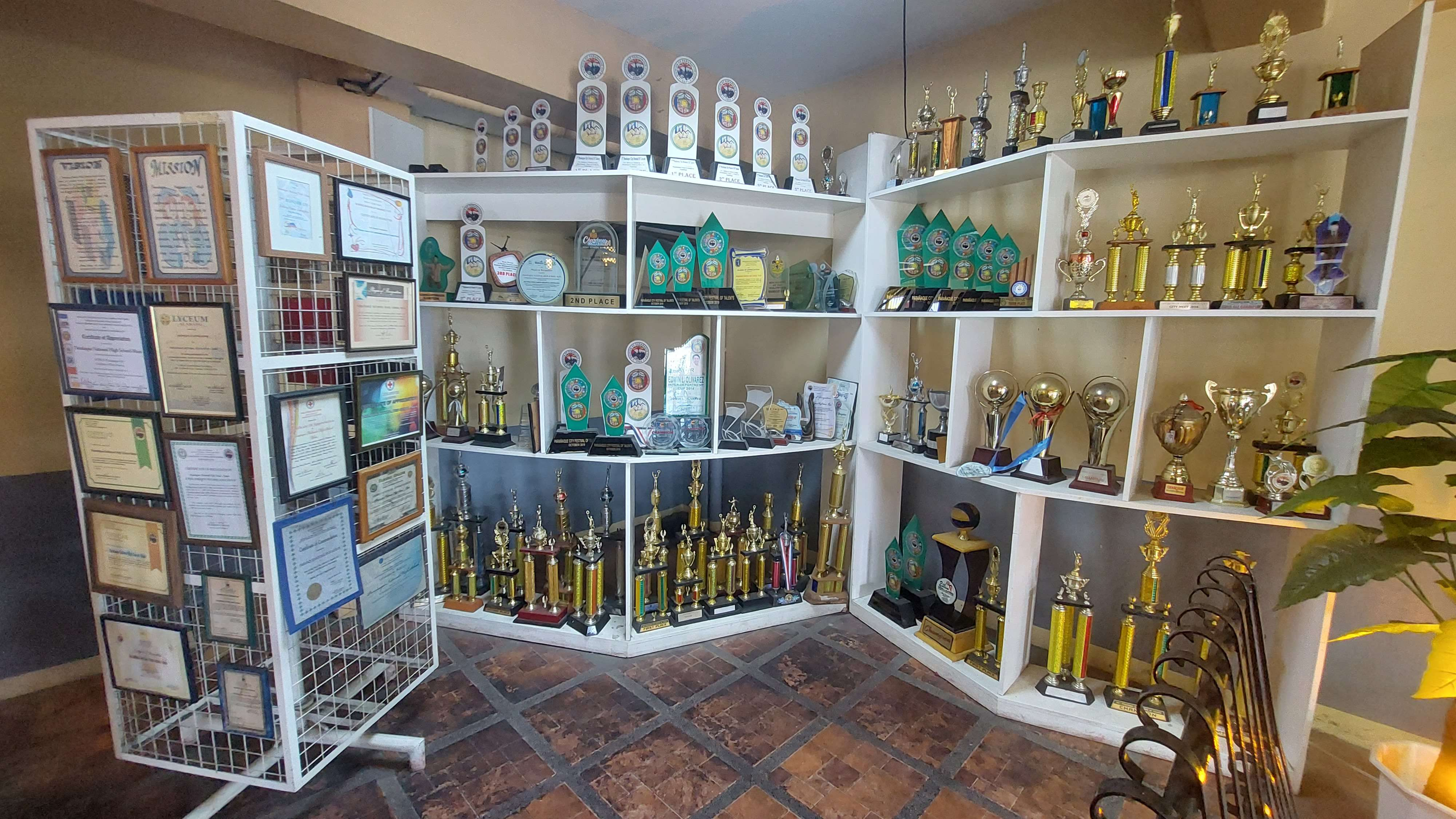
Awards that the school received over the years.

Flooding is a perennial issue that the school faces every school year especially that the school is surrounded by a creek. This usually leads to class suspensions for the school. The bridge was elevated and also a box culvert was installed at different points in time in order to mitigate the effects of flooding in the area.

Before the pandemic, the End of School Year (EOSY) rites such as recognition, moving up, and graduation happen usually between late March or early April. The rites usually happen in the school quadrangle; however, in rare instances, the rites may be held outside such as the case of the first batch of K-12 graduates from the school that held their rites in the nearby New Barangay San Dionisio Sports Complex. During the height of the pandemic; the rites for recognition, moving up, and graduation were done online. Face-to-face EOSY rites only returned in 2022, this time at late June.

The school joined the annual Brigada Eskwela (transl. School Brigade) program every May in anticipation of the next school year. The school is sometimes visited by celebrities. Examples included the Hashtags that performed in June 2016 during a report from Umagang Kay Ganda and Filipino Boy Band SB19 visited the school as part of the Korean Culture Caravan in August 2019. Because of the notably large school population and location within Metro Manila, news programs from different TV networks and radio stations occasionally visit the school to report and feature notable events in the school.

=== School organizations ===
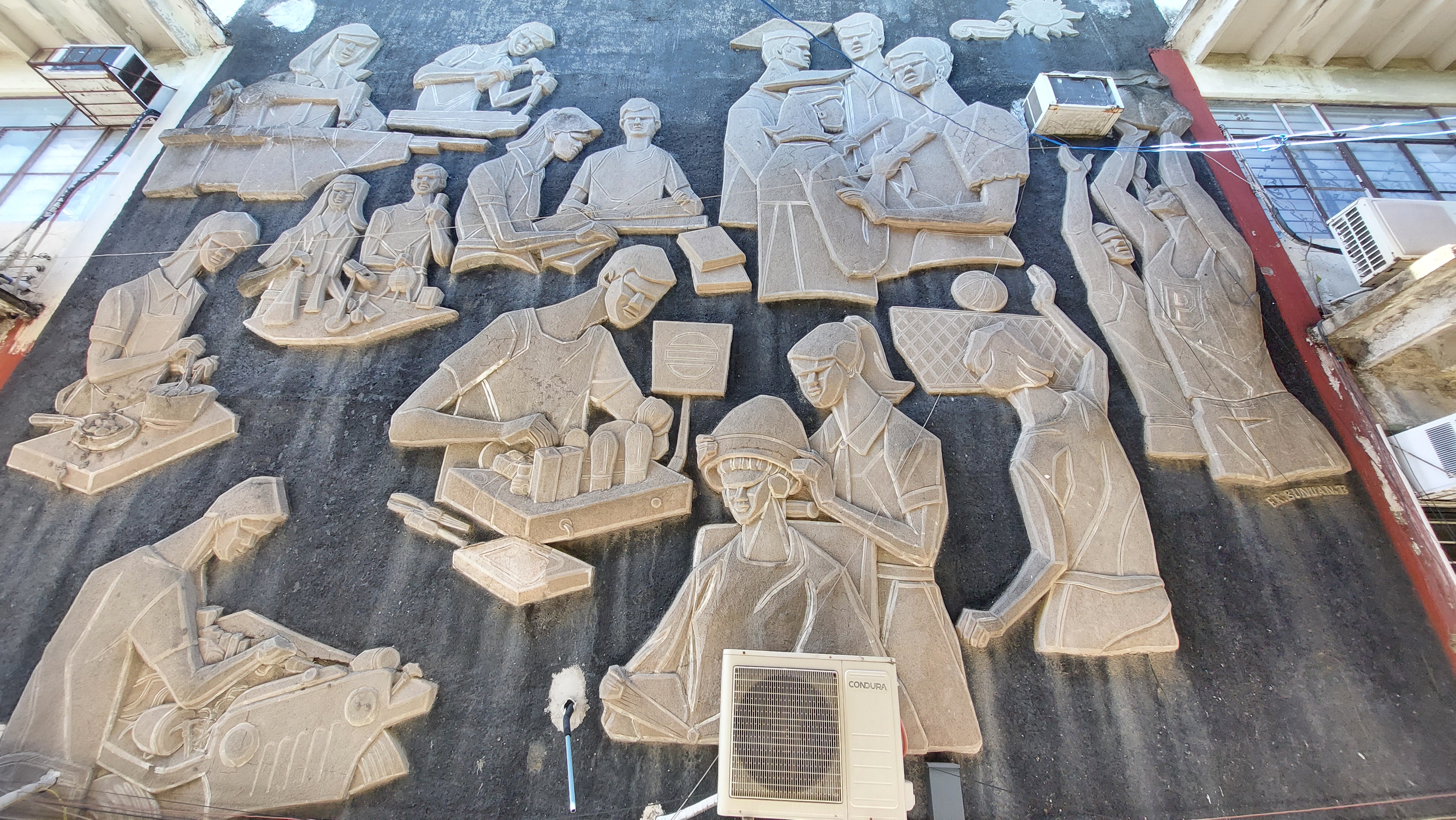
PNHS Bas Relief, representing academia, extracurricular activities, and professions.

The school has multiple school and student organizations dealing with a wide range of disciplines: from both academic and extracurricular activities.

The PNHS-Main Supreme Secondary Learner Government (SSLG) is the highest governing student body of the school. This organization is part of the School-Based Committees. It is led by a president and has other officers such as the vice president, secretary, treasurer, auditor, public information officer, peace officer, and batch representatives that represent every grade level. The Supreme Student Government has an adviser and co-advisers that overseer the duties of the officers. The PNHS-Main Campus Integrity Crusaders (PNHS-Main CIC AKAP) is another governing student body in the school, but it is more focused in combatting corruption within school premises.

Other School-Based Committees include the PNHS-Teachers Association, PMHS/PNHS General Alumni Association, PNHS-Faculty & Employees Multi-Purpose Cooperative (PNHS FEM COOP), and the General Parents-Teachers Association (GPTA).

The school has two school papers, and these papers differ in the language used in writing. The English publication is called The Spark while its Filipino counterpart is called Ang Dagitab, which is a literal translation of the name of the English publication. Both publications release print newspapers annually with the help of student funding although recently online news articles are posted in their respective Facebook pages. The Spark is now under the PNHS-Main Journalism Club. Recently, the school now has a radio broadcasting station that reports in both English and Filipino named GW Radyo-TV ng PNHS-Main (transl. GW Radio-TV of PNHS-Main).

Other school organizations that are accredited by the school are the Glee Club, SHS Art Club, Science Club (divided into the Junior High School and Senior High School Branch), PNHS-Main E-Club (English club for junior and senior high school students), PNHS-Main Deutschklub (German language and culture club), PNHS-Main SIKAP (Samahan ng mga mag-aaral tungo sa Integrasyon ng Kaalaman sa Araling Panlipunan; transl. Association of Students towards the Integration of Knowledge in Social Studies; Social Studies club for junior and senior high school students), Speakers Club, PNHS-Main TED-Ed Club, The PNHS Curtain Rhapsody (a theater club), Math Club and Sinag Sipnayan (transl. Ray of Mathematics; Math club for junior and senior high school students from the STEM Strand respectively), SYBEX Club (an organization for students from the ABM Strand), YES-O (Youth for Environment in Schools' Organization), Boy Scouts, Girl Scouts, Senior Scouts, PNHS-Main Wash In School (PNHS-Main WINS, a sanitation organization), and Active Response Team (Student Paramedic Organization).

Students in the school may also join organizations and movements that are not from the school itself. These organizations may range from a religious to a political nature. One such organization is Elevate, an ecumenical Evangelical Christian organization that is based from CCF. Another such example is the Youth for Mary and Christ (YMC), a Marian Catholic organization.
