= Parañaque Science High School =

Public high school in Parañaque, Philippines

- Mataas na Paaralang Pang-agham ng Parañaque (Filipino)
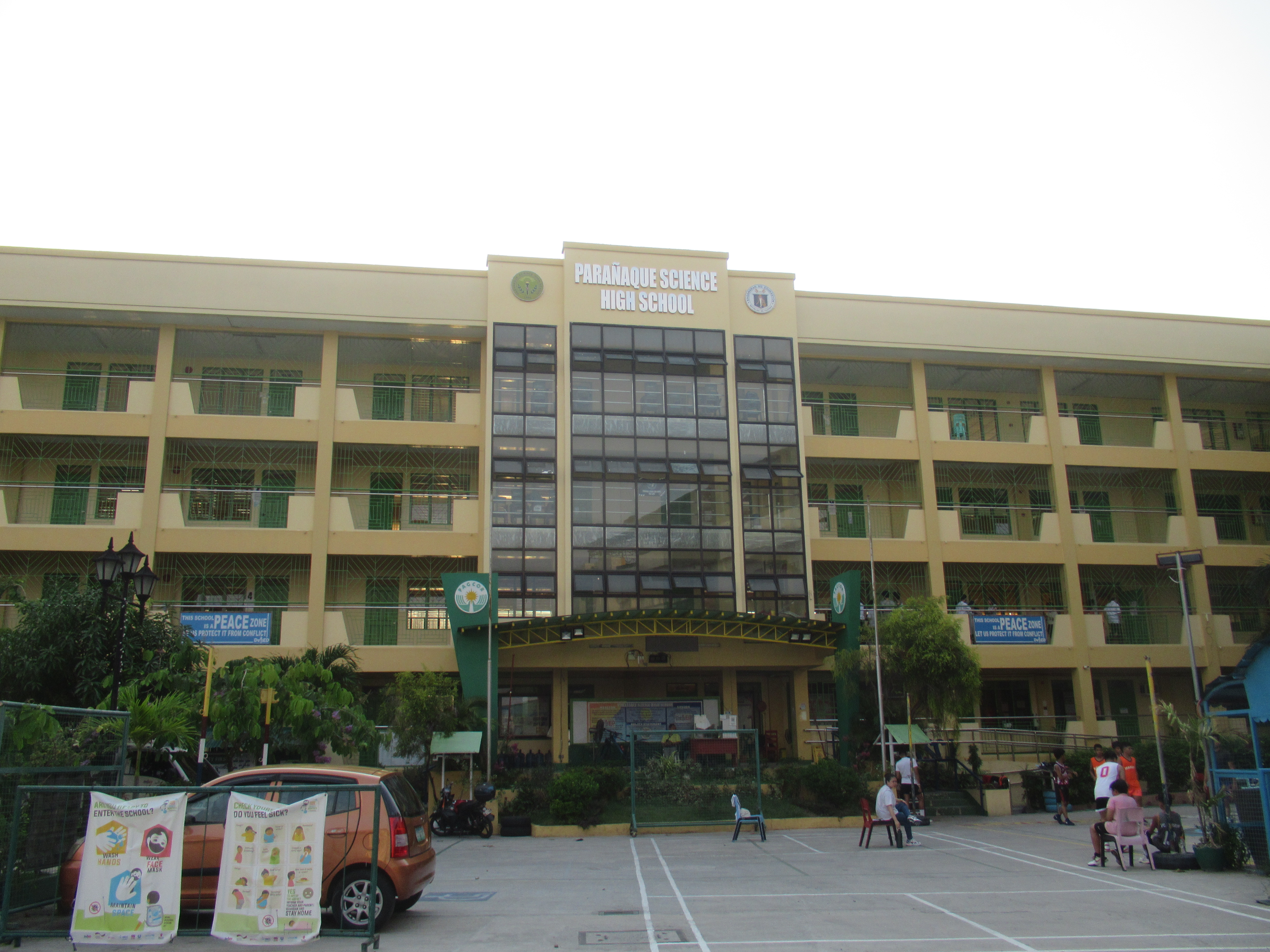
- School Façade in April 2023

Location
- Ninoy Aquino Avenue cor. Dahlia St., Brgy. Sto. Niño, Parañaque; National Capital Region; Parañaque, Metro Manila; Philippines
- Coordinates: 14°30′02″N 120°59′40″E

Information
- Type: Semi-Public
- Motto: Soar High ParSci
- Established: 1990
- Status: Active
- School code: 320201
- Principal: M s. Maria Rhodora P. Espino Ed.D.
- Grades: 7 to 12
- Language: English and Filipino
- Area: 3,500 m^{2} (38,000 sq ft)
- Colors: Blue and Gold
- Nickname: ParSci
- Newspaper: The Momentum
- Affiliations: Division of City Schools - Parañaque
- Website: paranaquesciencehs.depedparanaquecity.com

Parañaque Science High School (Filipino: Mataas na Paaralang Pang-Agham ng Parañaque) (PSHS), colloquially known as ParSci, is a specialized public school in Parañaque, Metro Manila, the Philippines. It is under the administration of the local government of Parañaque and is recognized by the Department of Education. The school offers scholarships to Filipino students who are gifted in the sciences and mathematics. Parañaque Science High School is one of the best public science high school in the NCR (National Capital Region) for providing quality education to high school students.

== History ==
Parañaque Science High School (PSHS) was concerned in 1988 by the late Mayor Walfrido N. Ferrer and his sister Mrs. Flor Cordero. It envisioned to provide free quality secondary education to the exceptionally bright elementary graduates of Parañaque, by having an enriched curriculum in Science, Engineering, Technology and Mathematics. The idea of establishing a science high school was made after the success of Parañaque Municipal High School (PMHS) students in the 1988 Regional Science Fair.

Their vision was referred to the Principal of Parañaque Municipal High School (now Parañaque National High School) Mrs. Rosa V. Sioson, with other school administrator: Miss Narcisa F. Catindig, Assistant Principal and Department Head of Mathematics; Mrs. Teresita Flores, Department Head of English; and Mrs. Elizabeth C. Cabales, Department Head of Science. This was approved by the Division Superintendent, Dr. Ricardo Sibug and the OIC Science Supervisor, Mr. Lino Rom, who signified their support to the notion. Their collaboration marked the birth of PSHS in 1990. With twenty-one (21) students housed in a borrowred classroom of PMHS, and teachers, supervised by the PMHS administrators, PSHS has proven its exceptionality.

Although Parañaque Science was made to bring an enriched curriculum in Science, Engineering, Technology and Mathematics; Parañaque Municipal High School, the host school, created a unique science-based program of its own by establishing the Engineering and Science Education Program (ESEP) in 1993. This made the school one of the first schools in the National Capital Region to establish a dedicated special science program. This program evolved into the Science, Technology, and Engineering program of today.

Under the administration of former Mayor Pablo R. Olivarez, the municipal ordinance 94-31 s.1994, "Authorizing the Creation and Operation of Parañaque Science High School" was signed by the council on February 1, 1994; with city councilors Manuel T. De Guia, Abundio B. Ferrer, Lorna L. Campano, Abe M. King Jr., and Amadeo R. Bobadilla being the proponents of the ordinance. The school was housed in a building adjacent to the main building of PMHS. After a year, the staff of this school attempted to apply for nationalization but this was disapproved due to the policy of "no school within the school".

Former science department heads of Parañaque National High School-Main were assigned to become officers-in-charge of the school, with Mrs. Elizabeth C. Cabales in 2003, Mrs. Alicia De Leon in 2004, Mrs. Leonora J. Nofuente in 2005, Mrs. Zolaida Bonacua in 2006, Mr. Bienvinido Cubebe in January 2007, and Engr. Pablito S. Vibal in August 2007 becoming heads of the school, usually heading the school for a year.

In January 2009, PSHS (PNHS-Annex) has been granted its official seal as an independent school by the Department of Education. This made it a school independent from Parañaque National High School-Main. The first official principal of the school is Sir Vibal. One of the changes that came along with it was the change of the school seal and initially the year of founding in the seal. This led to controversy among students and teachers alike and the founding year of the school is now listed as 1990.

In 2011, former Mayor Florencio M. Bernabe Jr. purchased a property in Barangay Sto. Niño where a two-storey building with twenty-one (21) classrooms was constructed and was officially donated to Parañaque Science High School on April 5. In May 2011, the whole staff of PSHS, headed by the principal Mr. Pablito S. Vibal, occupied this building.

Parañaque Science High School participated in the first-ever "varsity" type robotics competition in the country in the same year.

On August 1, 2013, another academic leader has been installed as the new principal of PSHS - Dr. Concepcion C. Bernaldez. She envisions greater structures that would make PSHS maintain its academic reputation and excellence not only as premier science high school in the city of Parañaque but also in national arena.

An additional school building was constructed in Sto. Niño in anticipation of the K-12 program in 2014.

The school transferred to a 4-storey, 24-classroom building donated by PAGCOR in Dahlia St., Barangay Sto. Niño Parañaque City in March 2016. This building was expanded to include the senior high school building.

== Admission process ==
Every January or February, PSHS accepts applications for the following school year. Foremost among its criteria for selection is being a resident of Parañaque. Other requirements include an average grade of 85% (with no grade lower than 85% in any grading period), belonging to the top 100 qualifiers in the entrance examination, and being able to pass the interview given by the head teachers and the principal of the school.

== Organization ==
=== Officers-in-charge and principals ===
Parañaque Science High School is currently headed by a principal. From 1990 up until 2009 the school was headed by an officer-in-charge rather than a principal. This is because the school is not entirely considered as an independent school.

Name	Picture	Position	Term of Office
Elizabeth C. Cabales		Officer-in-Charge	2003
Alicia L. de Leon		Officer-in-Charge	2004
Leonora J. Nofuente		Officer-in-Charge	2005
Zolaida Banacua		Officer-in-Charge	2006
Bienvenido Cubebe		Officer-in-Charge	January 2007
Pablito S. Vibal		Officer-in-Charge, Principal	August 2007-2013
Concepcion C. Bernaldez		School Principal	2013-2018
Thelma F. Montiel		OIC-Principal	2018-2019
Marilou A. de Jesus		School Principal	2019-2021
Ruel A. Grafil		School Principal	2021-2024
Maria Rhodora P. Espino		School Principal	2024-present

=== Teaching staff ===
There are six school departments in the school, with some subjects merged into one department: English, AP & EsP, Mathematics & MAPEH, Science & ICT, Filipino, and SHS.

== School profile ==
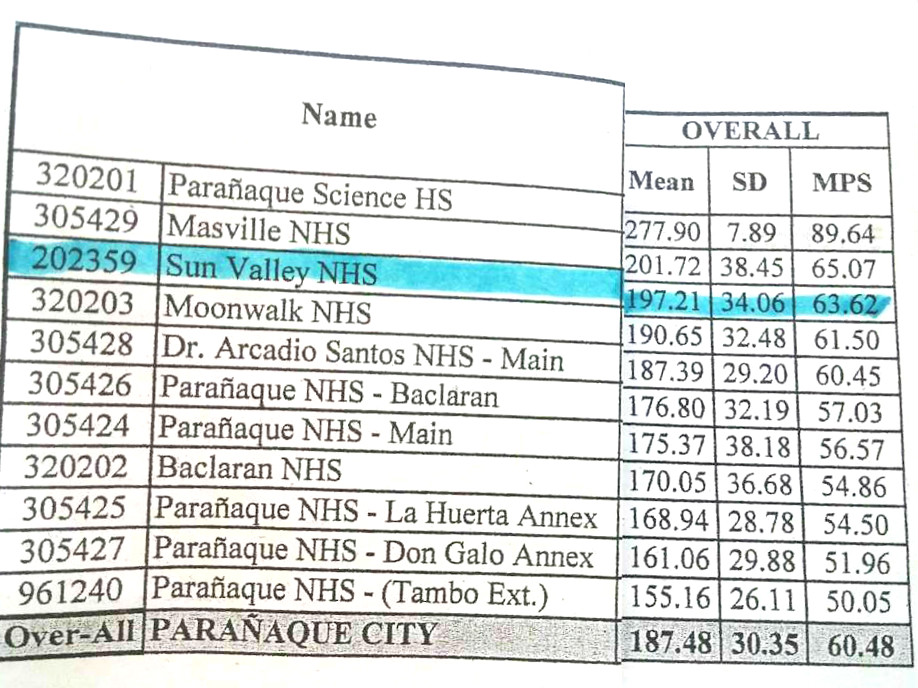
National Achievement Test results for Parañaque

Parañaque Science High School scored an 89.64 average on the National Achievement Test for the school year 2013–2014.

Based on data from SY 2020-2021, there are 272 males and 429 females in the school, making a total of 701 students.

== Student life ==
Like regular public highschools in the country, the school follows a class sectioning of each grade level, to subdivide student rosters into three (3) or four (4) sections; depending on the amount enrolled in a batch, each with their assigned names where students are assigned after enrollment period or registration.

Each class in grade levels are named after a few contemporary factors, depending on the level. Hence, the Junior Highschool's (JHS) sections are named after: stars & constellations (Grade 7-8), authors (Grade 9), Mathematicians (Grade 10), and scientists throughout Senior Highschool (Grade 11-12).

For example; 7-Antares, 8-Cassiopeia, 9-Shakespeare, 10-Pythagoras, 11-Mendel, 12-Einstein.

=== Uniforms ===
The school uniforms for the junior high school uniforms are navy blue and web color royal blue in color. For the male junior high school uniform, the uniform consists of a web color royal blue short-sleeved button-up shirt with a left chest pocket and school logo sewn onto it and navy blue slacks. The female junior high school uniform consists of a web color royal blue blouse with the school logo sewn on the left collar, navy blue bowtie, and skirt. The senior high school uniforms are different since white and navy blue are used as colors for the uniform and the school logo is no longer sewn into the uniforms. For the male senior high school uniform, the uniform consists of a white short-sleeved button-up shirt with a left chest pocket and school logo sewn onto it and navy blue trim, navy blue necktie, black slacks. On the other hand, for the female senior high school uniform, the uniform consists of a white blouse with a navy blue trim, navy blue bowtie, and navy blue pencil skirt. Black shoes are worn for the ordinary school uniforms.

For the junior high school Physical Education uniform, the uniform is a unisex uniform that consists of a web color royal blue cotton shirt and navy blue jogging pants. The senior high school Physical Education uniform is similar to the junior high school uniform however the shirt is white in color.

=== School organizations ===
==== Publications and Media ====
The main school paper of the school is called The Momentum. The paper has separate English and Filipino writing staff, held by young journalism students. It establishes and concludes all known ParSci-related activities such as competitions (division, regional, nationals), curriculum-based activities, sports/intramurals, etc.

The student body/organization is called the PSHS Supreme Secondary Learner Government. It condones the same purpose of The Momentum, but primarily focuses on club-related events and regulatory prospects; Student guidelines and policies.

==== Clubs ====
The school has a variety of clubs with each of their respective roles and activities related to them, ranging from literary to kinesthetic-based activities. A few major clubs consists of;

- English Club
- Mathematics Club
- Athletics Club
- Performing Arts Club
- Media Arts
- Chosen Generation Club

==== Scouts ====
The school has its own Boy and Girl Scouts organization/association, holding and managing their honor and responsibilities as major members of the student body.
