= Index of Metro Manila–related articles =

The location of Metro Manila in the Philippines

The following is an alphabetical list of articles related to the Philippine capital region of Metro Manila.

== 0–9 ==
Map of the 17 local government units of Metro Manila

- 10th Avenue, Caloocan
- 1880 Luzon earthquakes
- 2012 Metro Manila flooding
- 5th Avenue station (Line 1)

== A ==
- Abad Santos Avenue
- Abad Santos station
- Abalos, Benjamin
- Abalos, Benjamin Jr.
- ADB Avenue
- Adjacent provinces:
  - Bulacan
  - Cavite
  - Laguna
  - Rizal
- Adjacent regions:
  - Calabarzon
  - Central Luzon
- Administrative divisions of Metro Manila
- Adriatico Street
- AFP Joint Task Force-National Capital Region
- Airports in the Greater Manila Area
- Alabang
- Alabang railway station
- Alabang Town Center
- Alabang–Zapote Road
- Amorsolo Street
- Anda Circle
- Andres Bonifacio Avenue
- Andrés Bonifacio Monument
- Andrews Avenue
- Annual events in Metro Manila
- Anonas station (Line 2)
- Anonas Street
- Araneta City
- Araneta Center–Cubao station (Line 2)
- Araneta Center–Cubao station (Line 3)
- Arca South
- Arch of the Centuries
- Arcovia City
- Arellano, Juan
- Ark Avilon Zoo
- Arkong Bato
- Arnaiz Avenue
- Arroceros Forest Park
- Art Deco theaters in Metro Manila
- Aseana City
- Aserradora Mecánica de Tuason y Sampedro
- Asistio station
- Assassination of Benigno Aquino, Jr.
- Atienza, Lito
- Aurora Boulevard
- Ayala Alabang
- Ayala Avenue
- Ayala Bridge
- Ayala Center
- Ayala station
- Ayala Triangle Gardens
- Ayuntamiento de Manila
- Azcárraga, Marcelo

== B ==
- Baclaran
- Baclaran Church
- Baclaran station
- Bagatsing, Ramon
- Bagong Pag-asa
- Bagong Silang
- Bagong Silangan
- Bagumbayan North
- Bagumbayan South
- Balangkas
- Balara Filters Park
- Balete Drive
- Balingasa
- Balintawak station
- Bambang, Taguig
- Bambang station
- Bamboo Organ
- Bangkulasi
- Barangays of Metro Manila
- Barangka
- Batasan Hills
- Batasan Road
- Batasan–San Mateo Road
- Batasang Pambansa
- Battle of Bangkusay Channel
- Battles of La Naval de Manila
- Battle of Manila
- Battle of Manila Bay
- Battle of Zapote River
- Bautista, Cipriano
- Bautista, Herbert
- Bay City, Metro Manila
- Bayanan, Muntinlupa
- Baywalk
- Beaches in the Greater Manila Area
- Bel-Air Village
- Belmonte, Feliciano Jr.
- Belmonte, Joy
- Benavides, Miguel de
- Bernardo, Ponciano
- Bernardo Park
- Betty Go-Belmonte station
- Betty Go-Belmonte Street
- BF Homes Parañaque
- BF International Village
- Bicutan Automated Guideway Transit System
- Bicutan railway station
- Bignay
- Binay, Elenita
- Binay, Jejomar
- Binay, Jejomar Jr.
- Binondo
- Binondo–Intramuros Bridge
- Bisig
- Black Nazarene
- Blanco, Francisco Manuel
- Blumentritt station (Line 1)
- Blumentritt railway station
- Blumentritt Road
- Boni Avenue
- Boni station
- Bonifacio, Andrés
- Bonifacio Capital District
- Bonifacio Drive
- Bonifacio Global City
- Bonifacio High Street
- Bonifacio Monument
- Bonifacio Shrine
- Bonny Serrano Avenue
- Bridgetowne
- British invasion of Manila
- Buendia station
- Buendia railway station
- Buli, Muntinlupa
- Bungad
- Bunye, Ignacio
- Bureau of Fire Protection National Capital Region
- Bureau of Jail Management and Penology Regional Office - National Capital Region

== C ==
- Caballo Island
- Caloocan
- Calumpang
- Camp Aguinaldo
- Camp Atienza
- Camp Crame
- Capitol Commons
- Carlos, Emerson
- Carlos, Jose Emmanuel
- Carmona
- Carriedo Fountain
- Carriedo station
- Casa Manila
- Casino Español de Manila
- Cayetano, Lani
- Celestino, Canuto E.
- Cemeteries in Metro Manila
- Central Signal, Taguig
- Central Terminal station (Line 1)
- Century City, Makati
- Chavacano
- Chino Roces Avenue
- Circuit Makati
- Circulo Verde
- Circumferential Road 1
- Circumferential Road 2
- Circumferential Road 3
- Circumferential Road 4
- Circumferential Road 5
- Circumferential Road 6
- City of Dreams Manila
- City of Greater Manila
- City of Man
- Club Filipino
- Coat of arms of Manila
- Coconut Palace
- Commonwealth Avenue
- Compañía General de Tabacos de Filipinas
- Conspiracy of the Maharlikas
- Cornejo, Miguel
- Corregidor
- Crossings of the Pasig River
- Crossings of the Marikina River
- Cruz-Araneta, Gemma
- Cruz-Herrera, Arsenio
- Cry of Pugad Lawin
- Cultural Center of the Philippines Complex
- Cultural Properties of the Philippines in Metro Manila
- Cuneta, Pablo
- Cupang

== D ==
- Daang Hari Road
- Daanghari
- Dagala, Bernardo O.
- Dalandanan
- Dasmariñas Village
- De Guzman, Del
- De los Santos, Epifanio
- Del Pilar Street
- Dewey, George
- Diario de Manila
- Diego Cera Avenue
- Domestic Road
- Don Bosco, Parañaque
- Don Galo
- Doña Soledad Avenue
- Doroteo Jose station
- Dr. Santos Avenue

== E ==
- Eastern Police District
- Eastwood City
- EDSA
- EDSA station (Line 1)
- EDSA railway station
- EDSA Shrine
- EDSA III
- Ejercito, JV
- El Deposito
- El Fraile Island
- Elliptical Road
- Elpidio Quirino Avenue
- Entertainment City
- Ermita
- Escolta Street
- España Boulevard
- España railway station
- Estrada, Joseph
- Estrella Street
- Eton Centris

== F ==
- Far Eastern Championship Games
- Far Eastern University
- Fernando, Bayani
- Fernando, Marides
- Filinvest City
- Filipino language
- Fire District II
- Fire District III
- Fire District IV
- Forbes Park
- Fort Bonifacio
- Fort Bonifacio (barangay)
- Fort San Antonio Abad
- Fort Santiago
- Fort William McKinley
- Freedom Island
- FTI railway station

== G ==
- Gambling in Metro Manila
- Gatchalian, Rexlon
- Gatchalian, Sherwin
- Gates of Intramuros
- Geography of Manila
- Gil Puyat Avenue
- Gil Puyat station
- Gilmore Avenue
- Gilmore station (Line 2)
- Ginebra San Miguel
- Glorieta Park
- Goiti, Martin de
- Golden Mosque
- Gomez, Guia
- Gonzales, Neptali II
- Governor Pascual Avenue
- Governor Pascual station
- Greater Manila Area
- Greenfield District
- Greenhills (mixed-use development)
- Gregorio Araneta Avenue
- Guadalupe Nuevo
- Guadalupe station (Line 3)
- Guerrero, León María
- Guinto, Leon

== H ==
- Harbor Defenses of Manila and Subic Bays
- Harper, Bambi
- Harrison Avenue
- Harrison Plaza
- Harrison, Francis Burton
- Hidalgo Street
- Historical markers of the Philippines in Metro Manila
- History of Manila
- Hospicio de San Jose
- Hospitals in Metro Manila
- Hotels in Metro Manila
- Huerta, Felix

== I ==
- Imperial Manila
- Inocentes, Oscar
- Insular Ice Plant
- Intramuros
- Isla
- Isla de Convalecencia
- Isla Pulo
- Islands in the Greater Manila Area

== J ==
- J.P. Rizal Avenue
- J. Ruiz station
- Jamboree Lake
- Jones Bridge
- José W. Diokno Boulevard
- José P. Laurel Street
- José María of Manila
- Juan Ruiz Street
- Julia Vargas Avenue

== K ==
- Kalaw Avenue
- Kalayaan Avenue
- Kamuning station
- Karuhatan
- Katipunan Avenue
- Katipunan station (Line 2)
- KidZania Manila
- Krus na Ligas

== L ==
- La Huerta
- La Loma Cemetery
- La Mesa Dam and Reservoir
- La Mesa Watershed Reservation
- La Monja Island
- Lacson Avenue
- Lacson, Arsenio
- Laguna de Bay
- Laguna Lake Development Authority
- Lakandula
- Land reclamation in Metro Manila
- Laong Laan railway station
- Las Piñas
- Las Piñas Church
- Las Piñas–Parañaque Critical Habitat and Ecotourism Area
- Lawang Bato
- Lawton Avenue
- Legarda station
- Legarda Street
- Legazpi, Miguel López de
- Legazpi Active Park
- Legislative districts of Caloocan
- Legislative district of Las Piñas
- Legislative districts of Makati
- Legislative district of Malabon
- Legislative district of Mandaluyong
- Legislative districts of Manila
- Legislative districts of Marikina
- Legislative district of Muntinlupa
- Legislative district of Navotas
- Legislative districts of Parañaque
- Legislative district of Pasay
- Legislative district of Pasig
- Legislative district of Pateros-Taguig
- Legislative districts of Quezon City
- Legislative district of San Juan, Metro Manila
- Legislative district of Taguig
- Legislative districts of Valenzuela
- Letre Road
- Libertad station
- Libingan ng mga Bayani
- Libraries in Metro Manila
- Light Rail Manila Corporation
- Light Rail Transit Authority
- Lim, Alfredo
- Liwasang Bonifacio
- Lopez, Mel
- Luneta Hotel

== M ==
- Ma Mon Luk
- Mabini Bridge
- Macapagal Boulevard
- MacArthur Highway
- Magallanes Interchange
- Magallanes station
- Magat Salamat
- Magsaysay Boulevard
- Maharlika Village
- Makati
- Makati Avenue
- Makati Business Club
- Makati Central Business District
- Makati Poblacion
- Makati Poblacion Park
- Malabon
- Malabon People's Park
- Malacañang Palace
- Malanday
- Malapitan, Oscar
- Malate, Manila
- Malate Church
- Malonzo, Rey
- Mandaluyong
- Mangangate River
- Manggahan Floodway
- Manila
- Manila (province)
- Manila American Cemetery and Memorial
- Manila Army and Navy Club
- Manila Bay
- Manila Cathedral
- Manila Central Post Office
- Manila Chinese Cemetery
- Manila City Council
- Manila City Hall
- Manila Commodity Exchange
- Manila Elks Club
- Manila Film Center
- Manila Fire District
- Manila galleon
- Manila Grand Opera House
- Manila hostage crisis
- Manila Hotel
- Manila International Airport Authority
- Manila Jai Alai Building
- Manila Light Rail Transit System
- Manila massacre
- Manila Metro Rail Transit System
- Manila Metropolitan Theater
- Manila Mint
- Manila North Cemetery
- Manila Observatory
- Manila Ocean Park
- Manila Police District
- Manila (song)
- Manila Sound
- Manila South Cemetery
- Manila Thermal Power Plant
- Manila Water
- Manila Zoo
- Manila–Cavite Expressway
- Mapúa, Tomás
- Marcos, Imelda
- Marcos Road
- Marikina
- Marikina Heights
- Marikina River
- Marikina River Park
- Marikina Valley Fault System
- Marikina–Infanta Highway
- Marquez, Joey
- Mathay, Mel
- Maynila (historical polity)
- Maynilad Water Services
- Maysan Road
- McKinley Road
- Mega Manila
- Mega Manila Subway
- Mehan Garden
- Mendiola Street
- Meralco
- Meralco Avenue
- Metro Manila website
  - Category:Metro Manila
    - commons:Category:Metro Manila
      - commons:Category:Maps of Metro Manila
- Metro Manila Dream Plan
- Metro Manila Film Festival
- Metro Manila Popular Music Festival
- Metro Rail Transit Corporation
- Metropolitan Manila Development Authority
- Metropolitan mountaineering society
- Metropolitan Waterworks and Sewerage System
- Mindanao Avenue
- Molino Dam
- Monumento station
- Morato, Tomas
- Morong District
- Muntinlupa
- Muntinlupa Poblacion
- Muntinlupa railway station
- Muntinlupa Sunken Garden
- Muntinlupa–Cavite Expressway
- Museums in Metro Manila

== N ==
- NAIA Expressway
- NAIA Road
- Nakpil, Carmen Guerrero
- Namayan
- Namayan, Mandaluyong
- Napindan
- National Capital Region Police Office
- National Capital Regional Command
- National Center for Mental Health
- Navotas
- Navotas Centennial Park
- Navotas East
- Navotas West
- New Bilibid Prison
- New Lower Bicutan
- Newport City, Metro Manila
- Newspapers published in Metro Manila
- Nicanor Garcia Street
- Nichols Field
- Nichols railway station
- Nicknames of Manila
- Nielson Field
- Nilad plant
- Ninoy Aquino Avenue
- Ninoy Aquino International Airport
- Ninoy Aquino Parks & Wildlife Center
- North Avenue
- North Avenue station (Line 3)
- North Bay Boulevard
- North Luzon Expressway
- North Port Passenger Terminal
- Northbay Boulevard North
- Northbay Boulevard South
- Northern Police District
- Novales, Andrés
- Nuestra Señora del Buen Suceso de Parañaque

== O ==
- Ocampo, Ambeth
- Ocampo, Fernando H.
- Old Legislative Building
- Onse, San Juan
- Orbos, Thomas
- Oreta, Tito
- Ortigas Avenue
- Ortigas Center
- Ortigas Interchange
- Ortigas station (Line 3)
- Our Lady of La Naval de Manila

== P ==
- Pablo Ocampo Street
- Paco, Manila
- Paco Park
- Paco railway station
- Padre Burgos Avenue
- Padre Faura Street
- Palasan
- Pandacan
- Pandacan railway station
- Pancit Malabon
- Parañaque
- Parañaque Cathedral
- Parañaque River
- Parián (Manila)
- Pariancillo Villa
- Parks in Metro Manila
- Parklinks
- Pasay
- Pasay Road railway station
- Paseo de Roxas
- Pasig
- Pasig Cathedral
- Pasig Rainforest Park
- Pasig River
- Pasig River Ferry
- Pasig River Light
- Pasig River Rehabilitation Commission
- Paterno, Dolores
- Pateros
- Payatas
- Pedro Gil station
- Pedro Gil Street
- People from Metro Manila
- People's Park (Valenzuela)
- People Power Monument
- People Power Revolution
- PH-00 – ISO 3166-2:PH region code for the National Capital Region of Metro Manila
- Philippine Constabulary Metropolitan Command
- Philippine International Convention Center
- Philippine National Railways
- Philippines–Thailand Friendship Circle
- Pinaglabanan Shrine
- Pinagsama
- Pinyahan
- Pioneer Street
- Pitogo, Makati
- Plaza de Armas
- Plaza Dilao
- Plaza de España
- Plaza Lacson
- Plaza de Mexico
- Plaza Miranda
- Plaza Moraga
- Plaza Moriones
- Plaza Rajah Sulayman
- Plaza de Roma
- Plaza San Lorenzo Ruiz
- PNR Metro South Commuter Line
- Polo
- Pollution of the Pasig River
- Port Area, Manila
- Port of Manila
- Post of Manila
- Prehistory of Manila
- Public transport in Metro Manila
- Puente Colgante
- Puente de España
- Punturin
- Pureza station
- Pureza Street
- Putatan

== Q ==
- Quezon Avenue
- Quezon Avenue station (Line 3)
- Quezon Boulevard
- Quezon City
- Quezon City Fire District
- Quezon City Police District
- Quezon Memorial Circle
- Quiapo, Manila
- Quiapo Church
- Quirino Avenue
- Quirino Grandstand
- Quirino Highway
- Quirino station (Line 1)

== R ==
- R. Papa station
- Radial Road 1
- Radial Road 2
- Radial Road 3
- Radial Road 4
- Radial Road 5
- Radial Road 6
- Radial Road 7
- Radial Road 8
- Radial Road 9
- Radial Road 10
- Radio stations in Metro Manila
- Rail transit stations in the Greater Manila Area
- Rajah Matanda
- Rajah Sulayman
- Real Audiencia of Manila
- Recto Avenue
- Recto station
- Regalado Highway
- Rehabilitation of the Pasig River
- Religious buildings in Metro Manila
- Remedios Circle
- Resorts World Manila
- Riverbanks Center
- Rivers and estuaries in Metro Manila
- Rizal
- Rizal Avenue
- Rizal Day bombings
- Rizal Memorial Sports Complex
- Rizal Monument
- Rizal Park
- Rizal Shrine
- Roads in Metro Manila
- Robinsons Cybergate
- Rockwell Center
- Rodriguez, Eulogio
- Roman Catholic Archdiocese of Manila
- Roman Catholic churches in Metro Manila
- Roman Catholic Diocese of Antipolo
- Roman Catholic Diocese of Cubao
- Roman Catholic Diocese of Imus
- Roman Catholic Diocese of Kalookan
- Roman Catholic Diocese of Malolos
- Roman Catholic Diocese of Novaliches
- Roman Catholic Diocese of Parañaque
- Roman Catholic Diocese of Pasig
- Roman Catholic Diocese of San Pablo
- Roosevelt Avenue
- Roosevelt station (Line 1)
- Roxas Boulevard
- Ruiz, Lorenzo

== S ==
- Salcedo, Juan de
- Salcedo Park
- Salonga, Asiong
- Sampaloc, Manila
- Sampaloc Church
- Samson Road
- Sangley Rebellion
- San Agustin Church
- San Andres, Manila
- San Andres railway station
- San Antonio, Parañaque
- San Antonio, Quezon City
- San Dionisio, Parañaque
- San Isidro, Parañaque
- San Jose, Navotas
- San Juan, Metro Manila
- San Juan River
- San Juan River Bridge
- San Lazaro Tourism and Business Park
- San Martin de Porres, Parañaque
- San Miguel Church
- San Miguel Brewery
- San Miguel Corporation
- San Miguel, Manila
- San Nicolas, Manila
- San Rafael Village
- San Roque, Navotas
- San Sebastian Church
- Santa Ana, Manila
- Santa Ana, Taguig
- Santa Ana Church
- Santa Ana Historic Houses
- Santa Cruz, Manila
- Santa Cruz, Quezon City
- Santa Cruz Bridge
- Santa Cruz Church
- Santa Elena, Marikina
- Santa Marta de Pateros
- Santa Mesa
- Santa Mesa railway station
- Santo Niño, Parañaque
- Santo Tomas Internment Camp
- Santolan station (Line 2)
- Santolan station (Line 3)
- Sapang Baho River
- Sarao Motors
- Schools in Metro Manila
- Second EDSA Revolution
- Seng Guan Temple
- Shaw Boulevard
- Shaw Boulevard station
- Shopping malls in Metro Manila
- Sierra Madre (Philippines)
- Singkamas
- Sipac-Almacen
- List of sister cities in Metro Manila
- Skyway
- Slums in Manila
- SM Mall of Asia
- SM Mall of Asia Arena
- Smart Araneta Coliseum
- Smokey Mountain
- Socorro, Quezon City
- Solaire Resort & Casino
- Solis station
- Songs about Manila
- South Avenue, Manila
- South Luzon Expressway
- Southern Police District
- Sporting events in the Greater Manila Area
- Sports venues in the Greater Manila Area
- Star City
- Sucat People's Park
- Sucat railway station

== T ==
- Taft Avenue
- Taft Avenue station
- Tagalag
- Tagalog language
- Tagalog people
- Taglish
- Tagle, Luis Antonio
- Taguig
- Taguig People's Park
- Taguig River
- Takayama, Dom Justo
- Tallest buildings in Metro Manila
- Tambo
- Tandang Sora Avenue
- Tanduay
- Tanghalang Francisco Balagtas
- Tanghalang Pambansa
- Tangos
- Tangos North
- Tangos South
- Tanza
- Tayuman station
- Tayuman Street
- Theaters and concert halls in Metro Manila
- Thirteen Martyrs of Bagumbayan
- Thrilla in Manila
- Tiangco, John Rey
- Tiangco, Toby
- Timeline of Manila
- Timog Avenue
- Tinajeros
- Tiñga, Sigfrido
- Tolentino, Francis
- Tomas Morato Avenue
- Tondo, Manila
- Tondo (historical polity)
- Tondo Church
- Tourism in Metro Manila
- Tramo Street
- Transportation in Metro Manila
- Treaty of Manila
- Triangle Park
- Tugatog
- Tuktukan
- Tullahan River
- Tunasan
- Tunasan River
- Tutuban Center
- Tutuban railway station

== U ==
- Ugong
- Unified Vehicular Volume Reduction Program
- United Nations Avenue
- United Nations station
- Universities and colleges in Metro Manila
- University Belt
- University of the Philippines Arboretum
- University of the Philippines Diliman Automated Guideway Transit System
- University of Santo Tomas
- UP Village
- Upper Bicutan
- U.S. Naval Radio Facility Bagobantay

== V ==
- V. Mapa station
- Valentino, Rodolfo B.
- Valenzuela
- Vargas, Jorge B.
- Veinte Reales
- Veterans Village
- Victorino Mapa Street
- Vidal, Sebastián
- Villamor Air Base
- Villegas, Antonio
- Vito Cruz station

== W ==
- Washington Sycip Park
- Water privatization in Metro Manila
- Welcome Rotonda
- Western Bicutan
- World Trade Center Metro Manila

== Y ==
- Ynchausti y Compañia

== Z ==
- Zapote Bridge
- Zapote Line
- Zóbel de Ayala, Enrique
- Zorrilla Theater

== See also ==
- Topic overview:
  - Metro Manila
  - Outline of Metro Manila
