= Annual events in Metro Manila =

Events in Philippine region

Numerous events and festivals are held annually in Metro Manila. They include:

== January ==
- Feast of the Black Nazarene - a grand festival that centers on the image of the Black Nazarene which was transported by a galleon from Mexico to Manila in the 17th century. The festival is marked by a day-long procession by thousands of devotees to the Quiapo district from Rizal Park, where the image was first enshrined.
- Feast of Santo Niño - a grand procession of over two hundred well-dressed images of the Child Jesus held in Tondo and Pandacan districts. In addition, celebrations are mounted in parishes and chapels dedicated to the image all over Metro Manila.
- Caracol Festival - Official street festival of Makati with environmental themes.
- Pangisdaan Festival - One of the highlights of the Navotas Day celebration featuring a street dancing and float competition focusing on the fishing industry.
- Feast of Saint Sebastian - official village festival of Pinagbuhatan in Pasig.

== February ==
- International Bamboo Organ Festival - A ten-day series of cultural events and music festival, with a focus on the unique bamboo-made organ made by Fray Diego Cera found only in Las Piñas.
- Chinese New Year - a recent national holiday most celebrated with great revelry in Binondo district, the world's oldest Chinatown. Celebrations are held in major malls and hotels.
- Philippine International Pyromusical Competition - an annual competition among the world's fireworks companies held at SM Mall of Asia in Pasay.
- Travel Tour Expo - Annual exhibition of travel and tourism destinations, products and services held in SM Megamall in Mandaluyong.
- Feast of Santa Clara - Celebrated in Pasay. Highlights include the Serenata and The Tiburin Race. Serenata is a series of rondalla and brass band concerts and a revival of open-air musical performances held at the Santa Clara patio, while the Tiburin Race is an exciting and thrilling horse-racing along Arnaiz Avenue.
- Sambalilo Festival - Hat festival celebrated in Parañaque.
- Lavandero Festival - As part of the week-long Mandaluyong Day celebration, the unique festival focused on the city’s ancient tradition of washing clothes in the once clean and clear waters of the Pasig River.
- Pamaypay ng Caloocan Festival - One of the highlights of Caloocan Foundation Day, showcasing the use of the "Pamaypay"/fan as traditional tool to the surging heat as exhibited in techno-modern folk street dancing competition.
- Itik-Itik Festival - "Duck" festival held every last Sunday of February in Kalawaan, Pasig in honor of Saint Martha.

== March ==
- Malibay Cenaculo - A 10-day activity during Semana Santa commencing with daily performances of particular scenes from the Bible stories. Different scenes are performed by Cenaculistas of Pasay.
- Balut sa Puti Festival - an annual town-wide celebration along with "Araw ng Pateros" (Foundation Day) featuring the infamous Balut, it is celebrated with various activities such as culinary competition, kamayan (boodle fight), free concert, and more.
- Pasig Summer Music Festival - On this event, artists, and music lovers gather at the Pasig City Museum to listen and appreciate the music of classical artists.
- Parade of Festivals - One of the highlights of Muntinlupa's Cityhood Anniversary.

== April ==
- Manila International Auto Show - the biggest motor show in the Philippines.
- Aliwan Fiesta - held annually in the Cultural Center of the Philippines Complex, it is a celebration of Filipino culture through dance parades, floats, and pageants. Aliwan Fiesta is organized by the Manila Broadcasting Company together with the Cultural Center of the Philippines and the city governments of Pasay and Manila. It is one of the biggest summer events in the capital region.
- Sunduan Festival - A colorful procession of 2 barangays in Pasig sharing one patron saint: Santa Rosa de Lima.
- Ka-Angkan Festival - also known as Feast of Clans, it is celebrated during the foundation anniversary of Marikina. It is a great festival of the families that have made the city their home.
- Wanderland Music and Arts Festival - an outdoor music and arts festival held annually at Circuit Makati.

== May ==
- Flores de Mayo - Also known as Santacruzan, it is a parade of the region's loveliest ladies depicting the search and discovery of Christ's Cross by Queen Helena and Constantine. Held all over the capital region month-long, schedule depends on the communities hosting the event.
- Feast of Nuestra Señora de Guia - A fiesta in honor of one of the oldest Marian images in the Philippines - the La Nuestra Señora de Guia, patroness of seafarers and also known as Our Lady of Expectations. The main event of the fiesta is the Bota de Flores, a reenactment of a select group of young ladies and their escorts in sailor costumes of the procession returning the La Nuestra Señora de Guia to its reconstructed shrine in Ermita in 1918.
- Manila Music Festival
- San Roque Festival - Also known as Mano Po San Roque Festival, it includes street dancing and procession along Valenzuela's major thoroughfares in commemoration of the feast of San Roque.
- Sunduan Festival - The traditional rites means literally "to pick up the girl at the house", it is held in La Huerta, Parañaque.

== June ==
- Independence Day - a national holiday celebrating the independence of the Philippines from Spain in 1898. Major highlights in the region include a flag ceremony at the Independence Flagpole in Rizal Park, as well as other places of significance and a fireworks display at Malacañang Palace.
- Manila Day - Also known as Araw ng Maynila, it is a yearly celebration of the city's founding anniversary featuring various cultural activities.
- Feast of Saint John the Baptist - A celebration of San Juan's patron saint characterized by vigorous and boisterous streetdancing with the Wattah Wattah Festival and "Santong Tao" (live saints) parade.
- Feast of Saints Peter and Paul - held in Makati with performances of the Bailes de Arcos by daughters of past participants with impeccable reputations as homage to the Virgen dela Rosa for her kindness.
- Philippine International Jazz and Arts Festival - also known as PI JazzFest, it features live jazz music and concerts all around the city.
- Fête de la Musique - the region's largest musical event takes place each June and boasts a number of events spread all over the metropolis hosting over 150 musical acts, with well-known Filipino talents billed, as well as some huge international stars.
- Subli-an sa Maynila - A cultural and religious event, this festivity is held in honour of the Holy Cross. The traditional dance ‘Subli’ is used as a ritual to honour the Holy Cross, accompanied by a vocal quartet.

== July ==
- Cinemanila International Film Festival - the biggest global film event in Manila.
- Cinemalaya Philippine Independent Film Festival - a film festival held annually in at the Cultural Center of the Philippines Complex which features independent films.
- Pasig Day - known in Filipino as Araw ng Pasig, it is a grand celebration of the city's foundation day highlighted by different activities like the Mutya ng Pasig Pageant and Dancing Parade.

== August ==
- Language Month and Birth Anniversary of Manuel L. Quezon - Celebrations held all over the month of August to honor the Filipino language and Commonwealth President Manuel L. Quezon, who was responsible for its foundation. Major events are held on August 19 in Quezon City with a flag-raising and a wreath-laying ceremony and major celebrations held to honor the language. In addition, there are celebrations held in the same city in celebration of its establishment in 1939.
- Anniversary of Cry of Pugadlawin - A historical event celebrated yearly with a civic parade at 6:00 am followed by a flag-raising and a wreath-laying ceremony in Quezon City.
- Pinaglabanan Day - celebration of the Battle of Pinaglabanan, a historic event in San Juan which sparked the Philippine Revolution of 1896.
- 29 de Agosto - Mandaluyong observes its First Cry of Revolution against Spaniards in 1896, with a special day of activities dedicated to the city's role in the independence struggle. A commemorative program and an evening of Kundiman are special activities for the occasion.
- Nagsabado Festival - A re-enactment of the revolutionary action against the Spaniards led by Valentin Cruz and Andres Bonifacio in Pasig City in August 1896. The historic revolution happened to fall on a Saturday, hence the festival's name.

== September ==
- Kalesa Festival - This cultural festival is held to pay tribute to the preservation of old fashioned horse-drawn carriages, locally known as kalesa. The celebration also features a lot of musical performances, dancing and singing.

== October ==
- Feast of La Naval de Manila - A festival revolving around the image of the Blessed Virgin Mary of La Naval carved in 1533 and given as a gift to the Dominican Fathers. Borne on an elaborately decorated and well-lit carriage in the form of a ship, the venerated image is brought out of the church preceded by 26 images of the Dominican saints. The procession goes around the main streets of Sto. Domingo Church in Quezon City (also known as the National Shrine of Our Lady of the Rosary of La Naval de Manila) and then returns to the church amidst applause until it reaches the altar pedestal.
- Spanish Film Festival in Manila

== November ==
- Manila International Literary Festival
- Manila Salsa Congress
- Feast of Nuestra Señora de los Remedios - held in Malate district, this festival is in honour of one of Manila's patron saints and features, among other events, a large-scale procession through the streets with a statue of the saint at the head.

== December ==
- Feast of the Immaculate Conception - A revival of religious tradition with more than 80 images of the Blessed Virgin Mary from various parishes and provinces paraded around the streets of Intramuros in a Grand Marian Procession, held every First Sunday of December.
- Metro Manila Film Festival - an annual film festival which focuses on locally produced films.
- Sapatero Festival - an annual shoe festival showcases the different shoes produced in the Shoe Capital of the Philippines, Marikina.
- Marikina Christmas Festival - an annual Christmas festival in Marikina featuring bazaars, amusement parks, concerts, a fireworks display and food caravans in 3 key areas in the city, Riverbanks Center, Marikina River and Marikina City Hall.
- Pancit Malabon Festival - Also known as Luglugan Festival, it also commemorates the feast of Immaculate Concepcion, Malabon's patron saint.
- UP Lantern Parade - an annual Christmas parade and competition of the University of the Philippines, featuring specialized lantern displays made by participating colleges of the university, capped with a fireworks display.
- UST Paskuhan - The Christmas festivities of the University of Santo Tomas.
- Pakalog Festival - the annual New Year's celebrations held in Santolan, Pasig. It is one of the only places in Metro Manila that does not permit fireworks and firecrackers on New Year's Eve.

== See also ==
- List of festivals in the Philippines
- List of sporting events in Metro Manila
- Entertainment events at the SM Mall of Asia
