= UST Paskuhan =

Culmination of Christmas activities

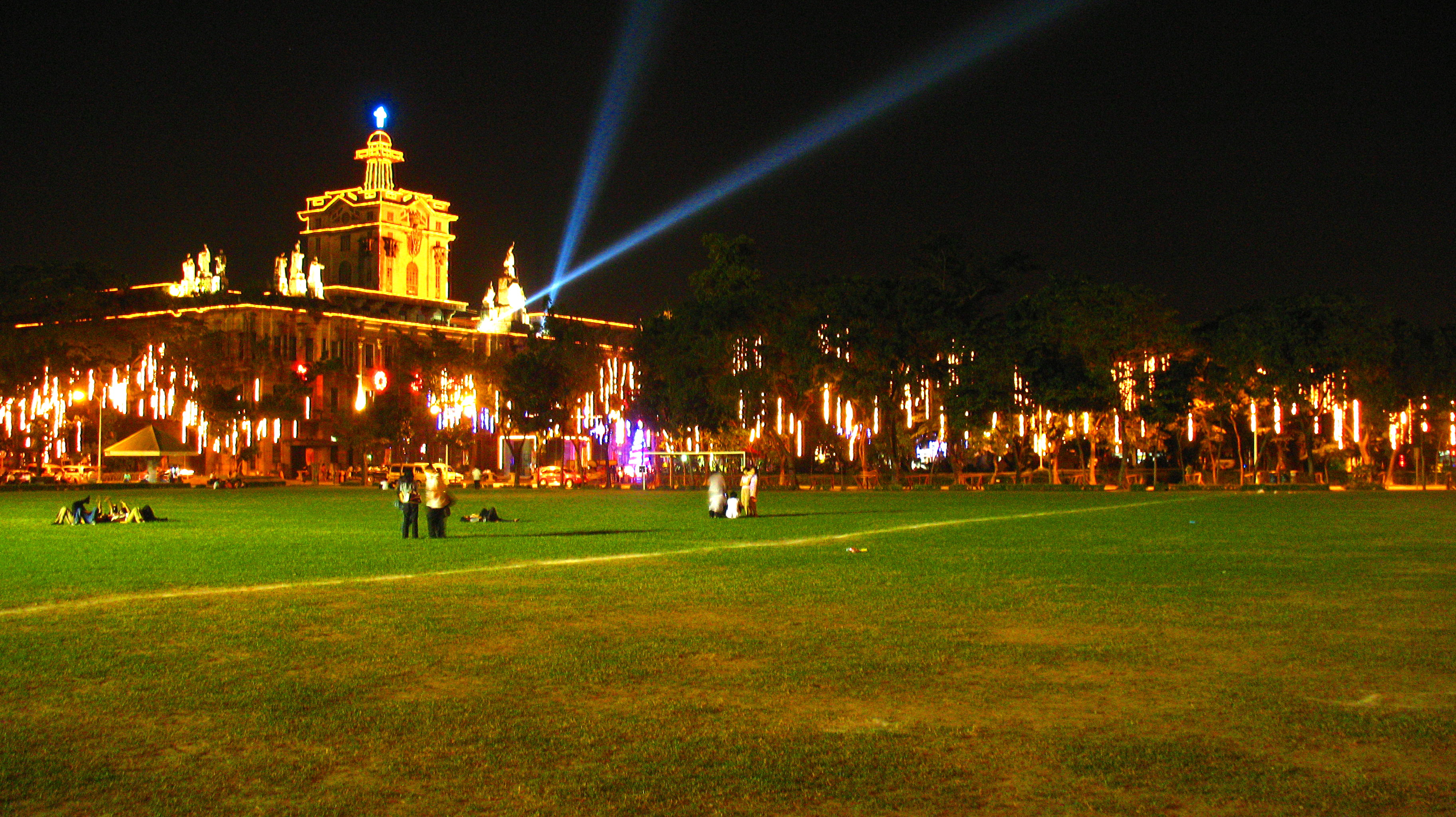
- Christmas decorations at UST during Paskuhan in 2007
- Status: Active
- Frequency: Annual
- Years active: 25
- Inaugurated: 19 December 1991
- Previous event: 20 December 2025
- Next event: 18 December 2026
- Attendance: 48,309 (2025)

The Paskuhan is the culmination of the university-wide Christmas activities of the University of Santo Tomas in Manila, Philippines. The annual tradition started in 1991. The programs of Paskuhan are held during the last week or last day before the Christmas break of the university. In 2014, however, because of the change in the academic calendar of the university, it was scheduled in the Feast of the Immaculate Conception on December 8, 2014. It was later rescheduled to December 11, 2014, because of Typhoon Ruby.

== Event ==
One of the highlights of the celebration is the Panunuluyan or the re-enactment of the Virgin Mary and St. Joseph's search for a place for Mary to give birth to Jesus Christ. The Paskuhan Mass comes shortly after and is usually presided by the university rector. Current students and university employees are also treated in the Agape or the campus-wide banquet. The Agape in Paskuhan started in 2011, following the Agape of the Quadricentennial Celebration.

In some editions of the Paskuhan, the celebration started with a festive parade from the different faculties and colleges.

== History ==
=== Beginnings ===
The first Christmas celebration in the university was held on December 19, 1991, with the theme, “Paskong Tomasino, Paskong Filipino ’91.” It featured a Holy Mass, held in the UST Grandstand, the Panunuluyan, which was participated by the different faculties and colleges, and an inter-collegiate lantern-making contest. A 14-foot Christmas tree was also erected at the UST Grandstand where students placed their donations for the victims of the Mount Pinatubo eruption and Tropical Storm Uring (International name: Thelma) in Ormoc City.

It was in 1993 that the celebration was formally named as Paskuhan. The celebration was a simple gathering spearheaded by the then UST Treasurer Fr. Tereso Campillo, O.P.

A more festive Paskuhan was held in 1994 to celebrate the upcoming World Youth Day in January 1995. It featured for the first time the 80-foot Christmas tree, which was first designed by UST College of Architecture and Fine Arts professor Rey Mañago.

=== Succeeding years ===
In 2004, funds for the celebration were donated to the victims of the 4 typhoons that struck the country.

=== Present day (2009-present) ===
In 2009, the Paskuhan was entitled as, 4 horas, 4 dias, 4 hundred days, 400 years to coincide with the university's countdown programs of the Quadricentennial Year. The celebration began at 8:00 p.m. of December 18, until 12:00am of December 19, which was 4 days before December 22, exactly 400 days before January 28, 2011.

The Paskuhan Mass in 2012 was celebrated by the Very Rev. Bruno Cadoré, O.P., the Master of the Order of Preachers and chancellor of the university. Rev. Fr. Herminio Dagohoy, O.P., the university rector, served as the homilist.

In 2013, the celebration served for a cause as mass offerings were donated to the victims of Super Typhoon Yolanda (International name: Haiyan).

In 2014, the Paskuhan festivities were moved from December 8 to December 11 because of Typhoon Ruby (International name: Hagupit). The forthcoming visit of Pope Francis to the university in January 2015 became the main theme of the celebration.

The programs in the 2015 edition were likewise modified because of the Typhoon Nona (International name: Melor). The Mass was moved to the Quadricentennial Pavilion and the concert was held at the UST Practice Gym.

The festivities returned in-person in 2022 after 2 years of holding it virtually. The month-long celebration began on December 2, 2022, with the staging of the Christmas Concert at Plaza Mayor, opening of the campus lights, and Agape.

The Paskuhan was also one of the events used by UST in theming the opening ceremony of UAAP Season 88 in 2025.

== Themes ==
Titles and crowd attendance
Date	Title	Estimated crowd	Ref.
December 19, 1991	Paskong Tomasino: Paskong Filipino ’91		
December 16, 2004			
December 20, 2006	Pride, Puso, Pasasalamat!		
December 15–19, 2008	Kwentong Pasko, Kwentong Tomasino!		
December 18, 2009	4 horas, 4 dias, 400 days, 400 taon	50,000	
December 15–17, 2010	Pasasalamat sa 400 Taong Biyaya	75,000	
December 15–16, 2011	Pagsalubong para sa ika-5 Siglo	100,000	
December 18 and 21, 2012	Pagdiriwang sa Pananampalataya	70,000	
December 20, 2013	Pasko sa Puso Ko	60,000	
December 11, 2014	Pagdiriwang ng Pagmamalasakit: Tomasino Kaisa ni Papa Francisco at ng Simbahan sa Pasko. Paskuhan Full Blast	70,000	
December 17–18, 2015	A Thomasian Celebration of Christmas and the Jubilees of Mercy and 800th Dominican Foundation Year.		
December 15–16, 2016	Paskong Tomasino Para Sa‘yo	60,000	
December 1–20, 2017	K.o.K. (King of Kings)	60,000	
December 3–21, 2018	Light from Light, Prince of Peace	70,000	
December 2–20, 2019	For Unto Us, A Child is Born.	105,000	
December 2-19, 2022	Pananabik, Pagbabalik, Panunumbalik	51,000	
December 2-21, 2023	Witnessing the Joy of Christmas	39,000	
December 2-20, 2024	Ever Thankful, Ever Hopeful	42,000	
November 28 - December 19, 2025	Light Among Us, Hope Through Us	48,000	

== Light displays ==
Since 2011, a pyromusical by Dragon Fireworks culminates the program.

Projection mapping was incorporated in 2015, where the UST Main Building was used as the surface.

A drone show by DroneTech was introduced in 2019 during the Agape. It was used again in 2024 and 2025.
