= Molino Dam =

Dam in Las Piñas, Philippines

Coordinates: 14.43846°N 120.97538°E

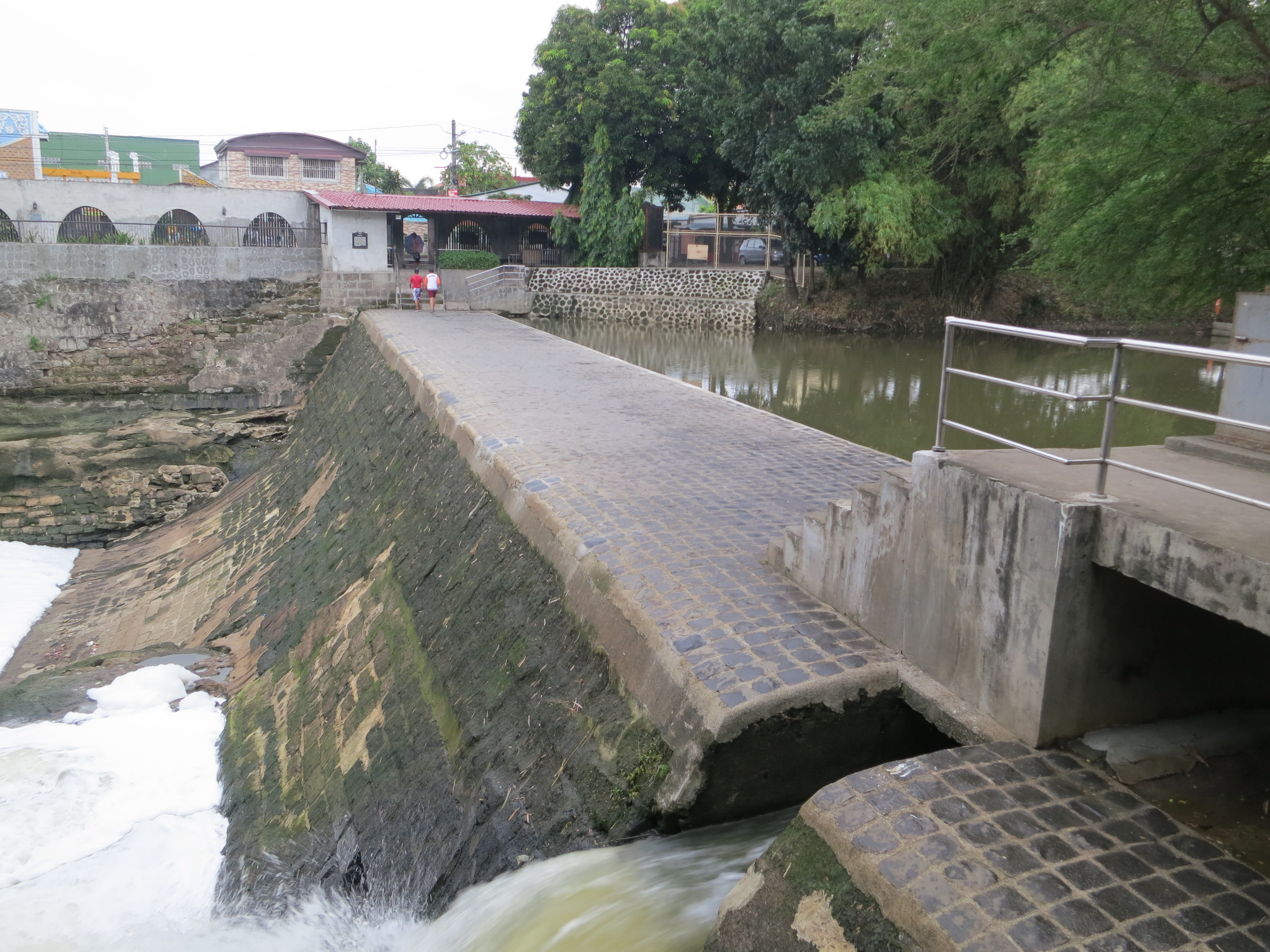
- Molino Dam from the Bacoor end

- Location in Metro Manila Location in Luzon Location in the Philippines
- Country: Philippines
- Location: Barangay San Nicolas, Bacoor, Cavite and Barangay Talon Dos, Las Piñas, Metro Manila
- Status: Used as a footbridge connecting Las Piñas and Bacoor, Cavite
- Construction began: April 24, 1885

Dam and spillways
- Impounds: Zapote River Watershed
- Height: 10 m (33 ft)
- Length: 450 m (1,480 ft)
- Width (base): 600 m (2,000 ft)

The Molino Dam or Prinza Water Dam is a gravity dam on the Zapote River located on the border between Barangay San Nicolas I, Bacoor, Cavite and Barangay Talon Dos, Las Piñas, Metro Manila, Philippines. It was built by hand in the 19th century to irrigate the surrounding rice field in Las Piñas and Bacoor.

== History ==
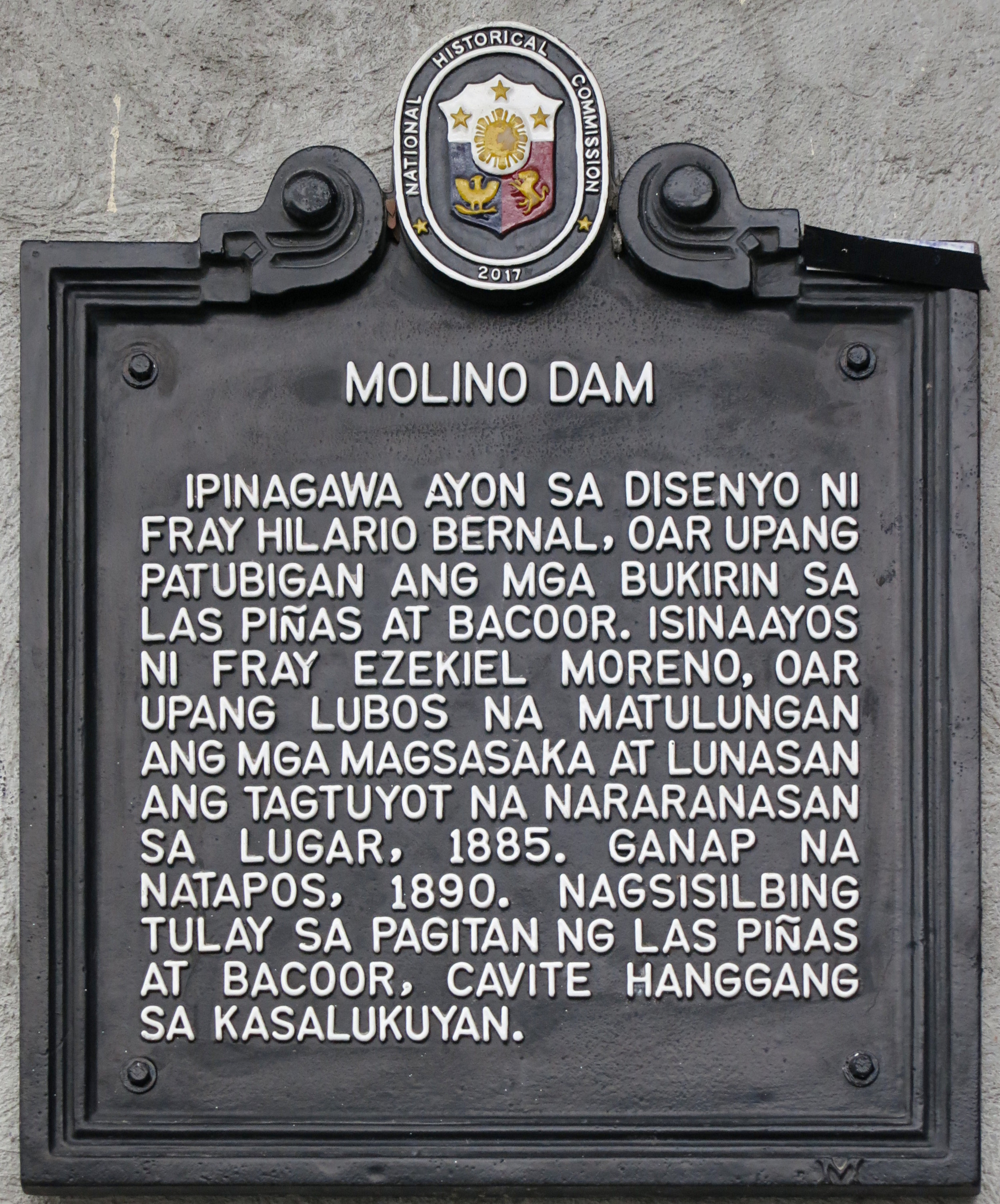
Molino Dam historical marker

=== The Birth of Hacienda de San Nicholas ===
The San Juan de Imus Hacienda was purchased by Don Tomas de Andaya in 1685. The piece of land contiguous to Imus was then sold by Father Jose de Solis, a secular priest, to the Recollects in 1690. The third piece of land was handed down by Doña Hipolita de Zarate y Ozeguera in November 1666 to them, giving rise to Hacienda de San Nicholas.

Father Fidel de Blas, author of oft-quoted Labor evangelica de los Padres Agustinos Recoletos en las Islas Filipinas [Evangelical Labor of the Augustinian Recollect Fathers in the Philippine Islands] confesses the dismal plight of the haciendas:

The haciendas of that period yielded very little, for they were still lands to be tilled and developed. And hardly was there any able work force tapped for their cultivation. Since their produce was not of much import yet, all we could draw from the haciendas was utilized to ameliorate the same, constructing huge water channels, dams in ravines as water depository, and irrigation canals.

=== Construction of irrigation dams ===
From 1780 to 1893, the hacienda administrators built forty-five irrigation dams with tunnels, waterways, and irrigation canals in order to channel available water sources to excellent use, that way securing rice fields during extended drought periods. Father Ezekiel Moreno commenced the repair of Molino Dam in Bacoor, one of the hacienda's most useful dams. His predecessors appropriated considerable sums of money for breaking up untilled lands, putting up mangrove embankments, draining swamps, and building vital road arteries and streets. Also, a total of thirteen stone and brick bridges were constructed at the expense of Saint Nicholas province.

=== Saint Ezekiel Moreno ===
Saint Ezekiel Moreno y Diaz (1848 - 1906) is an Augustinian Recollect whose mission is to serve and solidify his pastoral zeal for the benefit of the people in need. Ordained as priest on June 2, 1871 in Manila, he was given parochial assignments to several towns and provinces in the Philippines including Cavite between September 1882 and April 1885 and Las Piñas between June 1876 and June 1879. He became superior of San Juan Bautista de Imus Priory and administrator of the Recollect haciendas of Bacoor, Imus, and Dasmariñas, Cavite. When the cholera plague ravaged the barrios of Mambog and Salinas in Bacoor, Cavite and several Caviteños were affected in the epidemic, Saint Ezekiel gave the sacrament of the anointing of the sick to 3,197 victims of the cholera.

=== Repair works of Molino Dam ===
One of the pressing problems that have occupied the administrator's attention was the Molino Dam. Father Moreno redacted a letter urging the "need and great convenience of repairing the Molino Dam" especially due to protracted drought periods. The 1885 drought moved the parish curate to request for the rehabilitation of the dam wall answer the need for food of many residents. It would be extremely beneficial for San Nicolas, he reason out, if the walls of the dam were raised higher. The proposed repair aimed to provide more water capacity to the Molino Dam. On April 24, 1885, Provincial Definitorium approved the budget proposal of 3,926.00 pesos and the dam was reconstructed.

== Description ==
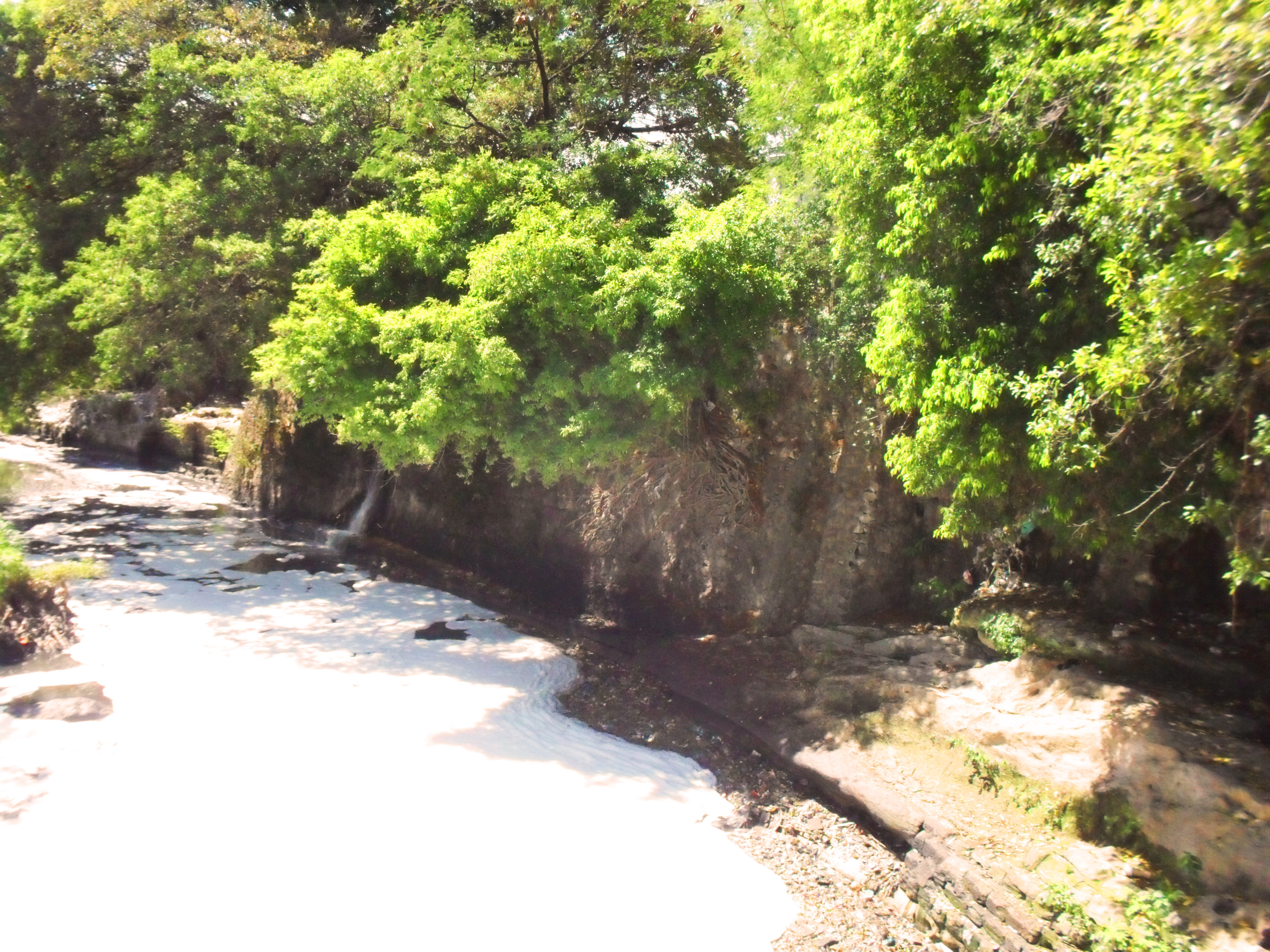
Series of buttresses made out of adobe stones

The Molino Dam is a man-made irrigation dam - its walls made out of adobe (height ranging from 25 to 30 stacks) and some parts of the flooring made out of cobble stones. Series of buttresses support its perimeter walls. Also, the growth of vegetation flourished because of the natural composition of the building materials. Balete trees and bamboo grasses were within the site. They contributed to the enhanced structural integrity of the dam.

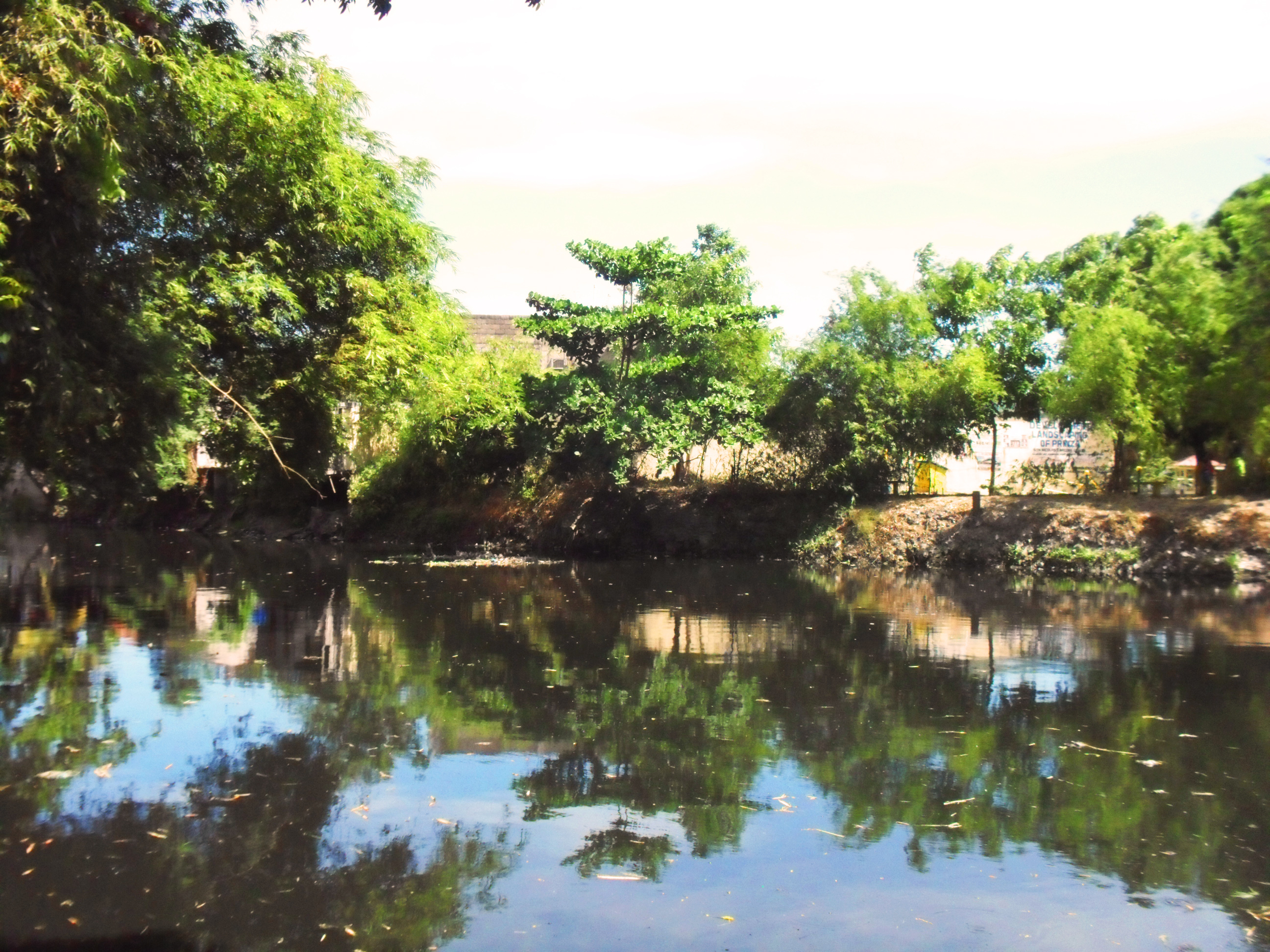
Former medium of freshwater flow in Zapote

The Molino Dam raised the level of water in the upper Zapote River three stories high - the same level as the fields. It also separated the freshwater coming from Almanza and the Molino River from the saltwater of the lower Zapote River. It enabled the irrigation and the rice farming of vast tracts of dry land in Las Piñas and Bacoor. Molino Dam and its attached water distribution system was an outstanding feat of hydrological engineering.

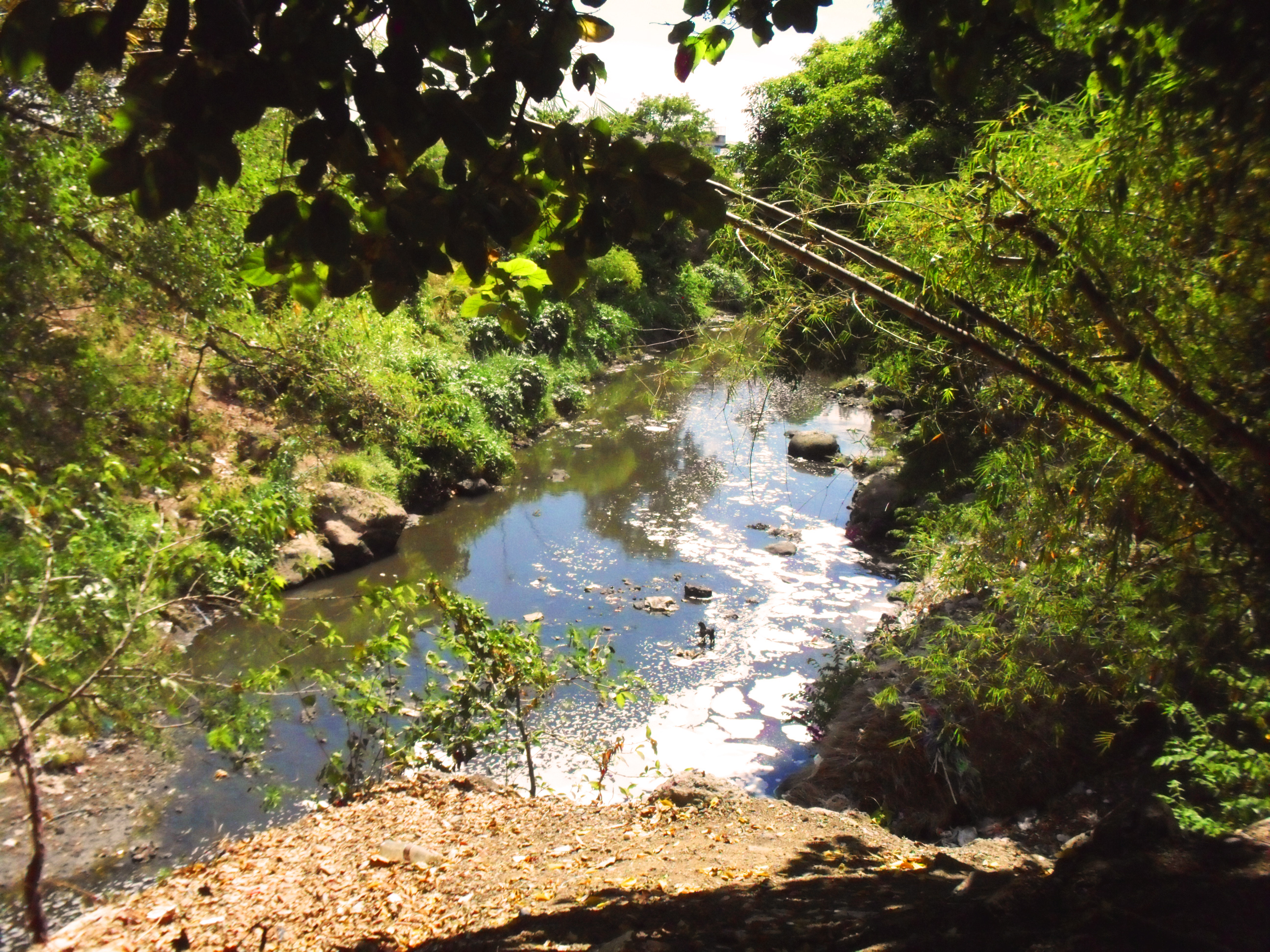
Former medium of saltwater flow in Zapote

== Present situation ==
=== Sagip Ilog ===
From 2002 to 2005, 9,070 residents from various communities along the river system in Las Piñas, Paranaque City and Bacoor, Cavite were trained on ecological solid waste and river management. Some of them were designated river watch volunteers, grouped into 98 teams with 3,576 members. This undertaking has been the commitment of the Couples for Christ-Oikos Ministry volunteers who, since June 2003, have devoted every Saturday conducting values formation and solid waste management education for the Las Piñas residents. They were trained on ecological solid waste management as an important component of the program. Some of them became river watch volunteers.

=== Las Piñas River Station and Livelihood Center ===
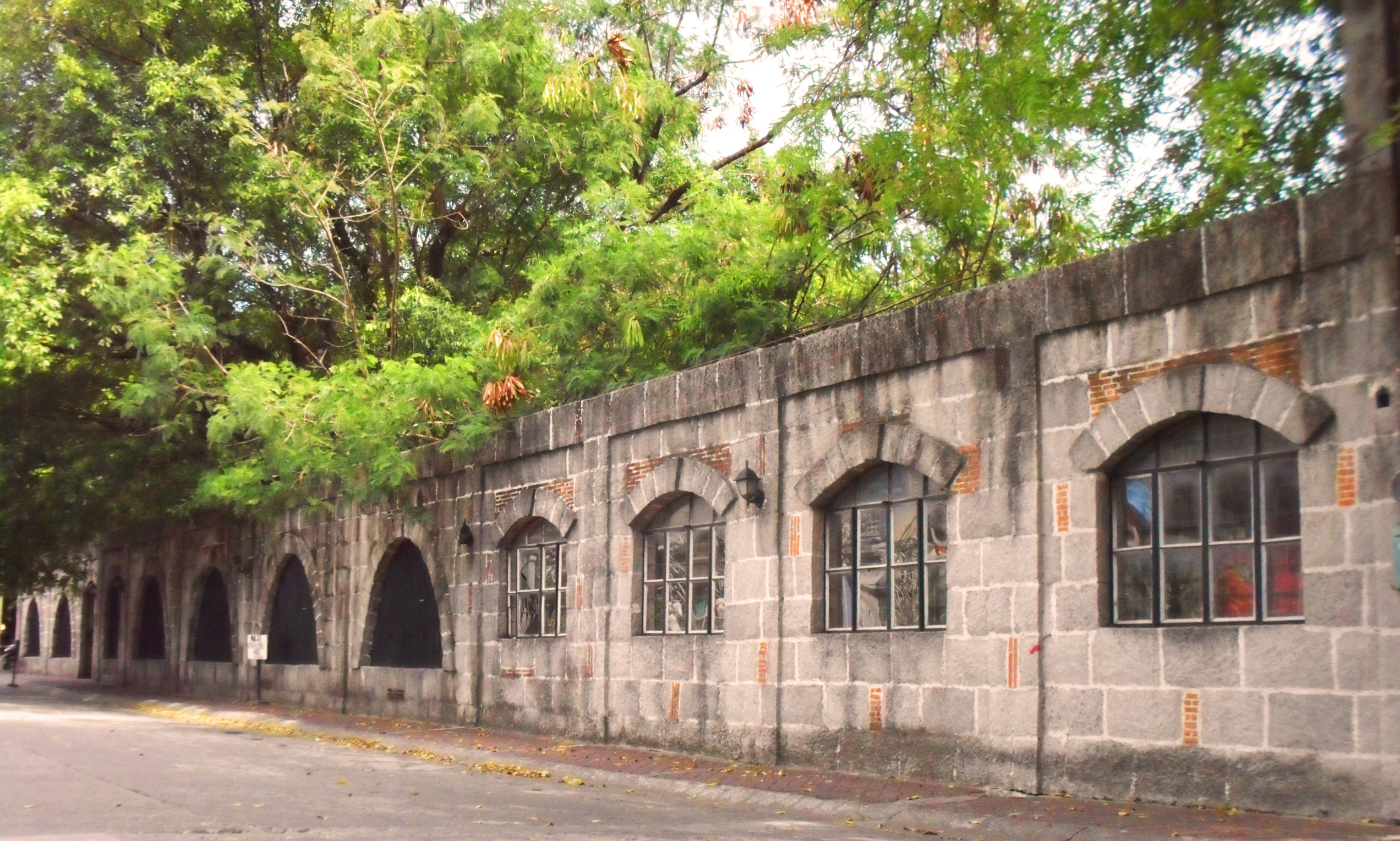
Las Piñas River Station and Livelihood Center

In commemoration of the Molino Dam as a historic testament to the engineering prowess of 18th and 19th century residents of Las Piñas, the Las Piñas River Station and Livelihood Center was inaugurated on July 28, 2006. It is located at BF Resort Village Barangay Talon Dos. It is a project of former Senator Manny Villar and Congresswoman Cynthia Villar; aiming to serve as a recreation area and tourist attraction.

=== Rehabilitation and Restoration of Prinza ===
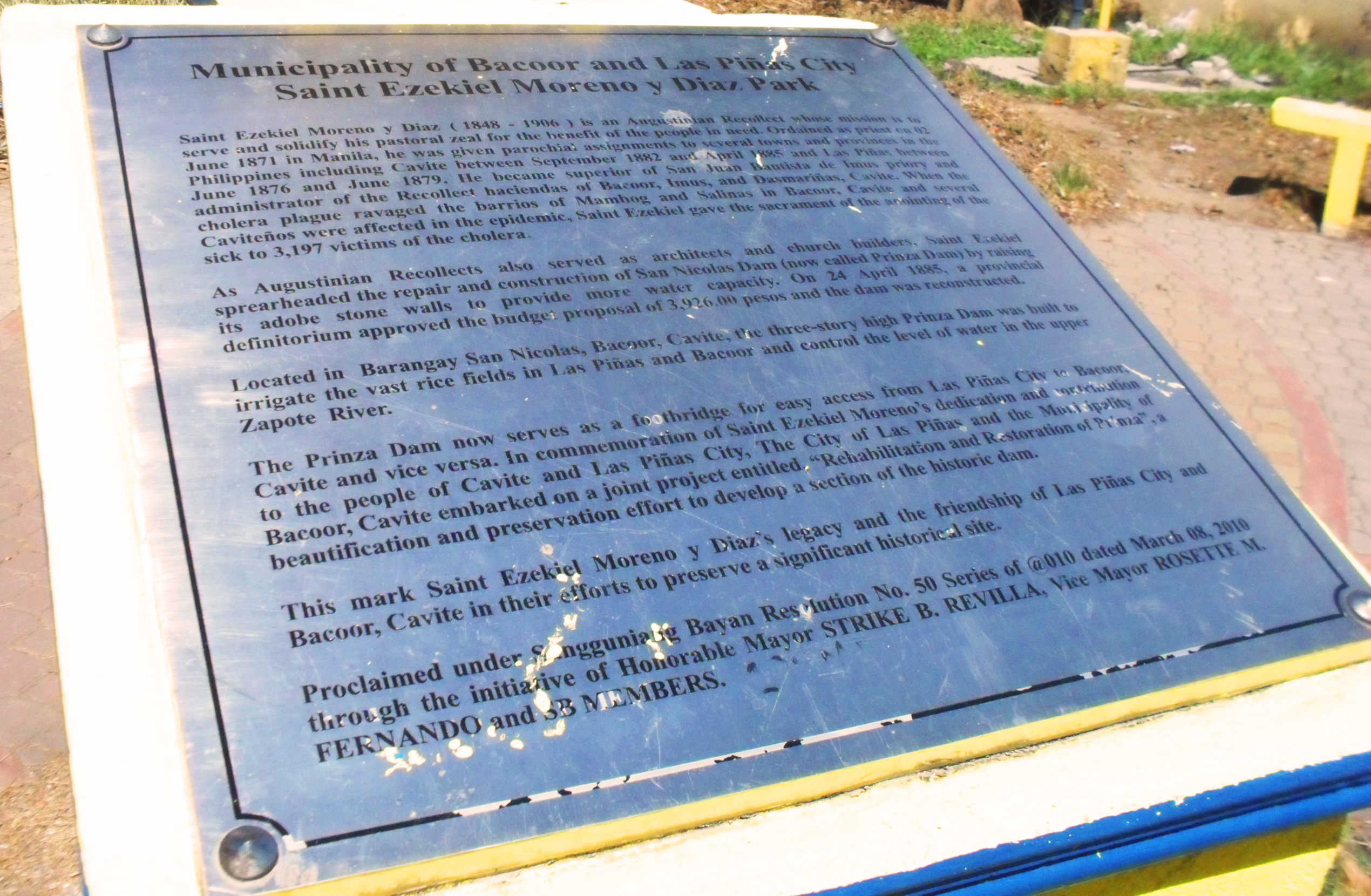
Proclaimed under SB Resolution No. 50

The Molino Dam now serves as a footbridge for easy access from Las Piñas to Bacoor and vice versa. In commemoration of Saint Ezekiel Moreno's dedication and contribution to the people of Cavite and Las Piñas, they embarked on a joint project entitled "Rehabilitation and Restoration of Prinza", a beautification and preservation effort to develop a section of the historic dam.

This mark Saint Ezekiel Moreno y Diaz's legacy and the friendship of Las Piñas and Bacoor, Cavite in their efforts to preserve a significant historical site.

The proclamation of Saint Ezekiel Moreno y Diaz Park was under Sangguniang Bayan Resolution No. 50 s. of 2010, dated March 8, 2010 through the initiative of Mayor Strike Revilla, Vice Mayor Rosette Fernando, and Sangguniang Bayan members.

== Gallery ==
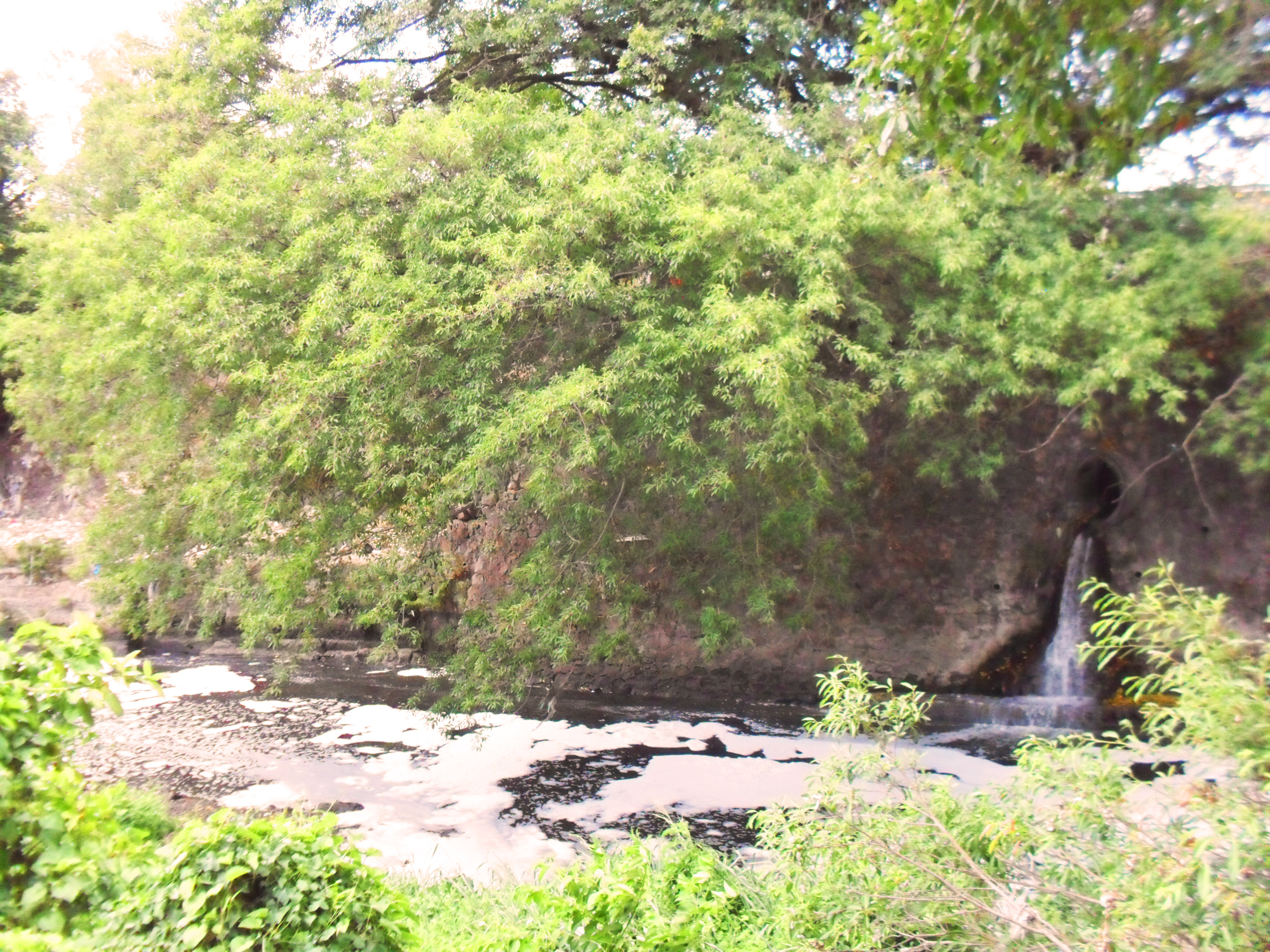
Passageway from Florlina Dela Cruz to Lower Zapote River

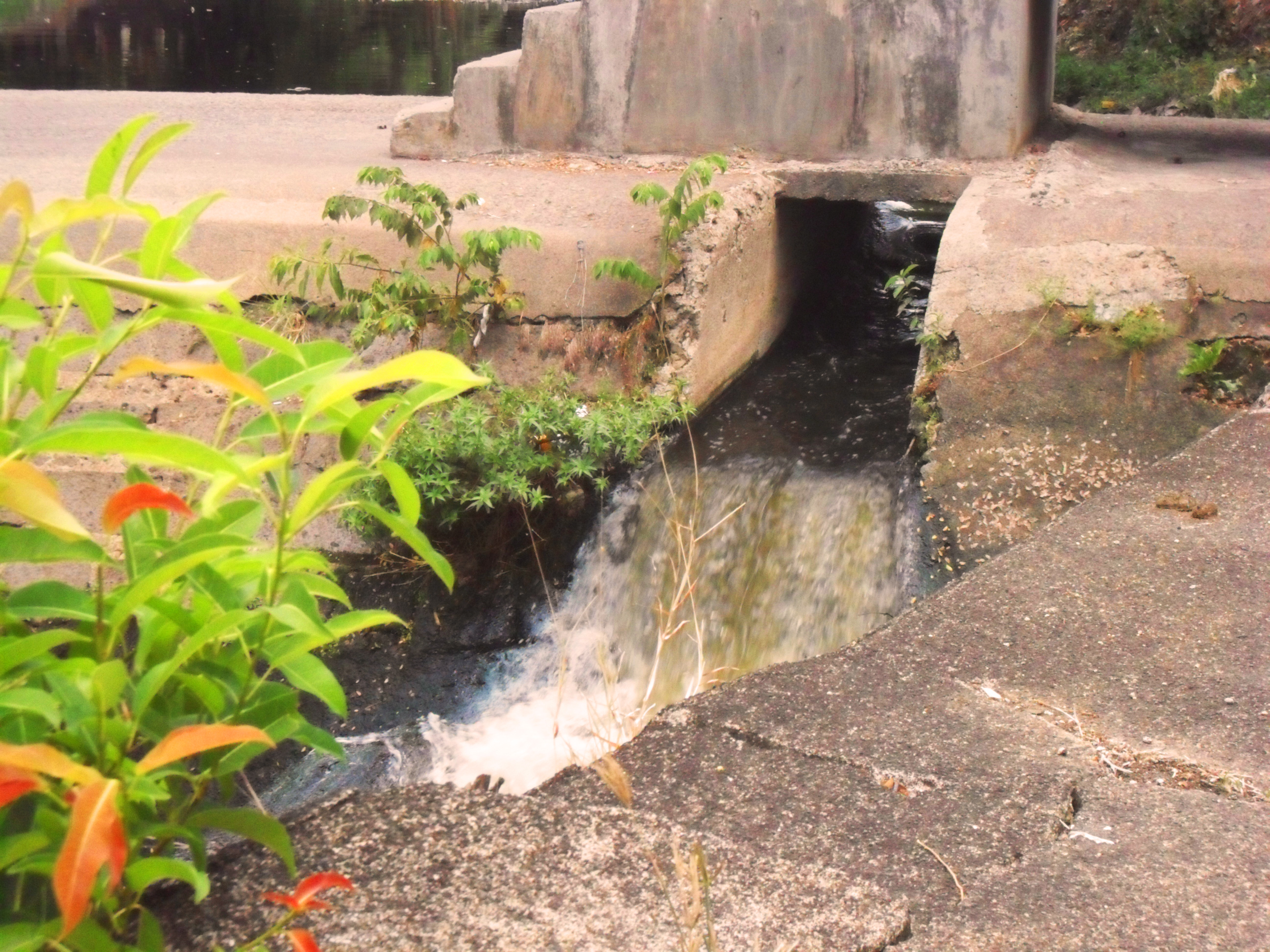
Passageway from Upper to Lower Zapote River

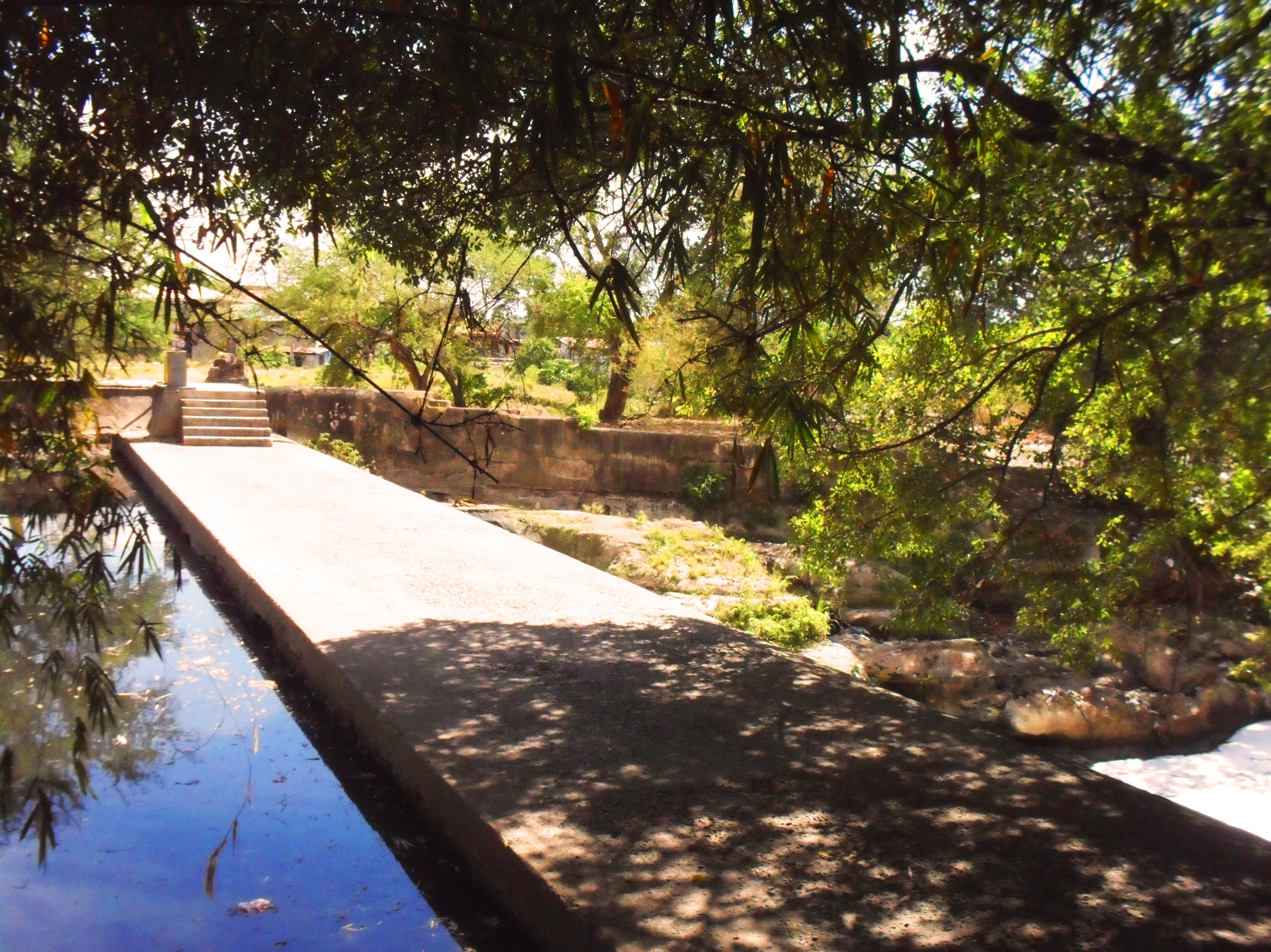
Access connecting Florlina Dela Cruz Street going to Molino Road

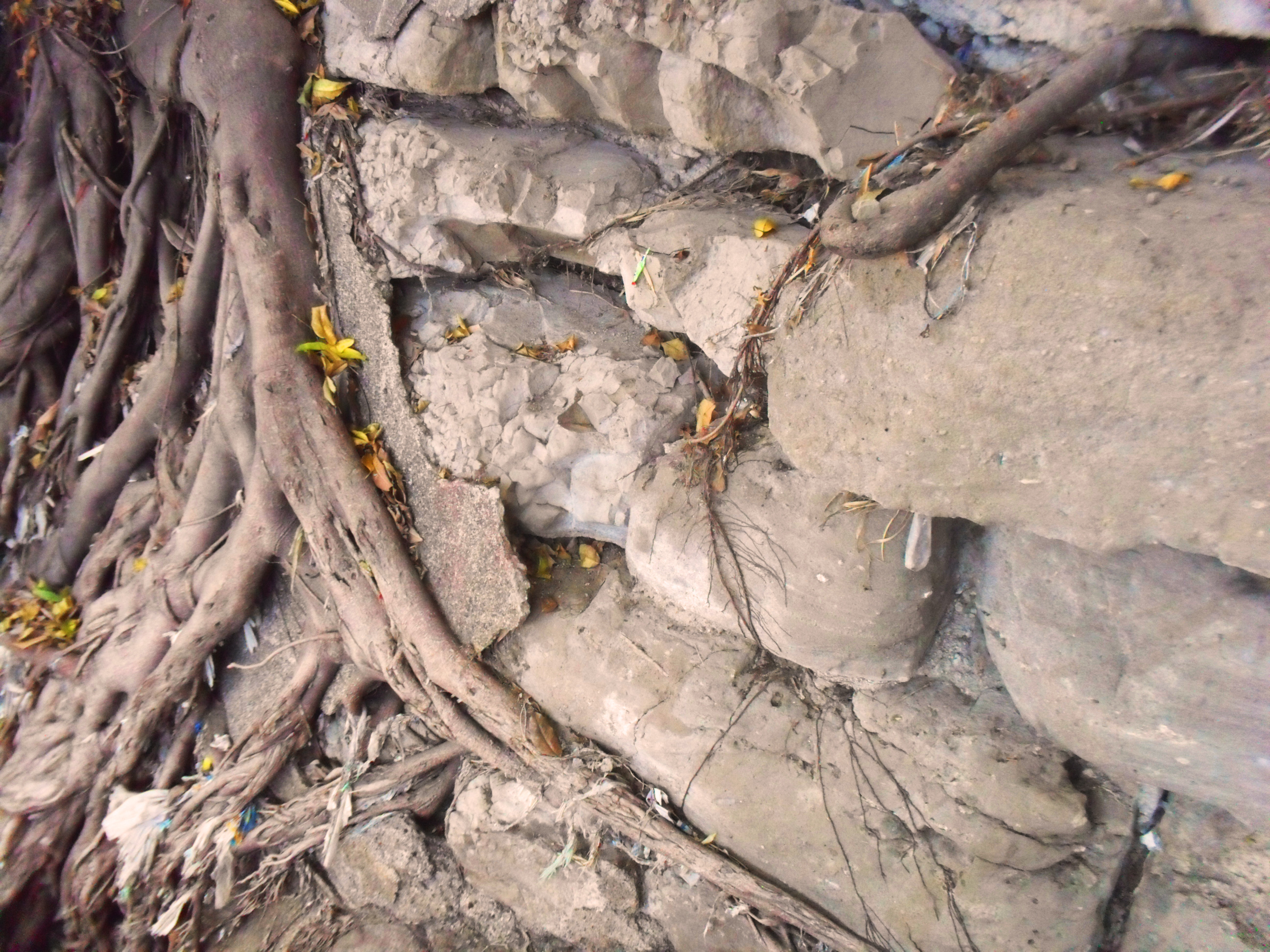
Balete roots among stacks of adobe rocks

== See also ==
- Water supply and sanitation in the Philippines
- Energy in the Philippines
