= Manila Thermal Power Plant =

Decommissioned power plant in Manila, Philippines

Coordinates: 14°35′19″N 120°59′20″E

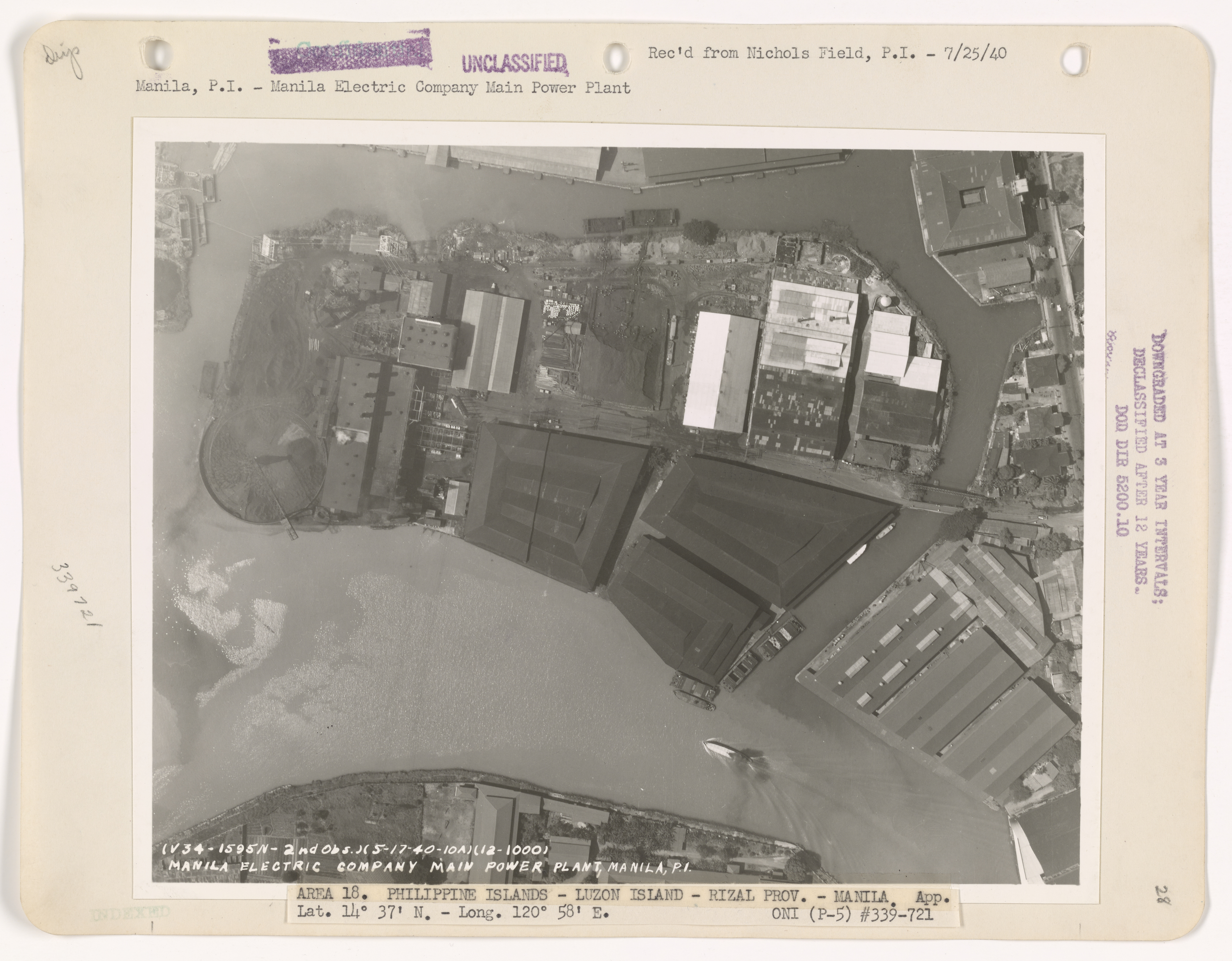
Aerial photo of the power plant taken in 1940

The Manila Thermal Power Plant (MTPP) is a decommissioned power plant found on Isla de Provisor, in the Paco District of Manila, in the Philippines.

Located along the Pasig River, it was sold to the Malaysian firm Gagasan Steel, Inc. by Power Sector Assets and Liabilities Management Corporation (PSALM), an agency of the Philippine government tasked with privatising underperforming power assets.

== History ==
The power plant was composed of two Heavy Oil (bunker C) fired units: Unit One was commissioned on September 1, 1965, and Unit Two was commissioned on October 15, 1966.

Owned by the National Power Corporation, each unit can produce up to 100 megawatts. The power plant substantially contributed to the Luzon Grid until they were both decommissioned in January 2000.

== Auction ==
After decommissioned, MTTP was auctioned off by PSALM, as was the two-hectare plot of land it stands on. The government had been trying to sell its power assets to help boost revenue and encourage private investments in power generation to create a competitive electricity market and eventually lower power costs. PSALM expected MTPP's potential bidders to come from the construction and steel sectors.

On its first try in the first quarter of 2005, the auction failed due to lack of investor interest. A second try, in the last quarter of 2006, similarly failed. On its third attempt in February 2008, the government decided to include the land on which the power plant stood to increase interest; the property is near SM City Manila and other commercial centers. However, it failed again since South Korea-based JC Ethanol and Metal Trading Corp. offered a price lower than what the government was willing to accept. Malaysia's Gagasan Steel did not meet technical requirements, and was thus disqualified from the bidding.

In April 2008, PSALM entered into negotiated bid and completed negotiations with Gagasan Steel to acquire MTPP for US$2.5 million. The auction did not include the underlying land because foreign entities are legally banned from owning land in the Philippines. PSALM issued Gagasan the notice of award and certificate of effectivity after the Malaysian firm gave PSALM a performance bond of US$1.253 million. Gagasan will be responsible for the dismantling of the facilities and site clean-up, for six months subject to extension.
