= Pasig Rainforest Park =

Public park in the Philippines

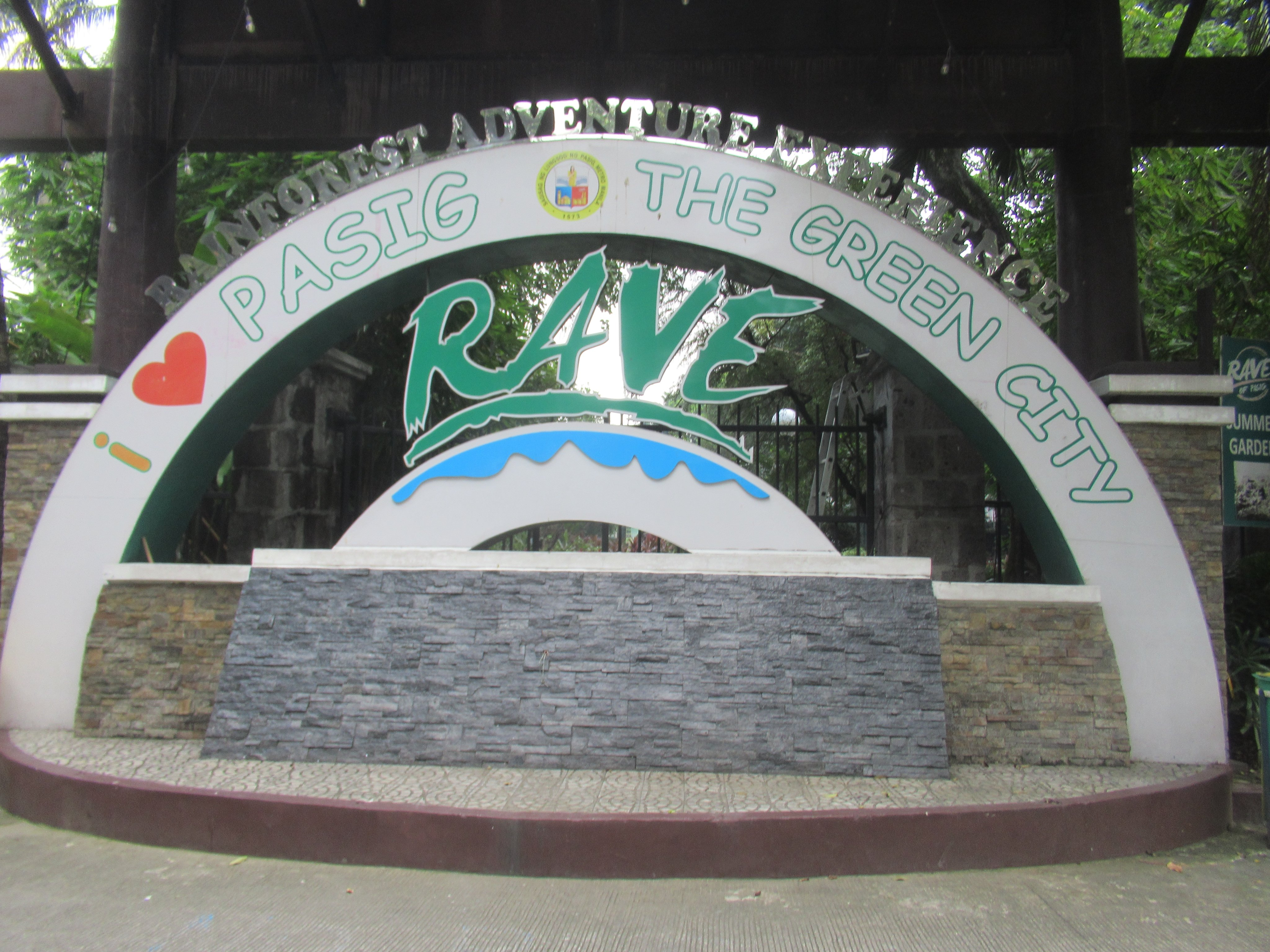
- RAVE Entrance
- Interactive map of Pasig Rainforest Park
- Type: Nature park
- Location: Pasig, Philippines
- Coordinates: 14.573839°N 121.097662°E
- Area: 8 hectares (20 acres)
- Created: 1977
- Operator: City Environment and Natural Resources Office (CENRO); City Government of Pasig
- Status: Opened
- Website: RAVE Rainforest Park

Pasig Rainforest Park, also known as Pasig City Rainforest Adventure Experience (RAVE Rainforest Park) and Pasig Central Park, is a public park in Pasig, eastern Metro Manila, Philippines. It spans 8 hectares (20 acres), and is a mixed recreational and natural park with a mini-zoo. The rainforest park was opened to the public in 1977 with an initial area of 4.8 hectares (12 acres). It had an Olympic-sized swimming pool, jogging oval, children's playground, tennis courts and a fitness center. In 1996, the park was enlarged with the acquisition of an additional 2.1 hectares (5.2 acres). The park was relaunched as the Rainforest Adventure Experience (RAVE) in 2013 with the completion of the boating lagoon, zip line, obstacle course and a skatepark.

The Park which is a sanctuary of 3,000 different types of trees, was declared a "Protected area" and renamed "Maybunga Rainforest Park" by Pasig Ordinance No. 6, Section 2023, January, chief executive officer Patrick Plandiano said. The Department of Environment and Natural Resources declared its 80-year-old Balete tree a Heritage tree.

On October 12, 2023, Mayor Vico Sotto unveiled the renovated Maybunga park with the completion of various attractions such as the waterpark, wall climbing facility, botanical garden, mini zoo, butterfly pavilion, fitness center, spa, picnic area and camping site.

In July 2024, Mayor Vico Sotto and the Department of Environment and Natural Resources led the declaration ceremony, including the installation of a historical marker on the 70 year old Balete tree as the 4th heritage tree in PRP, Maybunga, Pasig.

== Description ==
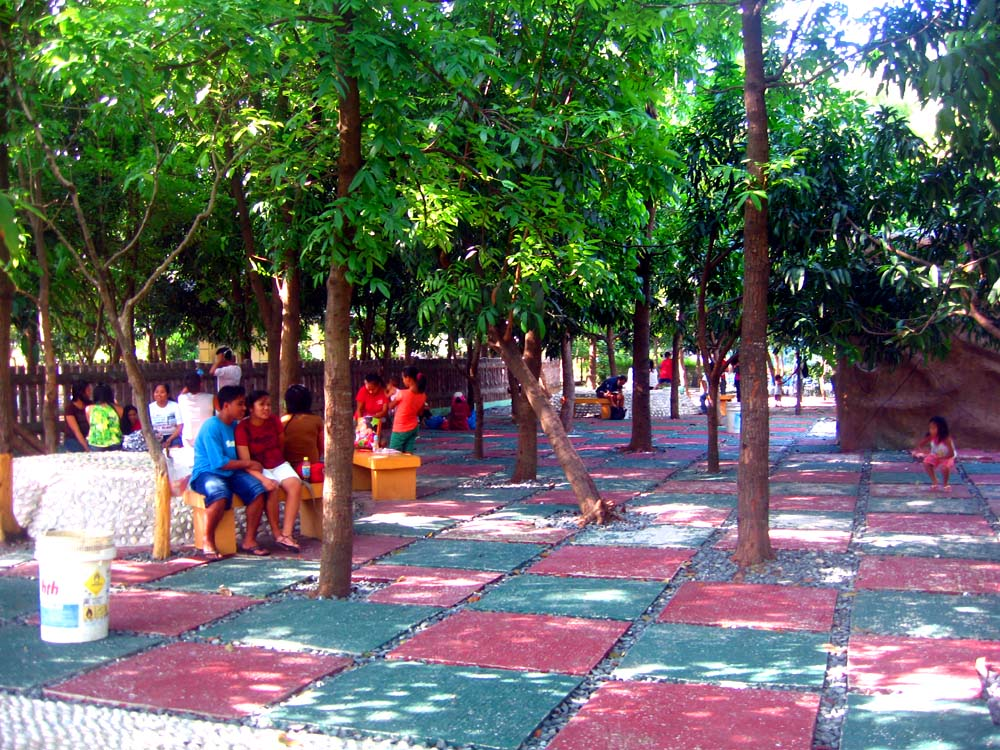
Inside the Kids Activity Area

Pasig Rainforest Park is located in the village of Maybunga. It stretches along Francisco Legaspi Street and is bordered by Summerfield Residences to the west, the village of San Miguel to the south, and West Bank Road to the east, close to Manggahan Floodway and Pasig's border with the municipality of Taytay, Rizal.

The park's main feature is the Water Park which consists of two adult swimming pools, two pools for kids and a mini-Olympic-sized swimming pool. It also features rapids and water slides, as well as cottages and picnic tables. The Adventure Park is where visitors can try rappelling and wall climbing. It also contains a skate park, obstacle courses and the tallest and longest zip line in Metro Manila at 18 metres (59 ft) high and 200 metres (660 ft) long. The Pasig Zoo is another major attraction in the park which contains an aviary, a vivarium and a petting zoo that houses ostriches, crocodiles and monkeys.

Pasig Rainforest Park's other attractions include a man-made lagoon for boating activities, a botanical garden which features a flower park and a butterfly pavilion, a maze garden, and a full-sized amphitheater. A train takes visitors to these areas around the park. Near the park's entrance on F. Legaspi Street is the Promenade Area which houses a function hall for private events such as weddings and debuts in the elevated pavilion. The park also has tennis and badminton courts, a camping area, children's activity area, garden for senior citizens, and a modern public gym.

The Pasig City Science High School is located inside the park. It is also within walking distance from the Rizal Technological University Maybunga Campus and Pasig City General Hospital. The park is accessible from Rosario, Ugong and Ortigas Center via Ortigas Avenue and Raymundo Avenue or West Bank (Manggahan) Road, and from Bagong Ilong and Bonifacio Global City via Circumferential Road 5 (Eulogio Rodriguez Jr. Avenue) and Pasig Boulevard Extension to Raymundo Avenue.

== Gallery ==
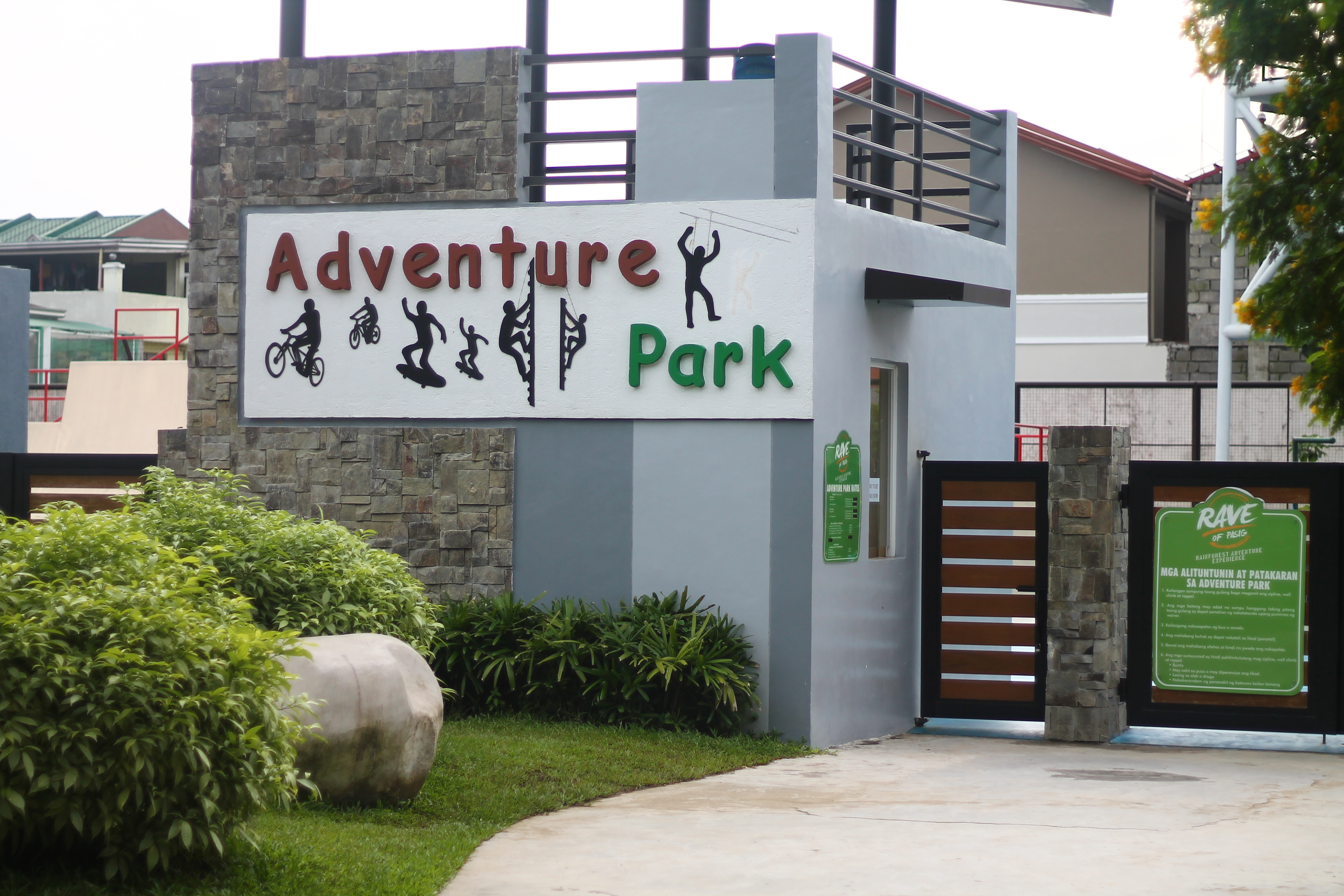
Entrance to Adventure Park

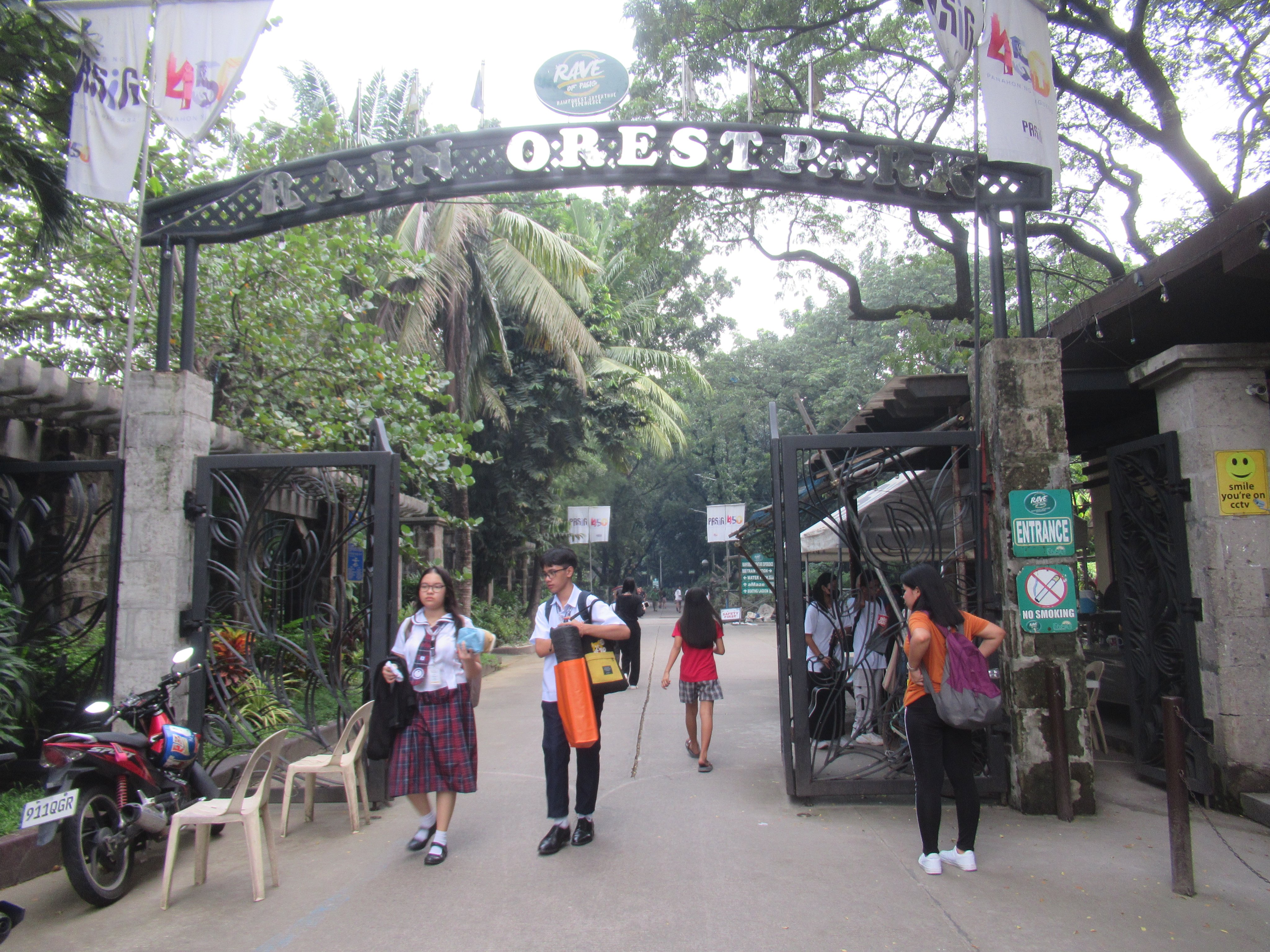
Main gate

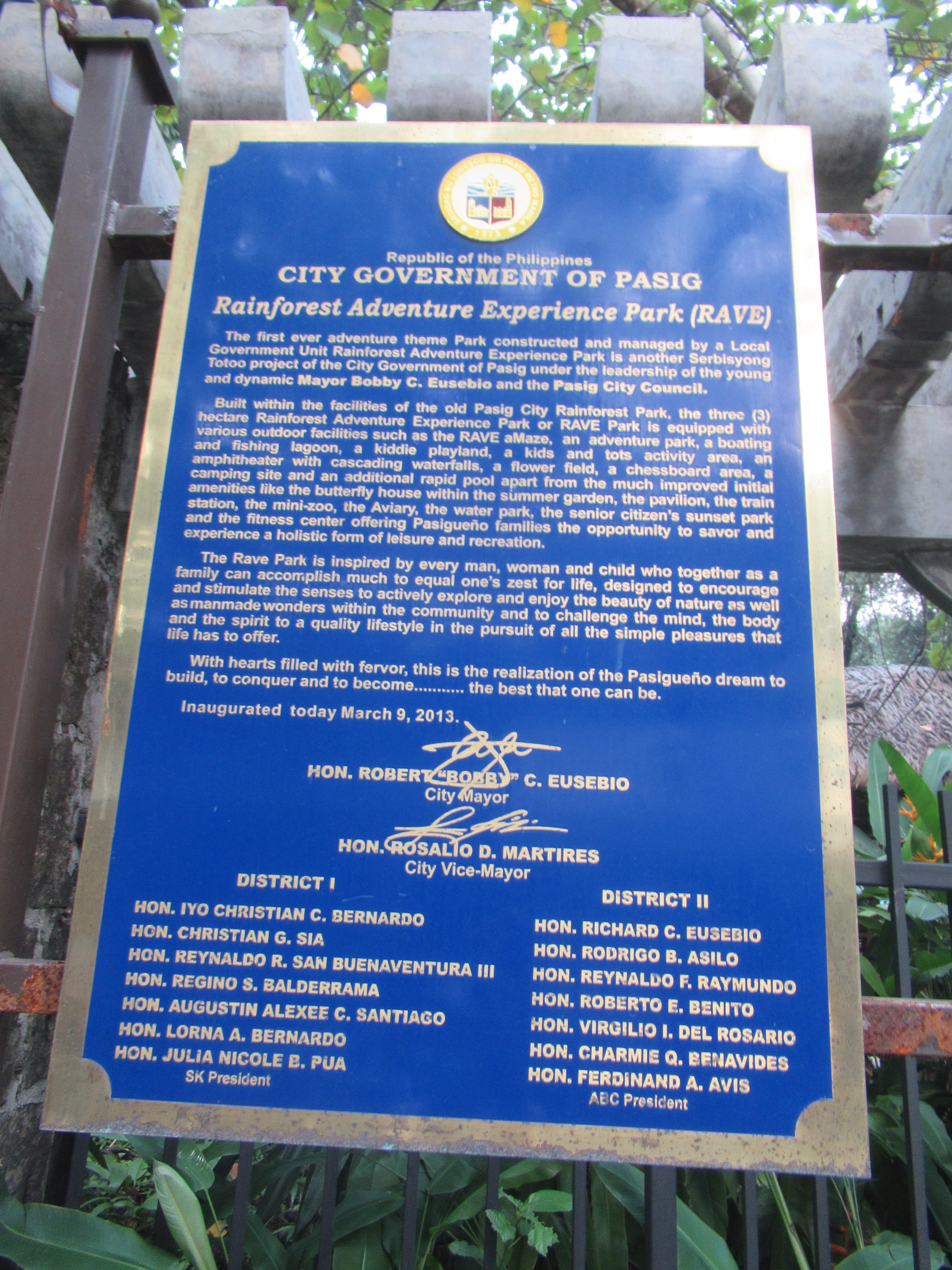
Historical marker

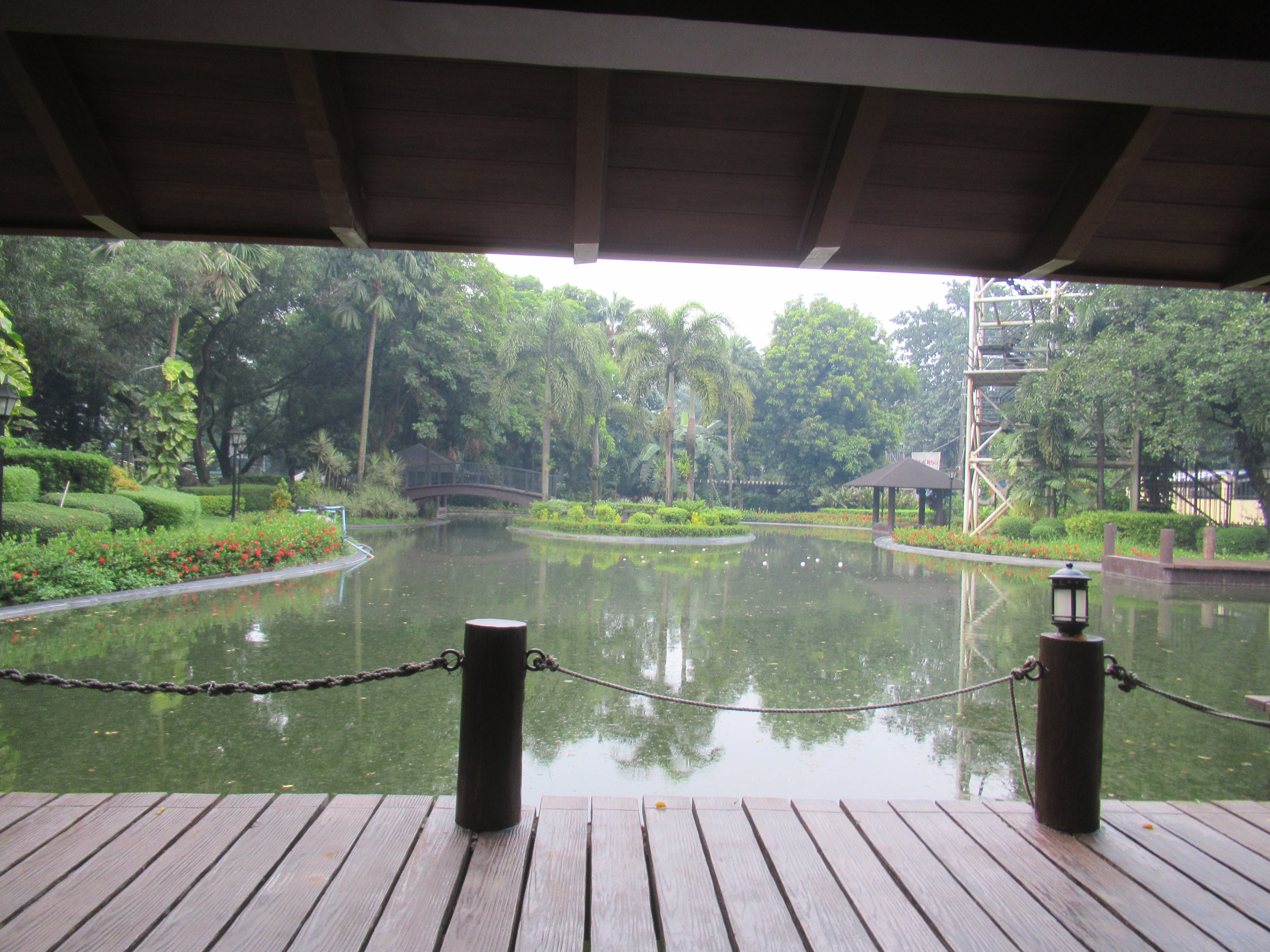
Boating lagoon

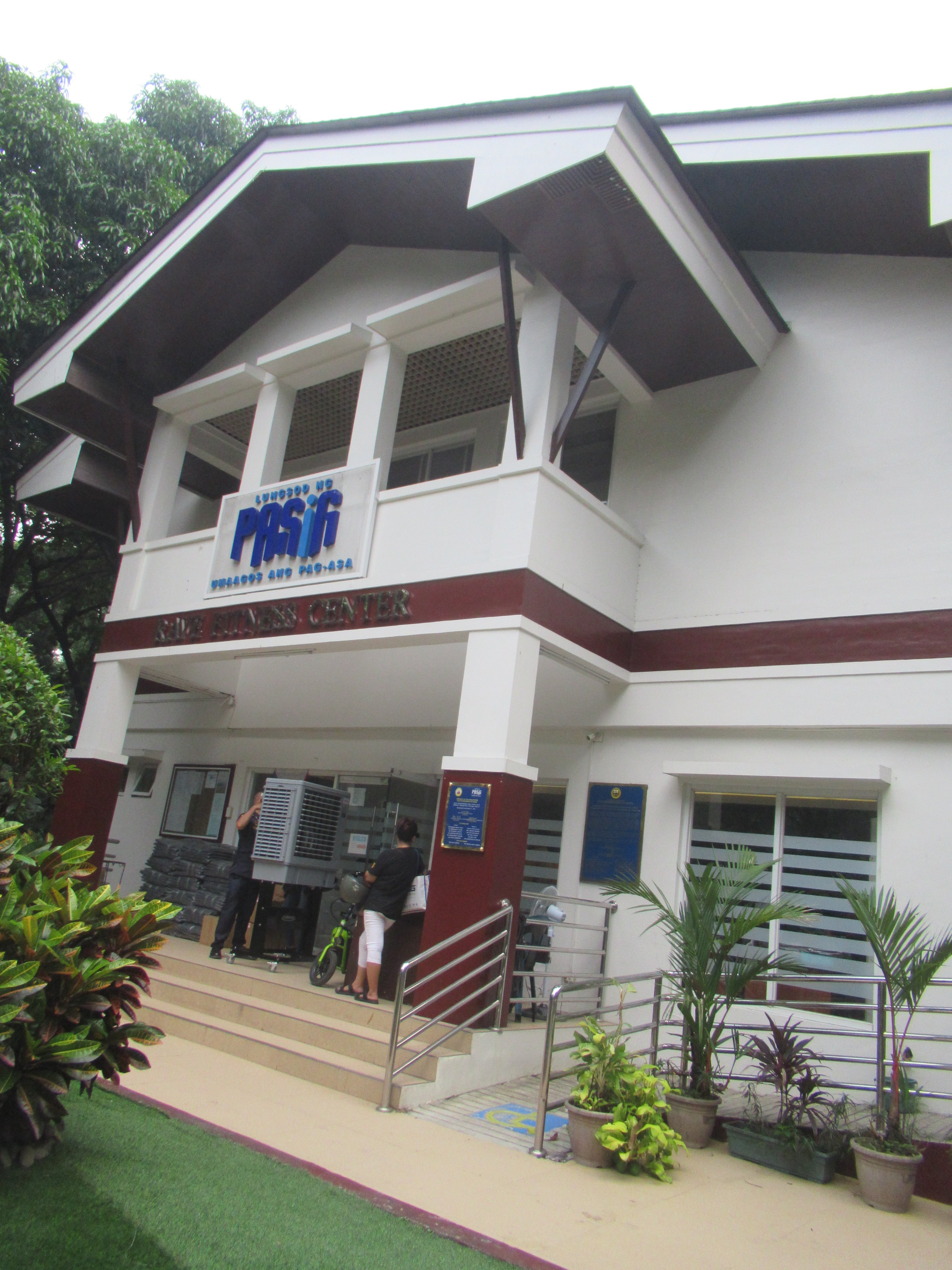
Fitness center

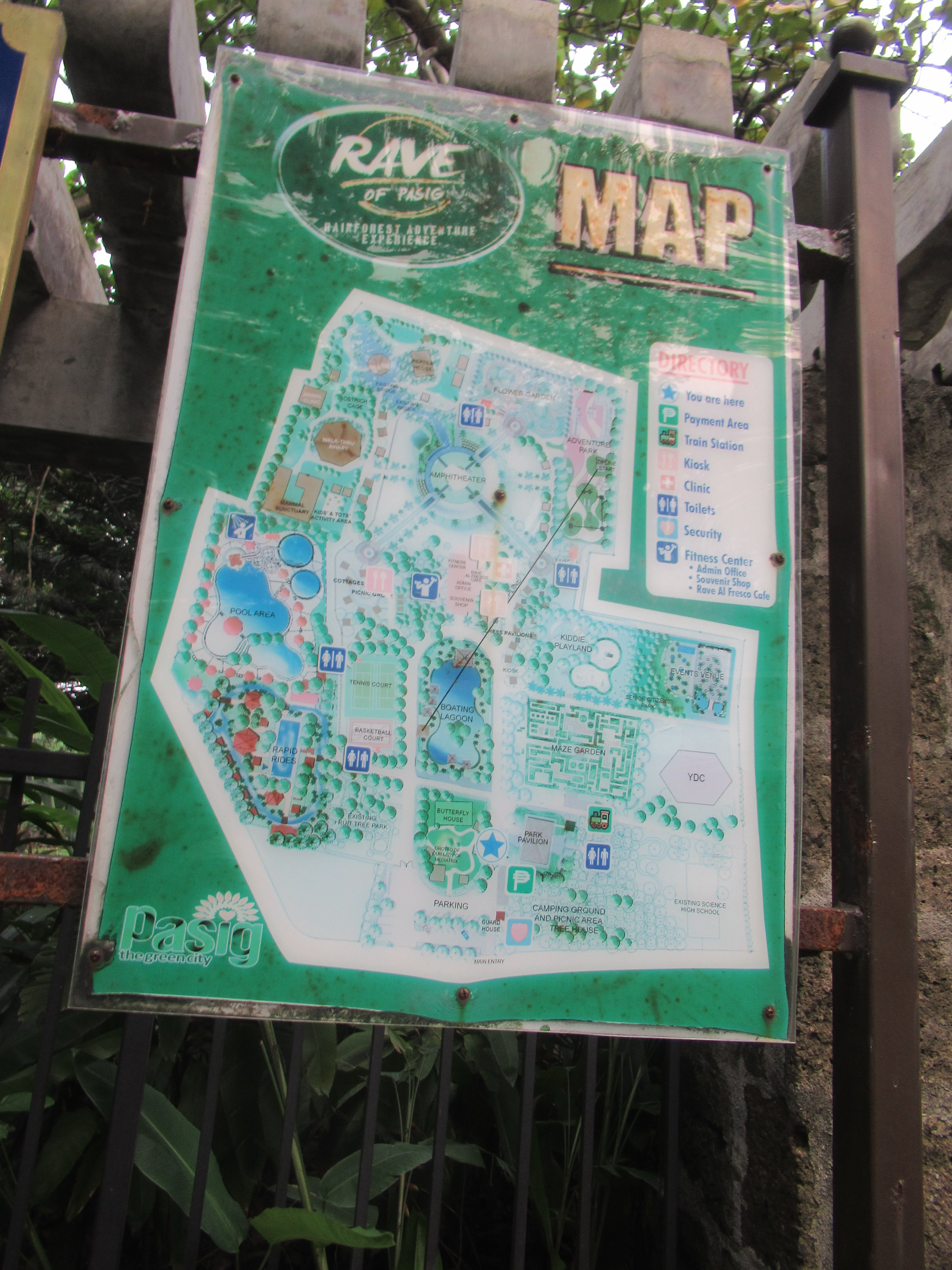
Map

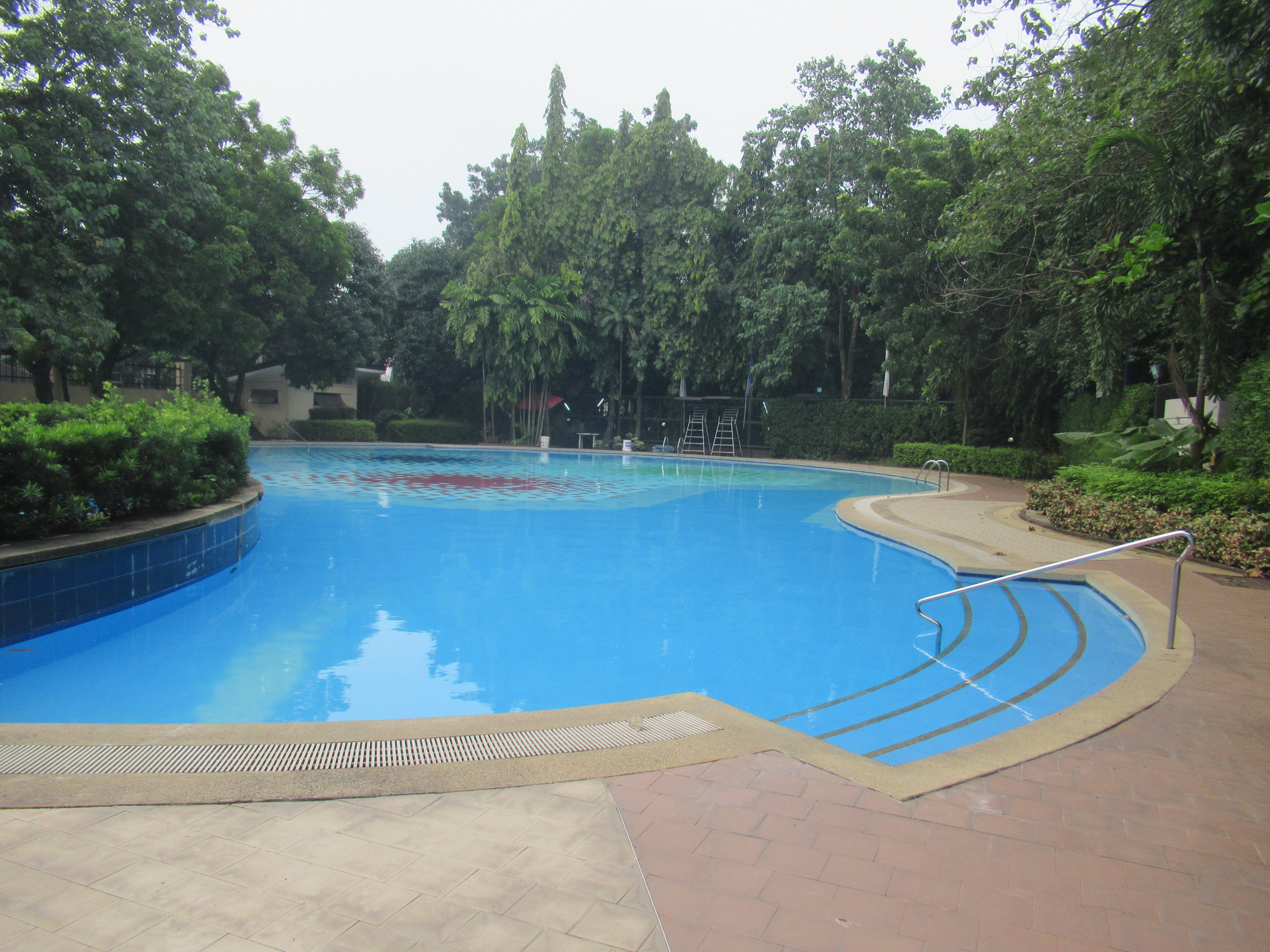
Olympic-sized swimming pool

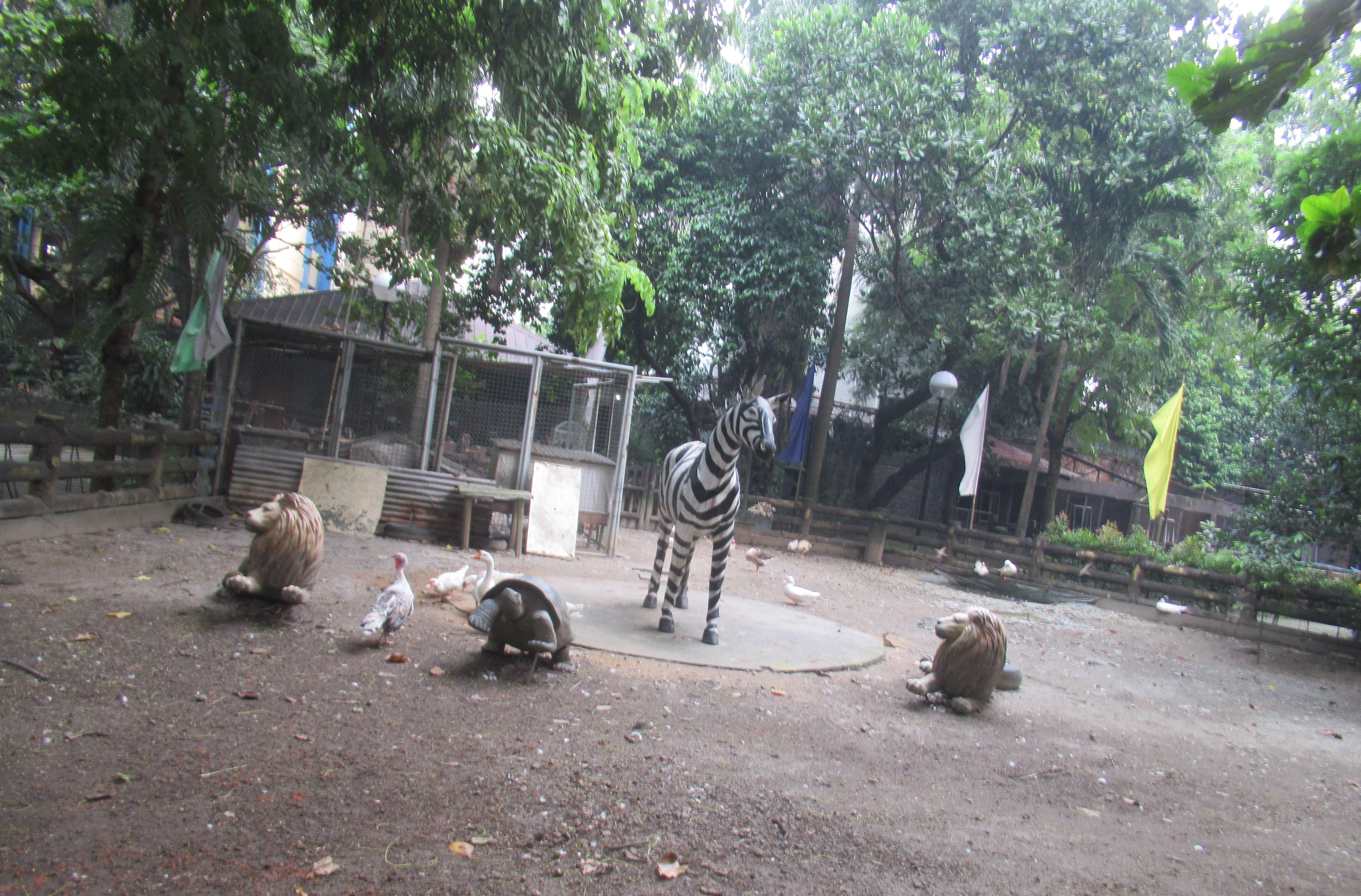
Mini zoo

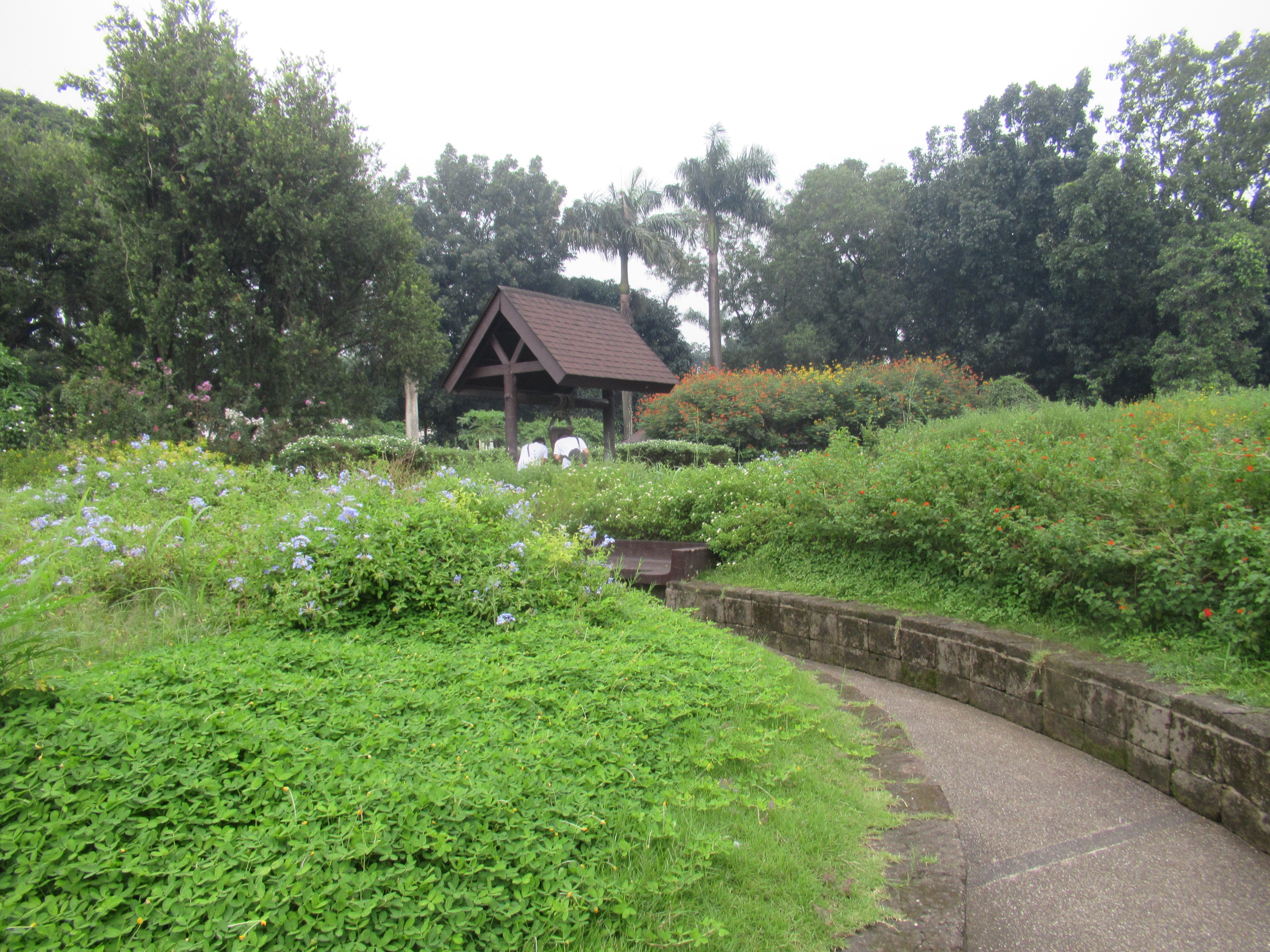
Botanical garden
