= Metropolitan mountaineering society =

Metropolitan Mountaineering Society (or MMS) is a mountaineering/outdoor recreation organization in the Philippines. Based in Manila, the group intends to educate its members in protecting the environment by promoting responsible mountaineering and other outdoor related activities. The organization was founded in 1994 and currently has around 200 members in and around Metro Manila.

== History ==
The group started out through the efforts of Denis Sacro. He initiated its organization through advertisements from free ads publications. During the same year, the initial policies of the organization were established. The first official climb which is now considered the foundation day of the organization happened on March 13 of the same year at Mt. Makiling, attended by now considered the eight founding members Dennis, Long, Ed, Jerick, Boying Amio, Richard Kahulugan, Joey Avila and Anne De Leon (now Anne Sacro).
