= Aserradora Mecánica de Tuason y Sampedro =

Mechanical sawmill in the Philippines

The first full-time mechanical sawmill in the Philippines, the Ascerradura de Mecanica, was opened in the 1880s by Tuason and Sampedro in Gunao Street in Quiapo, a heavily mestizo section of Manila.

== History of Manila Timber Trade ==
Manila has been a prime city in the 17th century due to Manila Galleon; thus, it increased in size and importance because Manila became the main port for Philippine commodity export economy. Several establishments such as foreign trading houses, cigar manufacturing, shipping centers, as well as the colonial government and the Catholic Church were centered at Manila. Due to the increasing activity, it also increased the demand for new construction; thus, creating an urban lumber market. Manila became the ultimate destination for wood. Timber became a commodity - firewood for cooking and source of fuel, fine woods such as narra and baticulin for furniture and woodworking, solid woods like molave for ship and house framing, and yakal and ipil for construction.

=== Top Six Leading Provinces Sending Timber to Manila: 1864, 1872, 1875, and 1881 ===
1864	1872	1875	1881
290 Shipments; 15 Provinces	120 Shipments; 8 Provinces	206 Shipments; 9 Provinces	304 Shipments; 13 Provinces
Tayabas - 84	Tayabas - 65	Tayabas - 84	Tayabas - 113
Mindoro - 57	Mindoro - 28	Mindoro - 61	Mindoro - 68
Masbate - 41	Marinduque - 12	Romblon - 17	Romblon - 27
Romblon - 35	Batangas - 8	Marinduque - 14	Marinduque - 25
Zambales - 29	Zambales - 3	Masbate - 11	Masbate - 20
Batangas - 14	Masbate - 2	Bataan - 7	Zambales - 16
Reference: Gaceta de Manila 1864; El Comercio 1872, 1875, and 1881.

=== Hierarchy ===
The Market in 1864 basically involves 3 kinds of individuals - captain, or arraez, sellers, and the buyers (mostly Spaniards and building contractors). The process of log arrival in the port of Manila are as follows: Few ships arrive with full cargo of timber. Instead, ships came from provinces with partial cargo of timber, along with other commodities. The captains, or arraez enter the port without making prior arrangements on the potential sellers (to the buyers, Spaniards). They would wait for almost 3–4 weeks before returning. In the end, some arraez performed the roles of both supplier of goods and sellers at the same time. The patrons of the timber products include building contractors and some Spaniards, who were also merchants - using timber for their own construction projects.

==== Top Six Timber Merchants, 1864 and 1881 ====
Rank	1864 - Name and Shipments	1881 - Name and Shipments
First	Don Manuel Callejas - 20	J. Duyanding - 35
Second	Don Jose Baza - 8	P. Valenzuela - 24
Third	Don Cayetano Miguel - 8	J. Borromeo - 23
Fourth	Don Jose Rodriguez - 8	C. Valenzuela - 20
Fifth	Don Clemente Alcantara - 6	E. Jose - 16
Sixth	Don Geronimo Ramos - 6	M. Bertoluci - 15
Reference: Gaceta de Manila 1864; El Comercio 1881.

=== Sawmills ===
By the time of the 1903 census, there were said to be fourteen sawmills "recently set up" in the Philippines utilizing steam or waterpower, eight of these in Manila alone. Thirty-three small hand-sawing establishments were also reported to be in operation. Also, Manila had 18 furniture makers, 4 wood carving establishments, 10 carpentry businesses, and 6 ship builders. By 1920, 14 timber concessions and 40 sawmills were operational countrywide.

=== Evolution of Philippine architecture ===
New design of buildings followed after the 1863 earthquake. The new plans relied more heavily on wood than before because it was less prone than stone to collapse during an earthquake. Fernando Zialcita and Martin Tiñio, describing the evolution of Philippine architecture from 1810 to 1930, note that 1863 marked a shift from heavy stone foundations to a lighter mortar framed by wooden "stiffeners" in the walls. The new design was more flexible and required more timber for building materials.

== History of Aserradora Mecanica de Tuason y Sampedro ==
=== Founder ===
==== Don Mariano Severo Tuason ====
Aserradora Mecanica de Tuason y Sampedro was founded by Don José Severo Tuason and Don Miguel García Sampedro in 1880. Don Mariano Severo Tuason was the great-great-grandson of the late Son Tua (later became Don Antonio Tuason). Don Antonio Tuason was considered as one of the most prominent Filipino during the 18th century. He helped the Spanish Governor General Simon de Anda by organizing 1500 Chinese mestizos to strengthen the Spanish government against British Occupation. In return, the Spanish Governor-General exempted him to pay tributes for two generations in 1775. He was also encouraged to hispanized his name, from Son-Tua to Tua-Son.

=== Paulino Miranda Sampedro ===
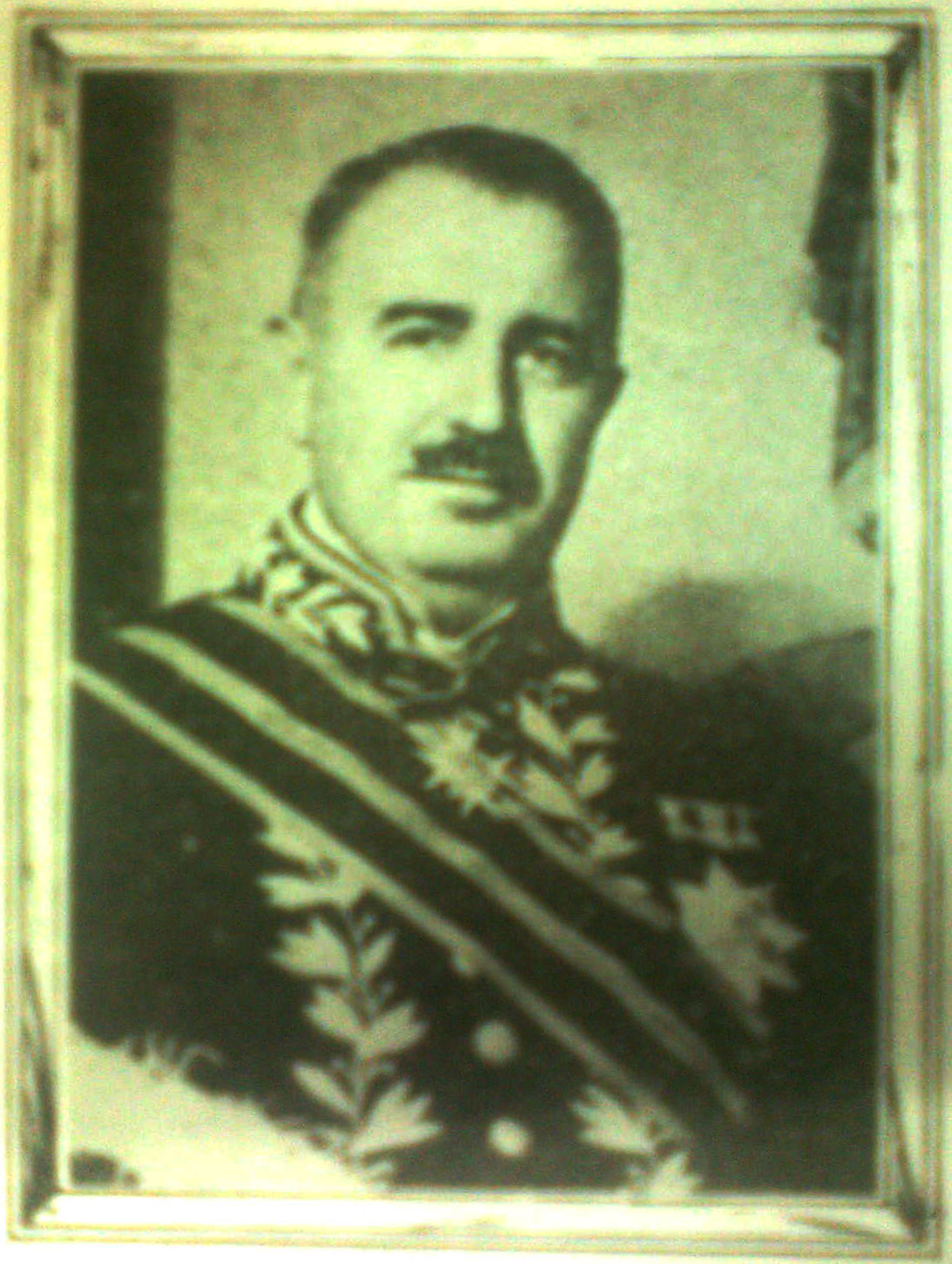
One of the presidents and general manager of Tuason and Sampedro, Inc.

One of the most successful foreign businessmen in the Philippines was Mr. Paulino Miranda Sampedro.

Mr. Paulino Miranda Sampedro was born on June 18, 1897, in Quiros, Asturias, Spain. He was married to Maria Lourdes de Moreta y Puyol and had nine children, namely: Paulino, Jaime, Maria dela Asuncion, Carlos, Alfredo, Maria Elena, Mario Cesar, Maria Lourdes and Juan Antonio. Mr. Sampedro was a graduate of commerce from the Polytechnic Institute of Sevilla. He served as professor in commerce in the Academy of Commercial Practice of Mr. Jose Menendez, Director of the Bank in Oviedo, Spain.

Mr. Paulino Sampedro was 18 years old when he started working as director-treasurer of the firm Rubin Sons, Importers and Lumber Concessionaires in Oviedo, Spain. In 1926, he became director-editor of the Covadonga Review and Knight of St. Silvestre in 1929. In 1930, he was made president of the conference of St. Vincent of Paul. At the same time he founded the Society of Soft Drink Makers and has been its president for thirty-one years. In 1934 he was appointed commissioner commercial delegate for the Philippine government in China for Philippine products and became the president of the Society of Papal or Pontifical Knights in the Philippines three years after. It was in 1937 when Mr. Sampedro founded the Spanish Juvenile Organization in the Philippines and became its delegate since then. He was co-founder, treasurer and adviser of the Social Auxiliary and founder and director of the Students Savings Box which were founded in 1938 and 1939, respectively. It was at that time when he became vice-president of the Hospital Español of Santiago and Philippine delegate of the international convention of the American soft drink companies in San Francisco, California. In 1940 he organized the Spanish-Filipino Pavilion in the Farmer and Labor Jubilee Exposition.

On October 15, 1942, he was appointed as a director of the Settlement House of St. Joseph and director of the Spanish Chamber of Commerce in the Philippines on Feb. 15, 1943. In April, 1947 he was made representative consul of Ecuador. A year later, in 1948, he was honorary vice-consul of the Republic of Costa Rica; Major knight commander of the Order of St. Gregory the Great; Knight Magistral Grace of the S.O.M. of Maita; Grand Cross of the Order of St. Silvestre and knight commander with place of Isabel, the Catholic.

Mr. Sampedro's activities extend far beyond his being distinguished member of the Bene-meritus of the Missionary Association of the Military Order of Malta in 1949; knight of Grand-Cross and official delegate of the Sovereign Military Order of Malta in the Philippines, and titular member of the Spanish-Cultural Institute in Madrid in 1950 and 1951, respectively.

On April 23, 1950, he was an official delegate of the Philippine Chamber of Commerce in the World Congress of Chamber of Commerce held in Rome. In 1953, he organized the Hispano-Filipino Block, "Generalisimo Franco" and again was appointed official delegate of the Philippine Chamber of Commerce for the economic cooperation, to the Congress of the Ibero-American and Philippines held in Madrid and Barcelona. A year after, he organized the Hispano-Filipino Bank and initiated and authored the Spanish-Castle in 1956. It was also in 1956 when he became merit-collaborator of the Doctor's Academy in Madrid.

He was the President and General Manager of the following businesses:

- Tuason and Sampedro, Inc.
- Cagayan Sawmill, Inc.
- Isabela Lumber Company
- Halcon Lumber Co.
- Malabon Net Factory
- Hercules Floorwax and Cleanser Factory in Las Pinas, Rizal
- Tagaytag Refreshment and Gasoline Station
- Hercules Button Factory and Chicken Feed Mfg.

=== Location ===
Parcel 2 (lot No. 2, plan 11-13272) - On the N. by lot No. 1; on the E. by Estero de Quiapo; on the S. by lot No. 3; and on the W. by property claimed by Tuason y Sampedro and Calle Gunao. Area 717.8 square meters

Parcel 3 (lot No. 3, plan 11-13272) - On the N. by lot No. 2; on the E. by Estero de Quiapo; and on the SW. and W. by property claimed by Tuason y Sampedro and Calle Gunao. Area 792.3 square meters

== Marker from National Historical Commission of the Philippines ==
The marker of Aserradora Mecanica de Tuason y Sampedro was installed in 1951 at Globo de Oro cor. Gunao Sts. Quiapo, Manila. It was installed by Philippine Historical Committee (now National Historical Commission of the Philippines).

Original Spanish Text	Translated English Text (courtesy of Joel Lucky C. Aldor)
EN 1880 DON MARIANO SEVERO TUASON Y DON MIGUEL GARCIA SAMPEDRO FUNDAN LA SOCIEDAD MERCANTIL TUASON Y SAMPEDRO, LA QUE MONTA Y OPERA LA PRIMERA SIERRA MECANICA EN MANILA EN SU ACTUAL LOCAL CALLE GLOBO DE ORO, NUM 801-817, QUIAPO. CONTRIBUYEN A LA EXPANSION DE LA INDUSTRIA MADERERA DE PAIS ESTABLECIENDO CORTES DE MADERAS EN CAGAYAN, ISABELA, MINDORO Y MINDANAO. DISPENSA TRATO JUSTO Y EQUITATIVO A SUS NUMEROSOS OBREROS	In 1880, Don Mariano Severo Tuason and Don Miguel Garcia Sampedro founded the "Tuason & Sampedro Mercantile Company", the first to open and operate a mechanical timber factory located at Calle Globo de Oro, No. 801-817, Quiapo. The business contributed to the expansion of the timber industry and established the charters of Cagayan, Isabela, Mindoro and Mindanao. He is known for his fair and equal treatment to his numerous workers.
