= 2025 Navotas local elections =

Local elections in the Philippines

- May 12, 2025
- Mayoral election
Candidate	John Rey Tiangco
Party	Navoteño
Running mate	Tito Sanchez
Popular vote	120,283
Percentage	100.00
Mayor before election
John Rey Tiangco
Navoteño
Elected Mayor
John Rey Tiangco
Navoteño
- Vice mayoral election
Candidate	Tito Sanchez
Party	Navoteño
Popular vote	110,981
Percentage	100.00
Vice Mayor before election
Tito Sanchez
Navoteño
Elected Vice Mayor
Tito Sanchez
Navoteño
- City Council election

16 of 18 seats in the Navotas City Council 10 seats needed for a majority
Party	Navoteño
Last election	12 seats, 100%
Current seats	12

Local elections were held in Navotas on May 12, 2025, as part of the 2025 Philippine general election. The electorate will elect a mayor, a vice mayor, 16 members of the, and district representative to the House of Representatives of the Philippines. The officials elected in the election will assume their respective offices on June 30, 2025, for a three-year-long term.

== Background ==
Incumbent Mayor John Rey Tiangco ran for re-elect mayor for his second term.

== Result ==
=== Mayor ===
Incumbent Mayor John Rey Tiangco of Partido Navoteño won re-election for a second term unopposed.

Candidate	Party	Votes	%
John Rey Tiangco (incumbent)	Partido Navoteño	120,283	100.00
Total		120,283	100.00
Registered voters/turnout		157,065	–
Partido Navoteño hold			
Source: Commission on Elections

=== Vice Mayor ===
Incumbent Vice Mayor Tito Sanchez of Partido Navoteño won re-election for a second term unopposed.

Candidate	Party	Votes	%
Tito Sanchez (incumbent)	Partido Navoteño	110,981	100.00
Total		110,981	100.00
Registered voters/turnout		157,065	–
Partido Navoteño hold			
Source: Commission on Elections

=== Congressional elections ===
Incumbent Toby Tiangco (Partido Navoteño) won for a second term. He was elected with 62.85% of the vote in 2022.

Candidate	Party	Votes	%
Toby Tiangco (incumbent)	Partido Navoteño	116,622	96.36
Tony Ibañez	Independent	4,403	3.64
Total		121,025	100.00
Source: Commission on Elections

=== City Council ===
The Navotas City Council is composed of 14 councilors, 12 of whom are elected.

The Partido Navoteño won 12 seats, maintaining its majority in the city council.

Party	Votes	%	Seats
Partido Navoteño	522,972	92.79	12
Partido Demokratiko Pilipino	13,168	2.34	0
Independent	27,463	4.87	0
Total	563,603	100.00	12
Registered voters/turnout	157,065	–	

==== 1st district ====
Navotas's 1st councilor district consists of the barangays of Bagumbayan North, Bagumbayan South, Bangculasi, Navotas East, Navotas West, NBBS Dagat-dagatan, NBBS Kaunlaran, NBBS Proper, North Bay Boulevard North, San Rafael Village and Sipac Almacen. Six councilors are elected from this councilor district.

Seven candidates were included in the ballot.

Candidate	Party	Votes	%
Rey Monroy (incumbent)	Partido Navoteño	47,281	17.45
Lance Santiago (incumbent)	Partido Navoteño	42,914	15.84
Mylene Sanchez	Partido Navoteño	41,018	15.14
Anna Nazal	Partido Navoteño	40,725	15.03
RV Vicencio (incumbent)	Partido Navoteño	39,911	14.73
Tarok Maño (incumbent)	Partido Navoteño	37,183	13.72
Dennis Iledan	Independent	21,890	8.08
Total		270,922	100.00
Registered voters/turnout		77,977	–
Source: Commission on Elections

==== 2nd district ====
Navotas's 2nd councilor district consists of the barangays of Daanghari, San Jose, San Roque, Tangos North, Tangos South, Tanza 1 and Tanza 2. Six councilors are elected from this councilor district.

Eight candidates were included in the ballot.

Candidate	Party	Votes	%
Clint Geronimo (incumbent)	Partido Navoteño	51,188	17.49
Migi Naval (incumbent)	Partido Navoteño	49,162	16.80
Abu Gino-gino (incumbent)	Partido Navoteño	45,813	15.65
CJ Santos (incumbent)	Partido Navoteño	45,332	15.49
Liz Lupisan (incumbent)	Partido Navoteño	42,579	14.55
Rochelle Vicencio	Partido Navoteño	39,866	13.62
Richard Carlos	Partido Demokratiko Pilipino	13,168	4.50
Lida Ibong	Independent	5,573	1.90
Total		292,681	100.00
Registered voters/turnout		79,088	–
Source: Commission on Elections
