= 2016 Navotas local elections =

Philippine election

2016 Navotas mayoral elections
← 2013	May 9, 2016	2019 →
Nominee	John Rey Tiangco
Party	Navoteño
Running mate	Clint Geronimo
Popular vote	87,485
Percentage	100.00
Mayor before election
John Rey Tiangco
Navoteño
Elected mayor
John Rey Tiangco
Navoteño

Local elections in Navotas were held on May 9, 2016, within the Philippine general election. The voters elected for the mayor, vice mayor, one congressman, and the councilors – six in each of the city's two districts.

== Background ==
Incumbent Mayor John Rey Tiangco ran again without opponents. Vice Mayor Clint Geronimo also ran unopposed.

Navotas Representative Toby Tiangco, who was also the spokesman of the United Nationalist Alliance party of Vice President Jejomar Binay) also sought re-election, and faced independent candidate Dong Luna.

== Candidates ==
Incumbents are represented in italics.

=== Representative, Lone District ===
2016 Philippine House of Representatives election in Navotas Lone District
Party	Candidate	Votes	%
UNA	Tobias Reynald Tiangco	84,550	95.66
Independent	Dong Luna	3,827	4.33
Total votes		102,600	100.00
UNA hold			

=== Mayor ===
Navotas Mayoralty Election
Party	Candidate	Votes	%
Navoteño	John Reynald Tiangco	87,485	100.00
Total votes		102,600	100.00
Navoteño hold			

=== Vice Mayor ===
Navotas Vice Mayoralty Election
Party	Candidate	Votes	%
Navoteño	Clint Nicholas Geronimo	79,753	100.00
Total votes		102,007	100.00
Navoteño hold			

=== Councilors ===
==== District 1 ====
Navotas City Council election - District 1
Party	Candidate	Votes	%
Navoteño	Reynaldo "Doc Rey" Monroy	36,078	15.54
Navoteño	Gerardo "Jack" Santiago	33,062	14.24
Navoteño	Richard San Juan	28,500	12.28
Navoteño	Alfredo "Boy" Vicencio	28,042	12.08
Navoteño	Ethel Joy Arriola	27,655	11.91
Navoteño	Alvin Jason "Kid" Nazal	26,916	11.59
Independent	Joselito Sulit	20,866	8.99
Independent	Alma Basa	17,486	7.53
Independent	Armando "Boy" Almocera	13,469	5.80
Total votes		51,022	100.00

==== District 2 ====
Navotas City Council election - District 2
Party	Candidate	Votes	%
Navoteño	Marielle del Rosario-Tumangan	35,916	16.40
Independent	Dan Israel "DI" Ang	34,044	15.54
Navoteño	Ronaldo "Steve" Naval	33,728	15.40
Navoteño	Arnel Lupisan	31,087	14.19
Navoteño	Neil Cruz	29,278	13.37
Navoteño	Carlito "Don" de Guzman, Jr.	28,325	12.93
Navoteño	Orlando "Orlie" Castro	26,584	12.14
Total votes		50,985	100.00
