= 2022 Navotas local elections =

Philippine election

2022 Navotas mayoral elections
- May 9, 2022
		AKSYON	IND
Nominee	John Rey Tiangco	Raymond Cruz	Mario Camacho
Party	Navoteño	Aksyon	Independent
Running mate	Tito Sanchez	Rico De Guzman	Fredie Maiquez
Popular vote	80,908	44,970	303
Percentage	64.12	35.64	0.24
Mayor before election
Toby Tiangco
Navoteño
Elected mayor
John Rey Tiangco
Navoteño

Local elections in Navotas took place on May 9, 2022, within the Philippine general election. The voters elected for the mayor, vice mayor, one congressman, and the councilors – six in each of the city's two districts.

== Background ==
Incumbent Representative John Rey Tiangco ran for mayor, switching positions with his brother, former congressman and incumbent mayor Toby Tiangco. He was challenged by Raymond "RC" Cruz and Mario Camacho.

Incumbent vice-mayor Clint Geronimo was term-limited and ran for a seat in City Council for 2nd District. Councilor Tito Sanchez ran in his place. His opponents were Rico de Guzman and Fredie Maiquez.

Mayor Toby Tiangco ran for district representative against former vice mayor Lutgardo Cruz.

== Opinion polling ==
=== For Mayor ===
Candidates
Source of poll aggregation	Dates administered	RC Cruz	John Rey Tiangco
RP-Mission and Development Foundation Inc. (RPMDinc.)	October 17–26, 2021	13%	75%

== Candidates ==
=== Administration coalition ===
Team Saya All
#	Name	Party
For House Of Representatives
2.	Tobias Reynald "Toby" Tiangco	Navoteño
For Mayor
3.	John Reynald "John Rey" Tiangco	Navoteño
For Vice Mayor
3.	Tito "Kap Tito" Sanchez	Navoteño
For Councilors (1st District)
2.	Edgardo "Tarok" Maño	Navoteño
3.	Reynaldo "Doc Rey" Monroy	Navoteño
4.	Alvin Jason "Kid" Nazal	Navoteño
5.	Richard San Juan	Navoteño
6.	Lance Angelo "Lance" Santiago	Navoteño
8.	Arvie John "RV" Vicencio	Navoteño
For Councilors (2nd District)
1.	Neil Adrian "Neil" Cruz	Navoteño
3.	Clint Nicolas "Clint" Geronimo	Navoteño
4.	Emil Justin Angelo "Abu" Gino-gino	Navoteño
6.	Analiza "Liz" Lupisan	Navoteño
7.	Ron Hansel Miguel "Migi" Naval	Navoteño
8.	Cesar Justine "CJ" Santos	Navoteño

=== Primary opposition coalition ===
Team Bagong Navotas
#	Name	Party
For House Of Representatives
1.	Lutgardo "Gardy" Cruz	Aksyon
For Mayor
2.	Raymond "RC" Cruz	Aksyon
For Vice Mayor
1.	Rico "Icoy" De Guzman	Aksyon
For Councilors (1st District)
1.	Anne Margarett "Anne" Gaa	Aksyon
7.	Joselito "Lito" Sulit	Aksyon
For Councilors (2nd District)
2.	Maria Lourdes "Marielle" Del Rosario-Tumangan	Aksyon
5.	Aljohn Grutas	Aksyon

=== Independent candidates ===
#	Name	Party
For Mayor
1.	Mario Camacho	Independent
For Vice Mayor
2.	Fredie Maiquez	Independent
For Councilor (2nd District)
9.	Romy "Romy-V" Victuelles	Independent

== Results ==
Incumbents are represented in italics.

=== Mayoral election ===
Incumbent Mayor Toby Tiangco is running for congressman. His brother, incumbent Representative John Rey Tiangco, is his party's nominee.

2022 Navotas mayoralty election
Party	Candidate	Votes	%
Navoteño	John Reynald "John Rey" Tiangco	80,908	64.12
Aksyon	Raymond "RC" Cruz	44,970	35.64
Independent	Mario Camacho	303	0.24
Total votes		126,181	100.00
Navoteño hold			

=== Vice mayoral election ===
Incumbent Vice Mayor Clint Geronimo is term-limited and will run for city councilor in 2nd District. His party nominated 2nd District Councilor Tito Sanchez.

2022 Navotas vice-mayoralty election
Party	Candidate	Votes	%
Navoteño	Tito "Kap Tito" Sanchez	84,065	72.18
Aksyon	Rico "Icoy" De Guzman	30,948	26.57
Independent	Fredie Maiquez	1,453	1.25
Total votes		116,466	100.00
Navoteño hold			

=== Congressional election ===
Incumbent Representative John Rey Tiangco is running for Mayor. His brother, incumbent Mayor Toby Tiangco, is his party's nominee.

2022 Philippine House of Representatives election in Navotas's Lone District
Party	Candidate	Votes	%
Navoteño	Tobias Reynald Tiangco	79,505	62.85
Aksyon	Lutgardo "Gardy" Cruz	46,991	37.15
Total votes		126,496	100.00
Navoteño hold			

=== City council elections ===
Party	Votes	%	Seats
Partido Navoteño	474,737	80.31	12
Aksyon Demokratiko	112,465	19.03	0
Independent	3,905	0.66	0
Ex officio seats			2
Total	591,107	100.00	14

==== 1st District ====
2022 Navotas City Council election at the 1st district of Navotas
Party	Candidate	Votes	%
Navoteño	Reynaldo "Doc Rey" Monroy	45,606	
Navoteño	Arvie John "RV" Vicencio (Incumbent)	37,753	
Navoteño	Lance Angelo "Lance" Santiago	37,460	
Navoteño	Richard San Juan	36,574	
Navoteño	Alvin Jason "Kid" Nazal (Incumbent)	35,674	
Navoteño	Edgardo "Tarok" Maño (Incumbent)	34,910	
Aksyon	Joselito "Lito" Sulit	30,977	
Aksyon	Anne Margarett "Anne" Gaa	25,674	
Total votes		284,628	100.00

Party	Votes	%	Seats
Partido Navoteño	227,977	80.10	6
Aksyon Demokratiko	56,651	19.90	0
Total	284,628	100.00	6

==== 2nd District ====
2022 Navotas City Council election at the 2nd district of Navotas
Party	Candidate	Votes	%
Navoteño	Ron Hansel Miguel "Migi" Naval (Incumbent)	45,748	
Navoteño	Clint Nicolas "Clint" Geronimo	43,821	
Navoteño	Cesar Justine "CJ" Santos (Incumbent)	41,990	
Navoteño	Neil Adrian "Neil" Cruz (Incumbent)	41,193	
Navoteño	Emil Justin Angelo "Abu" Gino-gino	38,748	
Navoteño	Analiza "Liz" Lupisan	35,260	
Aksyon	Maria Lourdes "Marielle" Del Rosario-Tumangan	34,799	
Aksyon	Aljohn Grutas	21,015	
Independent	Romy "Romy V" Victuelles	3,905	
Total votes		306,479	100.00

Party	Votes	%	Seats
Partido Navoteño	246,760	80.51	6
Aksyon Demokratiko	55,814	18.21	0
Independent	3,905	1.27	0
Total	306,479	100.00	6
