= 2010 Navotas local elections =

Philippine election

2010 Navotas mayoral elections
| ← 2007 | May 10, 2010 | 2013 → |
| Nominee | John Reynold Tiangco |
| Party | Navoteño |
| Running mate | Patrick Joseph Javier |
| Popular vote | 76,158 |
| Percentage | 100.00 |
Mayor before election
Tobias Reynald Tiangco
Navoteño
Elected mayor
John Reynold Tiangco
Navoteño

Local elections was held in the city of Navotas on May 10, 2010 within the Philippine general election. The brother (John Rey Tiangco) of the incumbent-mayor, Toby Tiangco was elected to the city mayoralty. Partido Navoteño won a majority of won seats.

== Mayoral and vice mayoral election ==
Incumbents mayor Tobias Reynald Tiangco and vice mayor Patrick Joseph Javier were on their third term as mayor and second term as vice mayor of Navotas, respectively. Toby's brother, John Rey, announced that he would run for the mayoralty of the city. They are running under the Nationalist People's Coalition although Javier was endorsed by the Liberal Party. If Javier wins, he will be on his third and final term. Mayor Tiangco is running for a congressional post in the Lone District. If he wins, he will be the first to represent the city in the House of Representatives. The Tiangco brothers and Javier will run unopposed.

=== Partido Navoteño ===
- A Business Man John Rey Tiangco (mayor)
- Vice Mayor Patrick Joseph Javier (standing for a third term, vice mayor)
- Mayor Toby Tiangco (congressman)
- Former Barangay Captain Ernani "Nani" Calayag (standing for a second term, councillor, District I)
- Frabelle worker Domingo "Domeng" Elape (standing for a third term, councillor, District I)
- Barangay Kagawad Edgardo "Eddie Tarok" Manio (standing for a second term, councillor, District I)
- Former Barangay Captain Bernardo "Bernie" Nazal (councillor, District I)
- SK Chairman Richard San Juan (councillor, District I)
- Barangay Captain Alfredo "Boy" Vicencio (councillor, District I)
- Enchong Araga (councillor, District II)
- Councilor Clint Geronimo (standing for a third term, councillor, District II)
- Councilor Ricky Gino Gino (standing for a second term, councillor, District II)
- Councilor Analiza "Liz" Lupisan (standing for a third term, councillor, District II)
- Councilor Marielle Del Rosario (councillor, District II)
- Cesario "Cesar" Santos (councillor, District II)

=== Independent ===
- Reynaldo "Doc Rey" Monroy (councillor, District I)
- Jose Norman "Jojo" Magpoc (councillor, District I)
- Editha "Edith" Santos (councillor, District I)
- Enrico "Rico" Miralles (councillor, District I)
- Avelino "Jun" Nacar Jr. (councillor, District I)
- Maria Elsa Bautista (councillor, District II)
- Ronaldo "Steve" Naval (councillor, District II)

== Results ==
The candidates for mayor and vice mayor with the highest number of votes wins the seat; they are voted separately, therefore, they may be of different parties when elected. All candidates with party affiliation are supported by Partido Navoteño, the only local party in the city.

=== Mayoral election results ===
Navotas mayoral election
| Party | Candidate | Votes | % |
|---|---|---|---|
| Navoteño | John Reynold "John Rey" Tiangco | 76,158 | 100.00 |
| Valid ballots | | 76,158 | 84.03 |
| Invalid or blank votes | | 14,472 | 15.97 |
| Total votes | | 90,630 | 100.00 |
| Navoteño hold | | | |

=== Vice Mayoral election results ===
Navotas vice mayoral election
| Party | Candidate | Votes | % |
|---|---|---|---|
| Navoteño | Patrick Joseph "PJ" Javier^{[A]} | 73,576 | 100.00 |
| Valid ballots | | 73,576 | 81.18 |
| Invalid or blank votes | | 17,054 | 18.82 |
| Total votes | | 90,630 | 100.00 |
| Navoteño hold | | | |

=== Congressional election results ===
Philippine House of Representatives election at Navotas
| Party | Candidate | Votes | % |
|---|---|---|---|
| Navoteño | Tobias Reynald "Toby" Tiangco | 76,276 | 100.0 |
| Valid ballots | | 76,276 | 84.16 |
| Invalid or blank votes | | 14,354 | 15.84 |
| Total votes | | 90,630 | 100.00 |
| Navoteño win (new seat) | | | |

=== City Council elections ===
Each of Navotas's two legislative districts elects six councilors to the City Council. The six candidates with the highest number of votes wins the seats per district. Some who are running are the same names from 2007.

| Party | Votes | % | Seats |
|---|---|---|---|
| Partido Navoteño | 300,363 | 70.77 | 9 |
| Independent | 124,088 | 29.23 | 3 |
| Ex officio seats | | | 2 |
| Total | 424,451 | 100.00 | 14 |
| Total votes | 83,379 | – | |

==== District 1 ====
City Council election at Navotas' 1st district
| Party | Candidate | Votes | % |
|---|---|---|---|
| Navoteño | Domingo "Domeng" Elape | 30,343 | 13.66 |
| Navoteño | Richard San Juan | 26,105 | 11.75 |
| Navoteño | Alfredo "Boy" Vicencio | 25,687 | 11.56 |
| Navoteño | Edgardo "Eddie Tarok" Maño | 25,270 | 11.38 |
| Independent | Reynaldo "Doc Rey" Monroy | 22,387 | 10.08 |
| Navoteño | Bernardo "Bernie" Nazal | 21,414 | 10.01 |
| Navoteño | Ernani "Nani" Calayag | 21,306 | 9.59 |
| Independent | Jose Norman "Jojo" Magpoc | 16,354 | 7.36 |
| Independent | Recelle "Bong" Miralles | 11,187 | 5.04 |
| Independent | Edita "Edith" Santos | 7,528 | 3.39 |
| Independent | Avelino "Jun" Nacar Jr. | 6,938 | 3.12 |
| Independent | Ricardo "Ric" Balasa | 6,805 | 3.06 |
| Total votes | | 46,414 | 100.00 |

==== District 2 ====
City Council election at Navotas' 2nd district
| Party | Candidate | Votes | % |
|---|---|---|---|
| Navoteño | Clint Nicolas "Clint" Geronimo^{[C]} | 30,342 | 15.00 |
| Independent | Maria Elsa "Elsa" Bautista | 27,416 | 13.55 |
| Navoteño | Maria Lourdes "Marielle" Del Rosario | 27,177 | 13.43 |
| Navoteño | Enrico "Ricky" Gino-gino | 26,952 | 13.32 |
| Navoteño | Analiza "Liz" Lupisan | 25,912 | 12.81 |
| Independent | Ronaldo "Steve" Naval | 25,473 | 12.59 |
| Navoteño | Cesario "Cesar" Santos | 21,335 | 10.55 |
| Navoteño | Florencio "Enchong" Araga | 17,706 | 8.75 |
| Total votes | | 44,216 | 100.00 |

Notes

- A Javier is endorsed by the Liberal Party.
- B Includes one candidate co-endorsed by the Nacionalista Party
- C Geronimo is endorsed by the Nacionalista Party.
