= Tiangco =

Tiangco is a Filipino surname. Notable people with the surname include:

- Mel Tiangco (born 1955), Filipino broadcaster
- Jeremiah Tiangco (born 1997), Filipino singer
- John Rey Tiangco (born 1972), Filipino politician
- Toby Tiangco (born 1967), Filipino businessman and politician
- Jamisen Tiangco (born 1981), Filipino-American singer/dancer
