= 2019 Navotas local elections =

Philippine election

2019 Navotas mayoral elections
- May 13, 2019
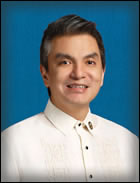
Nominee	Tobias Reynald Tiangco	Dan Israel Ang
Party	Navoteño	PFP
Running mate	Clint Nicolas Geronimo (PDP–Laban)	Raymond Cruz (Aksyon)
Popular vote	79,262	33,469
Percentage	68.82	29.06
Mayor before election
John Rey Tiangco
Navoteño
Elected mayor
Toby Tiangco
Navoteño

Local elections in Navotas were held on May 13, 2019, within the Philippine general election. The voters elected for the mayor, vice mayor, one congressman, and the councilors – six in each of the city's two districts.

== Background ==
Incumbent Mayor John Rey Tiangco, who has fulfilled the limit of three terms for the position, ran for the city's congressional seat, switching positions with his brother, former mayor Toby. Incumbent vice-mayor Clint Geronimo is also running for re-election.

They fought against the candidates of Damayan ng Responsableng Mamamayan (DRM Team), a coalition of Partido Federal ng Pilipinas (PFP) and Aksyon Demokratiko (Aksyon). They are incumbent 2nd district councilor Dan Israel "DI" Ang (PFP, for mayor), former vice-mayor Lutgardo "Gardy" Cruz's son Raymond "RC" Cruz (Aksyon, for vice mayor) and incumbent 2nd district councilor Marielle del Rosario-Tumangan (Aksyon, for congressman).

The Tiangcos' political party Partido Navoteño (Navoteño) signed an agreement with Hugpong ng Pagbabago (HNP), the party of Pres. Rodrigo Duterte's daughter Sara Duterte-Carpio for the election.

=== Vote buying allegations ===
On May 12, 2019, NBI agents raided the briefing of poll watchers for Damayan ng Responsableng Mamamayan and Akbayan Party-List at a gymnasium in Barangay Daanghari (2nd District) due to allegations of vote buying. Emilio Marañon III, lawyer of congressional candidate Marielle del Rosario-Tumangan, denied the allegations and called the NBI operation "illegal".

== Candidates ==
Incumbents are represented in italics.

=== Representative, Lone District ===
Incumbent Representative Toby Tiangco is term-limited and is running for Mayor. His brother, incumbent Mayor John Reynald Tiangco, is his party's nominee.

2019 Philippine House of Representatives election in Navotas's Lone District
Party	Candidate	Votes	%
Navoteño	John Reynald "John Rey" Tiangco	80,774	70.14
Aksyon	Marielle del Rosario-Tumangan	30,267	26.28
Invalid or blank votes		4,125	3.58
Total votes		115,166	100.00
Navoteño hold			

=== Mayor ===
Incumbent Mayor John Rey Tiangco is term-limited and is running for congressman. His brother, incumbent Representative Toby Tiangco, is his party's nominee.

2019 Navotas mayoralty election
Party	Candidate	Votes	%
Navoteño	Tobias Reynald "Toby" Tiangco	79,262	68.82
PFP	Dan Israel "DI" Ang	33,469	29.06
Invalid or blank votes		2,435	2.12
Total votes		115,166	100.00
Navoteño hold			

=== Vice-Mayor ===
Incumbent Vice-Mayor Clint Geronimo is running for re-election against Raymond "RC" Cruz.

2019 Navotas vice-mayoralty election
Party	Candidate	Votes	%
PDP–Laban	Clint Nicolas "Vice Clint" Geronimo	62,858	54.58
Aksyon	Raymond "RC" Cruz	47,012	40.84
Invalid or blank votes		5,246	4.58
Total votes		115,166	100.00
PDP–Laban hold			

=== Councilors ===
==== By ticket ====
===== Team JTC =====
Navoteño/PDP–Laban/NPC/PFP/Team JTC (1st District)
Name	Party
Ethel Joy "Atty. EJ" Arriola	NPC
Edgardo "Tarok" Maño	PFP
Julia Monroy	Navoteño
Alvin Jason "Kid" Nazal	Navoteño
Gerardo "Jack" Santiago	PDP–Laban
Arvie John "RV" Vicencio	Navoteño

Navoteño/PDP–Laban/Team JTC (2nd District)
Name	Party
Neil Adrian "Neil" Cruz	Navoteño
Carlito "Don" de Guzman, Jr.	Navoteño
Arnel Lupisan	Navoteño
Ron Hansel Miguel "Migi" Naval	PDP–Laban
Tito "Kap Tito" Sanchez	Navoteño
Cesar Justine "CJ" Santos	PDP–Laban

===== Damayan ng Responsableng Mamamayan =====
PFP/Aksyon/Damayan ng Responsableng Mamamayan (1st District)
Name	Party
Edralyn "Essay" Abella	Aksyon
Levie Ayuda	PFP
Anne Margarett "Anne" Gaa	PFP
Raeven Kyle "Kyle" Gonzales	PFP
Ghian Carlo "Ghian" So	PFP
Joselito "Lito" Sulit	Aksyon

PFP/Aksyon/Damayan ng Responsableng Mamamayan (2nd District)
Name	Party
Michael "Mike" Bautista	PFP
Philip Neri "Philip" del Rosario	Aksyon
Aljohn Grutas	Aksyon
Amos Rey "Amos" Hechanova	PFP
Gina Navarro-Manalang	PFP
Romualdo "Waldy" Punongbayan	Aksyon

===== Independent =====
Independent (1st District)
Name	Party
Rolando "Boy" Cabral	Independent
Domingo "Doming" Elape	Independent
Orlando "Lando LG" Garcia	Independent
Rodante "Dan" Villano	Independent

Independent (2nd District)
Name	Party
Michael "Mugssy" Castro	Independent
Joseph Flores	Independent

==== By district ====
===== 1st District =====
2019 Navotas City Council election at the 1st district of Navotas
Party	Candidate	Votes	%
Navoteño	Julia Monroy	33,255	
NPC	Ethel Joy "Atty. EJ" Arriola	31,181	
PDP–Laban	Gerardo "Jack" Santiago	30,995	
PFP	Edgardo "Tarok" Maño	27,560	
Navoteño	Arvie John "RV" Vicencio	24,860	
Navoteño	Alvin Jason "Kid" Nazal	24,578	
Aksyon	Joselito "Lito" Sulit	18,804	
Independent	Domingo "Doming" Elape	16,437	
PFP	Anne Margarett "Anne" Gaa	15,801	
Aksyon	Edralyn "Essay" Abella	13,785	
PFP	Raeven Kyle "Kyle" Gonzales	12,746	
PFP	Ghian Carlo "Ghian" So	11,745	
PFP	Levie Ayuda	8,960	
Independent	Orlando "Lando LG" Garcia	5,062	
Independent	Rodante "Dan" Villano	4,468	
Independent	Rolando "Boy" Cabral	3,947	
Total votes		284,184	100.00

Party or alliance		Votes	%	Seats
Team JTC	Partido Navoteño	82,693	29.10	3
Team JTC	Nationalist People's Coalition	31,181	10.97	1
Team JTC	Partido Demokratiko Pilipino-Lakas ng Bayan	30,995	10.91	1
Team JTC	Partido Federal ng Pilipinas	27,560	9.70	1
Team JTC	Total	172,429	60.68	6
DRM Team	Partido Federal ng Pilipinas	49,252	17.33	0
DRM Team	Aksyon Demokratiko	32,589	11.47	0
DRM Team	Total	81,841	28.80	0
Independent		29,914	10.53	0
Total		284,184	100.00	6

===== 2nd District =====
2019 Navotas City Council election at the 2nd district of Navotas
Party	Candidate	Votes	%
Navoteño	Tito "Kap Tito" Sanchez	36,942	
Navoteño	Arnel Lupisan	32,720	
PDP–Laban	Cesar Justine "CJ" Santos	30,570	
Navoteño	Neil Adrian "Neil" Cruz	30,514	
PDP–Laban	Ron Hansel Miguel "Migi" Naval	30,434	
Navoteño	Carlito "Don" de Guzman, Jr.	28,130	
PFP	Amos Rey "Amos" Hechanova	16,305	
PFP	Gina Navarro-Manalang	16,293	
Aksyon	Philip Neri "Philip" del Rosario	16,138	
Aksyon	Romualdo "Waldy" Punongbayan	13,580	
PFP	Michael "Mike" Bautista	12,662	
Aksyon	Aljohn Grutas	10,914	
Independent	Michael "Mugssy" Castro	9,196	
Independent	Joseph Flores	2,308	
Total votes		286,706	100.00

Party or alliance		Votes	%	Seats
Team JTC	Partido Navoteño	128,306	44.75	4
Team JTC	Partido Demokratiko Pilipino-Lakas ng Bayan	61,004	21.28	2
Team JTC	Total	189,310	66.03	6
DRM Team	Partido Federal ng Pilipinas	45,260	15.79	0
DRM Team	Aksyon Demokratiko	40,632	14.17	0
DRM Team	Total	85,892	29.96	0
Independent		11,504	4.01	0
Total		286,706	100.00	6
