= 2013 Navotas local elections =

Philippine election

2013 Navotas mayoral elections
← 2010	May 13, 2013	2016 →
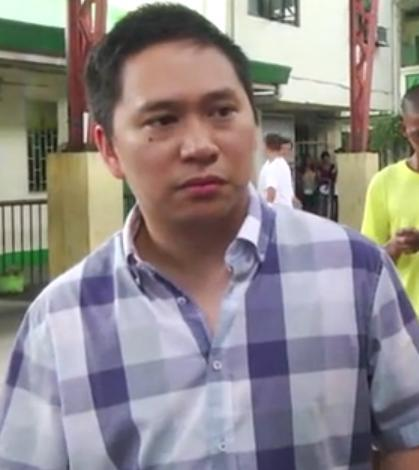
Nominee	John Rey Tiangco	Patrick Joseph Javier
Party	UNA	Liberal
Running mate	Clint Geronimo	Elsa Bautista-Teodoro
Popular vote	60,277	29,387
Percentage	67.23	32.77
Mayor before election
John Rey Tiangco
UNA
Elected mayor
John Rey Tiangco
UNA

Local elections were held in the city of Navotas on May 13, 2013 within the Philippine general election. Re-electionist mayor John Rey Tiangco won with a margin of almost 50% on his closest rival and the incumbent vice-mayor, Patrick Joseph Javier who was replaced by the winner of the vice-mayoral elections.

== Opinion polling ==
=== Mayoral election ===
==== Three-candidate race ====
Pollster	Date(s) administered	Sample size	Margin of error	John Rey Tiangco	Patrick Joseph Javier	Clint Geronimo
Anti-EPAL Navotas	March 14–16, 2013	500	±3%	47%	**48%**	5%

==== Two-candidate race ====
Pollster	Date(s) administered	Sample size	Margin of error	Tiangco	Javier
Anti-EPAL Navotas	March 14–16, 2013	500	±3%	49.65%	**51.35%**

Pollster	Date(s) administered	Sample size	Margin of error	Tiangco	Javier
Anti-EPAL Navotas	April 4–6, 2013	500	±3%	**69.45%**	31.55%

Pollster	Date(s) administered	Sample size	Margin of error	Tiangco	Javier
ElectionsNavotas Surveys	April 23, 2013	800	±3%	37%	**63%**

=== Vice-mayoral elections ===
Pollster	Date(s) administered	Sample size	Margin of error	Bautista	Geronimo
ElectionsNavotas Surveys	April 23, 2013	800	±3%	18%	**82%**

=== HoR elections ===
Pollster	Date(s) administered	Sample size	Margin of error	Tiangco	De Guzman
ElectionsNavotas Surveys	April 23, 2013	800	±3%	49%	**51%**

- Bold text indicates the winner.

== Candidates ==
=== Partido Navoteño-UNA coalition (Team Navotas) ===
- Mayor John Rey Tiangco (re-electionist for second term)
- District II Councilor Clint Geronimo (vice mayor)
- Rep. Toby Tiangco (re-electionist for second term)
- Barangay Kagawad Ethel Joy Arriola (councilor, District I)
- Former Barangay Kagawad Eddie Tarok Manio (re-electionist for third term, councilor, District I)
- Dr. Rey Monroy (re-electionist for second term, councilor, District I)
- Former SK Chairman Richard San Juan (re-electionist for second term, councilor, District I)
- Air21 Assistant coach Jack Santiago will run again (councilor, District I)
- Former Barangay Captain Alfredo Boy Vicencio (re-electionist for second term, councilor, District I)
- Former Barangay Captain Orlie Castro (councilor, District II)
- Don Don De Guzman (councilor, District II)
- Marielle Del Rosario (re-electionist for second term, councilor, District II)
- Ricky Gino Gino (re-electionist for third term, councilor, District II)
- Arnel Lupisan (councilor, District II)
- Steve Naval (councilor, District II)

=== Partido Liberal-NPC coalition (Team Laban Navotas) ===
- Vice Mayor Patrick Joseph Javier (mayor)
- District II Coun. Elsa Bautista-Teodoro (vice mayor)
- Barangay Kagawad Icoy de Guzman (congressman)
- Former Barangay Kagawad Manuel Cabingas (councilor, District I)
- Former Barangay Kagawad Jojo Magpoc (councilor, District I)
- Former Barangay Kagawad Ronnie Salvador (councilor, District I)
- Barangay Captain Lito Sulit (councilor, District I)
- Dok. Nelson Varela (councilor, District I)
- SK Chairman Nico Magbiray (councilor, District II)
- Ferdinand Pascual (councilor, District II)
- Drydel Raymundo (councilor, District II)

=== PLM ===
- PLM - Severino Mendoza (councilor, District II)

=== Independent ===
- Joselito Alvarez (councilor, District I)
- Joseph Kwe (councilor, District I)
- Arlan Alarcon (councilor, District II)

=== Party-switching ===
Politician	Running for	Old party	New party
Elsa Bautista-Teodoro	vice mayor	Independent	NPC
Jose Norman Magpoc	councilor	Independent	Liberal
Reynaldo Monroy	councilor	Independent	UNA
Ronaldo Naval	councilor	Independent	UNA
Jose Ronnie Salvador	councilor	UNA	Liberal

=== Incumbents who will run for other positions, or will not run ===
Politician	Position	Reason	Party
Elsa Bautista-Teodoro	councilor	running for vice mayor	NPC
Domingo Elape	councilor	will not run, term-limited	UNA
Clint Geronimo	councilor	running for vice-mayor	UNA
PJ Javier	vice mayor	term-limited, running for mayor	Liberal
Analiza Lupisan	councilor	will not run, replaced by husband Arnel	UNA

== Results ==
=== Mayoral elections ===
Mayor John Rey Tiangco won against Vice Mayor Patrick Joseph Javier.

2013 Navotas mayoral election
Party	Candidate	Votes	%
UNA	John Rey Tiangco	60,277	67.23
Liberal	Patrick Joseph Javier	29,387	32.77
Margin of victory		30,890	34.46
Total votes		89,664	100.00
UNA hold			

=== Vice mayoral elections ===
1st district Councilor Clint Geronimo won against 2nd district Councilor Elsa Bautista-Teodoro.

2013 Navotas vice-mayoral election
Party	Candidate	Votes	%
UNA	Clint Geronimo	53,231	61.77
Liberal	Elsa Bautista-Teodoro	32,951	38.23
Margin of victory		20,280	23.54
Total votes		86,182	100.00
UNA hold			

=== House of Representatives elections ===
Toby Tiangco is the incumbent. He is under Partido Navoteño, the ruling local party, which would contest this election at the banner of the United Nationalist Alliance. (He is also UNA's national secretary-general.)

2013 Navotas legislative election
Party	Candidate	Votes	%
UNA	Toby Tiangco	69,107	80.21
Liberal	Rico Jose De Guzman	17,048	19.79
Margin of victory		52,059	60.42
Total votes		86,155	100.00
UNA hold			

=== City Council elections ===
Each of Navotas's two legislative districts elects six councilors to the City Council. The six candidates with the highest number of votes win the seats per district. Some who are running are the same names from 2010.

Party	Mayoral/vice mayoral candidate	Total votes		Total seats	
Party	Mayoral/vice mayoral candidate	Total	%	Total	%
UNA (United Nationalist Alliance/Party of the People of Navotas - 10/12 seats, 12 candidates)^{[A]}	John Rey Tiangco	284,420	72.81%	12	100.0%
Liberal (Liberal Party of the Philippines - 1/12 seats, 8 candidates)^{[B]}	Patrick Joseph Javier	95,001	24.32%	0	0.00%
Independents (3 candidates)^{[C]}	none	8,878	2.27%	0	0.00%
PLM (Party of the Laboring Masses - 1 candidate)	none	2,341	0.60%	0	0.00%
Total valid votes cast		390,640	N/A		
Total turnout		92,775	100%		
Total partisan seats				12	85.7%
Seat for Association of Barangay Captains President				1	7.1%
Seat for Association of Sangguniang Kabataan Chairmen President				1	7.1%
Total non-partisan seats				2	14.3%
Total seats				14	100.0%

==== District 1 ====
City Council election at Navotas' 1st district
Party	Candidate	Votes	%
UNA	Reynaldo "Doc Rey" Monroy	27,366	13.78
UNA	Gerardo "Jack" Santiago	23,207	11.69
UNA	Ethel Joy "EJ" Arriola	22,914	11.54
UNA	Edgardo "Tarok" Maño	22,571	11.36
UNA	Richard San Juan	22,129	11.14
UNA	Alfredo "Boy" Vicencio	21,627	10.89
Liberal	Joselito "Lito" Sulit	15,218	7.66
Liberal	Jose Ronnie "Ronnie" Salvador	12,170	6.13
Liberal	Jose Norman "Jojo" Magpoc	11,438	5.76
Liberal	Nelson "Dok Nelson" Varela	9,364	4.71
Liberal	Manuel "Ching" Cabingas	6,530	3.29
Independent	Joselito "Lito" Alvarez	2,799	1.41
Independent	Jose "Joseph" Kwe	1,271	0.64
Total votes		198,604	100.00

==== District 2 ====
City Council election at Navotas' 2nd district
Party	Candidate	Votes	%
UNA	Maria Lourdes "Marielle" Del Rosario-Tumangan	27,547	14.34
UNA	Ronaldo "Steve" Naval	26,285	13.69
UNA	Arnel "Arnel" Lupisan	25,208	13.13
UNA	Enrico "Ricky" Gino-gino	23,073	12.01
UNA	Orlando "Orlie" Castro	21,584	11.24
UNA	Carlito "Don" De Guzman Jr.	20,909	10.89
Liberal	Dominic "Nico" Magbiray	14,840	7.73
Liberal	Ferdinand "Ferdie Bada" Pascual	14,012	7.30
Liberal	Drydel "Drydel" Raymundo	11,429	5.95
Independent	Arlando "Arlan" Alarcon	4,808	2.50
PLM	Severino "Rene" Mendoza	2,341	1.22
Total votes		192,036	100.00

Notes

- A Initially, UNA (as Partido Navoteño) had nine seats after the 2010 election. Later on, Councilors Reynaldo Monroy and Ronaldo "Steve" Naval jumped to the party from being independents, increasing its seats to 11. Prior to this election, District I Coun. Bernardo Nazal died, leaving his seat vacant and decreasing UNA's seat total to 10.
- B Technically, District II Coun. Elsa Bautista is under the Nationalist People's Coalition, which contests this election in alliance with the Liberals. Bautista became a member of NPC in 2012.
- C Initially, there are three independent councilors (Monroy, Bautista and Naval) after the 2010 election, but they later jumped to major parties in 2012.
