= Canuto E. Celestino =

Filipino politician

President of the Municipality of Navotas
- In office 1901–1903
- Succeeded by: Bernardo O. Dagala

Personal details
- Born: Navotas, Philippines
- Occupation: Politician

Canuto Eusebio Celestino (died 1954) was a Filipino politician who served as the President of the Municipality of Navotas, from 1901 until his term expired in 1903. After his term in 1903, Navotas was merged once again with Malabon as one municipality, with Bernardo O. Dagala as the succeeding Municipal President. Canuto Celestino is one of the signatories of the Philippine Declaration of Independence at Cavite el Viejo (present-day Kawit, Cavite) on June 12, 1898. He was born on January 19, 1861, and died of old age on November 16, 1954. He was given a veteran's (Katipunero) funeral and interred at the original Catholic cemetery in Navotas. Canuto attended Colegio de San Juan de Letran and later went on to study medicine at the University of Santo Tomas.
