= Navotas's at-large congressional district =

Legislative district of the Philippines

- Constituency for the House of Representatives of the Philippines
- Map of Metro Manila showing the location of Navotas.
- City: Navotas
- Region: Metro Manila
- Population: 247,543 (2020)
- Electorate: 157,065 (2025)
- Major settlements: Navotas
- Area: 10.77 km^{2} (4.16 sq mi)

Current constituency
- Created: 2007
- Representative: Toby Tiangco
- Political party: Navoteño
- Congressional bloc: Majority

Navotas's at-large congressional district is the congressional district of the Philippines in Navotas. It has been represented in the House of Representatives of the Philippines since 2010. Previously included in Malabon–Navotas's at-large congressional district, it includes all barangays of the city. It is currently represented in the 20th Congress by Toby Tiangco of the Partido Navoteño.

== Representation history ==
#	Image	Member	Term of office		Congress	Party	Electoral history
#	Image	Member	Start	End	Congress	Party	Electoral history
=== Navotas's at-large district for the House of Representatives of the Philippines ===
District created March 10, 2007 from the Malabon–Navotas district.
1		Toby Tiangco	June 30, 2010	June 30, 2019	15th	UNA (Navoteño)	Elected in 2010.
1		Toby Tiangco	June 30, 2010	June 30, 2019	16th	UNA (Navoteño)	Re-elected in 2013.
1		Toby Tiangco	June 30, 2010	June 30, 2019	17th	Navoteño	Re-elected in 2016.
2		John Rey Tiangco	June 30, 2019	June 30, 2022	18th	Navoteño	Elected in 2019.
(1)		Toby Tiangco	June 30, 2022	Incumbent	19th	Navoteño	Elected in 2022.
(1)		Toby Tiangco	June 30, 2022	Incumbent	20th	Navoteño	Re-elected in 2025.

== Election results ==
=== 2010 ===
Philippine House of Representatives election at Navotas
Party	Candidate	Votes	%
Navoteño	Toby Tiangco	76,276	100.00
Valid ballots		76,276	84.16
Invalid or blank votes		14,354	15.84
Total votes		90,630	100.00
Navoteño win (new seat)			

=== 2013 ===
2013 Navotas legislative election
Party	Candidate	Votes	%
UNA	Toby Tiangco	69,107	80.21
Liberal	Rico Jose De Guzman	17,048	19.79
Total votes		86,155	100.00
UNA hold			

=== 2016 ===
2016 Philippine House of Representatives election in Navotas Lone District
Party	Candidate	Votes	%
UNA	Toby Tiangco	84,550	95.67
Independent	Dong Luna	3,827	4.33
Total valid votes		88,377	100.00
Valid ballots		88,377	86.14
Invalid or blank votes		14,223	13.86
Total votes		102,600	100.00
UNA hold			

=== 2019 ===
2019 Philippine House of Representatives election in Navotas's Lone District
Party	Candidate	Votes	%
Navoteño	John Rey Tiangco	80,774	72.74
Aksyon	Marielle del Rosario	30,267	27.26
Total valid votes		111,041	100.00
Valid ballots		111,041	96.42
Invalid or blank votes		4,125	3.58
Total votes		115,166	100.00
Navoteño hold			

=== 2022 ===
2022 Philippine House of Representatives election in Navotas's Lone District
Party	Candidate	Votes	%
Navoteño	Toby Tiangco	79,505	62.85
Aksyon	Lutgardo "Gardy" Cruz	46,991	37.15
Total votes		126,496	100.00
Navoteño hold			

=== 2025 ===
Candidate	Party	Votes	%
Toby Tiangco (incumbent)	Partido Navoteño	116,622	95.57
Tony Ibañez	Independent	5,403	4.43
Total		122,025	100.00
Registered voters/turnout		157,065	–
Partido Navoteño hold			
Source: Commission on Elections

== See also ==
- Legislative district of Navotas
