= Cipriano Bautista =

Filipino engineer and businessman

Cipriano “Efren” C. Bautista

20th Mayor of Navotas
- In office June 30, 1998 – May 11, 2000
- Vice Mayor: Toby Tiangco
- Preceded by: Felipe Del Rosario, Jr.
- Succeeded by: Toby Tiangco

Personal details
- Born: July 11, 1929 Philippine Islands
- Died: May 11, 2000 (aged 70) Navotas, Philippines
- Occupation: Naval Architect, Marine Engineer, Shipbuilder, Businessman

Cipriano C. Bautista (July 11, 1929 – May 11, 2000) was a Filipino engineer and businessman who served as the mayor of Navotas. He started his public service as a Barrio Captain and was awarded as Most Outstanding Barrio Captain of the whole province of Rizal in the 1950s when Navotas was still part of the province. He also served as a Municipal Councilor in 1966 while he was a businessman and a shipbuilder. In 1980, he was elected as Vice Mayor of Navotas. Later elected as Municipal Mayor, defeating the wife of the 12-year incumbent mayor Del Rosario, Jr. in 1998. He served his fellow citizens even after he was diagnosed with cancer until his death in 2000.
