= Tommy Tiangco =

Filipino content creator (born 1996)

- Born: Tobias Miguel Tiangco; October 18, 1996 (age 30)
- Education: Ateneo de Manila University (BS)
- Occupations: Content creator; entrepreneur; financial analyst
- Years active: 2018–present
- Father: Toby Tiangco

Tobias Miguel "Tommy" Tiangco (born October 18, 1996), is a Filipino content creator and entrepreneur. He is known for his videos on social media platforms, where he uses self-deprecating humor. He is the son of Navotas congressman Toby Tiangco and Michelle Romuáldez-Yap. In 2025, he launched the YouTube channel Tim N' Tom with vlogger Timothy Laude.

== Early life and education ==
Tiangco was born on October 18, 1996, to politician Toby Tiangco and Michelle Yap Romuáldez. He finished high school at Xavier School in 2014 and studied management at Ateneo de Manila University. As a child, Tiangco struggled with obesity and experienced bullying and body-shaming. He later began exercising and lifting weights as part of his fitness journey.

== Career ==
In 2018, Tiangco won the Fitspiration Youth Award in a search organized by Gold's Gym. He also joined the Century Tuna Superbods competition that year, where he received the Superbod Beach Bod and People's Choice special awards. Tiangco became known for his videos on social media, where he uses self-deprecating humor. He posts content on platforms such as TikTok, Facebook, and YouTube.

In 2025, Tiangco and Timothy Laude, the son of entrepreneur Small Laude, launched the YouTube channel Tim N' Tom. Tiangco received the Smile and Service Award at the TikTok Live Awards Philippines 2025.

In July 2026, The Philippine Star reported that Tiangco had more than one million followers across social media. He also owns Oliver's Coffee and Popeyes franchises. Tiangco's LinkedIn profile lists him as a financial analyst at San Miguel Corporation. He is also the founder of Mito Construction and Development Corporation. He has also appeared on television, including the game show Family Feud and the web series On the Spot with Laude.

== Personal life ==
Tiangco plays basketball and tennis. He has been lifting weights since he was 18 years old.

== Filmography ==
=== Television and web appearances ===
Year	Title	Role	Ref.
2025	Family Feud	Himself	
2026	On the Spot	Himself	
