= NNHS =

NNHS may refer to:

- Newport News High School, Newport News, Virginia, United States
- Naperville North High School, Naperville, Illinois, United States
- Navotas National High School, Navotas, Philippines
- Newton North High School, Newton, Massachusetts, United States
- Niles North High School, Skokie, Illinois, United States
- Northern Nash High School, Rocky Mount, North Carolina, United States
