= Mayor of Navotas =

Local chief executive of Navotas, Philippines

- Punong Lungsod ng Navotas
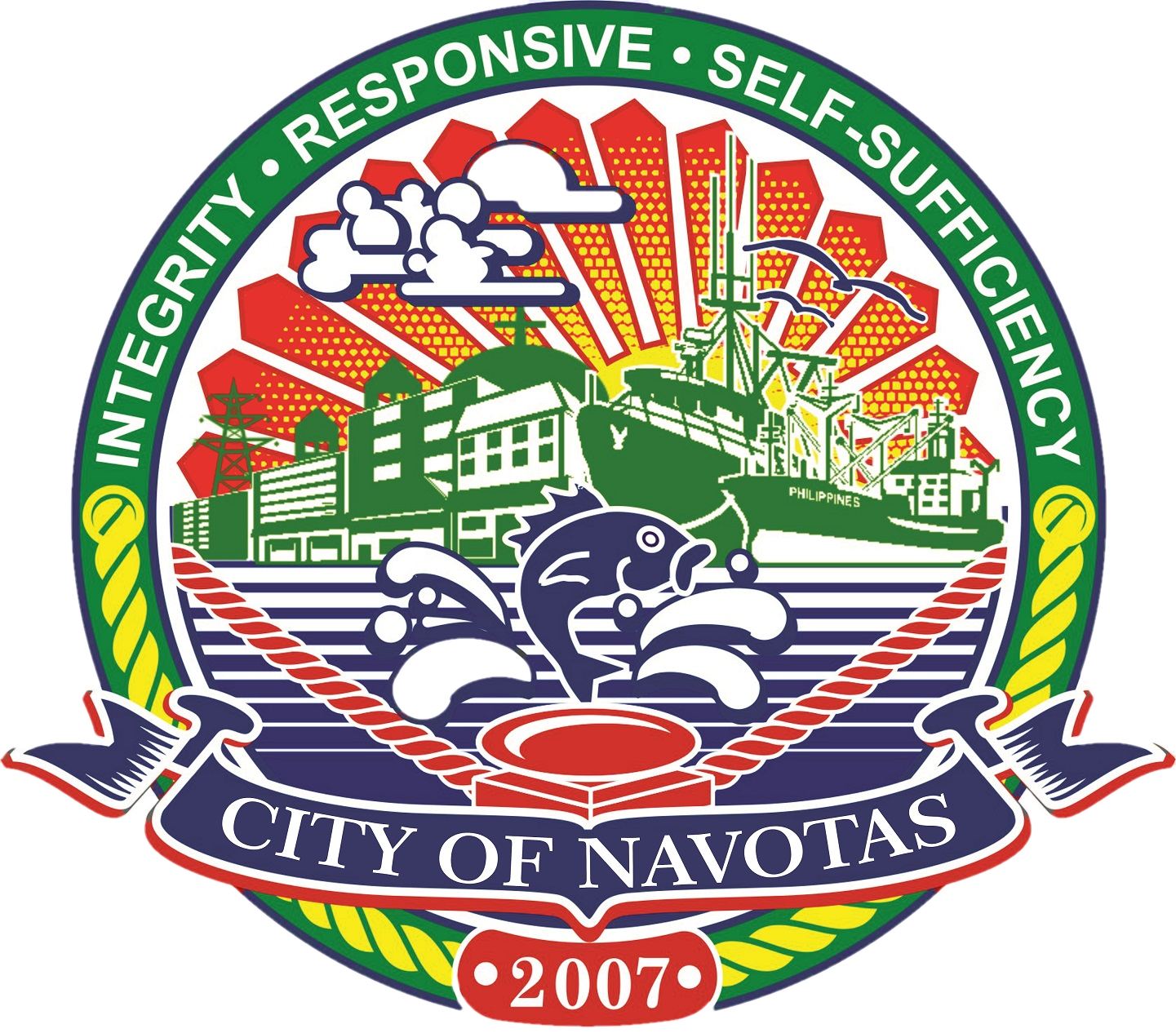
- Seal of the City of Navotas
- Incumbent; John Rey Tiangco since June 30, 2022
- Style: The Honorable
- Seat: Navotas City Hall
- Appointer: Elected via popular vote
- Term length: 3 years, not eligible for re-election immediately after three consecutive terms
- Inaugural holder: Mariano Israel
- Formation: 1859 (as governadorcillo)
- Website: Office of the Mayor of Navotas

The mayor of Navotas (Filipino: Punong Lungsod ng Navotas) is the head of the executive branch of the Navotas's government. The mayor holds office at Navotas City Hall. Like all local government heads in the Philippines, the mayor is elected via popular vote, and may not be elected for a fourth consecutive term (although the former mayor may return to office after an interval of one term). In case of death, resignation or incapacity, the vice mayor becomes the mayor.

== History ==
The mayor of Navotas holds office at the Navotas City Hall.

From its establishment as a town of Manila province in 1859 to 1898, Navotas was led by sixteen (16) governadorcillos. Beginning in 1901, the year when Navotas became part of the newly established province of Rizal, the town was governed by the municipal president, the title first held by Canuto Celestino. From 1903 to 1906, Navotas was placed under the governance of Malabon, which is also led by a municipal president. Benjamín Alonzo was later elected as the then-municipality's first titleholder of mayor in 1934.

During the period of the Philippine Commonwealth from 1935 to 1945, the 1935 constitution ushered. This allowed Navotas to have three (3) leaders. This trend from 1946 to 1972 (during the Second Philippine Republic) was toward decentralization. Congress passed laws giving more autonomy to Local Government Units through the grant of additional powers and lessening of national control affairs. This created four (4) Mayors of Navotas.

During the Martial Law Period, President Ferdinand Marcos had changed the structure and functions of LGU’s, thus decentralization suffered the set back with the concentration of power on his hands. After December 31, 1975 (expiration of tenure of office of the local elective officials), the President assumed the power of appointment of the officials as authorized by the people in a referendum held on February 27, 1975.

== List of leaders ==
=== List of gobernadorcillos (1859–1898) ===
1. Mariano Israel - 1859-1860
2. Baldomero Cacnio - 1861 / 1873-1874 / 1881-1882 / 1885-1886
3. Jose Mariano Oliveros - 1862
4. Andres Pascual - 1863
5. Juan Sioson - 1864-1865
6. Miguel Oliveros - 1866-1867
7. Francisco Oliveros - 1868-1869
8. Eduardo Suarez - 1869-1870
9. Pedro Naval - 1871-1872
10. Natalio Cruz - 1875-1876
11. Domingo Tiangco - 1877-1878
12. Domingo Reyes - 1879-1880 / 1888-1889
13. Cipriano L. San Pedro - 1883-1884
14. Mariano Laiz Oliveros - 1887-1888
15. Mariano Naval - 1890-1891
16. Mateo de Vera - 1892-1898

=== List of municipal president and mayors (1901–present) ===
Municipality of Navotas
#	Image	Name	Deputy (later Vice Mayor)	Term start	Term end
1		Canuto E. Celestino		1901	1903
2		Bernardo Dagala (Note: Municipal president of Malabon after annexation of Navotas)		1903	1905
3		Hermogenes C. Monroy		1905	1907
4		Rufino S. Hernandez		1907	1909
5		Jose R. Pascual		1909	1916
6		Angelo Angeles		1916	1919
7		Arsenio C. Roldan, Sr.		1919	1922
8		Alejandro D. Leongson		1922	1928
9		Angel C. Santiago		1928	1931
10		Alejandro D. Leongson		1931	1934
11		Benjamin A. Alonzo	Lorenzo de Jesus	1934	1937
12		Felix R. Monroy		1937	1946
–		Nemesio L. Angeles		March 1944	September 1944
13		Felix R. Monroy		1944	1946
14		Tomas R. Gomez		1946	1947
15		Pacifico G. Javier Sr.		1948	1951
16		Roberto R. Monroy		1952	1963
17		Felipe C. Del Rosario Sr.		1964	1980
18		Victor B. Javier		1980	1986
19		Felipe Del Rosario Jr.		1986	December 1, 1987
–		Estrella San Juan		December 2, 1987	February 2, 1988
(19)		Felipe Del Rosario Jr.		February 2, 1988	June 30, 1998
20		Cipriano Bautista	Tobias Reynald M. Tiangco	June 30, 1998	May 11, 2000 (Note: Died in office)
21		Tobias Reynald M. Tiangco	Lutgardo Cruz (2000-2004); Patrick Joseph Javier (2004-2007)	May 12, 2000	June 24, 2007
City of Navotas
21		Tobias Reynald M. Tiangco	Patrick Joseph Javier	June 24, 2007	June 30, 2010
22		John Rey Tiangco	Patrick Joseph Javier (2010–2013); Clint Geronimo (2013–2019)	June 30, 2010	June 30, 2019
23		Tobias Reynald M. Tiangco	Clint Geronimo	June 30, 2019	June 30, 2022
24		John Rey Tiangco	Tito Sanchez	June 30, 2022	Incumbent

== Vice Mayor of Navotas ==
The Vice Mayor is the second-highest official of the city. The vice mayor is elected via popular vote; although most mayoral candidates have running mates, the vice mayor is elected separately from the mayor. This can result in the mayor and the vice mayor coming from different political parties.

The Vice Mayor is the presiding officer of the Navotas City Council, although he can only vote as the tiebreaker. When a mayor is removed from office, the vice mayor becomes the mayor until the scheduled next election. The incumbent is Tito Sanchez.

== See also ==
- Navotas
