= Navotas National High School =

Coordinates: 14°39′28″N 120°56′53″E

Navotas National High school
- "Pambansang Mataas na Paaralan ng Navotas"
- Navotas, City; Philippines

Information
- Type: Public
- Established: 1983
- Principal: Maria Cristina A. Robles
- Enrollment: Under 4,500 (2013-2014)
- Campus: Urban
- Color: Red

The Navotas National High School (NNHS) is founded on 1983 by Mayor Victor Javier. With a 2,255 m^{2} (24,270 sq ft) land area, it is located on Barangay Sipac Almacen, Navotas, Metro Manila, Philippines. This school used to be called Navotas Municipal High School.

== See also ==
- Navotas
- Navotas Polytechnic College
