= John Rey Tiangco =

Philippines politician

The Honorable John Rey Tiangco

22nd & 24th Mayor of Navotas
- Incumbent
- Assumed office June 30, 2022
- Vice Mayor: Tito Sanchez
- Preceded by: Toby Tiangco
- In office June 30, 2010 – June 30, 2019
- Vice Mayor: Patrick Joseph Javier (2010–2013); Clint Geronimo (2013–2019)
- Preceded by: Toby Tiangco
- Succeeded by: Toby Tiangco

Member of the Philippine House of Representatives from Navotas
- In office June 30, 2019 – June 30, 2022
- Preceded by: Toby Tiangco
- Succeeded by: Toby Tiangco

Personal details
- Born: John Reynald Marcelo Tiangco; November 21, 1972 (age 53) Ermita, Manila, Philippines
- Party: Partido Navoteño (2010–present)
- Other political affiliations: UNA (c. 2012–2013)
- Spouse: Barbara Pardo (m. 2006)
- Children: 3
- Relatives: Toby Tiangco (brother)
- Occupation: Politician
- Website: johnreytiangco.com

John Reynald Marcelo Tiangco (born November 21, 1972) is a Filipino politician and sports administrator who has served as mayor of Navotas since 2022, having previously held the position from 2010 to 2019. A member of the local Partido Navoteño, Tiangco served as the representative for the lone district of Navotas prior to his return to the city's mayoralty, preceding and succeeding his brother Toby.

He is also the secretary-general of the Philippine Tennis Association.

== Political career ==
=== Mayor of Navotas (2010–2019) ===
==== 2010 election ====
John Rey Tiangco ran unopposed for mayor in the 2010 Navotas local elections for the local party, Partido Navoteño. At the same time, his brother, Tobias "Toby" Tiangco, who had founded the party and had just completed his third term as the mayor of Navotas, ran for a position in the House of Representatives. John Rey became mayor of Navotas on June 30, 2010. Under the slogan "Navotas, NavotaAs! Itaas ang antas ng buhay Navoteño" (English: Raise the standard of life of the people of Navotas), he vowed to prioritize health, education, livelihood, peace and order, and housing projects in Navotas.

==== First term (2010–2013) ====
In cooperation with his brother Tobias, Tiangco made rapid progress with government projects. They announced that the first public hospital in the city would be built, and construction began in August 2014. Housing projects sought to provide relief to those displaced by fires or living in danger zones, and additional pumping stations were established due to the city's flooding problems. In education, Tiangco's administration launched the NavotaAs Scholarship Program, Kindergarten on Wheels (KOW), and Computer Outreach Learning (COOL). Under his administration, CCTVs were installed for public security and additional emergency response vehicles entered service.

==== 2013 election ====
Tiangco was elected to a second term in the 2013 Navotas local elections, with Partido Navoteño securing every seat in the Navotas City Council.

==== Second term (2013–2016) ====
Tiangco's biggest accomplishment during his second term as mayor was the opening of the Navotas City Hospital. Other projects included establishing Navotas Manpower Training Center and Tumana Public Market at Brgy. NBBS Dagat-dagatan, and an additional health center at NBBS Kaunlaran.

==== 2016 election ====
Tiangco ran unopposed in the 2016 elections.

==== Third term as mayor (2016–2019) ====
Under Tiangco's third administration, the city added a hemodialysis unit at Navotas City Hospital. New health facilities, scholarships, housing projects and livelihood programs were established. He initiated drug-rehabilitation program Bidahan.

The NavoBangka program provided free fishing boats to deserving fisherfolk, and a scholarship was provided for the children of fisherfolk as well as athletic and art scholarships, and cash incentives for public school graduates.

Other programs launched during his third term include the Navoteño Film Festival, Avot tour, One on One with Juan, NavoConnect Free Wifi, R10 Family Zone, free birth registration, and a baby care kit for newborns.

==== 2019 election ====
Tiangco ran for the congressional seat for Navotas in the 2019 elections. For this election, Partido Navoteño entered into an alliance with Hugpong ng Pagbabago (HNP), the party of the future Vice President Sara Duterte.

He won and exchanged positions with his brother Toby, who had represented the city for the preceding nine years. John Rey received 80,265 votes compared to his closest opponent, Marielle del Rosario, who received 30,050 votes.

=== Representative (2019–2022) ===
Within the first month of becoming the representative for the Lone District of Navotas, he has already filed House Bills in Congress that will continue to improve the quality of life of Navoteños. One of these bills is HB No. 876 or LRT Extension Act that extends the LRT Line 1 from Monumento in Caloocan to Navotas to make the city more accessible to people. He has also filed HB No. 877 or the Teachers Incentives Act that aims to increase salaries of public school teachers and non-teaching personnel, in addition to giving them incentives.

He served for one term during the 18th Congress.

==== Committee Vice-Chairmanships ====
- Banks And Financial Intermediaries
- Transportation

==== House Bills Authored ====
- HB No. 876 - LRT 1 Extension Act
- HB No. 877 - Teachers Incentives Act
- HB No. 875 - Navotas Fish Port Complex Modernization and Rehabilitation Act
- HB No. 874 - Barangay Health Workers Act
- HB No. 874 - Fisherfolk Livelihood Act

=== Mayor of Navotas (2022–present) ===
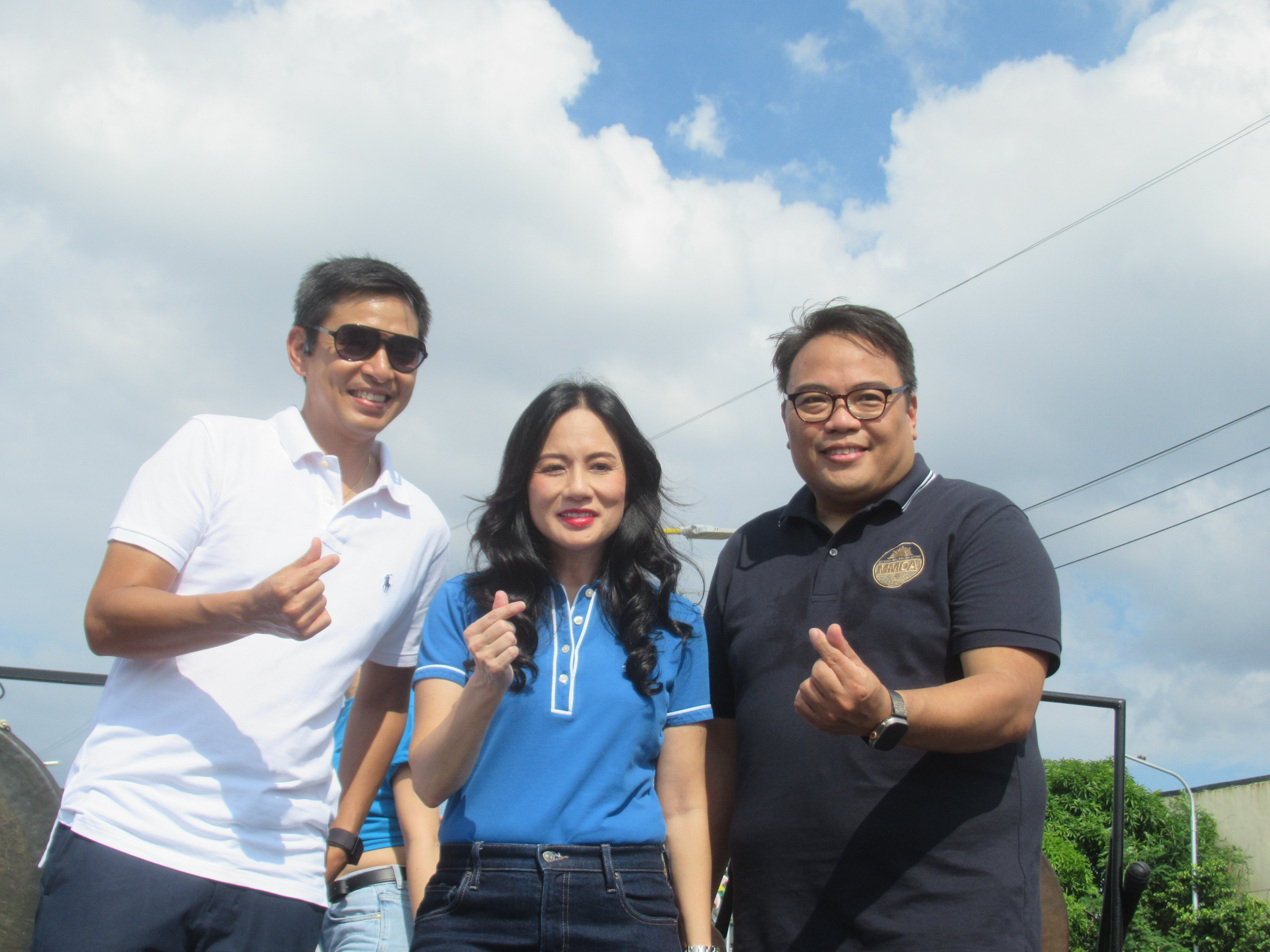
Tiangco (left) with Malabon mayor Jeannie Sandoval (center) and MMDA chair Romando S. Artes (right) during the 2023 Metro Manila Film Festival Parade of Stars on December 16, 2023.

Tiangco ran for mayor of Navotas in 2022, switching places with his brother Toby once again, under Partido Navoteño. He eventually won the elections, earning his fourth nonconsecutive term as mayor. He received 80,908 votes over his closest opponent, RC Cruz of Aksyon, who received 44,970 votes.

== Other endeavors ==
Tiangco is the secretary-general of the Philippine Tennis Association. He helped plan and organize the Philippine Women's Open, the first-ever WTA event in the Philippines.

== Awards and recognitions ==
Tiangco has been recognized with:

- Bronze Seal of Good Housekeeping (2011)
- Silver Seal of Good Housekeeping (2012)
- Seal of Good Local Governance (2015 & 2017)
- Seal of Child-Friendly City (2016)
- Commission on Audit (COA) Unqualified Opinion (2016, 2017 & 2018)
- NCR Top 1, 2017 BLGF Collection Target for Receipts from Economic Enterprises
- NCR Top 2, 2017 BLGF Collection Target for Total Local Revenues
- 2017 Timely and Accurate Submission of Electronic Statement of Receipts and Expenditures
- Galing Pook Award (2018)
- Seal of Good Education Governance (2018)
- National Anti-Drug Abuse Council Performance Award (2018)
- Most Outstanding Accounting Office (2018)

== Political controversies ==
Controversy arose in July 2011 when a private organization filed a case with the Ombudsman of the Philippines against many prominent figures in the Navotas government for violating Republic Act 3019 (the Anti-Graft and Corrupt Practices Law). The individuals involved include Tiangco, his brother Tobias, vice mayor P. J. Javier, and every member of the city council. They were accused of approving a city resolution that would cause "automatic withdrawal of the recognition and acknowledgement" of the complainant, resulting in significant negative impacts.
