= Navotas Polytechnic College =

Public college in Navotas, Philippines

- Politeknikong Kolehiyo ng Navotas (Filipino)
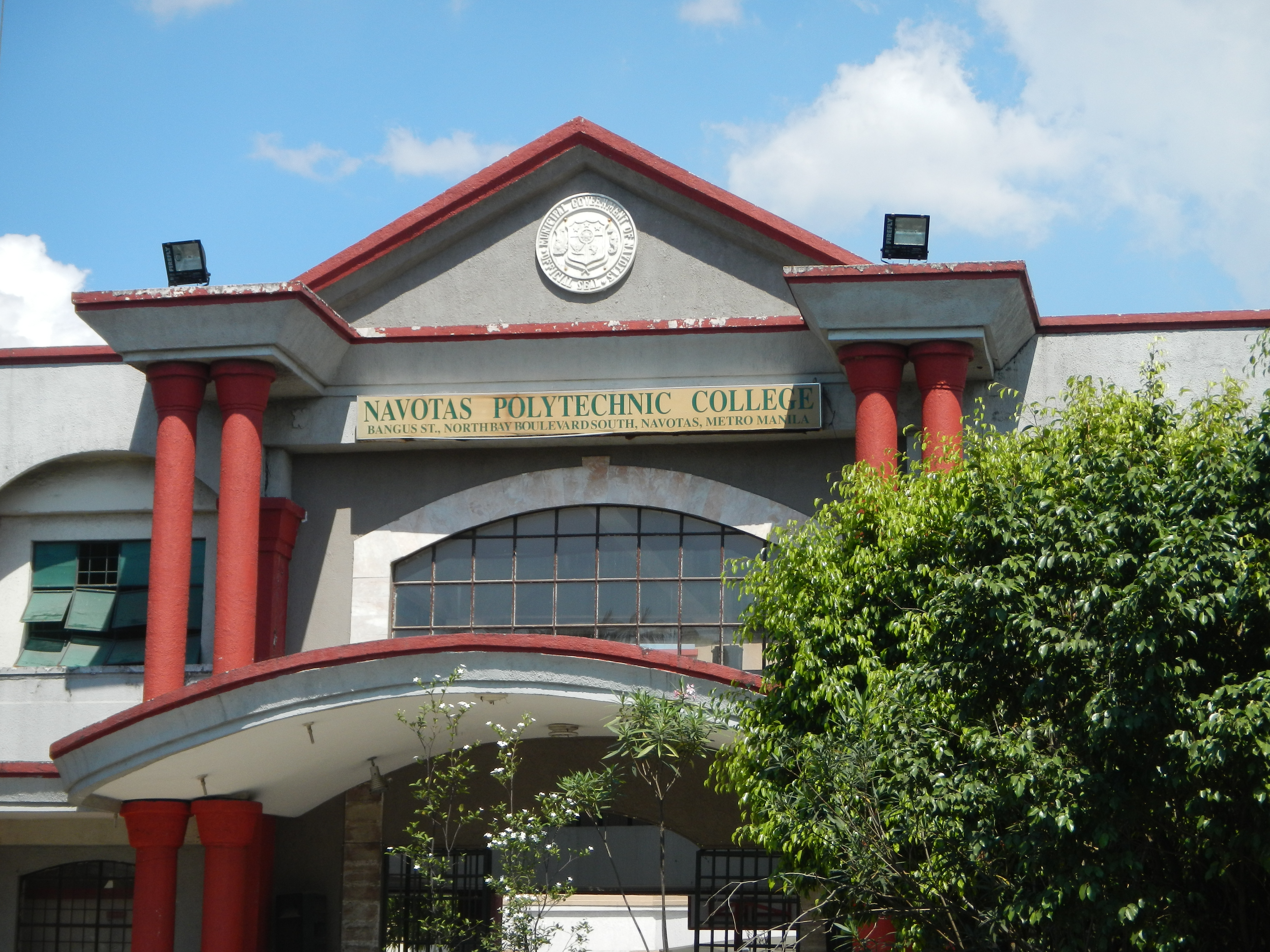
- Motto: "Quality, Dependability, Integrity"
- Type: Public Local college
- Established: May 18, 1994; 32 years ago
- Academic affiliations: ALCU
- President: Ms. Francisca S. Roque
- Students: over 4,000 First Semester (2011–2012)
- Location: Kapitbahayan Multi-Purpose Hall, North Bay Boulevard South Kaunlaran, Navotas, Metro Manila, Philippines; 14°38′42″N 120°57′25″E
- Campus: Urban
- Colors: Red
- Nickname: The NPCians
- Website: www.npc.edu.ph
- Location in Metro Manila Location in Luzon Location in the Philippines

The Navotas Polytechnic College also referred to by its acronym NPC, is a public, non-sectarian, coeducational higher education institution run by the city government of Navotas in Navotas City, Metro Manila, Philippines. It was founded in 1994 by virtue of Municipal Ordinance (M.O). No. 94-06 of the Municipal Council of Navotas (now City of Navotas), which was signed on May 18, 1994.

At present NPC offers degree programs in business administration, education, computer technology, short-term courses.

== History ==
The Navotas Polytechnic College was established by virtue of Municipal Ordinance (M.O). No. 94-06 of the Municipal Council of Navotas (now City of Navotas), which was signed on May 18, 1994.

The primary goal of the college is to give opportunity to the poor but deserving students of Navotas, to allow them to pursue tertiary education and acquire knowledge and skills through excellence in academic and technological courses.

== Education ==
=== College of Education ===
- Bachelor in Elementary Education (BEED), area of concentration: General Education
- Bachelor of Secondary Education (BSED), majors in Mathematics; English

=== College of Business Administration ===
Bachelor of Science in Business Major in:

- Management Accounting (BSBAMA)
- Management (BSBA)
- Marketing Management (BSBA MKTGMGT)
- Human Resource Development Management (BSBAHRDM)

=== College of Computer Studies ===
- Bachelor of Science in Computer Science

=== Short-term courses ===
- Associate in Computer Secretarial (ACS)
- Computer Systems Programming (CSP)
- Computer Systems and Network Technician (CSNT)

== Student organizations ==
- Reserve Officers Training Corps Alumni Association headed by Marvin Linatoc
- Junior Philippine Institute of Accountants (JPIA)
- United Business Administration Society (UBAS)
- Integrated Computer Society (ICS)
- The Torch (beed-torch)
- The Bosses (bsed-bosses)
- The TOFAZ (acs-ascsec- OFFAD)

== Publication ==
Katig is the newspaper published by the Student Publication Organization with the help of Ms. Ellen Carlos through the College Administration Office. Katig gathers news stories that concern the NPC community. The Katig — contributed to by the schools offices and colleges — can be about major events, improvements to NPC's physical and academic features, information link between and among students and sectors of the college. It tackles local and national issues, as well.
