= Navotas City Council =

City Council of Navotas Sangguniang Panglunsod ng Navotas

Type
- Type: Unicameral
- Term limits: 3 terms (9 years)

Leadership
- Presiding Officer: Tito Sanchez, Navoteño since June 30, 2025

Structure
- Seats: 14 councilors
- Political groups: Navoteño (14)
- Length of term: 3 years
- Authority: Navotas City Charter; Local Government Code of the Philippines

Elections
- Voting system: Plurality-at-large voting
- Last election: May 13, 2025
- Next election: May 8, 2028

Meeting place
- Navotas City Hall

Website
- Navotas Government Official Website

The Navotas City Council is Navotas's Sangguniang Panlungsod or legislature. It is composed of 14 councilors, with six councilors elected from each of Navotas' two councilor districts and two councilors elected from the ranks of barangay (neighborhood) chairmen and the Sangguniang Kabataan (SK; youth councils). The presiding officer of the council is the Vice Mayor, who is elected citywide.

== Membership ==
Each of Navotas' two councilor districts elects six councilors to the council. In plurality-at-large voting, a voter may vote up to six candidates, with the candidates having the six highest number of votes being elected. In addition, the barangay chairmen and the SK chairmen throughout the city elect amongst themselves their representatives to the council. Hence, there are 14 councilors.

City council elections are synchronized with other elections in the country. Elections are held every first Monday of May every third year since 1992.

=== Current members ===
As the presiding officer, the Vice Mayor can only vote to break ties.

The parties as stated in the 2025 election.

==== 1st District ====
Barangays: Bagumbayan North, Bagumbayan South, Bangkulasi, Navotas East, Navotas West, North Bay Boulevard North, NBBS Proper, NBBS Kaunlaran, NBBS Dagat-dagatan, San Rafael Village, Sipac-Almacen

- Edgardo Maño (Navoteño)
- Reynaldo Monroy (Navoteño)
- Anna Victoria Nazal-Cabrera (Navoteño)
- Mylene Sanchez (Navoteño)
- Lance Angelo Santiago (Navoteño)
- Arvie John Vicencio (Navoteño)

==== 2nd District ====
Barangays: Daanghari, San Jose, San Roque, Tangos North, Tangos South, Tanza 1, Tanza 2

- Clint Geronimo (Navoteño)
- Emil Justin Angelo Gino-gino (Navoteño)
- Analiza Lupisan (Navoteño)
- Ron Hansel Miguel Naval (Navoteño)
- Cesar Justine Santos (Navoteño)
- Rochelle Vicencio (Navoteño)
