= Legislative districts of Navotas =

Legislative district of the Philippines

The legislative districts of Navotas are the representations of the highly urbanized city of Navotas in the Congress of the Philippines. The city is currently represented in the lower house of the Congress through its lone congressional district.

== History ==
Navotas was represented as part of the at-large district of the province of Manila in the Malolos Congress from 1898 to 1899, the first district of Rizal from 1907 to 1941 and from 1945 to 1972, the at-large district of Rizal in the National Assembly of the Second Philippine Republic from 1943 to 1944, and the representation of Region IV in the Interim Batasang Pambansa from 1978 to 1984. From 1984 to 1986, Navotas was grouped together with Malabon and Valenzuela as the legislative district of Malabon–Navotas–Valenzuela for representation in the Regular Batasang Pambansa. From 1987 to 2010, it was represented with Malabon as the legislative district of Malabon–Navotas. The two cities were separated per the provision in the city charter of Navotas (Republic Act No. 9387) that was approved on March 10, 2007 and ratified on June 24, 2007.

== Current districts ==
Partido Navoteño (1)

Legislative Districts and Congressional Representatives of Navotas City
District	Current Representative	Constituent(s)	Population (2020)
Lone	Tobias "Toby" Tiangco (since 2022); Navotas West	List: Bagumbayan North; Bagumbayan South; Bangkulasi; Daang Hari; North Bay Boulevard North; NBBS Dagat-dagatan; NBBS Kaunlaran; NBBS Proper; Navotas West; Navotas East; Sipac-Almacen; San Rafael Village; San Jose; San Roque; Tangos North; Tangos South; Tanza 1; Tanza 2	247,543
