= Partido Navoteño =

Political party in the Philippines

- President: Toby Tiangco
- Chairman: John Rey Tiangco
- Secretary-General: Clint Geronimo
- Founded: 2004
- Headquarters: Navotas
- Ideology: Conservatism; Social conservatism Populism; Localism
- Political position: Centre-right
- National affiliation: HNP (2018–2021); UNA (2012–2016); NPC (2004–2012)
- Colors: Green
- Slogan: Itaas ang antas ng Buhay Navoteño. (Increase the level of the Navoteño's Life.)
- House of Representatives: 1 / 1 (Navotas seats only)
- Local councils: 12 / 12

Partido Navoteño is the ruling political party in the city of Navotas, Philippines, founded by Toby Tiangco in 2004. It was previously a local affiliate of the NPC, United Nationalist Alliance, and Hugpong ng Pagbabago. The party currently controls all major political offices in the city.

== Electoral performance ==
=== Mayor ===
Election	Candidate	Number of votes	Share of votes	Outcome of election
2010	John Rey Tiangco	76,158	100%	Unopposed
2013	Supported John Rey Tiangco who won			
2016	John Rey Tiangco	87,485	95.66%	Won
2019	Toby Tiangco	79,262	68.82%	Won
2022	John Rey Tiangco	77,571	64.29%	Won
2025	John Rey Tiangco	120,283	100.00%	Unopposed

=== Vice mayor ===
Election	Candidate	Number of votes	Share of votes	Outcome of election
2010	Patrick John Javier	73,576	100%	Unopposed
2013	Supported Clint Geronimo who won			
2016	Clint Geronimo	79,753	100%	Unopposed
2019	Supported Clint Geronimo who won			
2022	Tito Sanchez	80,771	72.48%	Won
2025	Tito Sanchez	110,981	100.00%	Unopposed

=== House of Representatives ===
Election	Seats allocated for Navotas	Outcome of election
2010	1 / 1	Joined the independent bloc
2013	0 / 1	Members participated under UNA
2016	0 / 1	Members participated under UNA
2019	1 / 1	Joined the majority bloc
2022	1 / 1	Joined the majority bloc
2025	1 / 1	Joined the majority bloc

=== City council ===
Election	Number of votes	Share of votes	Seats	Outcome of election
2010	300,363	70.8%	9 / 12	Majority
2013	Members participated under UNA			
2016	365,171	83.89%	11 / 12	Majority
2019	210,999	36.96%	7 / 12	Majority
2022	721,497	80.38%	12 / 12	Majority
2025	523,032	92.79%	12 / 12	Majority
