= Toby Tiangco =

Filipino politician (born 1967)

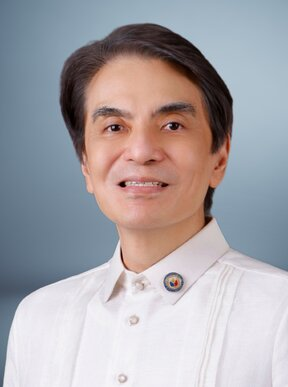
- Official portrait, 2025

Member of the House of Representatives from Navotas' district
- Incumbent
- Assumed office June 30, 2022
- Preceded by: John Rey Tiangco
- In office June 30, 2010 – June 30, 2019
- Preceded by: District established
- Succeeded by: John Rey Tiangco

21st & 23rd Mayor of Navotas
- In office June 30, 2019 – June 30, 2022
- Vice Mayor: Clint Geronimo
- Preceded by: John Rey Tiangco
- Succeeded by: John Rey Tiangco
- In office May 12, 2000 – June 30, 2010
- Vice Mayor: Lutgardo Cruz (2000–2004); Patrick Joseph Javier (2004–2010)
- Preceded by: Cipriano Bautista
- Succeeded by: John Rey Tiangco
- Acting (Note: Tiangco became acting mayor as incumbent mayor, Cipriano Bautista was subject to an electoral protest.)
- In office June 30, 1998 – February 1, 1999

Vice Mayor of Navotas
- In office June 1, 1998 – May 12, 2000
- Mayor: Felipe Del Rosario Jr. Cipriano Bautista
- Succeeded by: Lutgardo Cruz

Personal details
- Born: Tobias Reynald Marcelo Tiangco; November 21, 1967 (age 58) Manila, Philippines
- Party: Navoteño (2004–present)
- Other political affiliations: UNA (2012–2016); PMP (2009–2012); NPC (2001–2009)
- Spouse: Michelle Romuáldez-Yap
- Relations: John Rey Tiangco (brother)
- Children: 1
- Education: Ateneo de Manila University (BS)
- Occupation: Politician
- Profession: Businessman
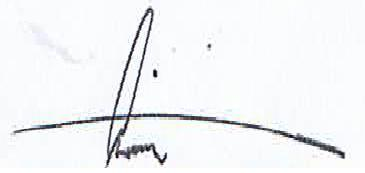
- Signature
- Website: toby-tiangco.com

Tobias Reynald "Toby" Marcelo Tiangco (born November 21, 1967) is a Filipino businessman and politician currently serving as the representative of Navotas' lone district since 2022, a position he previously held from 2010 to 2019. He was also the Mayor of Navotas for multiple terms.

== Early life and education ==
Tiangco was born into a middle-class family on November 21, 1967, in Manila. He is the son of Chinese mestizo Restituto B. Tiangco and Erlinda Marcelo de Tiangco. His father is a second cousin of the broadcaster Mel Tiangco. He helped his parents by working at the early age with his brother, John Rey.

Tiangco attended primary and secondary education at Xavier School in San Juan and later graduated with a Bachelor's degree in Management from Ateneo de Manila University in 1989.

== Business career ==
He worked as the Assistant Operation Manager at the Engineering & Maintenance Department of Trans-Pacific Journey Fishing Corporation from 1991 to 1994 and was promoted to General Manager in 1994 and Executive Vice President in 1996. Tiangco also worked as the chief executive officer of Pacific Tomich Corporation.

== Political career ==
=== Vice Mayor of Navotas (1998; 1999–2000) ===
Tiangco first sat as the vice mayor of the then-municipality of Navotas in early 1998. On June 30, 1998, Tiangco ascended as mayor due to an electoral protest against Mayor Cipriano Bautista but became vice-mayor again on February 1, 1999.

=== Mayor of Navotas (2000–2010) ===
On May 12, 2000, Mayor Cipriano Bautista died, resulting in Tiangco's second accession as mayor until June 30, 2001. Tiangco ran for a fresh term with running mate Lutgardo Cruz, but Patrick Joseph Javier, an independent, won the vice-mayoral seat.

In 2004, Navotas was awarded as the “Cleanest Municipality of NCR”, and Tiangco remained mayor of Navotas until 2010. He also founded Partido Navoteño in the same year. He focused on the issues of garbage, and the beatification of Navotas City Hall. In 2007, Navotas was converted into a city, resulting in Tiangco becoming the first City Mayor. His brother John Rey succeeded him following the 2010 elections.

=== Congressman (2010–2019) ===
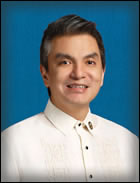
Official portrait of Rep. Tiangco during the 16th Congress

Tiangco ran for Congress unopposed and assumed office on June 30, 2010, as the first representative of Navotas's at-large congressional district. As congressman, he gave scholarships to 900 Navoteños, and ensured free medical treatment major hospitals with his Medical Assistance Ordinance. He also initiated subsidized housing projects in Barangay Tanza.

In 2012, Tiangco served as a state witness at the impeachment trial of Supreme Court Chief Justice Renato Corona. Corona ended up being impeached and removed from office.

Tiangco joined United Nationalist Alliance (UNA) and later became party president. In 2013, he sought for a second term and won with 70.05% of votes, defeating Rico de Guzmán, a former balút vendor.

Tiangco ran for a third and final term in 2016 and won. In July 2016, Tiangco left and resigned as party president of UNA over a House minority leadership row and became part of the independent minority in the House of Representatives until his term ended in 2019.

=== Mayor of Navotas (2019–2022) ===
Being barred for reelection in congress, he ran for Mayor of Navotas in 2019. He was successful, defeating 2nd district councilor Dan Israel Ang by a wide margin. Tiangco succeeded his younger brother, John Rey, who in turn took his vacated seat as representative for the lone district of Navotas. He was in-charge of the Navotas city government during the COVID-19 pandemic. He donated his salary from April 2020 to the end of his term in June 2022 worth almost ₱3.3 million to families who are not part of the national government's emergency subsidy program.

=== Congressman (2022–present) ===
Tiangco once again ran for Congressman and switched places with his brother John Rey in 2022 and elected in a landslide victory. In 2024, he became the campaign manager of the Alyansa para sa Bagong Pilipinas coalition ahead of the 2025 elections.

== Personal life ==
Tiangco married Michelle Yap y Romuáldez and together they have a son Tommy Tiangco.
