= Clint Geronimo =

Filipino politician

Vice Mayor of Navotas
- In office June 30, 2013 – June 30, 2022
- Mayor: John Rey Tiangco (2013–2019); Toby Tiangco (2019–2022)
- Preceded by: Patrick Joseph Javier
- Succeeded by: Tito Sanchez

Member of the Navotas City Council from the 2nd district
- Incumbent
- Assumed office June 30, 2022
- In office June 30, 2007 – June 30, 2013

Personal details
- Born: Clint Nicholas Baltazar Geronimo; December 6, 1984 (age 41) Navotas, Philippines
- Party: Partido Navoteño (2010–present)
- Other political affiliations: PDP-Laban (2019–2021); UNA (2013–2016)
- Occupation: Politician

Clint Nicholas Baltazar Geronimo is a Filipino politician who currently serves as a councilor of Navotas from the 2nd district since 2022, a position he previously from 2007 to 2013. He previously served as the Vice Mayor of Navotas from 2013 to 2022. He is also a former chairman of Navotas's SK Federation and the former National Vice Chairman of SK Federation of the Philippines.
