= Navotas =

Highly urbanized city in Metro Manila, Philippines

- Highly urbanized city
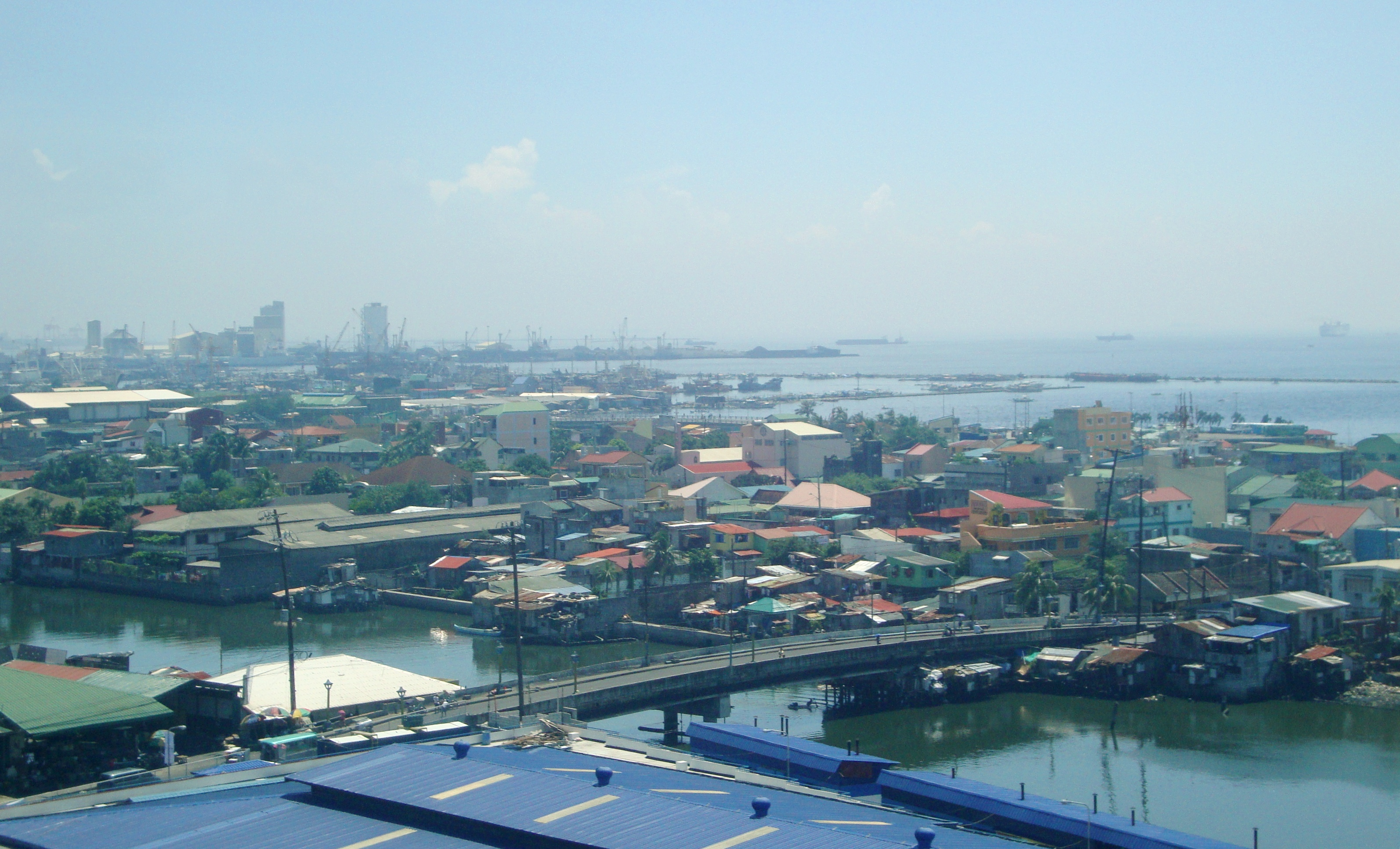
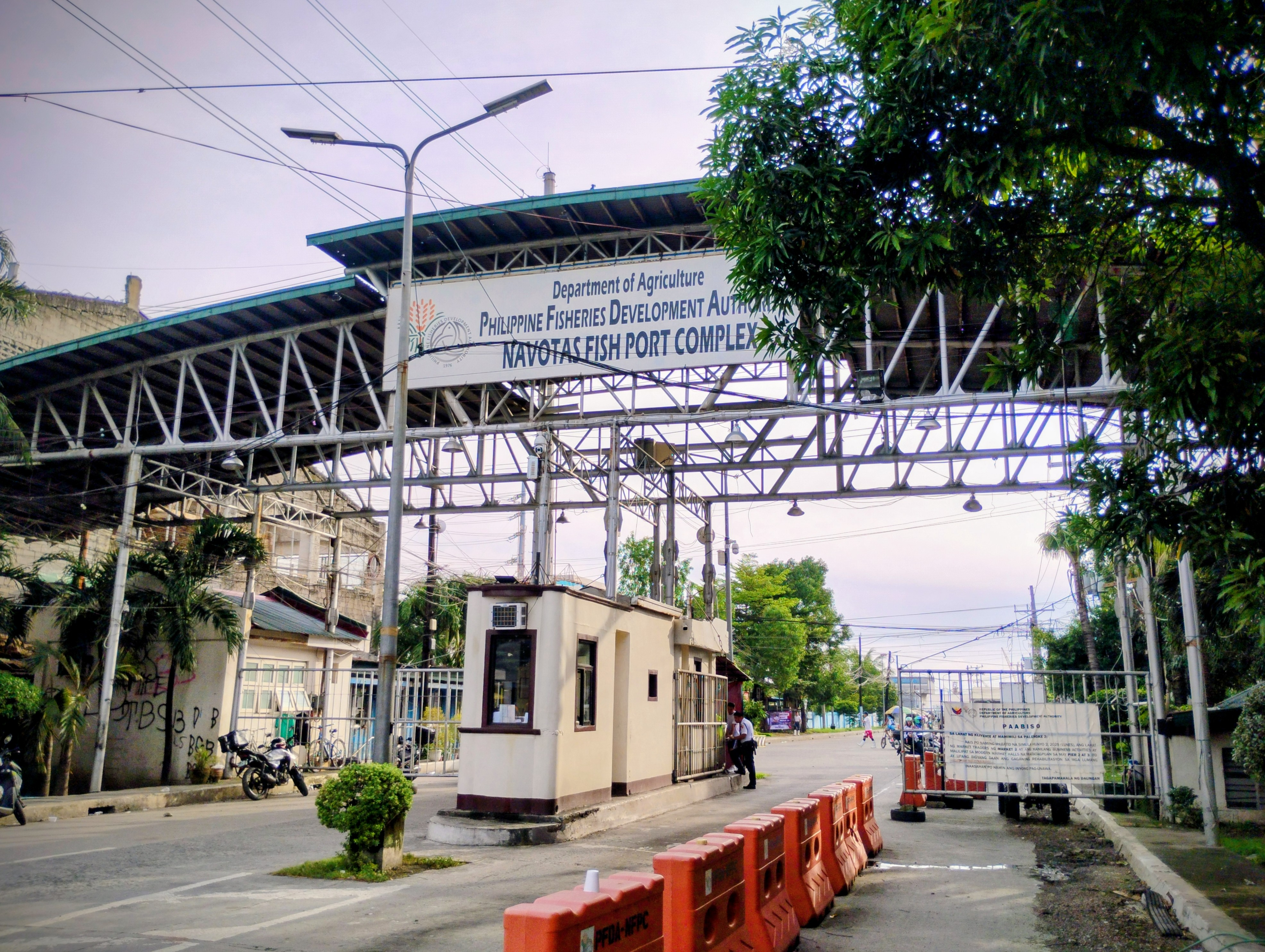
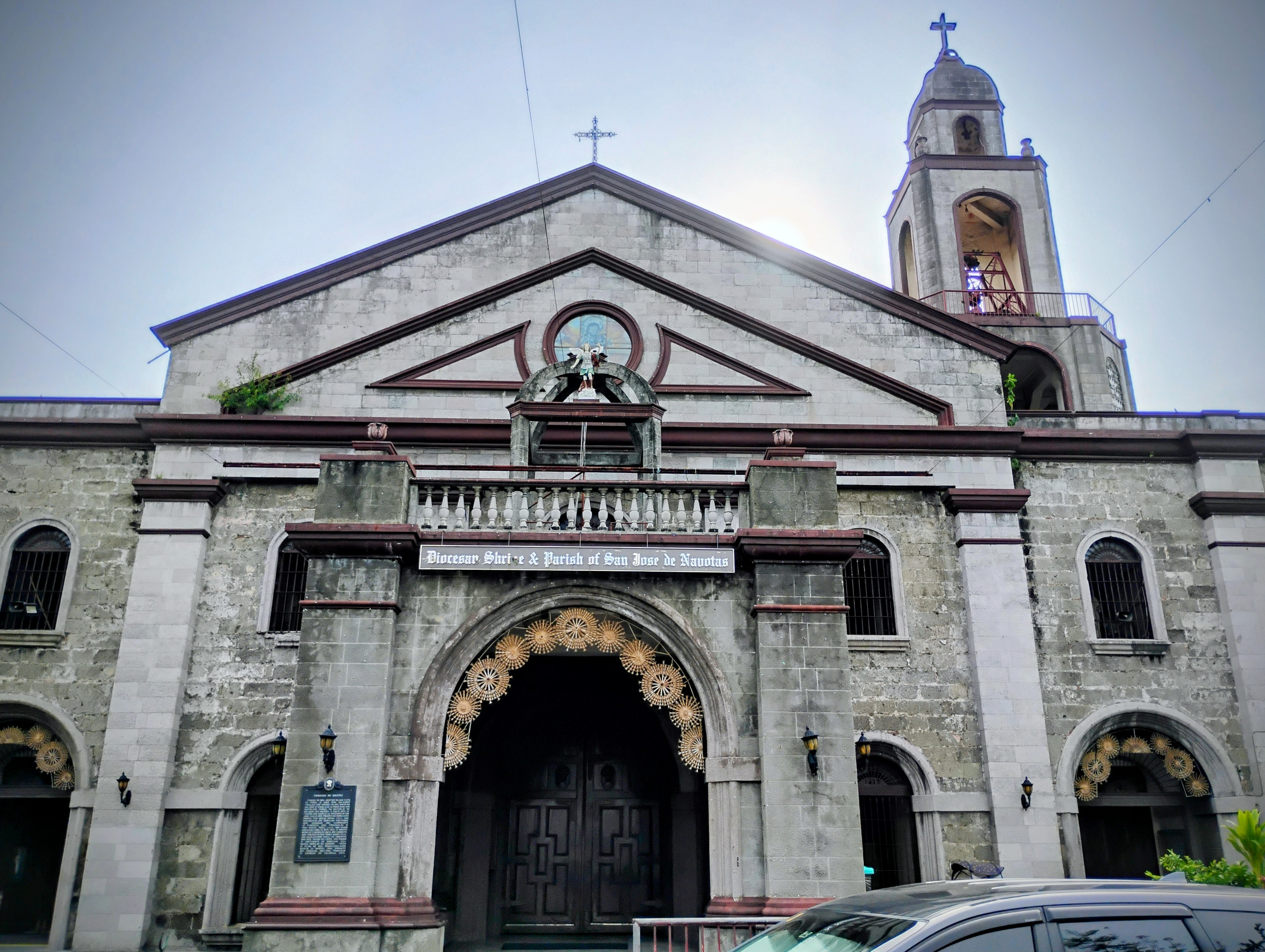
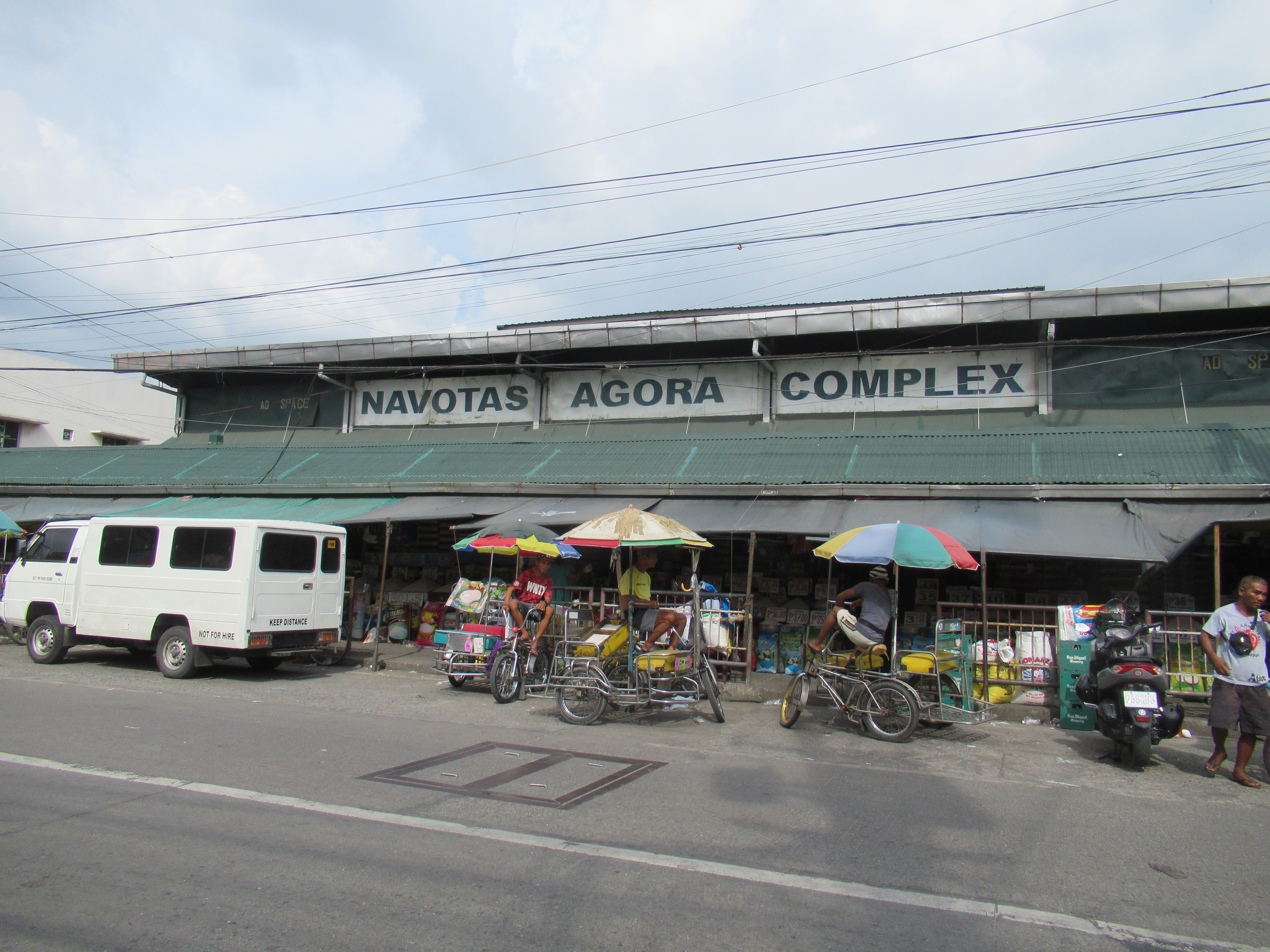
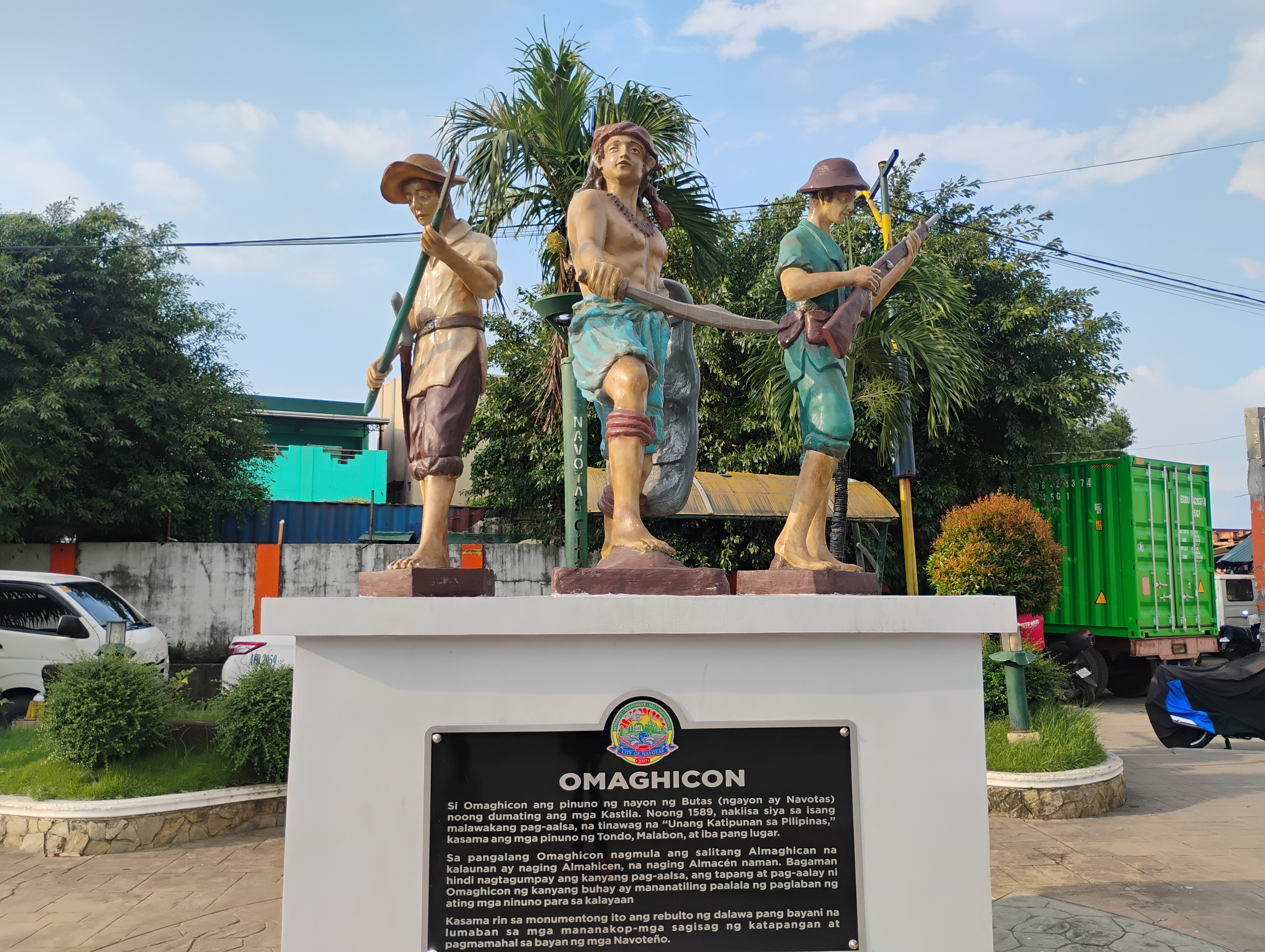
- Clockwise starting from the top: Aerial view of Navotas, Diocesan Shrine and Parish of San Jose de Navotas, Navotas City Hall, Omaghicon Monument, Navotas Agora Complex, Navotas Fish Port Complex

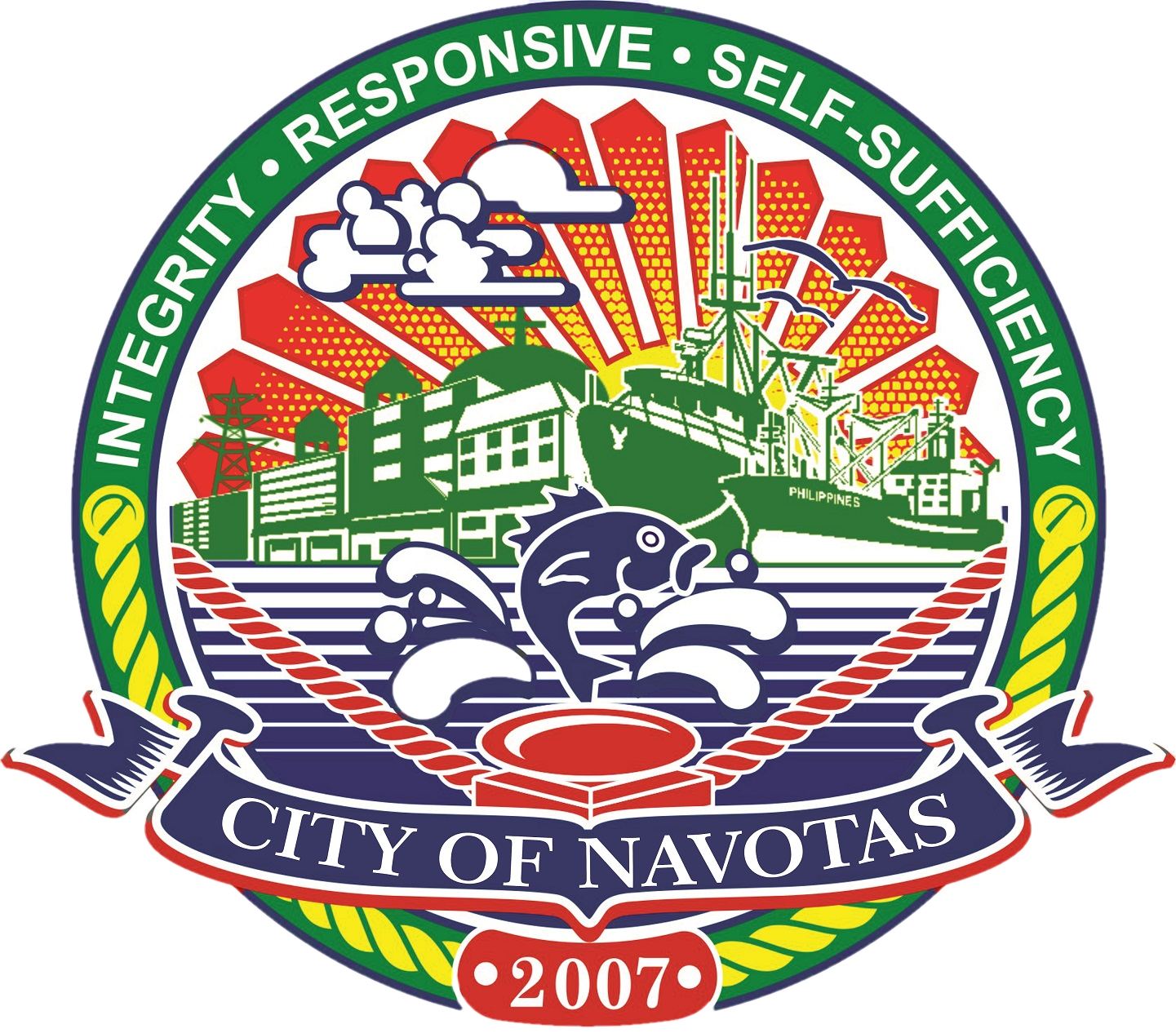
- Seal
- Nickname: Commercial Fishing Hub of the Philippines
- Motto: Itaas ang antas ng Buhay-Navoteño (Raise the Level of the Navoteño Life)
- Anthem: Himno ng Navotas; English: Navotas Hymn
- Map of Metro Manila with Navotas highlighted
- Interactive map of Navotas
- Location within the Philippines
- Coordinates: 14°40′00″N 120°56′30″E
- Country: Philippines
- Region: Metro Manila
- Province: none
- District: Lone district
- Founded: February 16, 1859
- Annexation to Malabon: October 12, 1903
- Chartered: January 16, 1906
- Cityhood and HUC: June 24, 2007
- Barangays: 18 (see Barangays)

Government
  - Type: Sangguniang Panlungsod
  - Mayor: John Reynald M. Tiangco (NVTEÑO)
  - Vice Mayor: Tito M. Sanchez (NVTEÑO)
  - Representative: Tobias Reynald M. Tiangco (NVTEÑO)
  - Councilors: List: 1st District; • Edgardo Maño; • Reynaldo Monroy; • Alvin Jason S. Nazal; • Richard San Juan; • Lance Angelo Santiago; • Arvie John Vicencio; • 2nd District; • Neil Adrian Cruz; • Clint Nicolas Geronimo; • Emil Justin Angelo Gino-gino; • Analiza Lupisan; • Ron Hansel Miguel Naval; • Cesar Justine Santos; Liga ng mga Barangay President; • Rochelle Vicencio; Sangguniang Kabataan Federation President; • Jodile Cañete
  - Electorate: 157,065 voters (2025)

Area
  - Total: 8.94 km^{2} (3.45 sq mi)
  - Rank: 144th out of 145
- Elevation: 19 m (62 ft)
- Highest elevation: 263 m (863 ft)
- Lowest elevation: −3 m (−9.8 ft)

Population (2024 census)
  - Total: 252,878
  - Density: 28,300/km^{2} (73,300/sq mi)
  - Households: 63,167
- Demonym(s): Navoteño; Navoteña

Economy
  - Income class: 1st city income class
  - Poverty incidence: 3.9% (2023)
  - Revenue: ₱ 2,125 million (2024)
  - Assets: ₱ 6,179 million (2024)
  - Expenditure: ₱ 2,212 million (2024)
  - Liabilities: ₱ 1,534 million (2024)

Service provider
  - Electricity: Manila Electric Company (Meralco)
- Time zone: UTC+8 (PST)
- PSGC: 137503000
- IDD : area code: +63 (0)2
- Native languages: Filipino
- Website: www.navotas.gov.ph

Navotas, officially the City of Navotas (Filipino: Lungsod ng Navotas), is a highly urbanized city in the National Capital Region of the Philippines. According to the 2024 census, it has a population of 252,878 people.

It was formerly part of the Province of Rizal in southern Luzon. It comprises what is known as the CAMANAVA area along with the cities of Caloocan, Malabon, and Valenzuela.

It is known as the Commercial Fishing Hub of the Philippines, for the city has the third largest fish port in Asia and the largest in Southeast Asia. Although it was established on February 16, 1859, Navotas celebrates its foundation day every January 16, the day in 1906 when it finally separated from Malabon. Navotas became a highly urbanized city on June 24, 2007.

== Etymology ==
Navotas was once part of Malabon. According to one legend, the long and narrow delta extended unbroken from north to south along the seashore. The strip of land between the former district of Tondo, Manila and this town was eaten away by the sea until an opening was made. Water began to flow through the opening. The geographical change prompted the people to refer to the place as "butas", "nayon ng butas", or "nabutas", a Tagalog word that means breached or pierced through. What began as a natural channel developed into a regular waterway, now known as the Navotas River. In later years, the place came to be known as "Nabotas", then "Navotas".

It was also known as Hacienda de Navotas. It was once owned by the Dominican friars until it was sold to the Pascual family during the early days of the American regime and developed into a residential estate.

San José de Navotas was the name given to the locality after its patron saint, Saint Joseph. On June 11, 1859, a Superior Decreto established a new parish and municipality under the supervision of Friar Matías Navoa. The populace was divided into two distinct groups, the naturales (locals) and the mestizos. Mariano Estrellas was the gobernadorcillo (petty governor) of the naturales and Mariano Israel, of the mestizos. Today, because records are incomplete, recognition is only given to the gobernadorcillos for the mestizos. A school in honor of San Jose was built and known as "San José Academy."

== History ==
All that I have above related having taken place, it was decided to make peace with the nearest villages, some of whom had come to beg it from the governor, and others would not. Among those who would not come was a village called Butas, situated on an inlet on the other side of the river flowing past Manilla, and about a league and a half away. This village, uniting with the others near by, sent word that they did not wish peace or friendship with the governor; and had the boldness to come as far as the village of Alcandora [ie Lakandula], quite close to Manilla, whence they sent defiance to the governor and the captains.

— Unknown writer, Relation on Conquest of the Island of Luzon (1572)

=== Spanish colonial era ===
The movement for the separation of barangays San José de Navotas and Bangkulasi from Tambobong (now Malabon), then a town in the province of Tondo (later Manila), began on December 20, 1827. Led by the principales and village leaders, such separation was petitioned before the Spanish colonial government when the locals experienced difficulties in doing business transactions and accessing Tambobong's población across what is now the Navotas River for religious events.

On February 16, 1859, the petition was finally granted, separating both barrios from Tambobong to form a new distinct town. The town initially composed of four barrios (villages): San José, Tangos, Bangkulasi, and Tanza. Later on June 11, the Real Audiencia of Manila enacted a Superior Decreto, which established the San José de Navotas Parish with a church and parochial school.

On August 6, 1898, Navotas joined the revolutionary government of General Emilio Aguinaldo.

=== American occupation ===
On June 11, 1901, Navotas was eventually incorporated into the newly created province of Rizal with the enactment of Act No. 137.

On October 12, 1903, the town was returned to Malabon by virtue of Act No. 942. On January 16, 1906, Navotas regained its independent municipality status with the enactment of Act No. 1442 which separated it from Malabon.

=== Philippine independence ===
On November 7, 1975, Navotas was transferred from the province of Rizal to the newly formed National Capital Region or Metro Manila, by virtue of Presidential Decree No. 824.

=== Cityhood ===
On June 24, 2007, Navotas became a highly urbanized city by virtue of Republic Act No. 9387 dated March 10, 2007, after a plebiscite was conducted.

=== Navotas landfill fire ===
A fire broke out at the Navotas Sanitary Landfill on April 10, 2026 lasting at least three weeks.

== Geography ==
=== Topography ===
Navotas is a coastal town in the northwest part of Metro Manila. It is a narrow strip of land with an aggregated shoreline of approximately 4.5 kilometers (2.8 mi). It is bordered on the north by Obando, Bulacan along Sukol Creek which separates it from Isla Pulo; on the south by the city of Manila; on the east by the cities of Malabon and Caloocan and bodies of water such as Binuangan River, the Daang Cawayan River, the Dampalit River, the Batasan River, the Navotas River, the Bangculasi Channel, the Malabon Channel and the Estero de Maypajo; and on the west by Manila Bay. Islands encompassed by the city include Navotas Island, where the city proper is located, and Isla Pulo.

Land reclamation, which includes the Navotas Fish Port Complex, had increased the city's land area. Projects such as the Navotas Boulevard Business Park and the Navotas Fish Port Complex expansion by the Philippine Fisheries Development Authority are expected to add up to 680 hectares (1,700 acres) to the city's land area.

=== Climate ===
Climate data for Navotas
Month	Jan	Feb	Mar	Apr	May	Jun	Jul	Aug	Sep	Oct	Nov	Dec	Year
Mean daily maximum °C (°F)	29 (84)	30 (86)	32 (90)	34 (93)	33 (91)	31 (88)	30 (86)	29 (84)	29 (84)	30 (86)	30 (86)	29 (84)	31 (87)
Mean daily minimum °C (°F)	20 (68)	20 (68)	21 (70)	23 (73)	24 (75)	25 (77)	24 (75)	24 (75)	24 (75)	23 (73)	22 (72)	21 (70)	23 (73)
Average precipitation mm (inches)	7 (0.3)	7 (0.3)	9 (0.4)	21 (0.8)	101 (4.0)	152 (6.0)	188 (7.4)	170 (6.7)	159 (6.3)	115 (4.5)	47 (1.9)	29 (1.1)	1,005 (39.7)
Average rainy days	3.3	3.5	11.1	8.1	18.9	23.5	26.4	25.5	24.5	19.6	10.4	6.4	181.2
Source: Meteoblue

=== Barangays ===
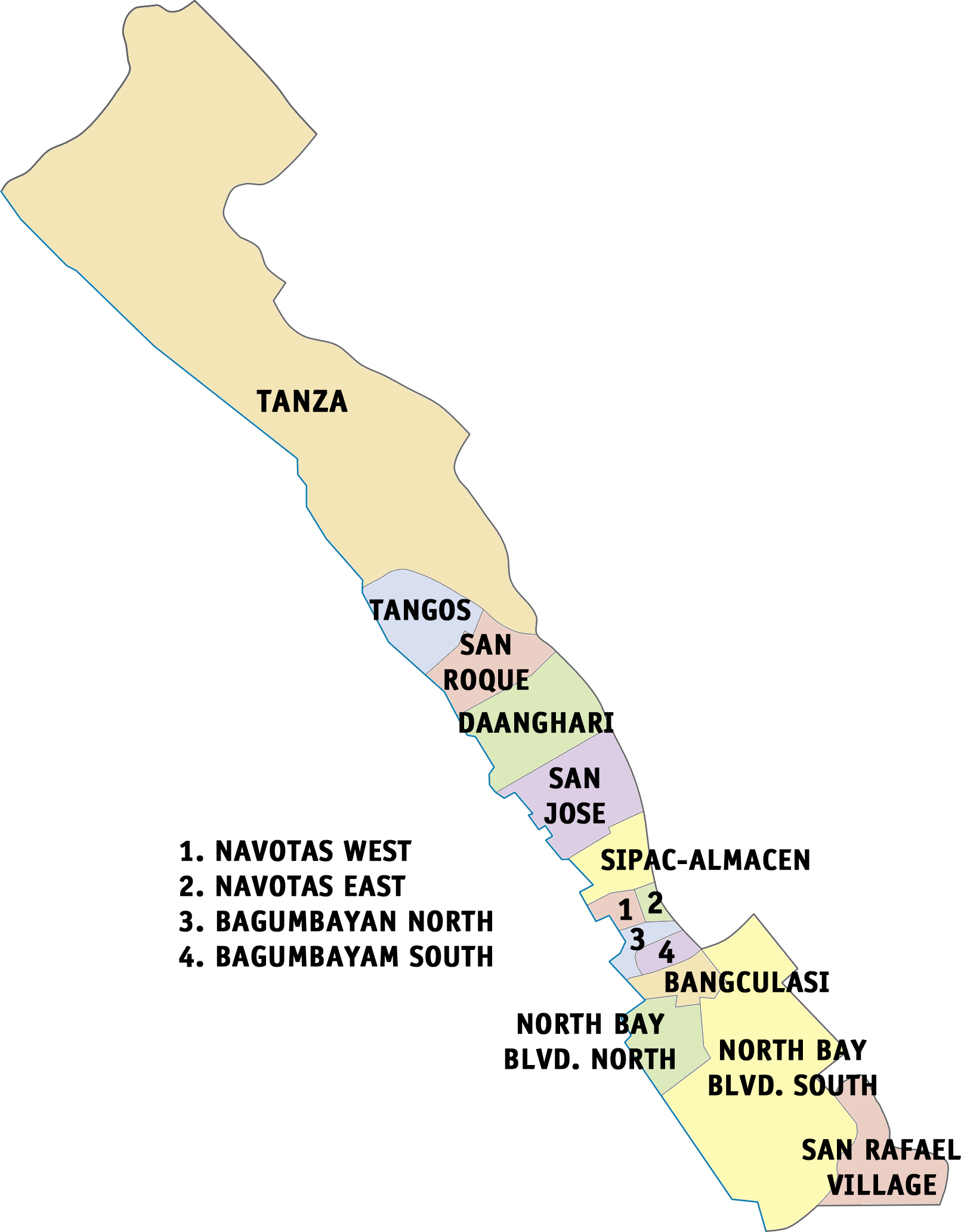
Political map of Navotas

Navotas is politically subdivided into 2 districts, with 18 barangays:

Barangays of Navotas
Administration			Population			
Barangay	District	Barangay Captain	2020	2010	10 year Change	Zip Code
Bagumbayan North	1st	Marilou Gonzales	1,677	2,652	-36.8%	
Bagumbayan South	1st	Lito Sulit	4,331	4,524	-4.3%	
Bangkulasi (Banculasi) (Note: The official website of the City of Navotas spells the barangay's name as "Bangkulasi" (which is also depicted in the barangay's seal that is shown by the website), while the Philippine Statistics Authority spells the name as "Bangculasi.")	1st	Ronaldo Reyes	8,344	8,263	+1%	
Daanghari	2nd	Alvin S. Oliveros	14,348	19,179	-25.2%	
Navotas East	1st	Dennis Tan Juan	2,126	2,241	-5.1%	
Navotas West	1st	Elvira Dela Rosa	6,367	8,698	-26.8%	
NBBS Dagat-dagatan (North Bay Boulevard South)	1st	Domingo L. Elape	32,681		est. +6.5%	
NBBS Kaunlaran (North Bay Boulevard South) (Note: Population figures refer to the former barangay of Northbay Boulevard South, which was divided into NBBS Dagat-dagatan, NBBS Kaunlaran, and NBBS Proper in 2018.)	1st	Federico S. Natividad, Jr.	21,916	68,375	est. +6.5%	
NBBS Proper (North Bay Boulevard South)	1st	Elvis I. Desabille	18,217		est. +6.5%	
North Bay Boulevard North	1st	Melvin F. Manalo	14,743	16,201	-9%	
San Jose (Poblacion)	2nd	Hernan B. Perez	23,950	28,153	-14.9%	1485
San Rafael Village	1st	George U. So	3,489	3,530	-1.2%	
San Roque	2nd	Enrico Plaza Gino-Gino	19,361	17,916	+8.1%	
Sipac Almacen	1st	Dorwin M. Villanueva	9,163	11,541	-20.6%	1485
Tangos North	2nd	Margarita P. Limbaro	17,514		est. +8.9%	1489
Tangos South (Note: Population figures refer to the former barangay of Tangos, which was divided into Tangos North and Tangos South in 2018.) (Tañgos)	2nd	Wilfredo R. Mariano	18,359	32,941	est. +8.9%	1489
Tanza 1 (Note: Population figures refer to the former barangay of Tanza, which was divided into Tanza 1 and Tanza 2 in 2018.)	2nd	Carlito . De Guzman	15,319	24,917	est. +24.2%	1490
Tanza 2	2nd	Rochelle C. Vicencio	15,638		est. +24.2%	

==== Population Changes ====
Some barangays in Navotas experienced dramatic population change between 2010 and 2020. This is because of an ongoing effort by the government to relocate informal settlers from hazard-prone areas to socialized housing built in Barangay Tanza 2.

==== Navotas East ====
Navotas East is bounded by Barangay Sipac-Almacen to the north, Barangay Tañong of Malabon (via Estrella Bridge over Navotas River) to the east, Barangay Navotas West to the west, and Brgy. Bagumbayan North to the south. Their patron saint is San Ildefonso.

==== San Jose ====
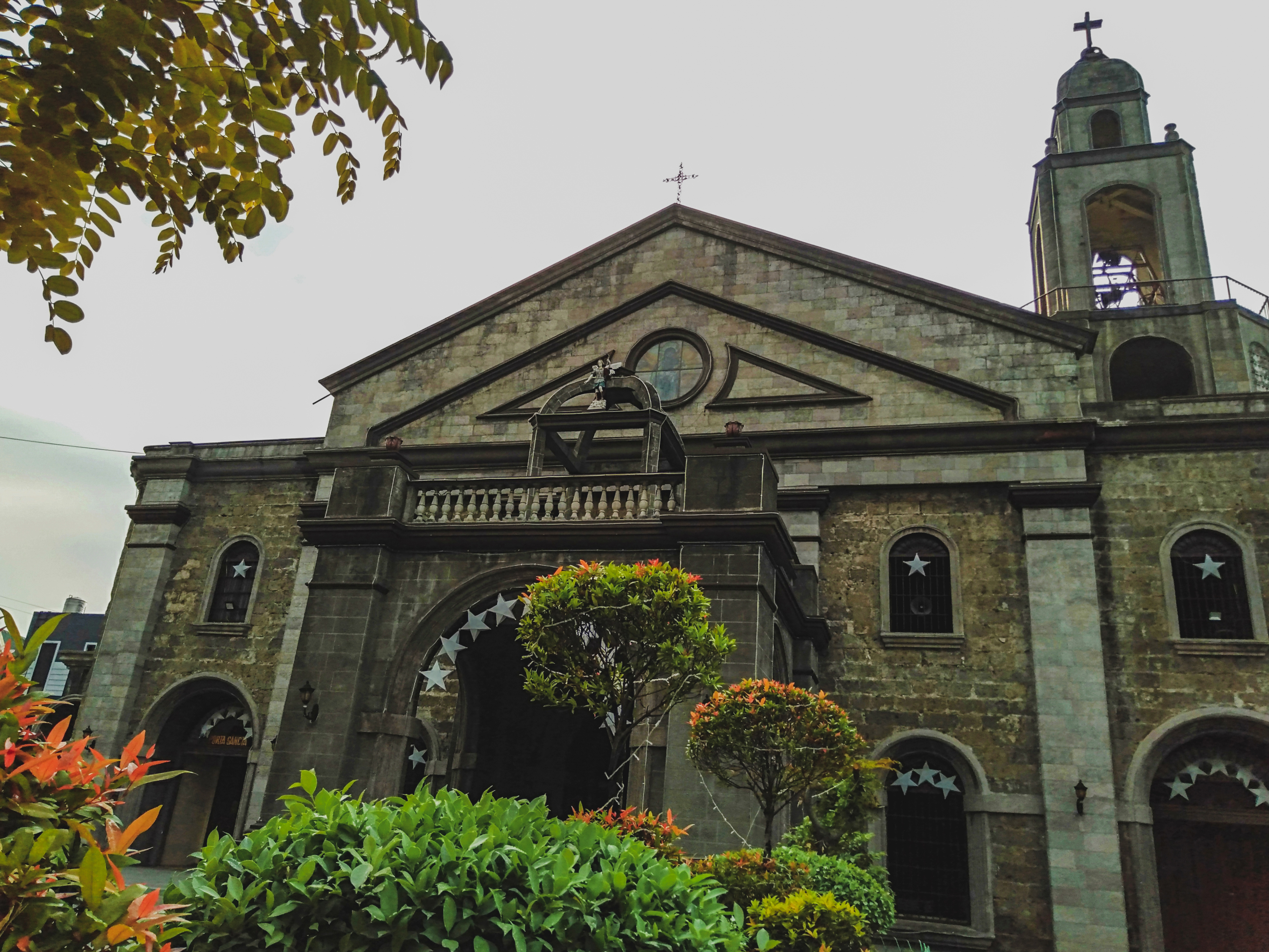
Diocesan Shrine and Parish of San Jose de Navotas

The name of Barangay San Jose was derived from the Diocesan Shrine and Parish of San Jose de Navotas, the first place of worship in the town.

==== San Roque ====
Barangay San Roque is bounded by Tangos South to the northwest and north, Tangos North and Tanza, Navotas (via Badeo 5) to the northeast, Brgy. Hulong Duhat, Malabon and Brgy. Flores, Malabon in Malabon to the east (via Navotas River, Badeo 4), Manila Bay to the west and Brgy. Daanghari to the south. Its name is derived from San Roque de Navotas Parish, the first place of worship in the town.

It is famous for its annual fiesta, every last Saturday and Sunday of the month of January. Every fiesta the whole barangay (including Brgy's Tangos North and Tangos South) is filled with stalls and stores. Also every fiesta of San Roque, A. Dela Cruz St. is full of stalls which sell kalamay, from Batangas.

==== Sipac-Almacen ====
Barangay Sipac-Almacen is famous for the location of the Navotas City Hall and some points of interest like Navotas National High School, the main high school of Navotas, Navotas Playground, and others.

=== Former Barangays ===
Until 2018 Navotas had 14 barangays.

==== Northbay Boulevard South ====
In accordance with Republic Act No. 10933, approved by President Rodrigo Duterte on August 23, 2017, and ratified in a plebiscite on January 5, 2018, Northbay Boulevard South was divided into Barangays NBBS Kaunlaran, NBBS Dagat-dagatan, and NBBS Proper.

==== Tangos ====
Pursuant to Republic Act No. 10934, approved by President Rodrigo Duterte on August 23, 2017, and ratified in a plebiscite on January 5, 2018, Tangos was divided into Barangays Tangos North and Tangos South.

==== Tanza ====
Barangay Tanza occupied the northernmost portion of the city, including Isla Pulo which is separated from the city proper, and was bounded by Barangay Binuangan and Salambao in Obando, Bulacan to the north, Manila Bay and Barangay San Roque to the west, Barangay Hulong Duhat and Dampalit, Malabon to the east, and Barangay Tangos to the south.

By virtue of Republic Act No. 10935, approved by President Rodrigo Duterte on August 23, 2017, and ratified in a plebiscite on January 5, 2018, Tanza was divided into Barangays Tanza 1 and Tanza 2.

Both Tanza 1 and Tanza 2 are accessible via Badeo 5 in Barangay San Roque, Navotas and the Tanza-Malabon Bridge in Barangay Hulong Duhat in Malabon.

== Demographics ==
Population census of Navotas

Year	Pop.	±% p.a.
1903	11,688	—
1918	13,454	+0.94%
1939	20,861	+2.11%
1948	28,889	+3.68%
1960	49,262	+4.55%
1970	83,245	+5.38%
1975	97,098	+3.14%
1980	126,146	+5.37%

Year	Pop.	±% p.a.
1990	187,479	+4.04%
1995	229,039	+3.82%
2000	230,403	+0.13%
2007	245,344	+0.87%
2010	249,131	+0.56%
2015	249,463	+0.03%
2020	247,543	−0.16%
2024	252,878	+0.51%

Source: Philippine Statistics Authority

Navotas is a highly urbanized, densely populated coastal city in Metro Manila with a 2024 population of 252,878, with a density of 28,300 inhabitants per square kilometre or 73,300 inhabitants per square mile. Known as the "Fishing Capital of the Philippines," it has a land area of 8.94 to 10.69 sq km, a median age of around 26-27, and a predominantly young, working-age population.

=== Demonym ===
The native people in Navotas refer to themselves as "Navoteño"

=== Language ===
Filipino and English are the Philippine official languages. Filipino, a standardized version of Tagalog, is spoken primarily in Metro Manila.

=== Religion ===
Catholicism is the predominant religion in Metro Manila. Other Christian denominations, Muslims, Anitists, animists, and atheists are the minority.

== Economy ==
Poverty incidence of Navotas (%)

Source: Philippine Statistics Authority

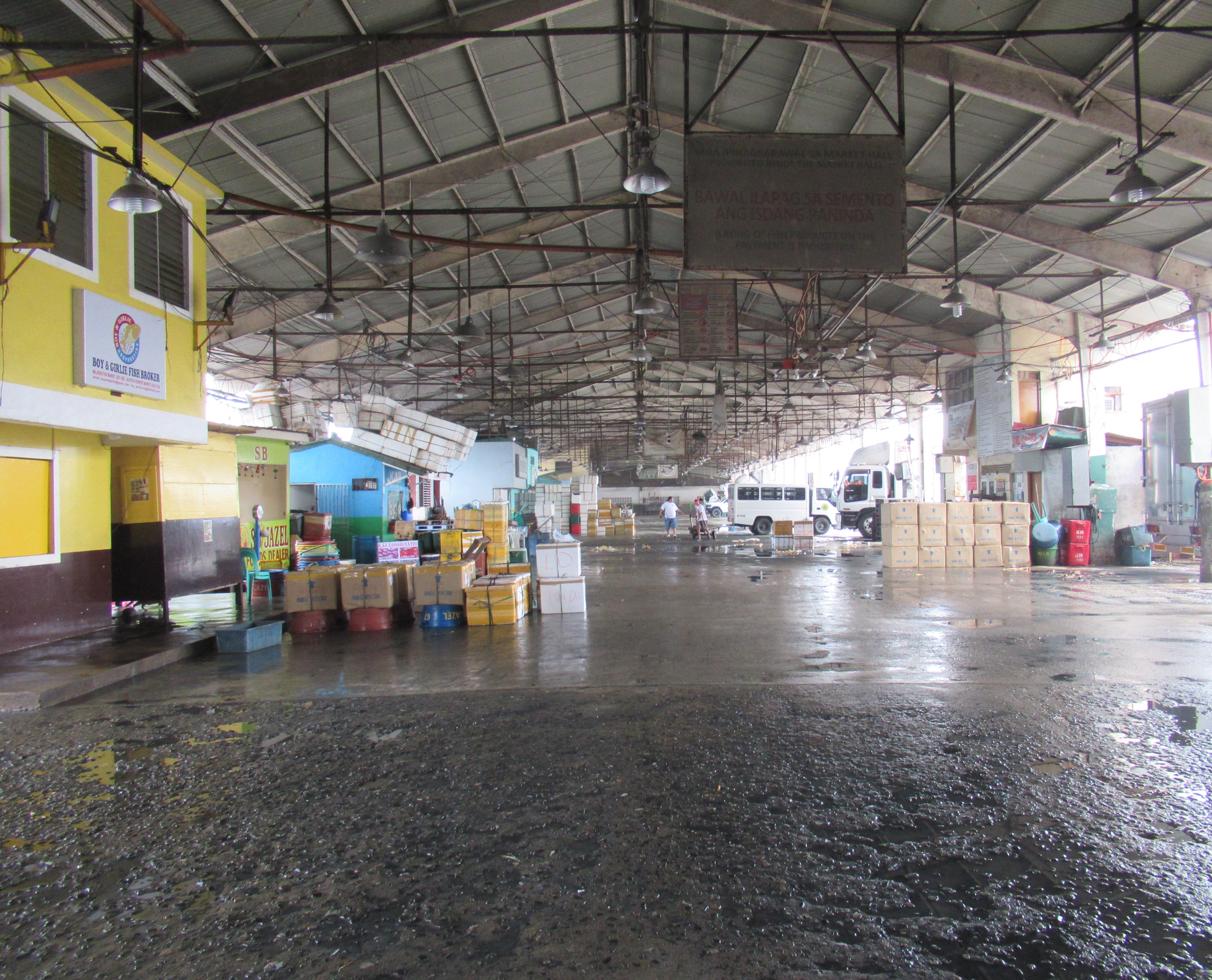
Navotas Fish Port Complex

=== Fishing and Aquaculture ===
Navotas has been dubbed as the Fishing Capital of the Philippines. The city is home to the Navotas Fish Port Complex, which is considered as the Philippines's premier fish center.

=== Shipbuilding and repair ===
In the ship repair sector, the Navotas complex is expected to accommodate 96 vessels for repair.

== Government ==
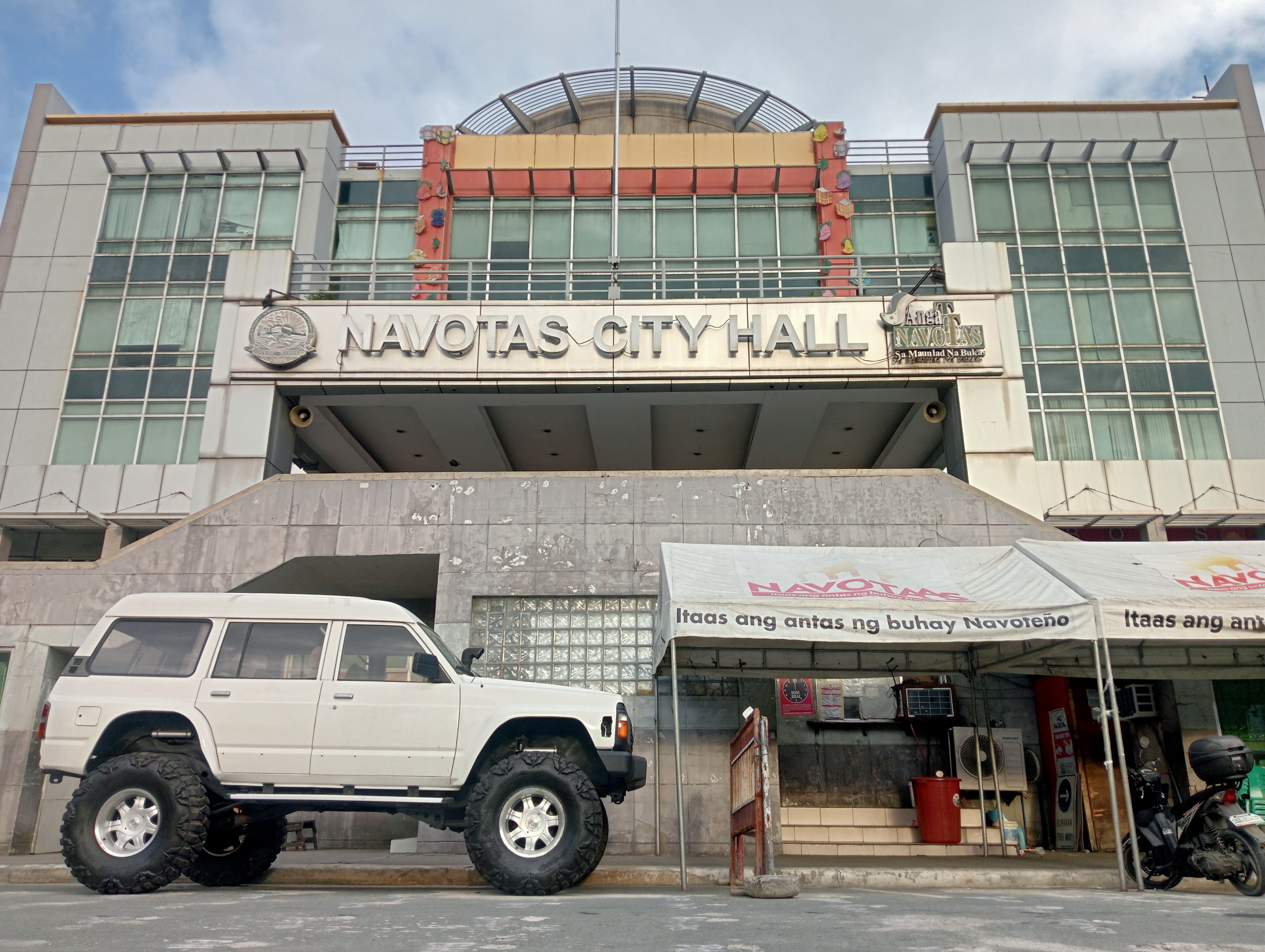
Navotas City Hall

=== Local government ===
The local government of Navotas, a highly urbanized city in the National Capital Region of the Philippines officially established in 2007, operates under a mayor-council system led by the Mayor and a 12-member Sangguniang Panlungsod (City Council). As the "Fishing Capital of the Philippines," the city government focuses on sustaining its massive fishing industry while implementing programs in education, health, and social services, often emphasizing an empowered citizenry. Currently led by Mayor John Rey Tiangco, the administration works to improve the quality of life through infrastructure, livelihood opportunities, and environmental management across its barangays, often in coordination with national agencies for urban development.

=== Elected officials ===
Incumbent Navotas city officials
Name	Party
House of Representatives
Tobias Reynald M. Tiangco	Navoteño
City Mayor
John Reynald M. Tiangco	Navoteño
City Vice Mayor
Tito M. Sanchez	Navoteño
1st District
Reynaldo A. Monroy	Navoteño
Lance Angelo E. Santiago	Navoteño
Mylene R. Sanchez	Navoteño
Anna V. Nazal-Cabrera	Navoteño
Arvie John S. Vicencio	Navoteño
Edgardo DC. Maño	Navoteño
2nd District
Clint Nicolas B. Geronimo	Navoteño
Ron Hansel Miguel S. Naval	Navoteño
Emil Justin Angelo G. Gino-gino	Navoteño
Cesar Justine F. Santos	Navoteño
Analiza DC. Lupisan	Navoteño
Rochelle C. Vicencio	Navoteño
Ex officio City Council members
ABC President	Marilou Gonzales
SK President	Jodile Cañete

=== Political profile ===
With regards to the separation of Navotas from Malabon in 1859 and the organization thereof as a distinct municipality or "pueblo" with its own government and church, this town was headed by the gobernadorcillos who exercised executive and judicial functions. However, as this locality was composed of two groups the naturales and the mestizos, each of which had its own gobernadorcillo appointed by the governor-general who was the supreme authority in all local matters, since the inhabitants did not allow choosing their officials. This political system was somehow revoked at the end of the Spanish Regime through the Maura Law of 1883, which guided some of the selected officials to the supervision of an insular authority. During the revolutionary period (from 1898 to 1902), as the democratic system of local governance was being established via the First Philippines Republic and Malolos Constitution, people of Navotas with high character, social position and honorable conduct gathered in a meeting and elected the chief of the town, the headman of the barrio (barangay) and three officials viz., for police and internal order, justice and civil registry, and taxes and property. In this situation, these elected officials constitute an assembly wherein the chief of the town was the president, the headman, the vice-president, and the justice officer the secretary. In this period, the name of Navotas LGU and its head were changed from "pueblo to municipality" and from "President to Mayor". Philippine Commission, which exercised supervision over local government, appointed the first local official. Gradually, election of officials was allowed.

During the period of the Philippine Commonwealth (from 1935 to 1945), the 1935 constitution ushered. This provided that the President of the Philippines should exercise general supervision over all local governments. This allowed Navotas to have three leaders. This trend from 1946 to 1972 (during the second Philippine Republic) was toward decentralization. Congress passed laws giving more autonomy to Local Government Units through the grant of additional powers and lessening of national control affairs. This created four Mayors of Navotas. During the Martial Law Period, President Marcos had changed the structure and functions of LGU's, thus decentralization suffered the set back with the concentration of power on his hands. After December 31, 1975 (expiration of tenure of office of the local elective officials), the President assumed the power of appointment of the officials as authorized by the people in a referendum held on February 27, 1975. During the Marcos Regime, Navotas had two Mayors.

Navotas was proclaimed as a full-fledged city by virtue of RA 9387 that converted the municipality of Navotas into a highly urbanized city. A plebiscite was held on June 24, 2007, which was ratified the conversion of Navotas into a highly urbanized city.

== Education ==
Navotas is supervised under the Division of City Schools–Navotas. Navotas has 15 public elementary schools and 6 public secondary schools including Navotas National High School and Kaunlaran High School. The Navotas Polytechnic College located at the North Bay Boulevard South in Kaunlaran Village is owned and operated by the city.

== Sports ==
Navotas was home to the Navotas Uni-Pak Sardines, a founding member of the Maharlika Pilipinas Basketball League during its inaugural season and played for three seasons until the 2019–20 season.

== Transportation ==
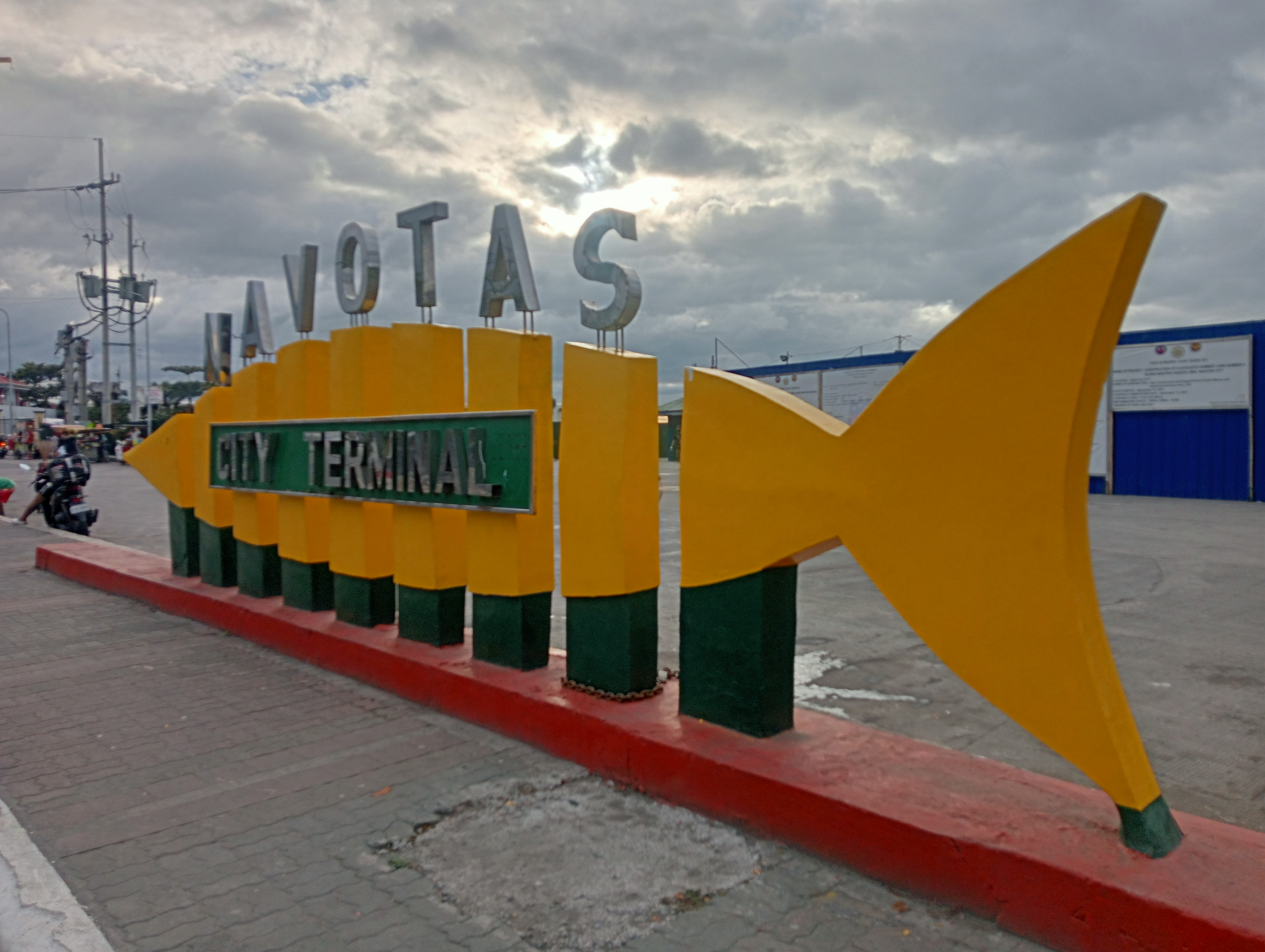
Navotas City Terminal

Transportation in Navotas is provided by cars, bicycle pedicab, tricycles, boats, bus, jeepney and taxi.

C-4 Road between Tanong, Malabon and Navotas West is the most popular bus stopover.

Commuting in boats is popular in the city because of its location by Manila Bay. The pier of commuting boats are located in San Roque, Navotas that connects to Tanza, Navotas, which is separated by water.

== Notable personalities ==
- Lean Alejandro, student leader and left-wing nationalist political activist
- Luz Oliveros-Belardo, National Scientist of the Philippines for Phytochemistry
- Engracia Cruz-Reyes, chef and entrepreneur
- Rufino Sescon Jr., fifth bishop of Roman Catholic Diocese of Balanga
- Jorella Marie de Jesus, professional volleyball player
- Froilan Baguion, professional basketball player
- Gerald Santos, singer and actor
- Jelo Acosta, rapper & actor
- Wendy Valdez, beauty queen, and an actress.
- Ate Negi, Comedian, Host
- Jennie Gabriel, singer

== Sister cities ==
- Parañaque, Philippines
- Manila, Philippines
