= Navotas Island =

Island in Navotas, Philippines

Isla ng Navotas
- Location within Luzon Location within Philippines

Geography
- Coordinates: 14°39′49″N 120°56′35″E
- Adjacent to: Manila Bay; Tullahan River
- Area: 1.95 km^{2} (0.75 sq mi)

Administration
- Philippines
- Region: National Capital Region
- City: Navotas

Demographics
- Population: 117,196 (2020)
- Pop. density: 60,100/km^{2} (155700/sq mi)
- Ethnic groups: Tagalog

Navotas Island is an island in the city of Navotas, Philippines, within Metro Manila. Situated in the Tullahan River delta, it is surrounded on the west by Manila Bay, on the north by the Tangos River, on the east by the Navotas River, and on the south by the Tullahan River. The city center or poblacion of Navotas is located on the island. With an estimated land area of 1.95 km^{2} (0.75 sq mi), Navotas Island is one of the most densely populated islands in the world.

== Barangays ==
Nine out of the eighteen barangays of the city are located in the island. They are namely;

- Bagumbayan North
- Bagumbayan South
- Daanghari
- Navotas East
- Navotas West
- San Jose (Poblacion)
- San Roque
- Sipac-Almacen
- Tangos North
- Tangos South

== Geography ==
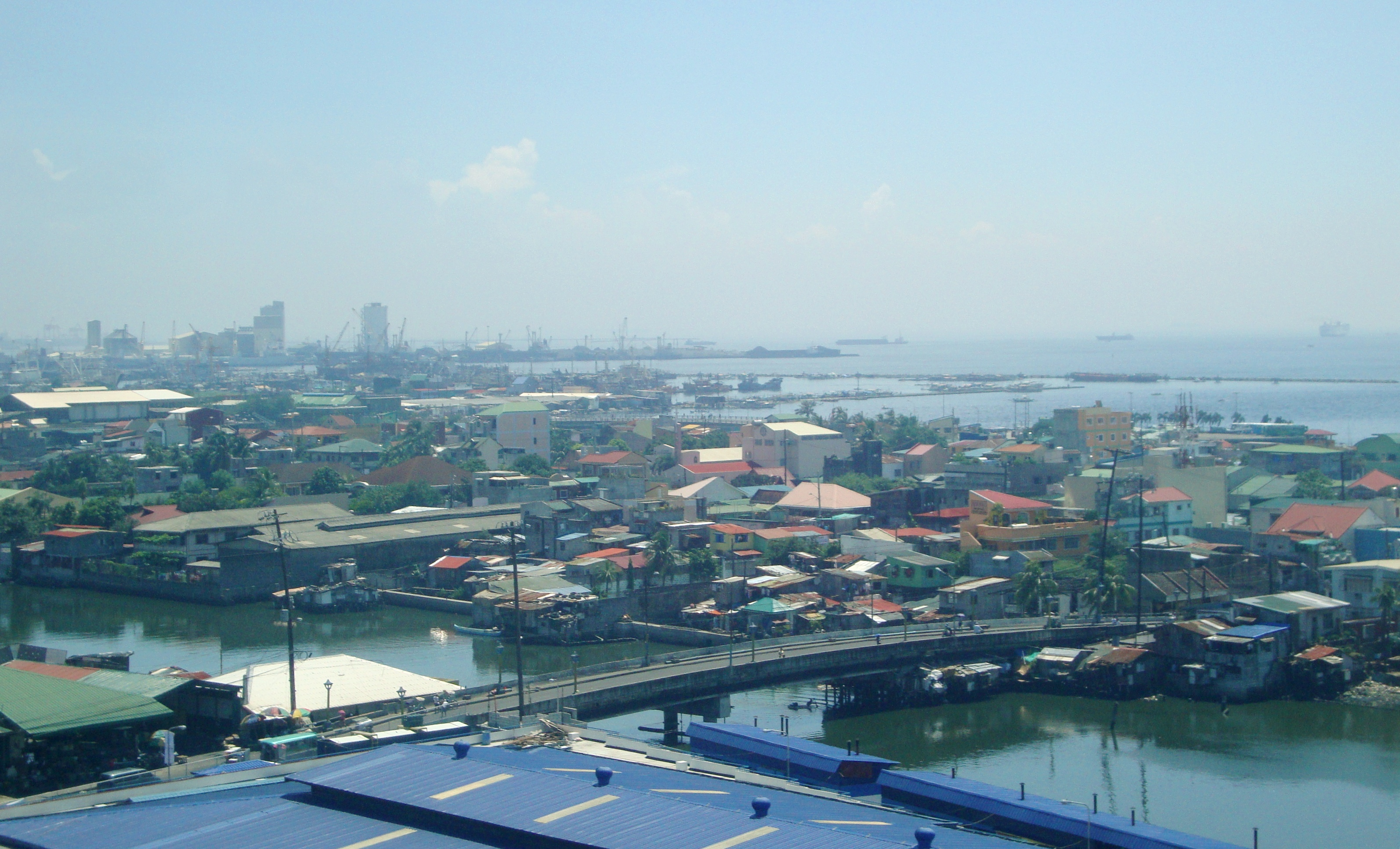
View of Navotas Island from Malabon City Hall

The island is located at the mouth of the Tullahan River delta, in the northwest of Metro Manila. Bridges connect the island to the rest of city of Navotas in the south and to the city of Malabon in the east.

== Demographics ==
The total population of Navotas Island is 117,196.

As of 2020, below is the total population of the barangays of Navotas Island.

Barangay	Population (2020)
Bagumbayan North	1,677
Bagumbayan South	4,331
Daanghari	14,348
Navotas East	2,126
Navotas West	6,367
San Jose	23,950
San Roque	19,361
Sipac-Almacen	9,163
Tangos North	17,514
Tangos South	18,359
Total	117,196

== Transport ==
There are jeepney routes going to Navotas from nearby cities, Malabon, Caloocan and Manila. Also, direct bus lines to Navotas from several cities in Mega Manila, such as Parañaque, Taguig, Muntinlupa, Makati, Dasmariñas, Cavite and San Pedro, Laguna.

Boat trips are also available from Malabon and Barangay Tanza to Navotas.

== Gallery ==
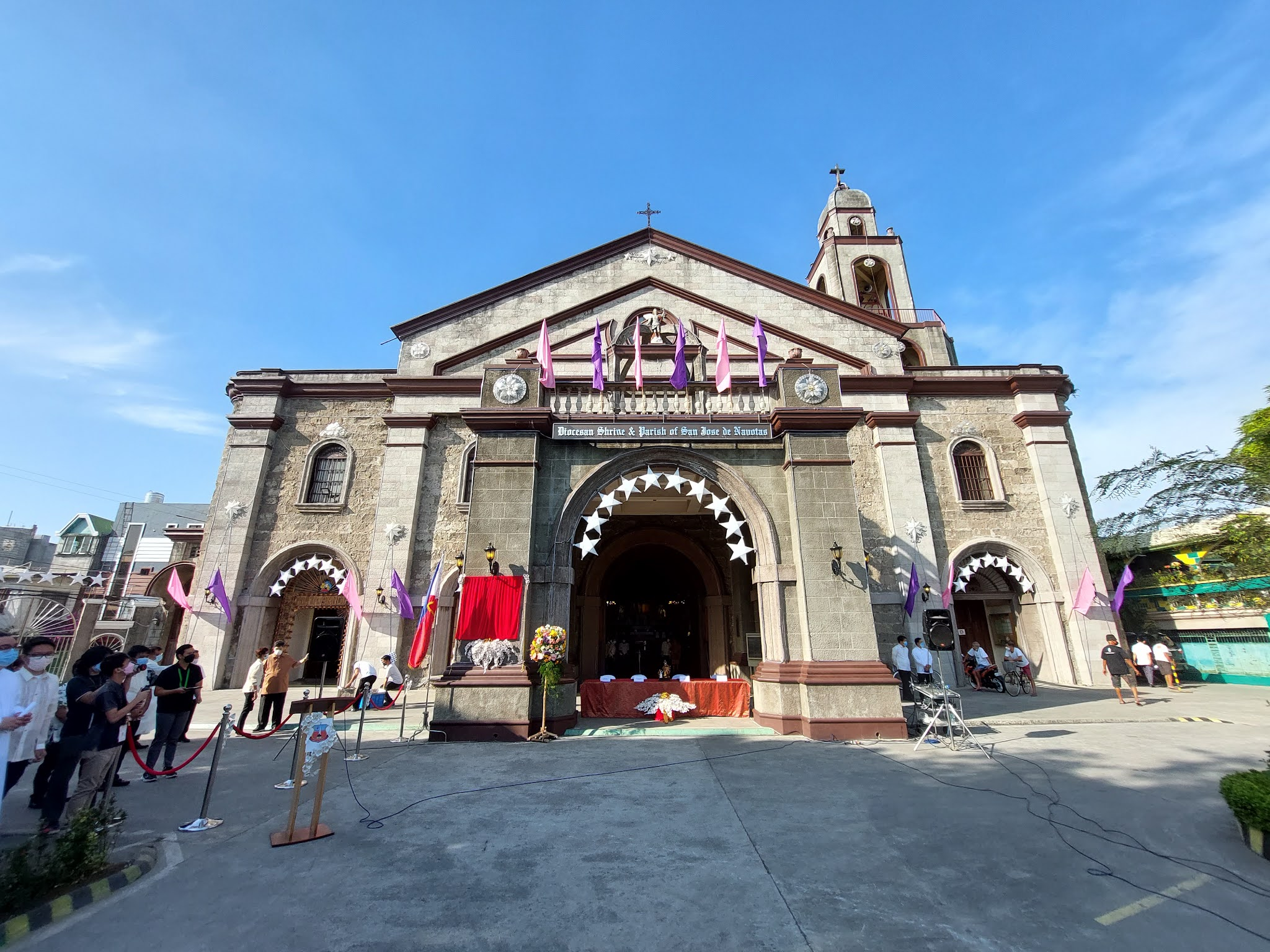
Diocesan Center and San Jose Parish church located in the poblacion of Navotas

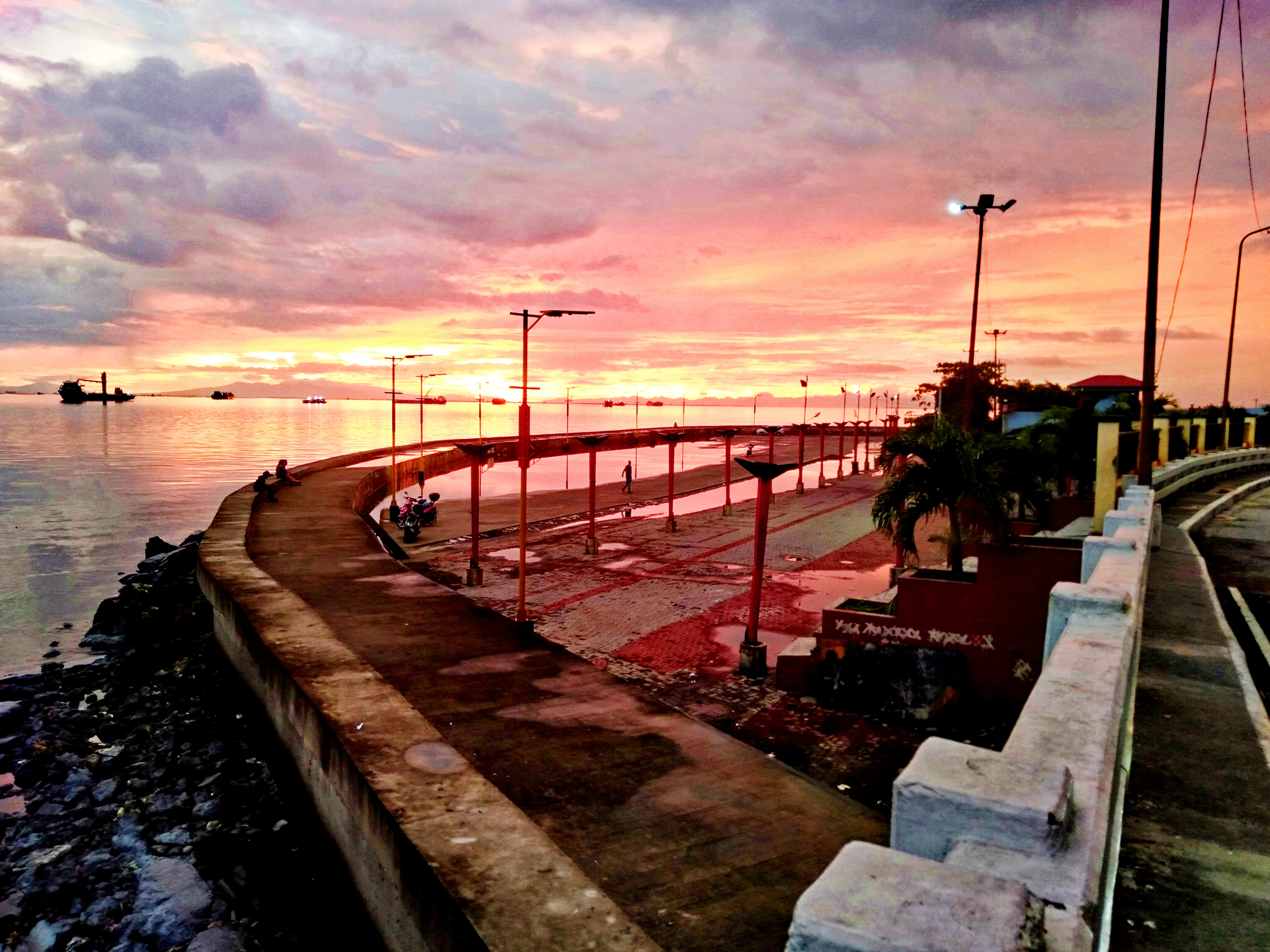
Navotas Centennial Park in Barangay Bagumbayan South

City Hall of Navotas

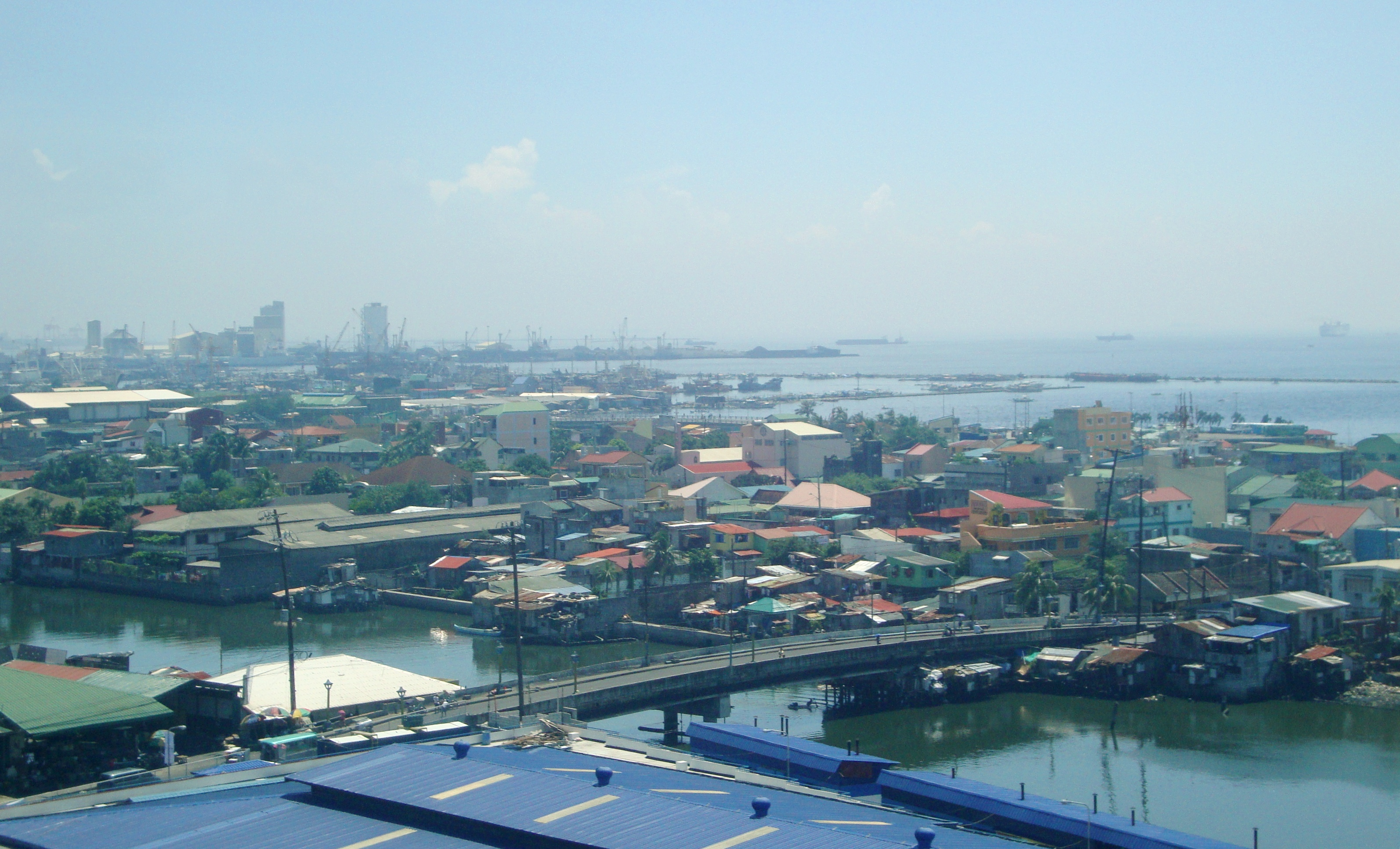
Aerial Shot of Navotas

== See also ==
- List of islands by population density
- List of islands in the Greater Manila Area
- River island
