= List of islands in the Greater Manila Area =

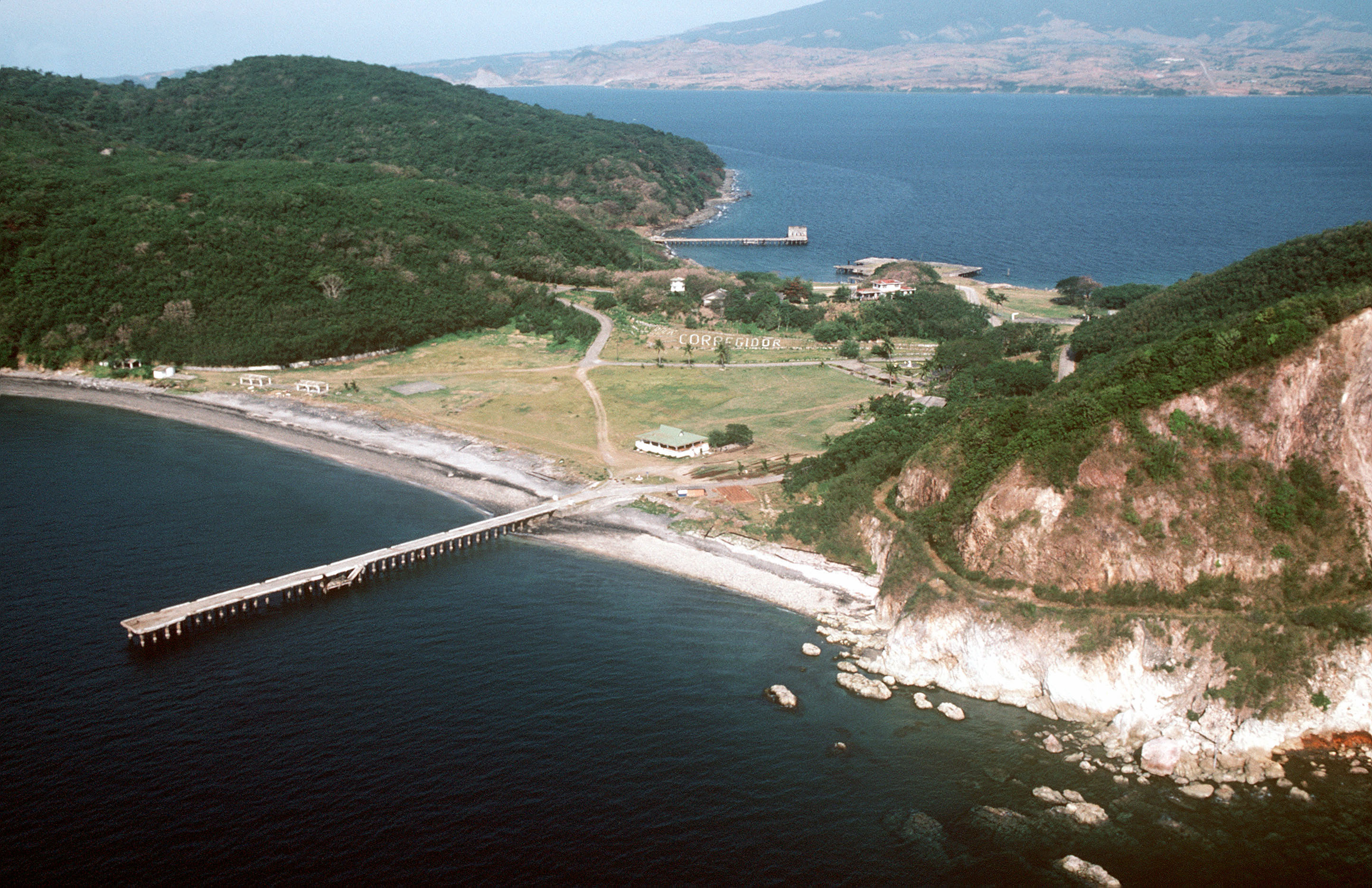
The island of Corregidor at the entrance to Manila Bay

This is a list of islands in the Greater Manila Area in the Philippines.

There are several small islands located within the Greater Manila Area, particularly along the coast of Manila Bay, both natural and artificial. Many of these islands were formed by the Pasig River delta and consist of sand and mudflats. Artificial islands have been built particularly in Tondo's North Port area, the Navotas fish port area, and the Las Piñas–Parañaque reclamation area.

Historically, the City of Manila consisted of small islands formed by rivulets called esteros. They include Binondo, formed by the Estero de Binondo and Estero de la Reina, and San Miguel, formed by the Estero de San Miguel and Estero de Sampaloc. The walled district of Intramuros was itself an island surrounded by moats during the Spanish colonial period. Many of these waterways have been filled i over the years due to urbanization.

Near the entrance to Manila Bay is a group of islands, the largest of which is Corregidor. Although administered as part of the province of Cavite, these islands are linked historically to Manila, serving as part of the city's defense system through much of the Spanish and American colonial eras.

== List of islands ==
=== Metro Manila ===
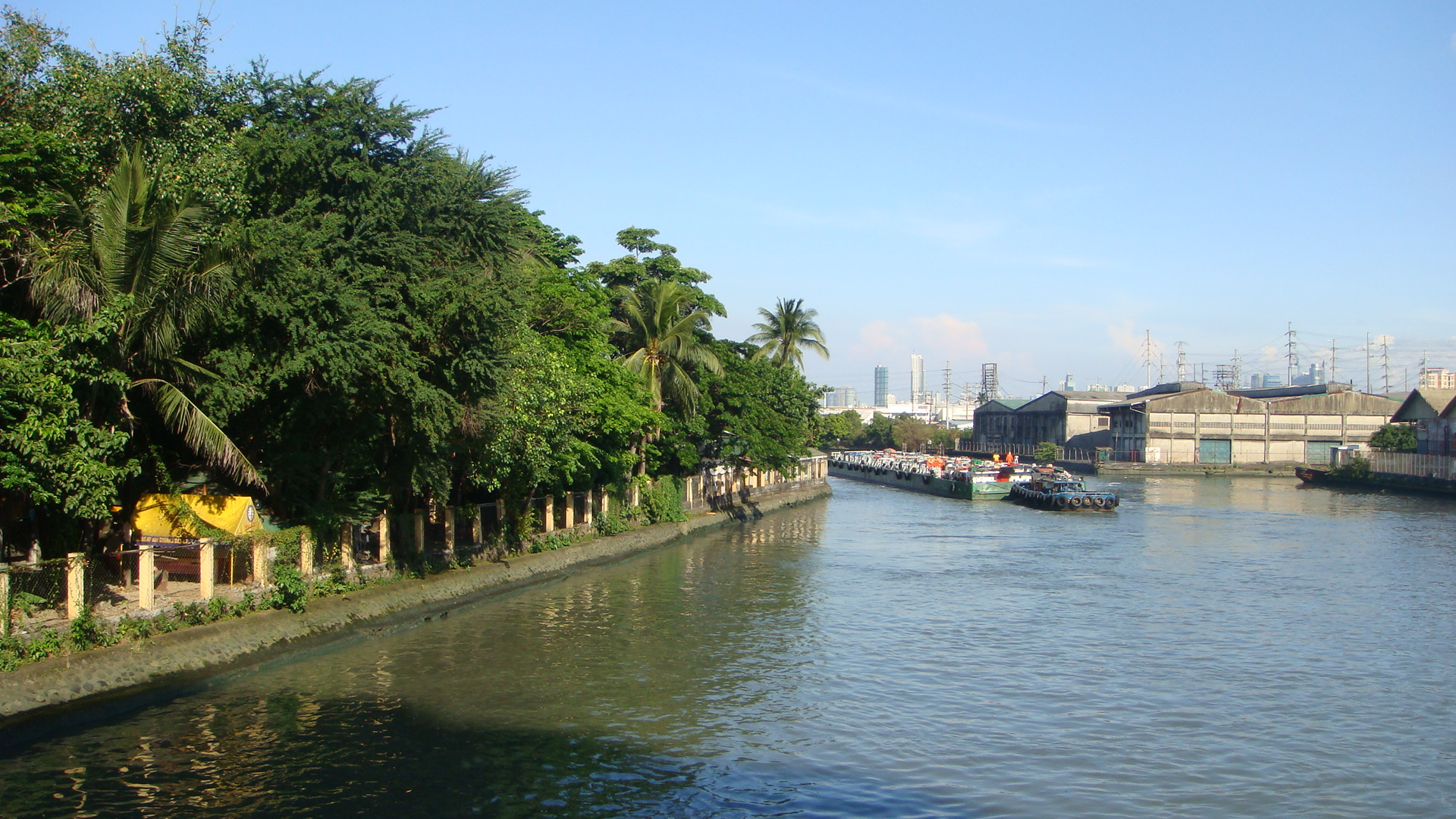
Isla de Convalecencia, an ait on the Pasig River

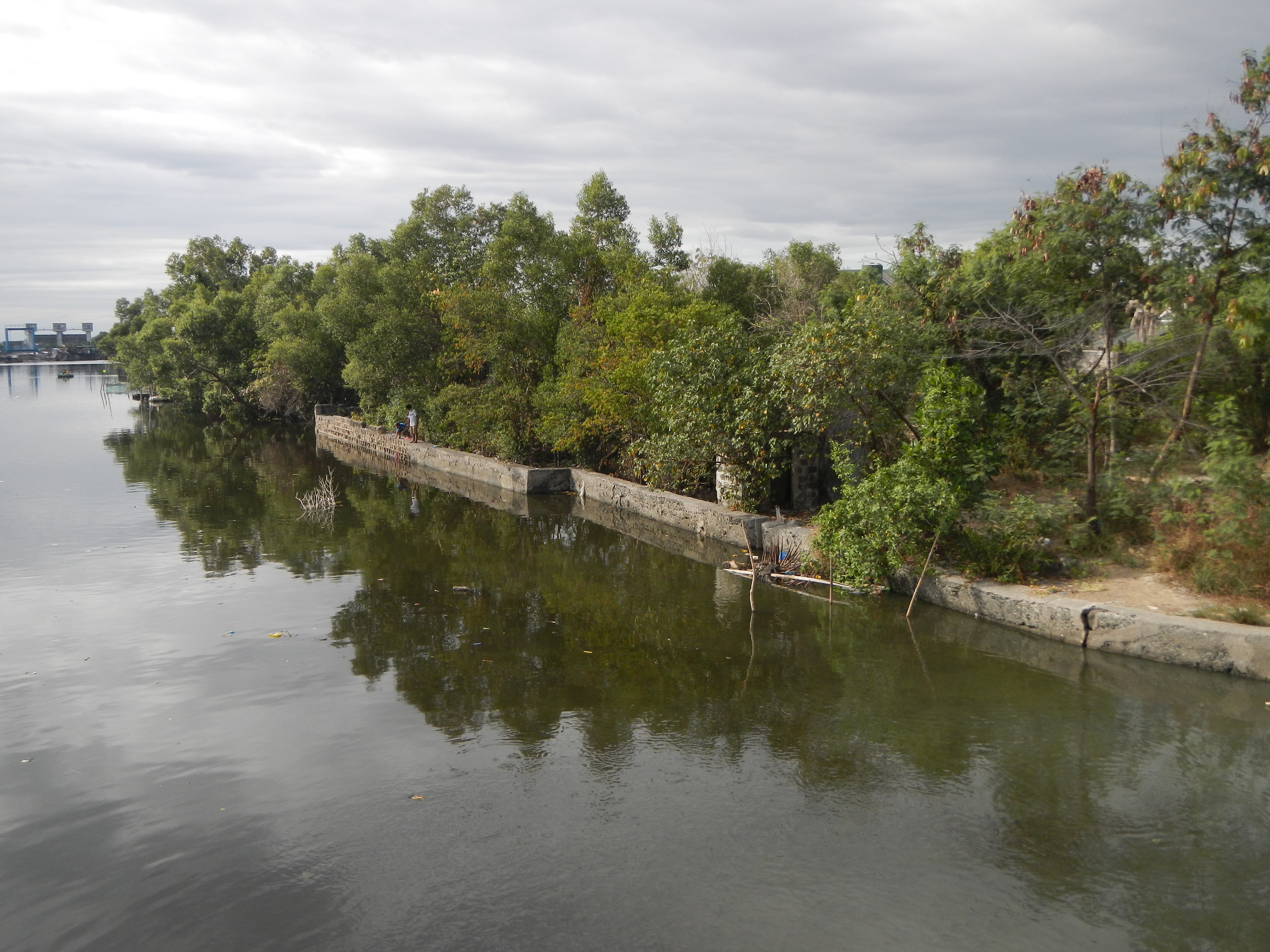
Dampalit, an island barangay in Malabon

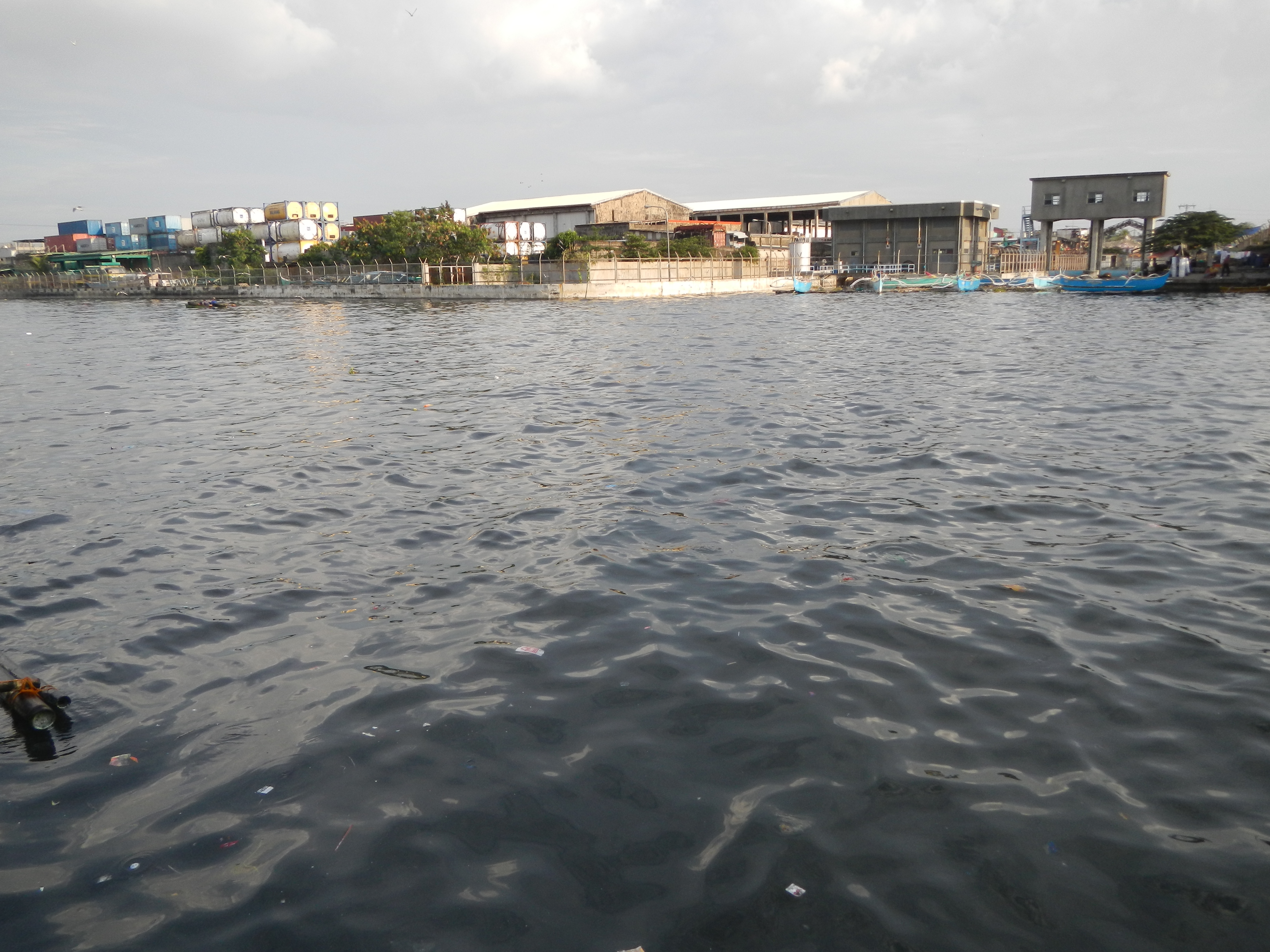
The Navotas Fish Port Complex, an artificial island north of Manila North Harbor

City of Manila

- Engineer's Island
  - A 25-30-hectare artificial island which contains Baseco Compound, an urban poor community separated from the Manila South Harbor by a narrow channel at the mouth of the Pasig River.
- Isla de Balút
  - An artificial island in the Manila North Harbor in Tondo bounded on the north by Estero de Sunog Apog (Estero de Marela), on the south and east by Estero de Vitas, and Manila Bay on the west.
- Isla de Cocomo
  - A historical and localized urban area situated within the northern part of Tondo, largely associated with the City of Navotas near San Rafael Village and the Navotas Fishport Complex
- Isla de Convalecencia
  - The only ait dividing the Pasig River in the City of Manila, located in San Miguel District.
- Isla de Provisor
  - A small island in northwestern Paco District surrounded by Estero de Provisor, Estero del Tanque, and the Pasig River.

Malabon - Navotas

- Isla Pulo
  - An island sitio north of the main island of Navotas.
- Dampalit Island
  - An island barangay and one of the six original islands on which Malabon was founded. It is separated from the mainland on the east by the Muzon River, the Batasan River on the north, and from Navotas on the west by the Dampalit River.
- Malabón Island
  - Malabon city proper is on one of the six islands which originally comprised Malabon. It is bounded on the north by Dampalit River, on the east and south by Tullahan River and on the west by the Navotas and Tanza rivers which separate it from Navotas.
- Maysilo Island
  - An island barangay and one of six islands of Malabón, in the mangrove swamps north of Manila.
- Navotas Fish Port Complex
  - An artificial island immediately to the north of Isla de Balút, separated from the main island of Navotas on the north by the Bangkulasi Channel and Tullahan River, on the east from Caloocan by the Navotas River, and on the south by Estero de Sunog Apog (Estero de Marela).
- Navotas Island
  - Navotas city proper is situated on an elongated coastal island, its length on a northwest–southeast axis. It is separated from Malabon by the Malabón-Navotas River.
- Tanza Island
  - An island barangay in Navotas surrounded by the Tangos, Batasan, and Tanza rivers.

Las Piñas - Parañaque

- Long Island
  - One of three artificial islands that form the Las Piñas–Parañaque Critical Habitat and Ecotourism Area.
- Freedom Island
  - One of three artificial islands that form the Las Piñas–Parañaque Critical Habitat and Ecotourism Area.

=== Manila Bay Islands ===
- Caballo Island
- Carabao Island
- Corregidor Island
- El Fraile Island
- La Monja Island
- Limbones Island
- Los Cochinos Islands

=== Central Luzon ===
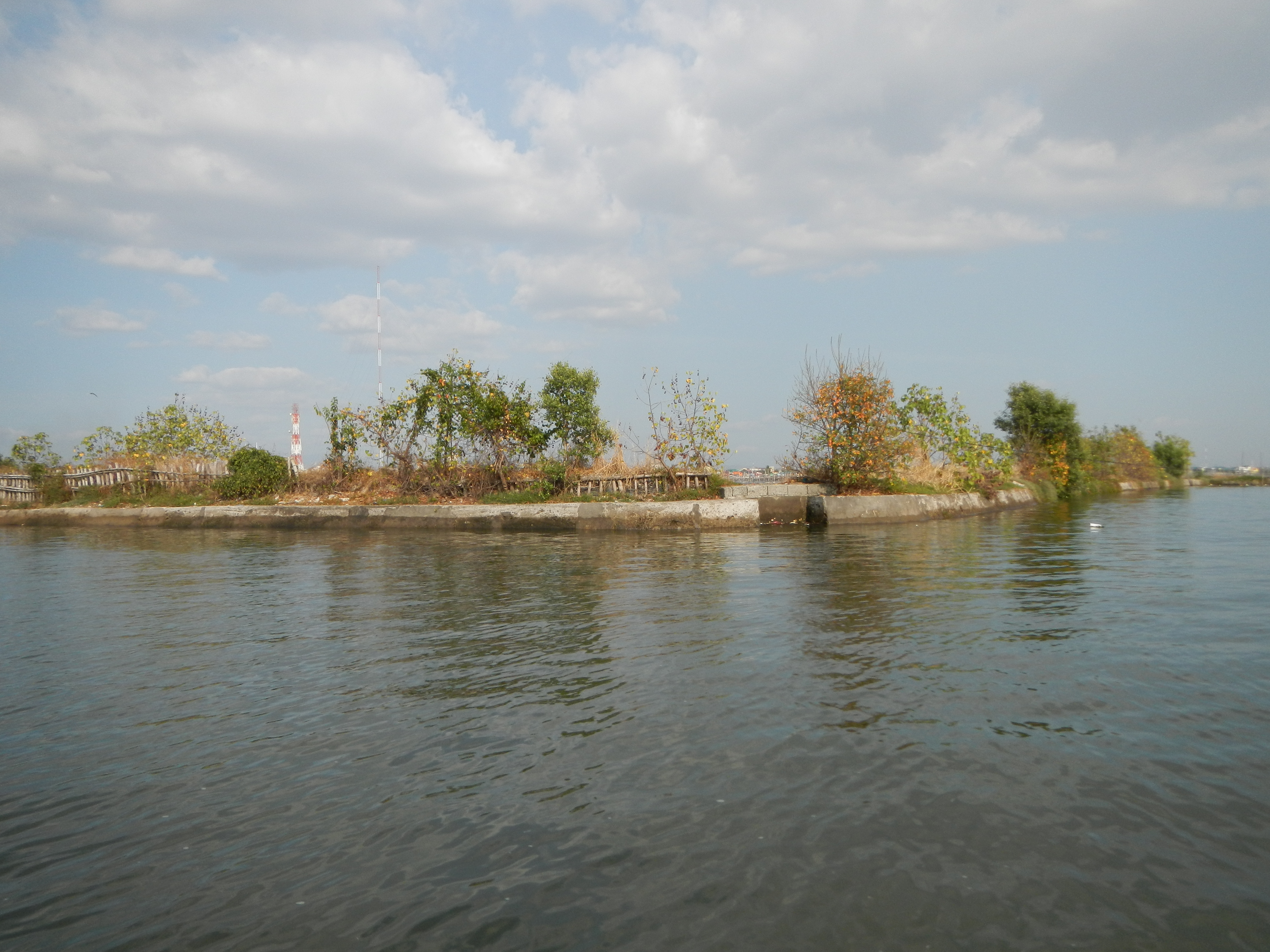
The island barangay of Salambao in Obando, Bulacan just north of Isla Pulo, Navotas

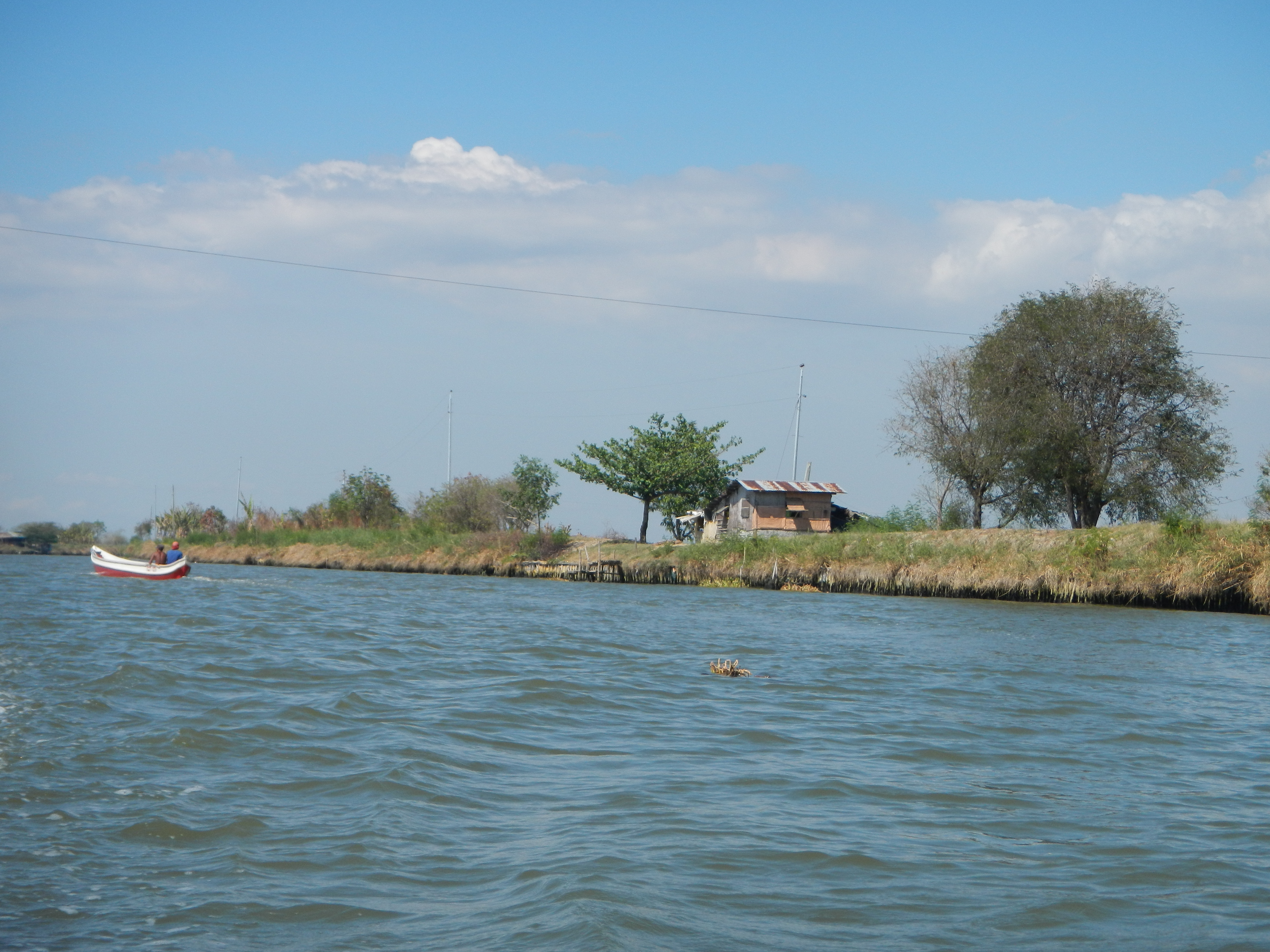
The island barangay of San Esteban in Manila Bay off the coast of Macabebe, Pampanga

- Binuangan Island
- Camara Island
- Capones Island
- Egg Islands
- Hermana Mayor Island
- Hermana Menor Island
- Los Frailes Islands
- Magalawa Island
- Matalvi Island
- Pamana (Pequeña) Island
- Pampanga River Delta Islands
- Panatag Shoal or Scarborough Shoal (also claimed by China and Taiwan)
- Potipot Island
- Salvador Island
- Silanguin Island
- Subic Chiquita Island
- Subic Grande Island
- Tabones Island

=== Calabarzon ===
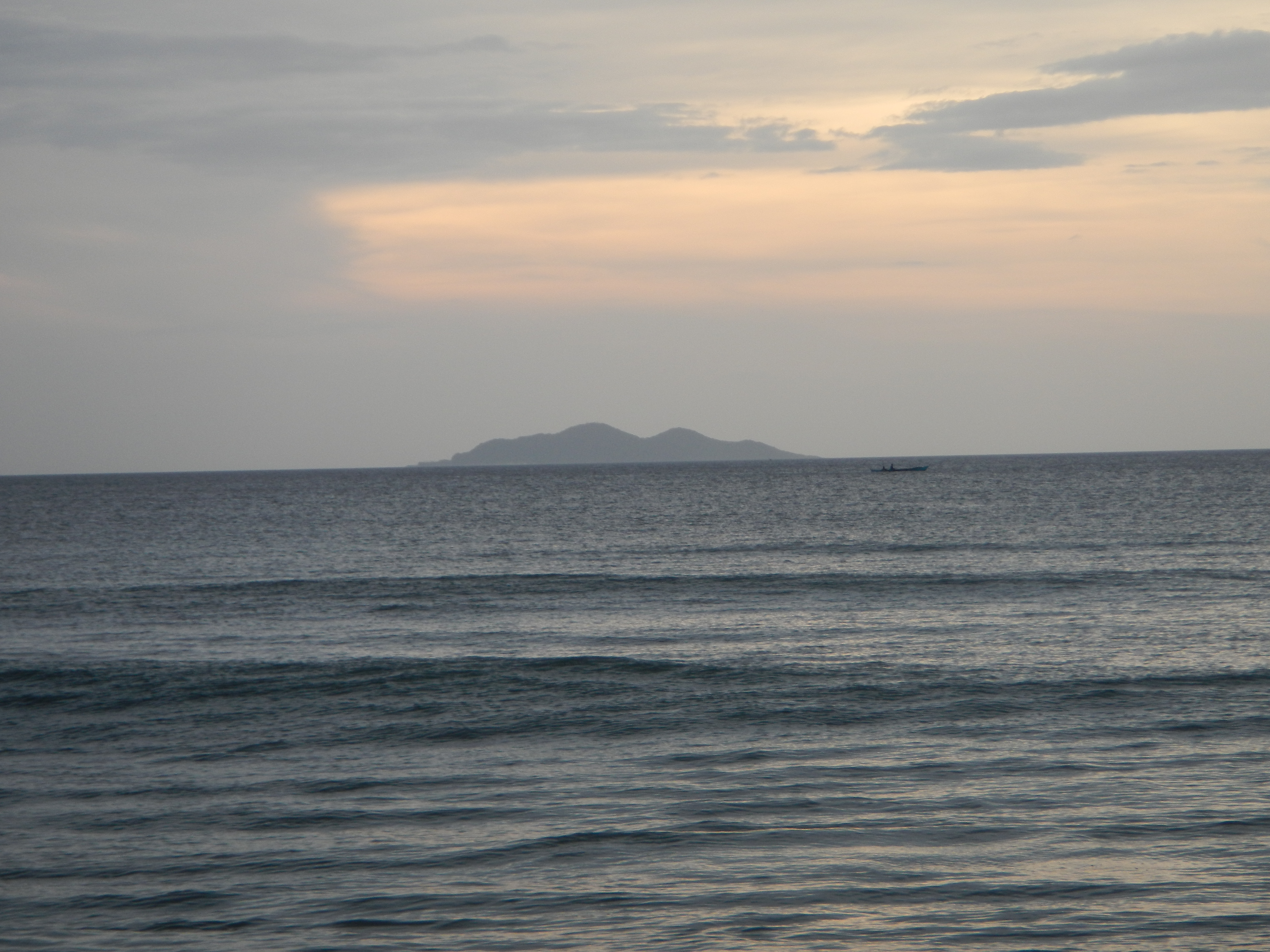
Fortune Island as seen from Nasugbu

- Alabat Island
- Alibijaban Island
- Anilon Island
- Apat Island
- Bakaw-Bakaw Island
- Balot Island
- Baluti Island
- Binombonan Island
- Bird Island
- Bonga Island
- Bonito Island
- Bubuin Island
- Burunggoy Island
- Caban Island
- Cagbalete Island
- Calamba Island
- Culebra Island
- Dalig Island
- Dampalitan Island
- Fortune Island
- Ikulong Island
- Isla Puting Bato Island
- Lagdauin Island
- Lambauing Island
- Ligpo Island
- Malahi Island
- Malajibomanoc Island
- Mangayao Island
- Manlanat Island
- Maricaban Island
- Napayong Island
- Pagbilao Chica Island
- Pagbilao Grande Island
- Palasan Island
- Patayan Island
- Santa Amalia Island
- Sombrero Island
- Talabaan Islands
- Talim Island
- Twin Island
- Verde Island
- Volcano Island

== See also ==
- Geography of Manila
- List of islands of the Philippines
