= Isla Pulo =

Island in Manila Bay, Philippines

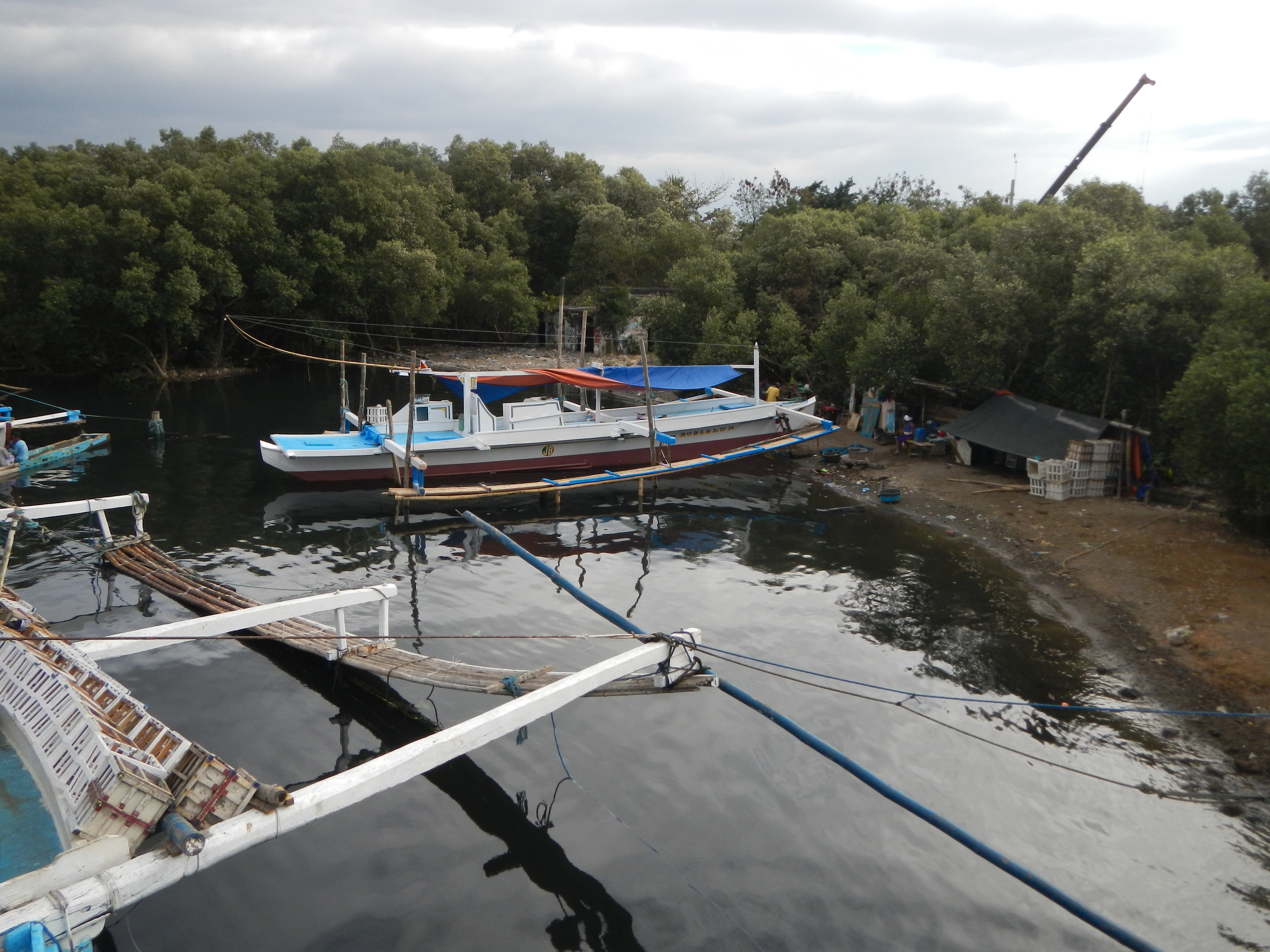
- The mangrove island in Tanza, Navotas

Geography
- Location: Navotas, Metro Manila
- Coordinates: 14°40′55″N 120°55′34″E
- Archipelago: Philippine Archipelago
- Area: 29.47 ha (72.8 acres)

Administration
- Philippines
- Barangay: Tanza

Demographics
- Population: 137 families

Pulo Island, commonly known as Isla Pulo, is a long, narrow island surrounded by mudflats in the Manila Bay coast of Navotas, about 13 kilometers (8.1 mi) north of Manila in the Philippines. It is a sitio in Barangay Tanza, connected to the mainland of Navotas by a 500-meter-long (1,600 ft) bamboo bridge. The island is known for its mangroves for which it was declared a "marine tree park" and as one of four ecotourism sites in Metro Manila established under the National Ecotourism Strategy in 1999. In 2014, it was home to a resettlement site of about 137 indigent families that mostly occupied the island's southern tip.

The island's name is tautological toponym, for "pulo" already means "island" in the Filipino language.

== Description ==
Isla Pulo runs along the coast of Manila Bay from the mouth of the Tangos River in Navotas to the village of Salambao at the city's border with Obando, Bulacan near the mouth of the Meycauayan River. It is about 2.1 kilometers (1.3 mi) long and 0.16 kilometers (0.099 mi) wide at its widest point, with an area of 29.47 hectares (72.8 acres). It is joined at low tide to the mainland of Navotas by intertidal mudflats.

The island is known to host the remaining old growth mangrove forest found in Metro Manila. Its mangroves and surrounding mudflats provide sanctuary for 11 species of migratory birds, including the Chinese egret, tern, kingfisher, gull and plover. The most common type of mangrove found on the island is the Avicennia rumphiana (bungalon). It is also inhabited by 3 species of crabs and 14 species of shellfish.

Until the 1980s, Isla Pulo contained long stretches of white sand beaches and thick mangrove vegetation. Its ecology changed with the arrival of informal settlers in the 1990s. The island had become heavily polluted, with trash from a nearby dumpsite washing up on its shores. Several mangrove trees were cut down for charcoal and many of the island's fauna were hunted for food. A campaign was launched in 2014 to declare the island a critical habitat and eco-tourism area in order to protect the remaining mangroves and restore the island's ecosystem.

All informal settlers on the island were relocated in 2016. A waterbird census conducted in January 2017 reported a sharp increase in the number of bird sightings in the island to 11,782 from 5,302 the previous year, which was attributed to the decline of disturbance following the relocation.

Sitio Pulo or Tanza Marine Tree Park is a 26-hectare beachfront, home of 70 migratory bird species and the oldest mangrove trees in Metro Manila. The wetlands is a habitat and feeding ground for diverse crustaceans and shellfish, such as the rare black-faced spoonbill, freshwater bivalve, pinnidae, barnacles], and saltwater clams. Its mudflats are birds’ pit stops. Currently, however, the Park and its mudflats are endangered by plastic pollution, while the ongoing Navotas City Coastal Bay Reclamation Project perils the biodiversity of the Navotas flatlands.

== See also ==
- Freedom Island
- List of islands in the Greater Manila Area
