= La Monja Island =

Island in Cavite City, Philippines

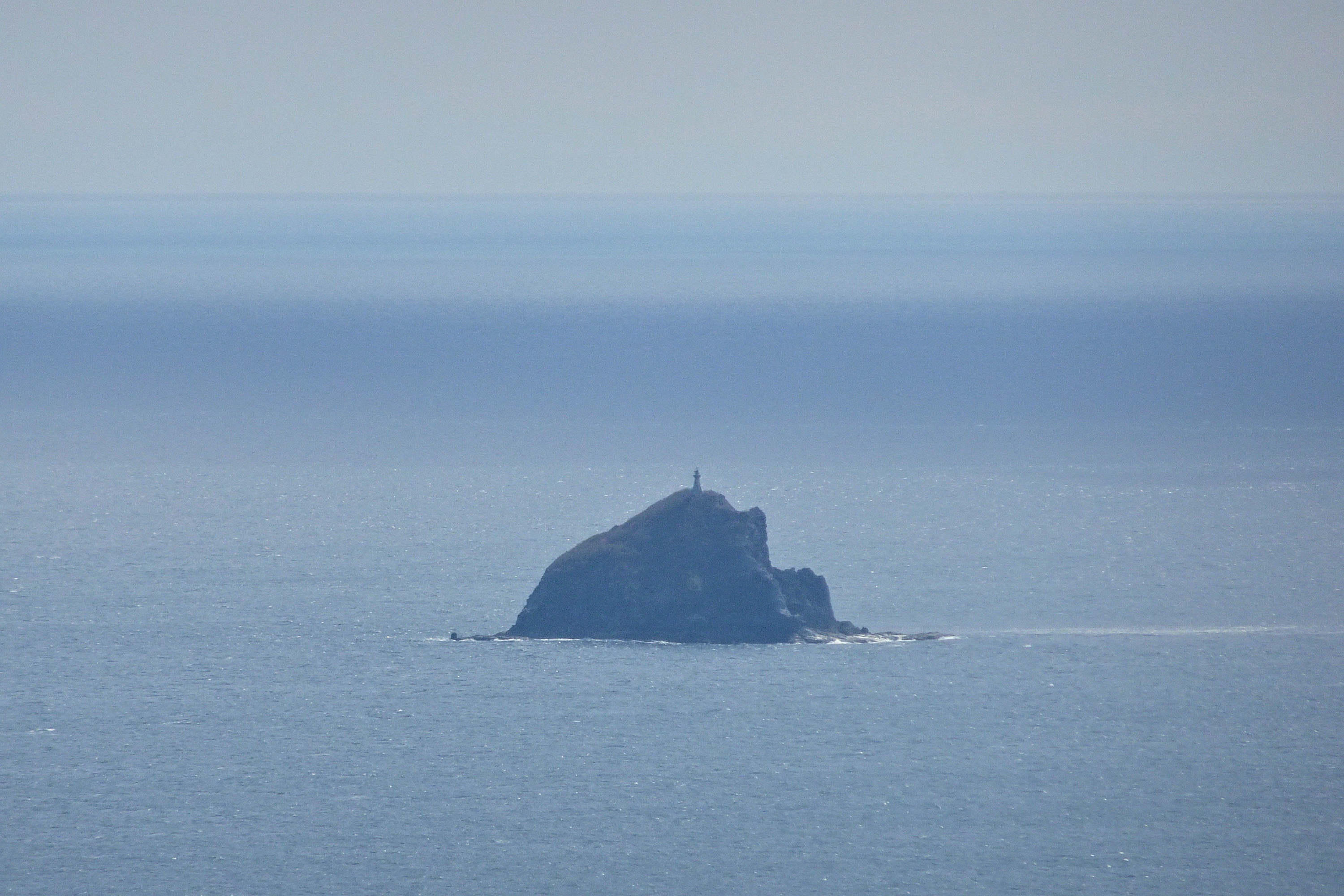

Geography
- Location: Manila Bay
- Coordinates: 14°22′32″N 120°31′19″E
- Adjacent to: South China Sea

Administration
- Philippines
- Region: Calabarzon
- Province: Cavite
- City: Cavite City

Demographics
- Population: uninhabited

La Monja Island (also Monja Island; Spanish: "the nun") is a small, uninhabited island near the entrance to Manila Bay in the Philippines. Falling under the political jurisdiction of Cavite City, it is located several kilometers southeast of Mariveles, Bataan, and 6.0 kilometers (3.7 mi) west from Corregidor lighthouse. It has remained untouched compared to other nearby islands, which have been used as military installations over the past four centuries.

== History ==
On May 18, 2012, a pilot and co-pilot were killed when an Aermacchi SF.260 plane belonging to the Philippine Air Force crashed close to the island.

== See also ==
- List of islands in the Greater Manila Area
- List of islands of the Philippines
- List of islands
- Desert island
