= Limbones Island =

Island in the Philippines

- Location within Philippines

Geography
- Coordinates: 14°14′10″N 120°35′27″E
- Adjacent to: South China Sea
- Area: 22.4 ha (55 acres)
- Highest elevation: 67 m (220 ft)

Administration
- Philippines
- Region: Calabarzon
- Province: Cavite
- Municipality: Maragondon

Limbones Island is an island located at the southern entrance of Manila Bay. It is also the furthest island from Metro Manila. It is under the jurisdiction of Maragondon, Cavite.

== Geography ==
Limbones Island and the other islands of Manila Bay fall under the jurisdiction of the Cavite province. It has a rocky landscape with the highest elevation located roughly at the island's center. It has an estimated area of 22.4 hectares (55 acres).

Due to its location as the farthest island from Metro Manila, it is the only island at the bay which was not turned into a fort by the Americans. Instead of fortifying the island, they built fire control stations, docking areas, concrete staircases, and a cable system.

== History ==
=== World War II ===
During World War II, the island served as the “eye” of the Filipino and American forces guarding Manila Bay so it can see 3.9 kilometres (2.4 mi) further out into the mouth of Manila Bay from Fort Frank. This is because it is situated at the bay's very entrance, making ships coming from the South China Sea visible from anyone standing on the island. The island endured multiple bombings by Japanese forces during the height of the war. However, nobody was permanently stationed on the island during the time of the bombings.

== Ecosystems ==
=== Biology ===
The sea floor 15 feet below is dotted with live and healthy corals. It has many coral varieties, fish species, and amazing crustaceans, including the mantis shrimp, a type of shrimp that possesses a set of multi-colored exoskeleton.

== See also ==
- List of islands in the Greater Manila Area
- Manila Bay
