= La Mesa Dam and Reservoir =

La Mesa Dam
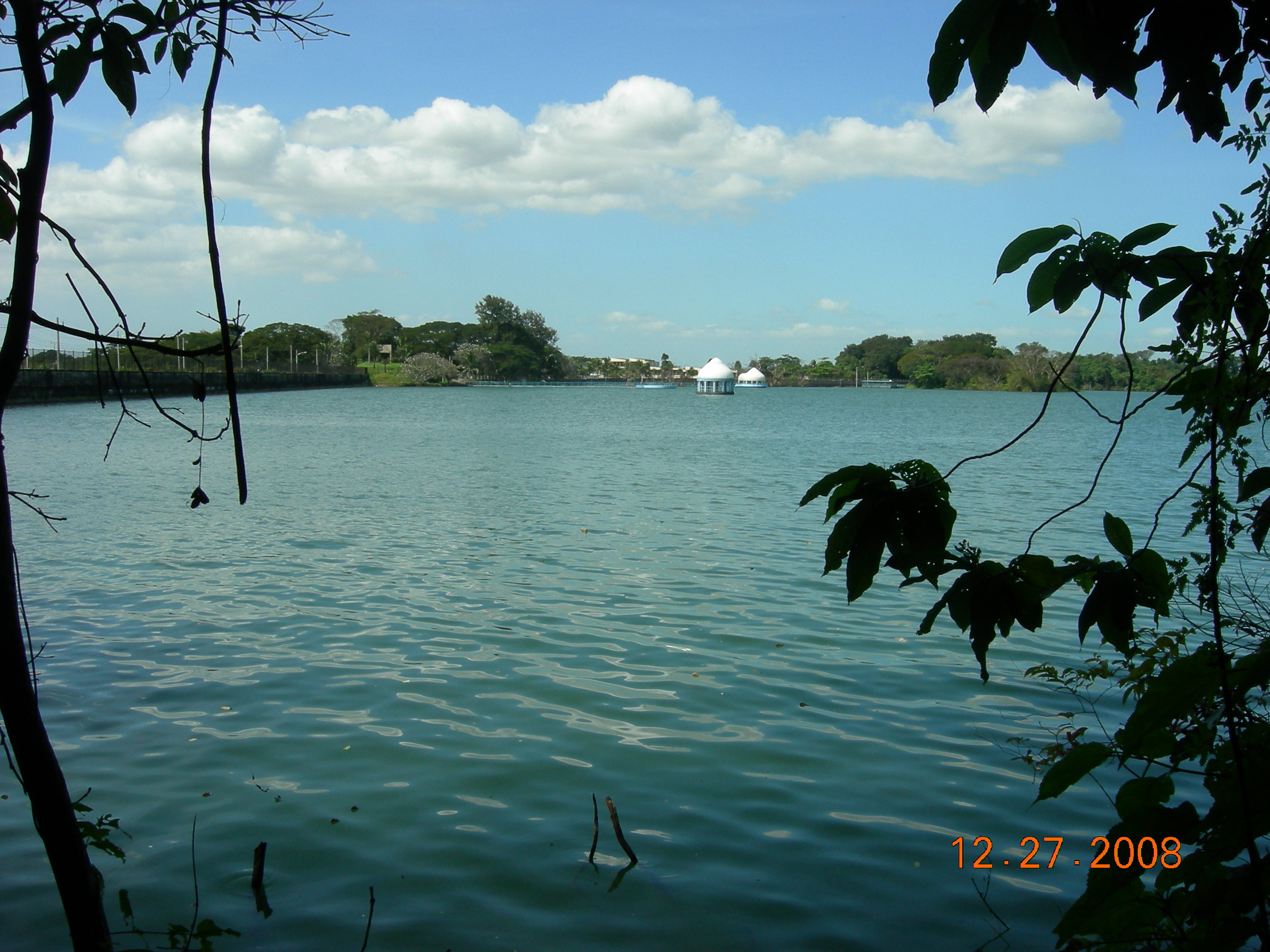
- La Mesa Reservoir

- Location in Metro Manila Location in Luzon Location in the Philippines
- Location: Greater Lagro, Quezon City, Philippines
- Coordinates: 14°42′59″N 121°04′21″E
- Purpose: Water supply
- Status: Operational
- Opening date: 1929
- Built by: Manila Water District
- Operator: Metropolitan Waterworks and Sewerage System

Dam and spillways
- Type of dam: Earth fill dam
- Impounds: Tullahan River
- Height: 24 meters (79 ft)
- Elevation at crest: 82.5 meters (271 ft)

Reservoir
- Creates: La Mesa Reservoir
- Total capacity: 50.5 million m^{3} (1,780 million ft^{3})
- Catchment area: 27 square kilometers (10 sq mi)

The La Mesa Dam and Reservoir is an earth dam that impounds the Tullahan River in Quezon City, Philippines. Its reservoir can hold up to 50.5 million cubic meters (1,780 million cubic feet), occupying an area of 27 square kilometers (10 sq mi). It is part of the Angat-Ipo-La Mesa water system, which supplies most of the water in Metro Manila.

== History ==
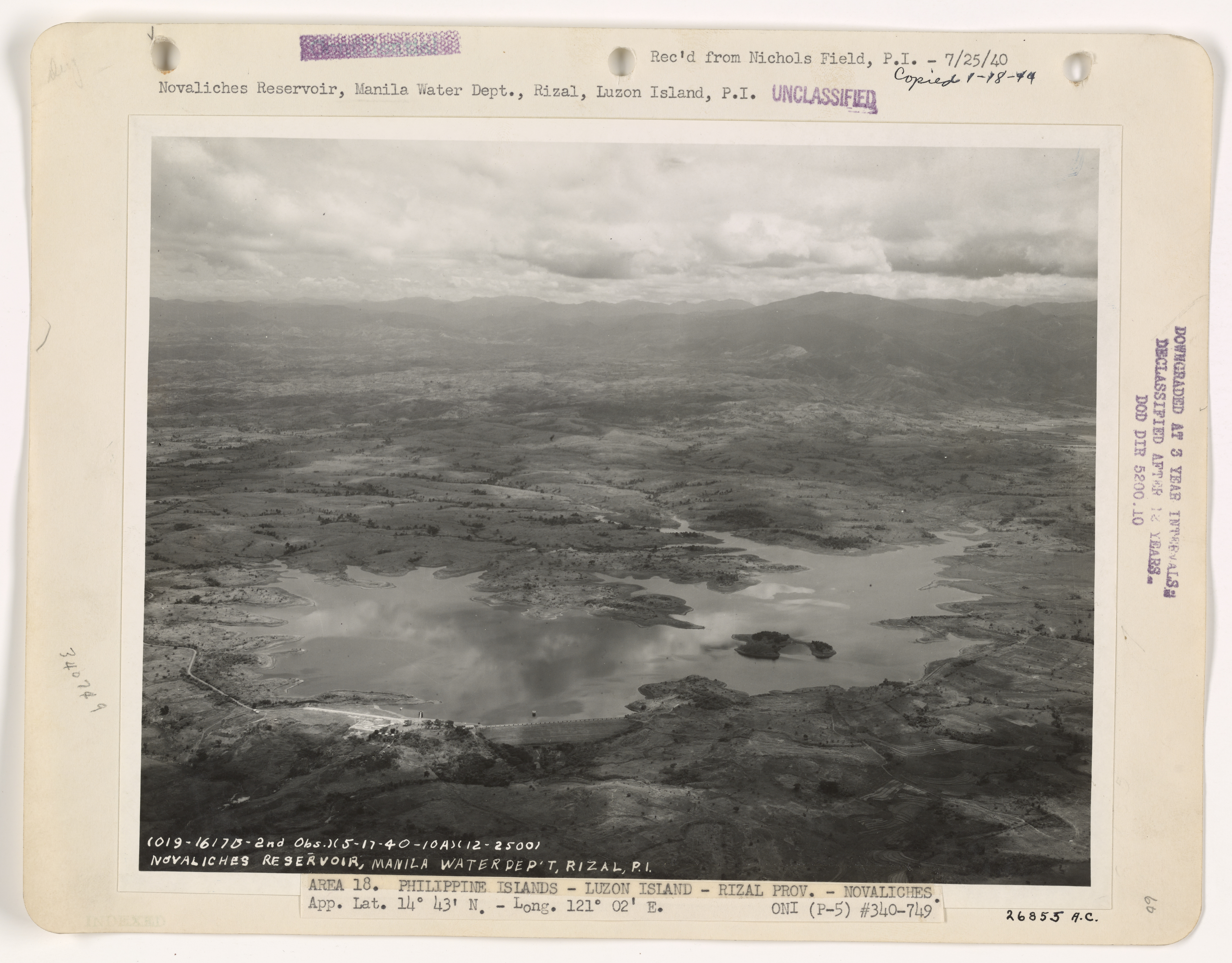
Aerial view of Novaliches Reservoir, 1940

The La Mesa Dam was constructed in 1929 as the Novaliches Reservoir during the American colonial era in the Philippines. Sometime between 1920 and 1926, the Metropolitan Water District (a predecessor agency of the Metropolitan Waterworks and Sewerage System) decided to build a replacement for the old Wawa Dam in Montalban, Rizal. The Wawa Dam which served Manila and surrounding locales had to be replaced due to the growing population of the Manila area.

The La Mesa Dam was built in Novaliches, which was then in the municipality of Caloocan due to the sloping topography of the watershed area from Bulacan. The dam later became part of a larger system with the opening of Ipo Dam in Norzagaray, Bulacan in 1936, and Angat Dam in the same locale in 1967.

The La Mesa Dam was raised in 1959 to increase the reservoir's maximum capacity to its current level.

== Dam ==
The La Mesa Dam is an earth dam or a terrain dam (caldera alike) with a height of 24 meters (79 ft). The elevation at its crest is 82.5 meters (271 ft) while the elevation at its overflow section is 80.15 meters (263.0 ft). These elevations can be observed from SM Fairview Mall, the Basement Level and First Floor at the Round about going bayan.

== Reservoir ==
The La Mesa Reservoir has a maximum capacity of about 50.5 million cubic meters (1,780 million cubic feet). Water from the reservoir spills into the Tullahan River that passes Brgy. Nova Proper (commonly called Bayan) which transports the water to Manila Bay.

== Administration ==
The La Mesa Watershed Reservation which hosts the dam and reservoir is jointly administered, supervised, and controlled by the Department of Environment and Natural Resources of the Philippine national government and the is under the joint administration, supervision and control of the (DENR) and the Metropolitan Waterworks and Sewerage System (MWSS).

== Water supply ==
Metro Manila and its surrounding areas are divided into two water concessionaires: Maynilad Water (red) and Manila Water (blue).

The La Mesa Dam is part of the Angat-Ipo-La Mesa water system which supplies water to Metro Manila and surrounding provinces.

The water collected in the reservoir is treated at the La Mesa and Balara Treatment Plants. The La Mesa facility has a designed capacity of 2,400 million litres per day (mld) and serves the western half of Metro Manila, while the Balara facility has a capacity of 1,600 mld and handles the remaining eastern section.

Whenever the dam’s water level drops below the critical mark of 69 meters (226 ft), the MWSS, Maynilad, and Manila Water begin regulating water dispensed to customers.

== Areas potentially affected by spills ==
Because the dam is designed to overflow into the Tullahan River, spills from the dam in cases of extreme weather affect the cities of Malabon, Navotas, Quezon City (especially the Fairview area near the watershed) and Valenzuela.

== See also ==
- Water supply and sanitation in the Philippines
- Energy in the Philippines
- List of lakes in the Philippines
- La Mesa Watershed
- La Mesa Mead
