= Tanza, Navotas =

Tanza
- Barangay
- Barangay Tanza
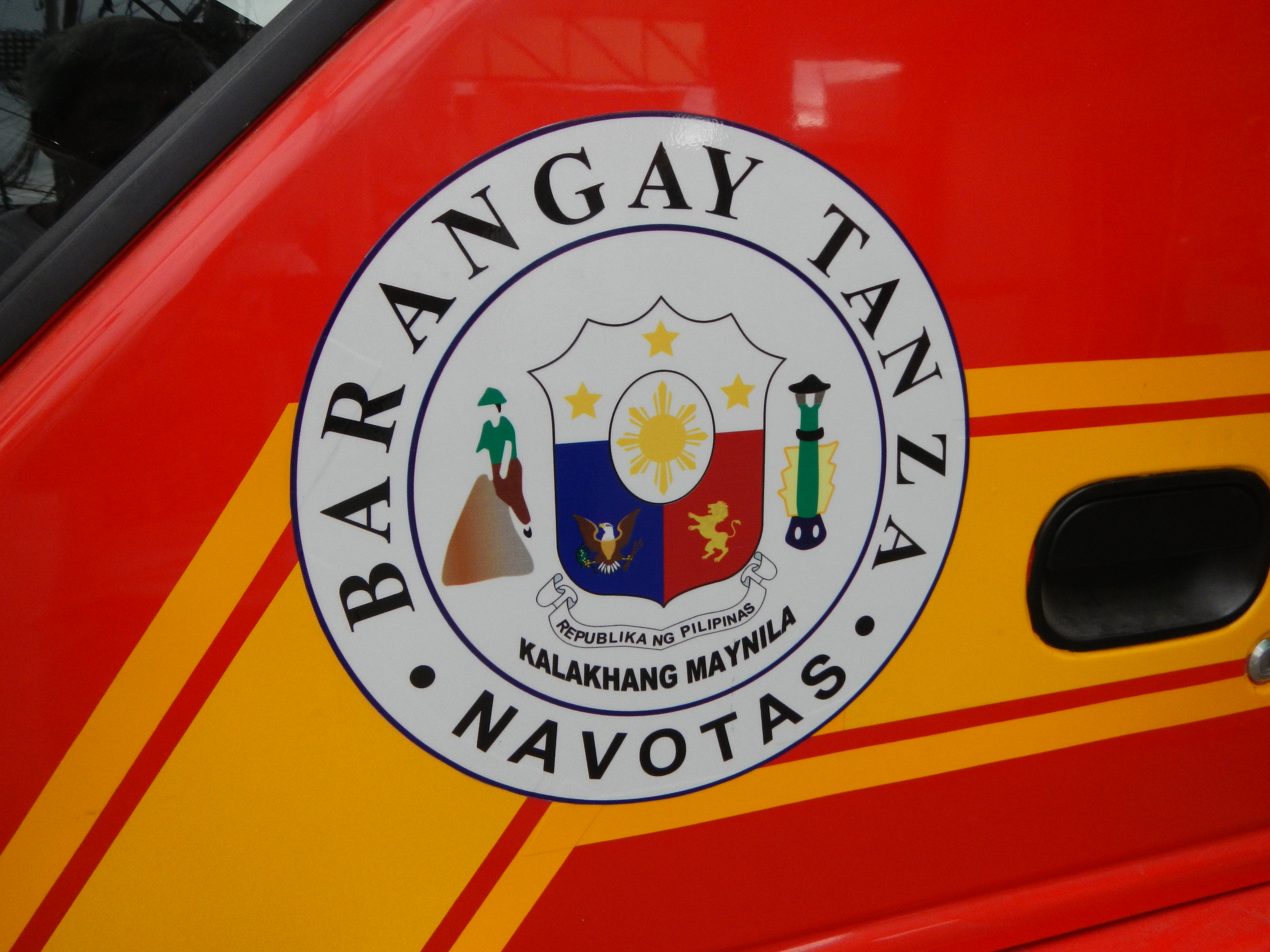
- Seal
- Interactive map of Tanza
- Coordinates: 14.679060°N 120.937100°E
- Country: Philippines
- Region: National Capital Region
- City: Navotas
- Congressional districts: Lone district of Navotas
- Disestablished: 2017
- ZIP code: 1490

Tanza was one of the fourteen barangays of the city of Navotas in Metro Manila, Philippines. It occupied the northernmost portion of the city including Isla Pulo which is separated from the city proper, and was bounded by Brgy. Binauangan and Salambao in Obando, Bulacan to the north, Manila Bay and Brgy. San Roque to the west, Brgy. Hulong Duhat and Dampalit, Malabon to the east and Brgy. Tangos North to the south.

On August 23, 2017, Republic Act No. 10935 was approved, dividing Tanza into barangays Tanza 1 and Tanza 2. It was ratified in a plebiscite on January 5, 2018, the same date of plebiscite for the ratification of two other similar laws – Republic Act No. 10933 that split Barangay North Bay Boulevard South (NBBS) into NBBS Proper, NNBS Kaunlaran, and NBBS Dagat-Dagatan; and Republic Act No. 10934 that partitioned Barangay Tangos into Tangos North and Tangos South.

Both Tanza 1 and Tanza 2 are accessible via Badeo 5 in Brgy. San Roque, Navotas and the Tanza-Malabon bridge in Brgy. Hulong Duhat, Malabon.
