= Tullahan River =

River in the National Capital Region, Philippines

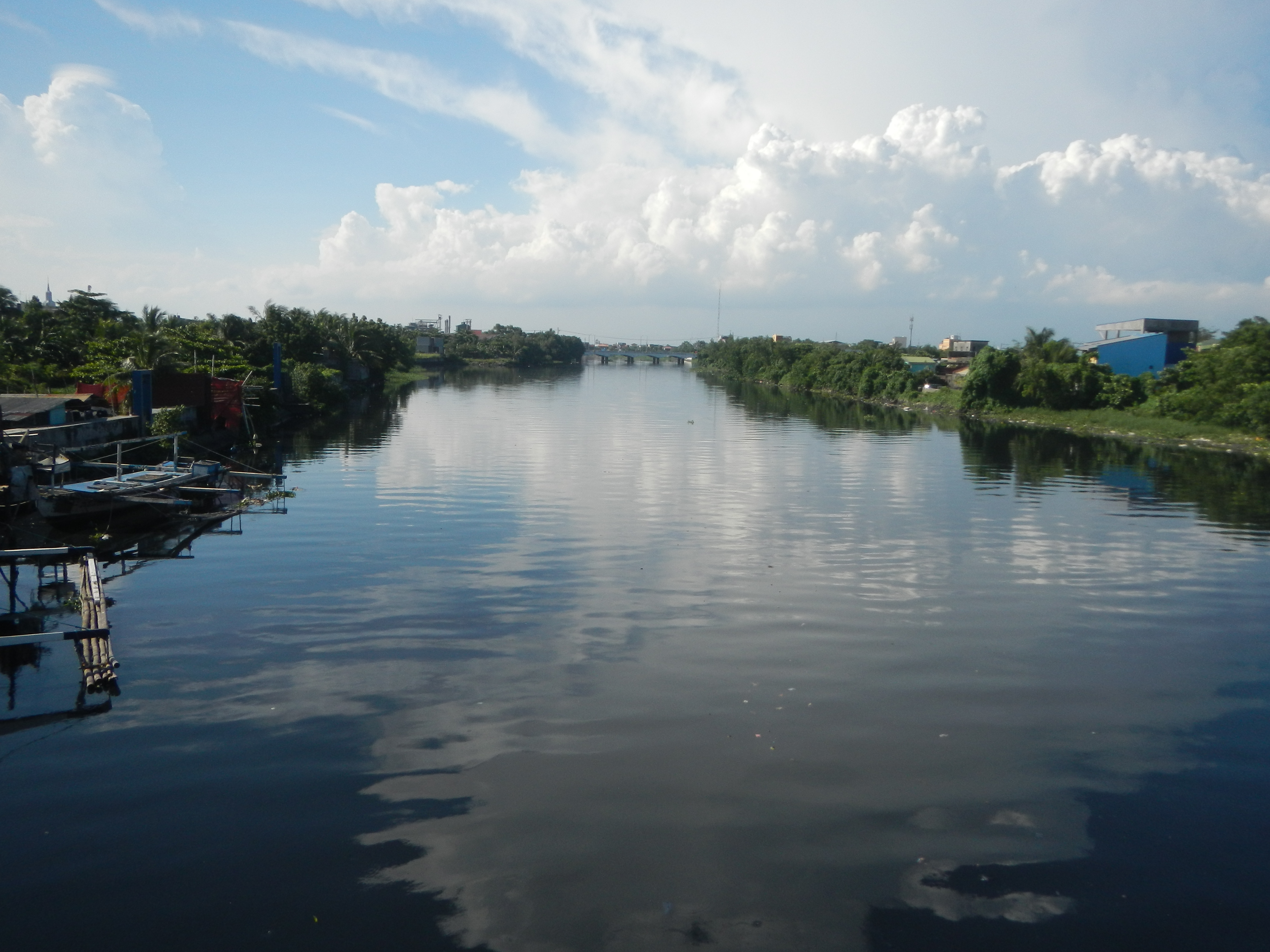
- The river in 2017

- Location within Luzon Location within Philippines

Location
- Country: Philippines
- Region: National Capital Region
- Cities: Quezon City; Caloocan; Malabon; Valenzuela; Navotas

Physical characteristics
- Source: La Mesa Dam
  - location: Quezon City
- Mouth: Manila Bay
  - location: Navotas
  - coordinates: 14°39′00″N 120°56′53″E
- Length: 27.1 km (16.8 mi)

Basin features
- Tributaries
  - left: Dampalit River, Polo River

The Tullahan River is a river in the Philippines. It is located to the north of Manila and has an approximate length of 27.1 kilometers (16.8 mi). It starts at the La Mesa Reservoir in Quezon City and flows through Caloocan, Malabon, Valenzuela, and Navotas and empties into Manila Bay. In 2019, San Miguel Corporation pledged ₱1 billion for the cleanup of the Tullahan River as part of the Manila Bay rehabilitation effort.

== History ==
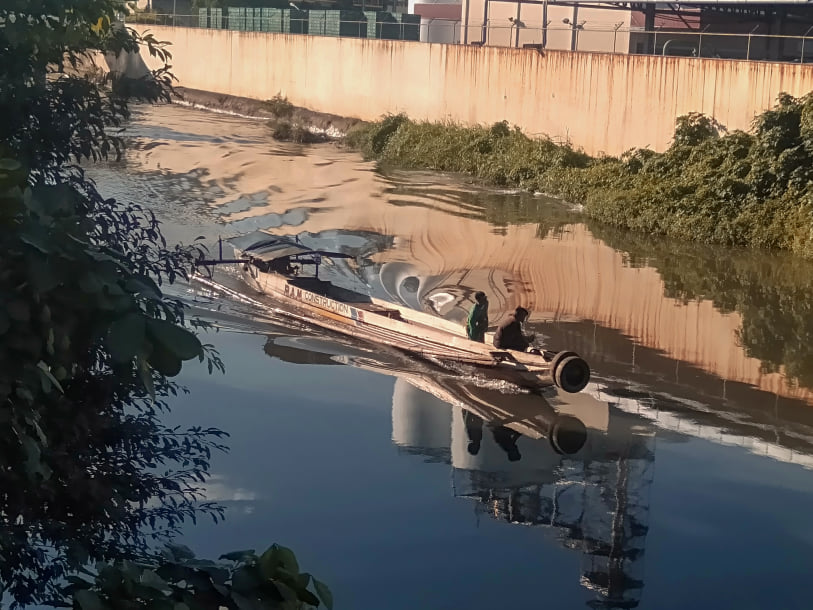
A boat on the Tullahan River, straddling the border between Malabon and Valenzuela.

On June 15, 1995, the Metropolitan Manila Development Authority (MMDA) finished their clean-up of the Tullahan River.

== Bridges ==
=== Navotas ===
- R-10 Bridge (C-4 - R-10)
- Bangkulasi Bridge

=== Malabon ===
- C-4 Bridge I
- Malabon Bridge
- Lambingan Bridge
- Tinajeros Bridge
- Harbor Link Bridge - includes the rail bridge of PNR

=== Valenzuela-Malabon ===
- Tullahan Bridge (MacArthur Highway)
- White Lily Bridge

=== Valenzuela-Caloocan (South) ===
- Tullahan Bridge (North Luzon Expressway)
- Ugong Bridge
- Doña Candida Bridge

=== Valenzuela-Quezon City ===
- Maceda Bridge
- Tullahan Bridge 3 (Mindanao Avenue)

=== Quezon City ===
- Katipunan Bridge
- San Dionisio Bridge
- Gozum Bridge
- Tullahan I Bridge (Quirino Highway)
- Forest Hill Bridge
- Bagong Tulay Bridge
- Accountant Street Bridge
- Tullahan II Bridge (Commonwealth Avenue)
- Capri Bridge (in construction)

== See also ==
- List of rivers and esteros in Manila
