= Manila Bay =

Natural harbor on the island of Luzon, Philippines

- Look ng Maynila (Filipino)
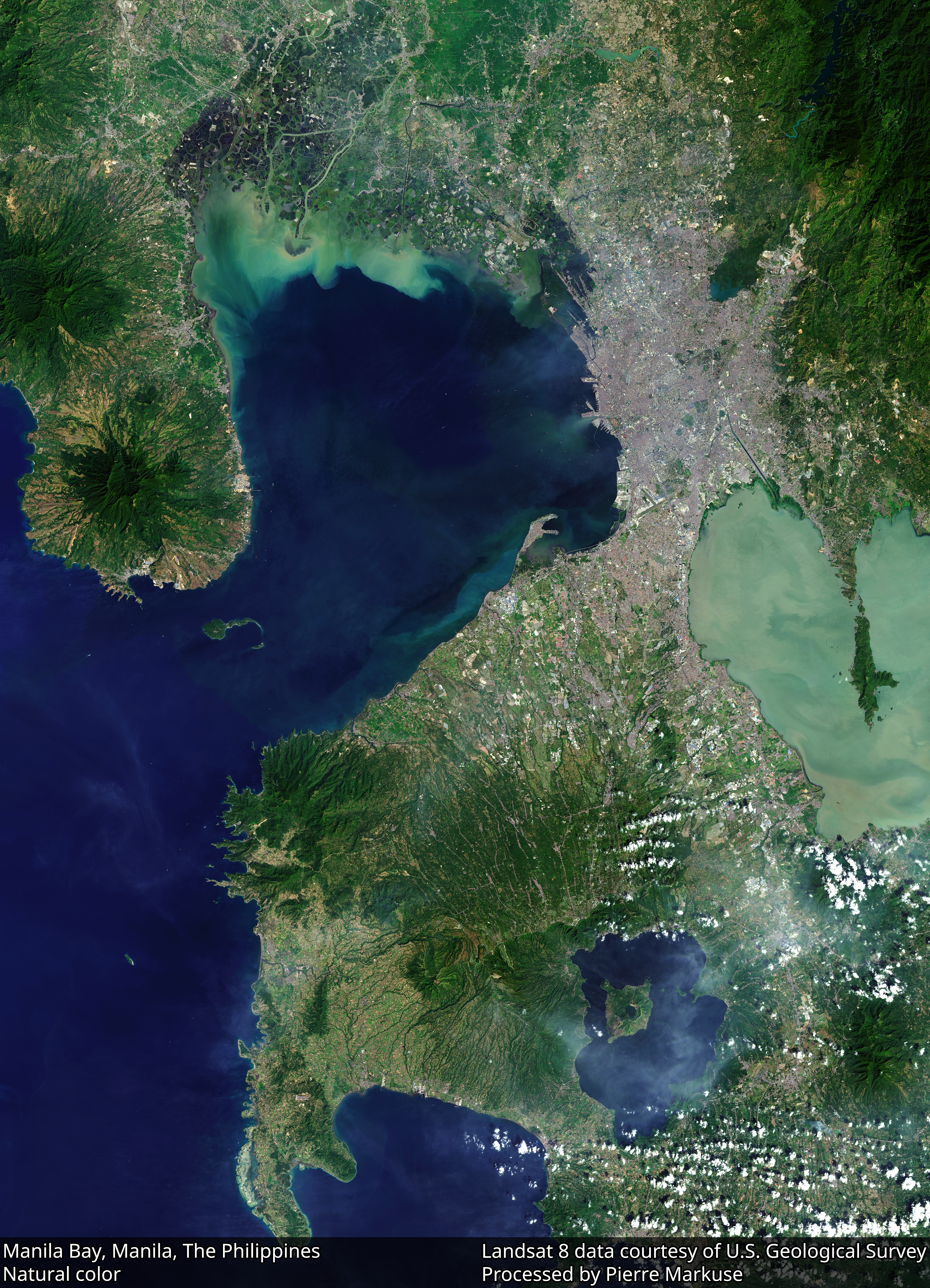
- Satellite image of Manila Bay (upper half of photo) in 2016

- Location in Luzon Location in the Philippines
- Location: Luzon, Philippines
- Coordinates: 14°31′00″N 120°46′00″E
- River sources: Imus River; Zapote River; San Juan River; Malimango River; Cañas River; Timalan River; Labac River; Maragondon River; Pasig River; Tullahan River; Angat River; Pampanga River
- Max. length: 19 km (12 mi)
- Max. width: 48 km (30 mi)
- Surface area: 2,000 km^{2} (770 sq mi)
- Islands: Caballo Island; Carabao Island; Corregidor; El Fraile Island; La Monja; Limbones Island
- Settlements: Abucay; Bacoor; Balanga; Bulakan; Cavite City; Hagonoy; Hermosa; Kawit; Las Piñas; Limay; Lubao; Macabebe; Malolos; Manila; Maragondon; Mariveles; Naic; Navotas; Noveleta; Obando; Orani; Orion; Paombong; Parañaque; Pasay; Pilar; Rosario; Samal; Sasmuan; Tanza; Ternate

Manila Bay (Filipino: Look ng Maynila; Spanish: Bahía de Manila) is a natural harbor that serves the Port of Manila (on Luzon), in the Philippines. Strategically located around the capital city of the Philippines, Manila Bay facilitated commerce and trade between the Philippines and its neighboring countries, becoming the gateway for socio-economic development even prior to the Spanish period. With an area of 1,994 km^{2} (769.9 sq mi), and a coastline of 190 km (118.1 mi), Manila Bay is situated in the western part of Luzon and is bounded by Cavite and Metro Manila on the east, Bulacan and Pampanga on the north, and Bataan on the west and northwest. Manila Bay drains approximately 17,000 km^{2} (6,563.7 sq mi) of watershed area, with the Pampanga River contributing about 49% of the freshwater influx. With an average depth of 17 m (55.8 ft), it is estimated to have a total volume of 28.9×10^{9} m^{3} (1,020×10^{9} ft^{3}). Entrance to the bay is 19 km (11.8 mi) wide and expands to a width of 48 km (29.8 mi). However, the width of the bay varies from 22 km (13.7 mi) at its mouth and expanding to 60 km (37.3 mi) at its widest point.

The islands of Corregidor and Caballo divide the entrance into two channels, about 2 mi (3.2 km) towards the North and 6.5 mi (10.5 km) wide on the South side. Mariveles, in the province of Bataan, is an anchorage just inside the northern entrance and Sangley Point is the former location of Cavite Naval Base. On either side of the bay are volcanic peaks topped with tropical foliage: 40 km to the north is the Bataan Peninsula and to the south is the province of Cavite.

Across the entrance to Manila Bay are several islands, the largest of which is Corregidor, located 3 kilometers from Bataan and, along with the island of Caballo, separates the mouth of the bay into the North and South Channels. In the south channel is El Fraile Island and outside the entrance, and to the south, is Carabao Island. El Fraile, a rocky island some 4 acres (1.6 ha) in area, supports the massive concrete and steel ruins of Fort Drum, an island fortress constructed by the United States Army to defend the southern entrance of the bay. To the immediate north and south are additional harbors, upon which both local and international ports are situated. Large numbers of ships at the North and South harbors facilitate maritime activities in the bay. Being smaller of the two harbors, the North Harbor is used for inter-island shipping while the South Harbor is used for large ocean-going vessels.

== History ==
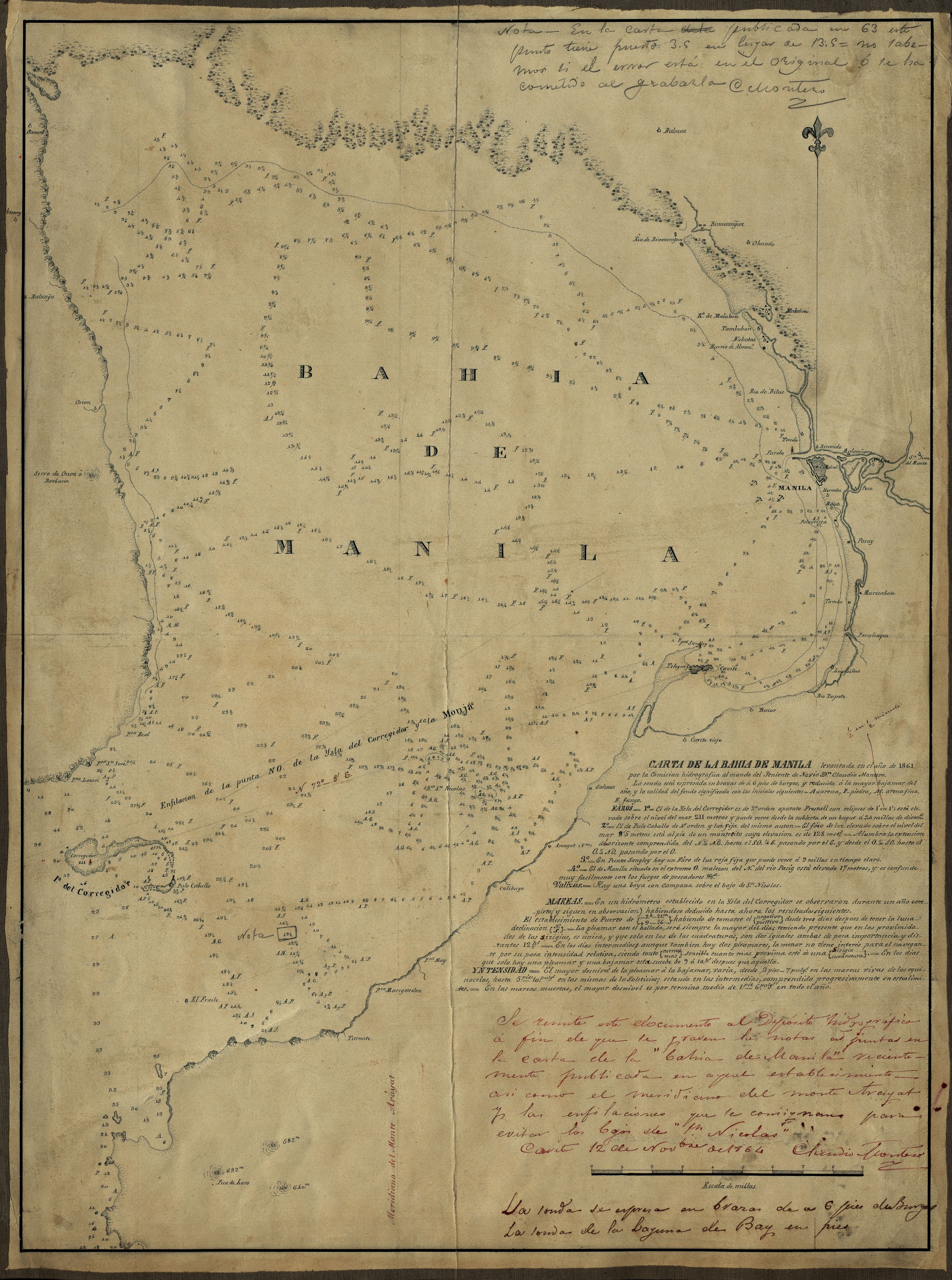
1861 map of Manila Bay

Manila Bay was connected to Laguna de Bay (pronounced "bai") approximately 3,000 years ago. Recurring episodic uplifts along the West Marikina Valley Fault caused the two to break up. Interaction between Manila Bay and Laguna de Bay today occurs only through the Pasig River, an estuary running approximately east-west axis across Metro Manila. The bay was the setting for the Battle of Manila Bay in 1898, in which American troops led by Commodore George Dewey seized the area. This battle showcased the United States' naval strength, while major Spanish ships were destroyed and captured. With its proud historic past and abundant marine life, Manila Bay became the ocean portal and Filipino epicenter for government, economy and industry. During the Russo-Japanese War at the close of the Battle of Tsushima in 1905, three surviving Russian protected cruisers (the Aurora, Zhemchug, and Oleg) managed to make port in then-United States-controlled Manila for repairs. However, because the U.S. was neutral in this conflict, the trio of warships and their crews remained interned by the U.S. until the war officially came to an end in September 1905. During the World War II, Corregidor Island was captured by Imperial Japanese forces based in Manila Bay. Various other battles were fought in the bay, including the Battles of La Naval de Manila in 1646, which finally ended the Dutch Republic's attempts to seize the Philippines.

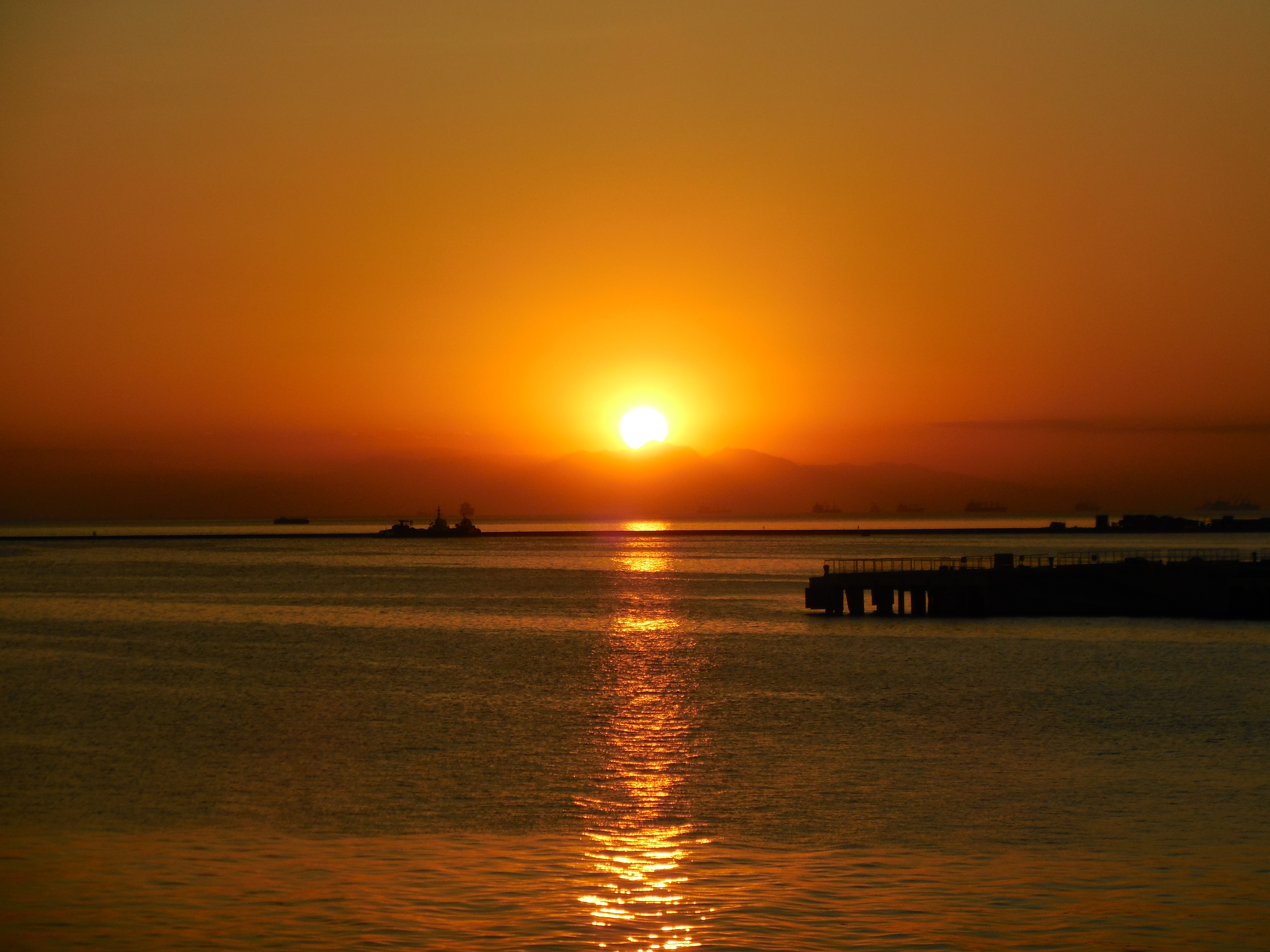
Sunset at Manila Bay

The bay remains important for commerce and industry, including fishing, although rapid urban growth and industrialization are contributing to a decline in water quality and deteriorating marine habitats. It also serves a focus for recreation for Metro Manila and is a popular destination for walks and for viewing the sunset. Much of the land fronting the bay along Metro Manila is reclaimed land which now includes important sites such as the Philippine Senate and the Mall of Asia.

On September 27, 2011, the sea walls of Manila Bay were destroyed by the storm surge caused by Typhoon Pedring. Even the United States Embassy, Museo Pambata and then-Sofitel Philippine Plaza were submerged by the flooding. It was estimated that the damage would cost ₱30 million to repair. In April 2012, the sea walls were once again opened to the public, having been redesigned to withstand a strong storm surge.

== Ecosystem ==
Coastal and marine habitats in the area include upland forests, mangroves, mudflats, sandy beaches, sea grass and coral reefs.

=== Biodiversity ===
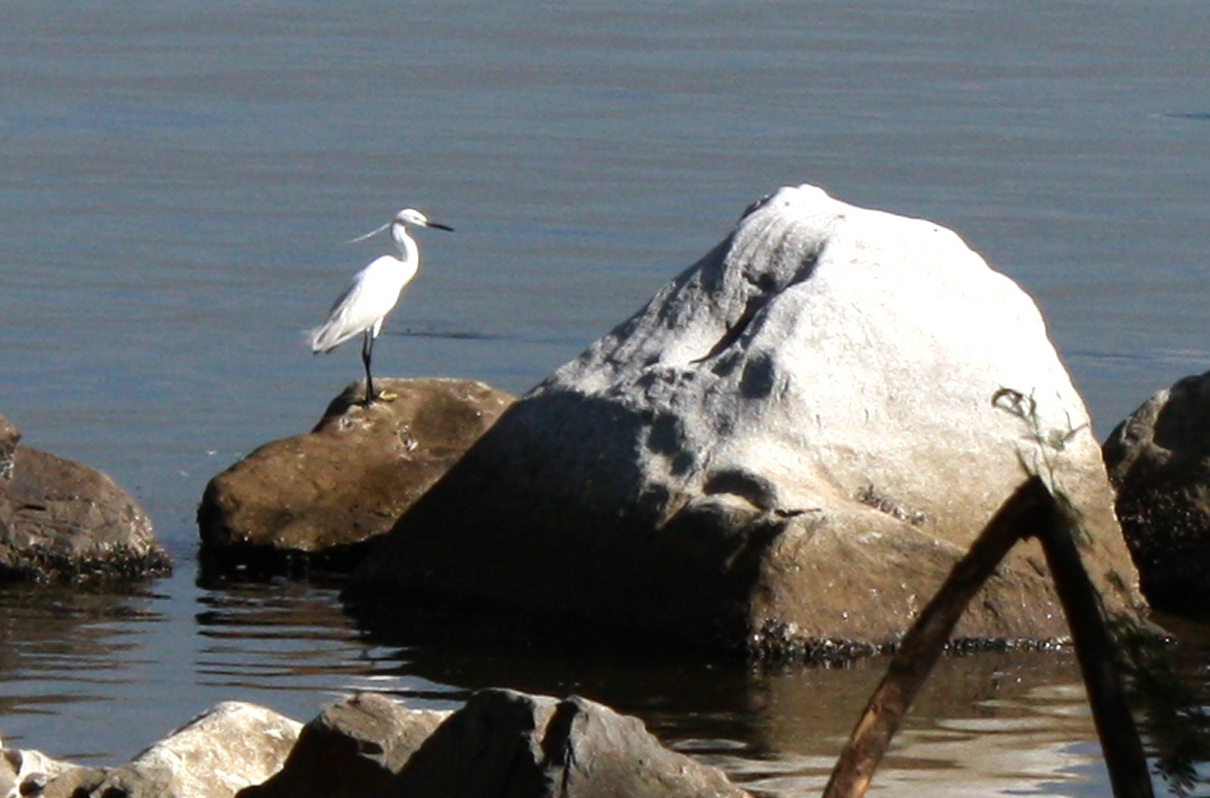
An egret in a mangrove area along Manila Bay.

A total of 19,139 birds belonging to 330 families and 99 species were observed at various monitoring sites along the bay area. The endangered Chinese Egret (Egretta eulophotes) and Black-winged cuckoo-shrike were sighted in the area. A large number of migratory birds, catfish and mackerels were once abundant in these waters. Their decline ushered in the appearance of squid, shrimp, and small pelagic species such as herrings and anchovies.

=== Mangroves ===
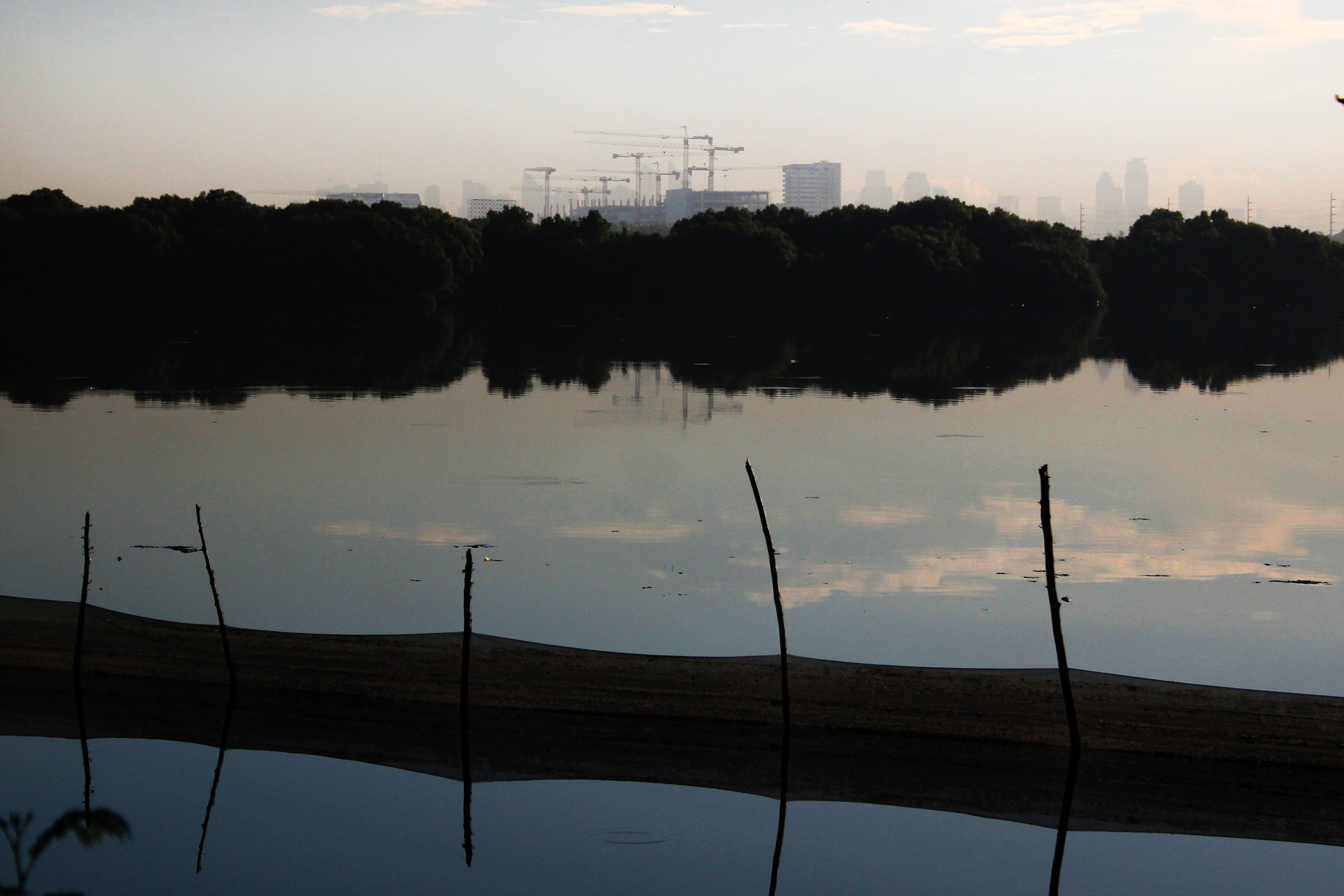
Mangrove trees along Manila Bay.

The mangrove ecosystem around Manila Bay has both ecological and socioeconomic uses with its association of unique plant and animal species. Of the original 54,000 hectares (130,000 acres) of mangroves existing at the turn of the 20th century, only 794 hectares (1,960 acres) are remaining as recorded in 1995. A few of the mangrove swamps remaining in Pampanga Bay are of considerable value for research and conservation education. As natural habitats, mangroves considerably help in acting as a protective buffer against cyclones and storms.

Predominant in the bay area are Avicennia marina (gray or white mangrove) together with 15 species of mangroves belonging to nine families that grow there. In the Bataan area, species of mangrove swamps that are found thriving include:

- Rhizophora apiculata (bakhaw lalaki in Filipino)
- Rhizophora mucronata (Asiatic mangrove)
- Avicennia marina (gray or white mangrove)
- Nypa fruticans (nipa palm)
- Sonneratia alba (no common name)
- Scyphiphora hydrophyllacea (nilad in Filipino)
- Sonneratia acida (pagatpat in Filipino)
- Acanthus ilicifolius (holly-leaved acanthus)
- Excoecaria agallocha (milky mangrove)

Plantations of Cocos nucifera (coconut palm) co-exists with the mangroves found in these areas.

=== Wetlands ===
Covering about 46,000 hectares (110,000 acres), wetlands around Manila Bay are useful in:

- providing food and habitat for fish, shorebirds and wildlife;
- maintaining and improving the water quality of rivers, lakes and estuaries,
- acting as reservoirs for watersheds, and
- protecting adjacent and downstream properties of the area from potential flood damage

Mudflats, sand flats, swamps, beaches and rocky shores form part of the wetlands in Manila Bay. Found mostly along the coast of Bataan and Pampanga, mudflats are suitable habitats for shellfish.

=== Coral reefs ===
Contributing to the balanced functioning of the ecosystem around Manila Bay, coral reefs in the area provide sanctuary for fishes. Consequently, its decline through the years has directly affected fish yield.

=== Seagrass beds ===
As a diverse ecosystem, seagrass beds provide shelter for fishes and other marine life forms. Like the coral reefs, most of the seagrass beds in Manila Bay are found near its mouth, most notably in the areas of Malolos, Orion, Mariveles, and Corregidor Island.

=== Upland forests ===
Within the watershed of Manila Bay upland forests abound which are sources of food, timber, fuel wood and other products, as well as habitats for wildlife. These forests provide protection from soil erosion and help maintain the water levels and water quality in rivers and streams. Mount Makiling, Angat Dam watershed, La Mesa Dam watershed, Mounts Palay-Palay/Mataas na Gulod, Mount Arayat and other portions of national parks located in Bataan, Bulacan, Rizal and Tarlac form part of these upland forest ecosystem.

== Key developments ==
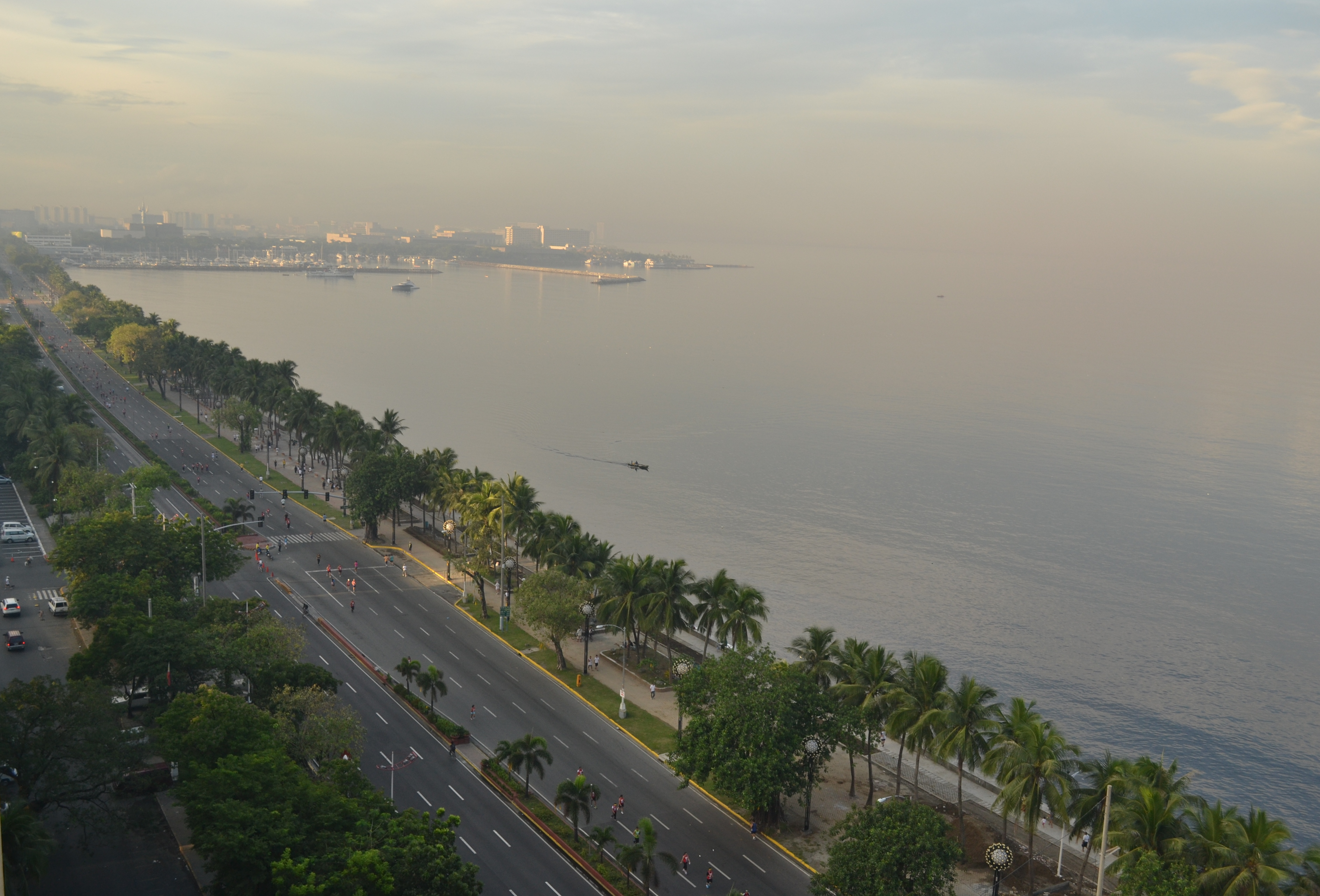
Roxas Boulevard on the eastern shore of Manila Bay

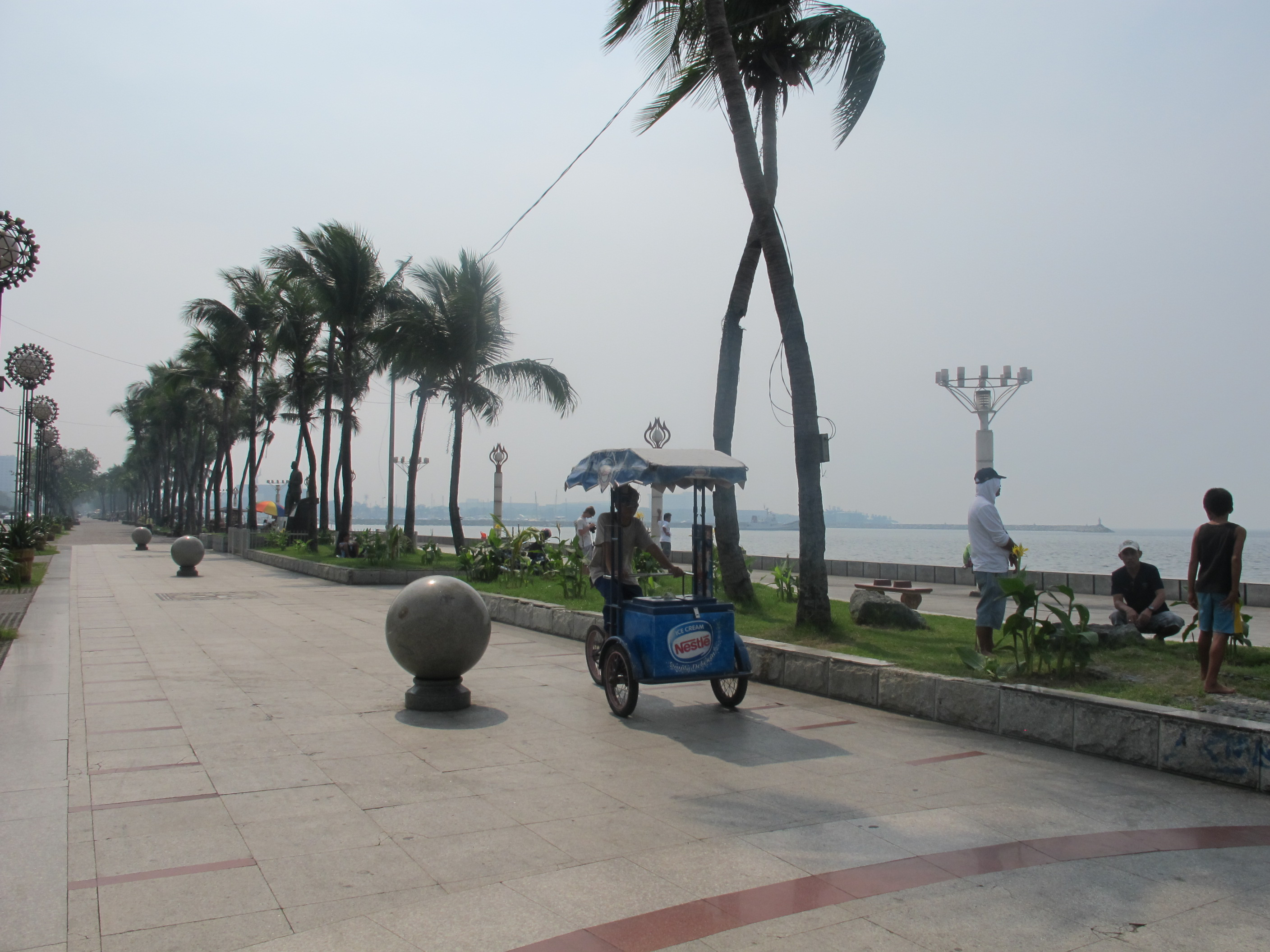
The Baywalk.

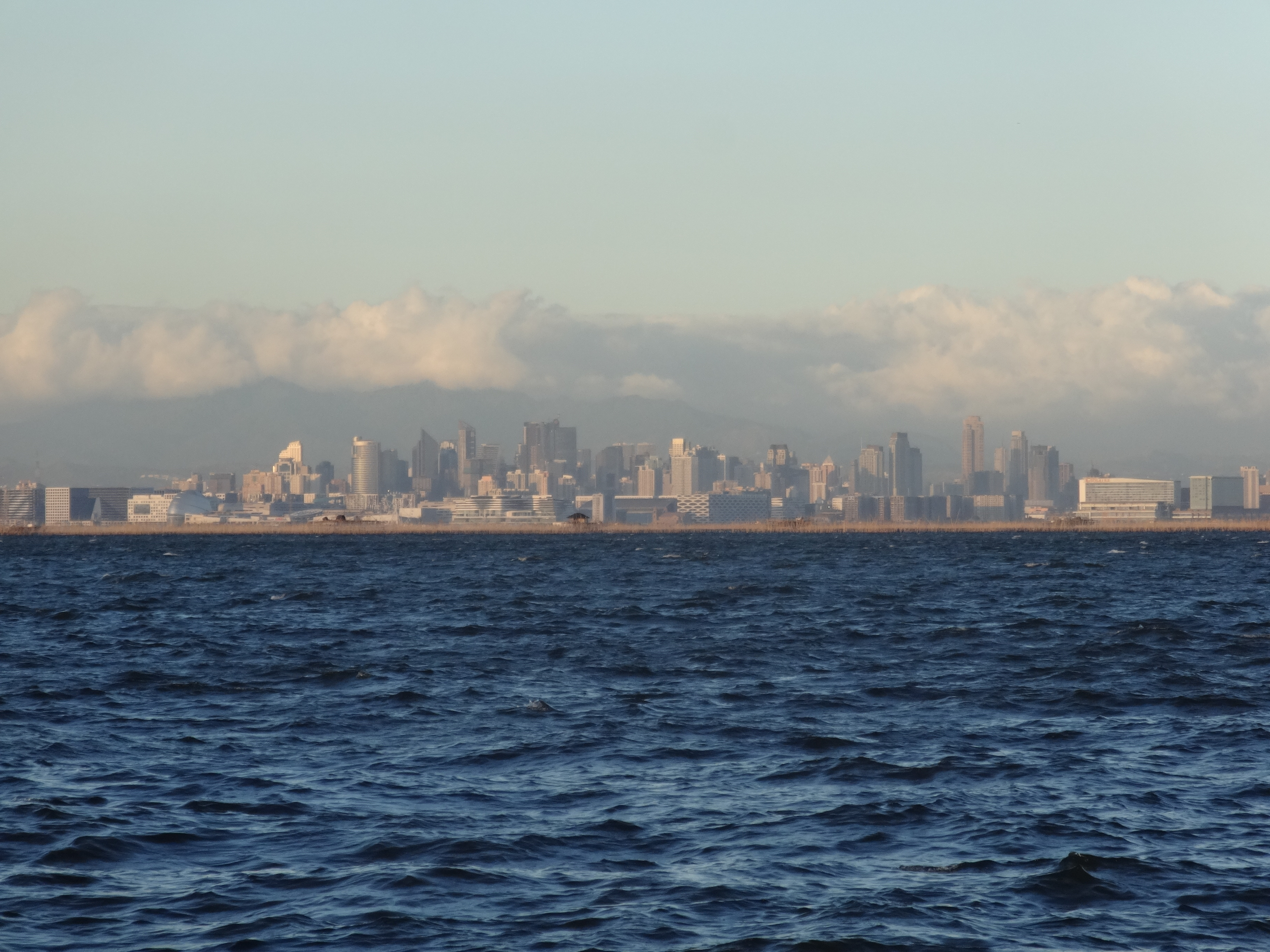
Manila skyline from Manila Bay

=== Land reclamation ===
Largely intended for use in human settlement and industrial development, land reclamation projects contributed to the reduction of mangroves around the area, as well as significant reduction in Metro Manila's shoreline. From 1944 to 1991, approximately 600 meters (2,000 ft) of shoreline have been reclaimed in the northern part. In 2009, the Pambansang Lakas ng Kilusang Mamamalakaya ng Pilipinas (Pamalakaya) said that there are 7,000 hectares (17,000 acres) of foreshore areas in Cavite and 5,000 hectares (12,000 acres) of shallow coastal waters to expand Sangley Point naval base as part of reclamation projects, which are mostly funded by foreign investors.

=== Land conversion ===
Conversion of mangrove and mudflat areas into fishponds have impacted the physical features of the bay whereby what used to be irregular shoreline in 1944 has become more linear by 1977. Shoreline retreat continued as man-made structures such as fish pens occupied coastal areas, with progradation dominant from 1977 to 1991. Most areas of the bay, except those near the ports, are largely used as a major fishing ground, with fisheries and aquaculture as the dominant source of livelihood for the inhabitants in the coastal areas.

From 1990, approximately 1,200 hectares of mangroves were cleared, with the land converted for aquaculture or used as salt beds. In 1993 much of the fisheries resources steadily declined due to overfishing and overharvesting.

=== Waterfront development ===
With then Mayor Lito Atienza's program Buhayin ang Maynila (Revitalize Manila) in 2002, the local government made the initiative of enhancing the seaside promenade of Manila through urban renewal, upkeep and improvements. What later became known as Baywalk, the facelift of the 2 km strip of central public space aimed at creating a venue for social interaction and recreation.

With reference to its colonial history, Manila's waterfront expresses power through the dominant classes which uses the Baywalk for exercise, fishing or socialization. The mix of land utilization and social activity provides public access to the edge of the sea, and counters vagrancy and mendicancy. Reviving Manila's waterfront through the Baywalk injected vibrance and historic appreciation into the public space with the statues of Arsenio Lacson, Ninoy Aquino and Evelio Javier placed in key areas.

At the onset, lack of funds hampered the revival of the Baywalk. Eventually, planning for the Baywalk means understanding and regulating a diversity of functions with appropriate policy.

=== Legislation ===
Manila Bay and its corresponding resources are considered critical recipients of environmental protection. The 1987 Constitution (Article II, Section 16) gives legal basis for general environmental protection: “the State shall protect and advance the right of the people to a balanced and healthful ecology in accord with the rhythm and harmony of nature.”

Manila Bay Declaration 2001 recognized Manila Bay as a source of food, employment and income for the people as well as the gateway for tourism and recreation.

The Stockholm Convention on Persistent Organic Pollutants was adopted in 2001 and enforced in 2004.

=== Rehabilitation ===
Despite the issues generally associated with developing countries, such as poverty, over-population and food security, there is surprisingly a growing concern for the environmental vitality of Manila Bay. Rehabilitation, which in this case refers to an attempt to improve an aquatic system and prevent further damage to the natural ecosystems, is a responsibility assumed both by government and non-government organizations. The Supreme Court of the Philippines for example had ordered the Metro Manila Development Authority to "demolish illegal structures and dwellings along riverbanks and waterways connected to Manila Bay by 2015" in March 2011 as an attempt to decrease mass occurrences of water pollution. Projects involving the wider communities include the organization of the "Manila Bay Clean Up Run," which essentially supports the Philippine Environment Agencies with their objectives to raise funding and awareness towards the rehabilitation of Manila Bay's natural environments.

On January 27, 2019, the Department of Environment and Natural Resources started a rehabilitation program that is being administered by different government agencies. Because of the rehabilitation, the 10th Philippine International Pyromusical Competition that was scheduled for February 16, 2019, at the SM Mall of Asia bayside area was postponed before being moved to SM City Clark on February 23, 2019.

==== Beach nourishment ====
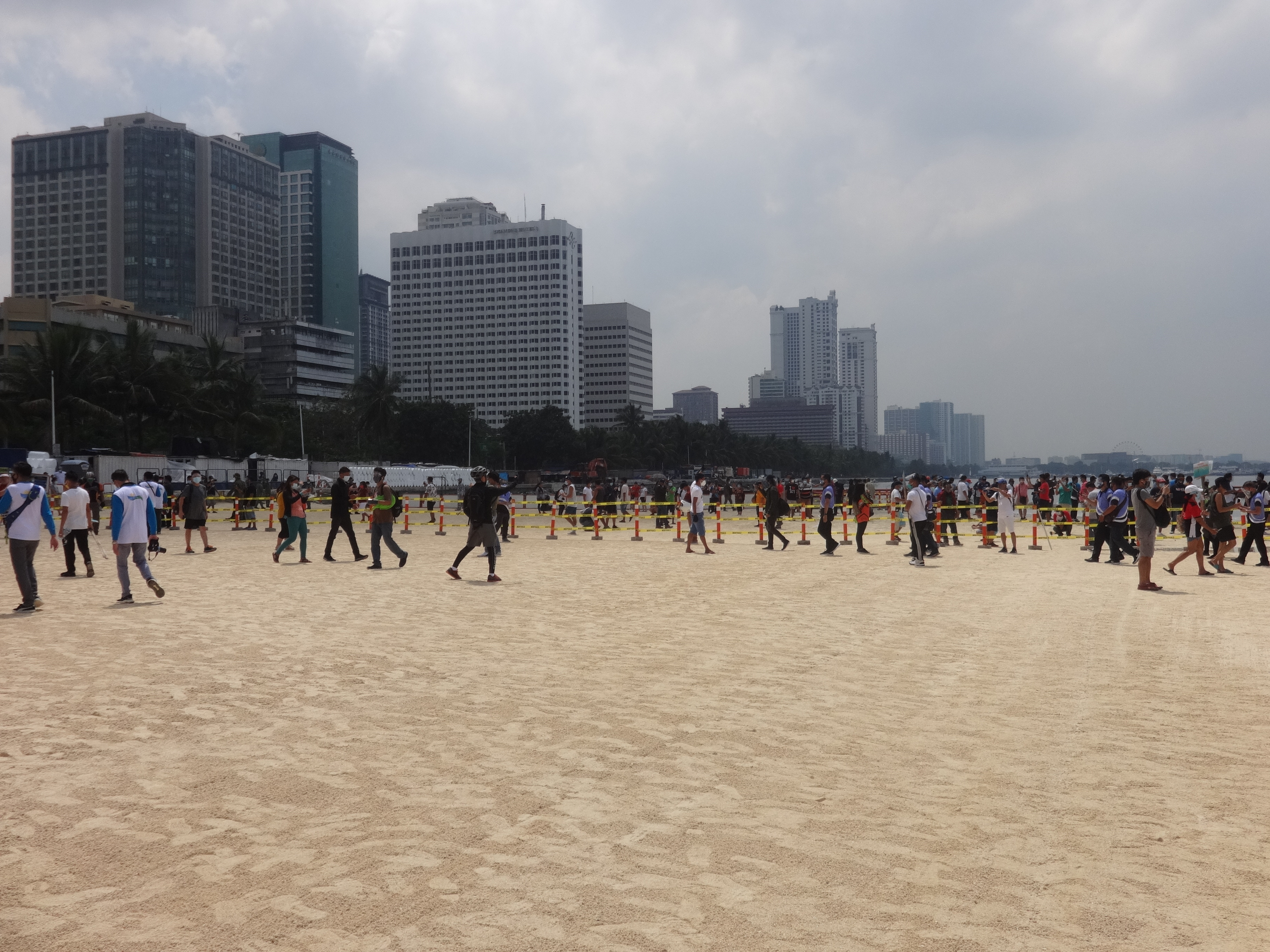
The beach during its temporary opening in September 2020.

In early September 2020, work began on Manila Bay Beach, which was constructed through the process of beach nourishment, which a common practice in the creation of beaches around the world. It is part of an overall integrated coastal zone management aimed at coastal defense of the Manila Bay rehabilitation. When the Manila Bay Beach project came to wider public attention, the project received criticism from environmental and heritage conservationist groups. Among these include the timing of the project which was implemented amidst the COVID-19 pandemic and concerns of adverse environmental effects caused by dumping dolomite on the polluted Manila Bay.

According to the Mines and Geosciences Bureau, the project will benefit tourism, commerce and the environment. It will also protect coastal properties from erosion and storm surges, and beach nourishment is preferred over hard beach stabilizing structures (such as seawalls and groynes). The Department of Health released a statement that the use of dolomite is not a known health hazard.

As with other beach nourishment projects, the area can serve as additional habitat for a number of species such as sea turtles, as well as sea birds and beach flora. When the beach was first opened to the public, a flock of egrets were seen at the beach area.

Water quality significantly improved, especially around the beach area. The DENR reported a significant drop in fecal coliform level in the waters around the beach, from 2.2 million mpn/100ml last January 4, 2021 to 523,000 mpn/100 ml in February 2021, based on the average count from three monitoring stations.

=== Bridges ===
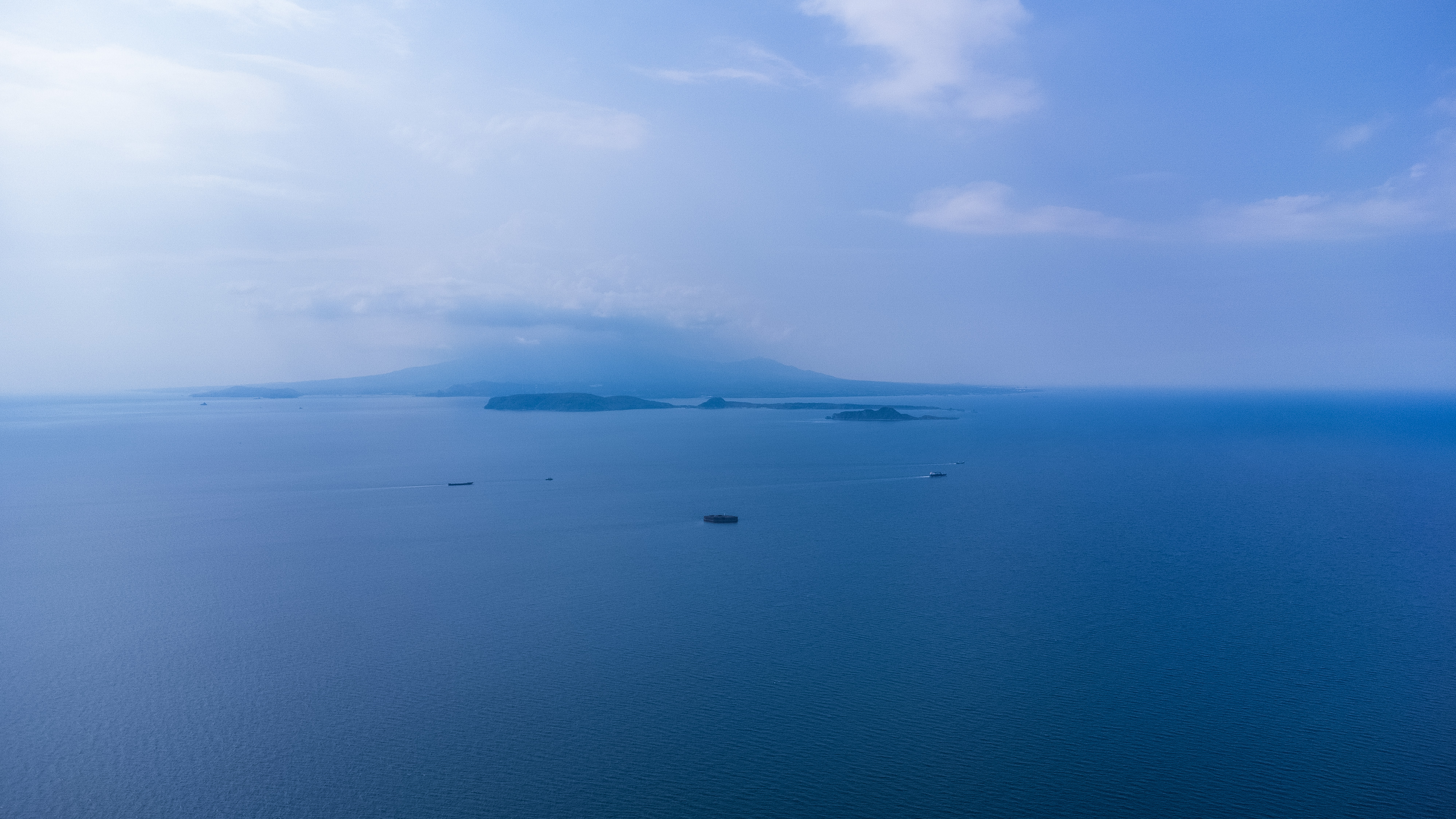
The proposed Bataan-Cavite Interlink Bridge will provide a permanent road link between the provinces of Bataan and Cavite. It will have a U-turn near Corregidor Island for future connection.

Plans of constructing a bridge or bridge-tunnel that crosses Manila Bay have been around since 1987. In January 2020, the National Economic and Development Authority approved the plan to construct the Bataan–Cavite Interlink Bridge, also known as Manila Bay Bridge, which is expected to cross Manila Bay and connect the provinces of Bataan and Cavite. The detailed engineering design and marine geophysical surveys for the bridge are currently being completed before the start of construction.

== Water quality ==
Successive changes in and around Manila Bay are largely due to the intertwining impacts of continued industrialization, unrelenting increases in population, and incessant human activities catering to livelihood and habitation. These factors are directly degrading the overall environment of Manila Bay and these impacts are manifested in the continued deterioration of the water quality within the bay. Several industries operate along the bay in the highly urbanized Metro Manila area, while there are shipyard facilities in Cavite and in Bataan, several more heavy industries, refineries and a power plant are present. At the shipping ports and ferry terminals, an average of 30,000 ships arrive and depart annually to transport passengers, manufactured goods and raw materials. Industrial waste discharges and discharges of untreated domestic wastes from drainage and sewer outlets have contributed to the severe decline in the quality of water and sediments in the bay as well as impacted on the existing marine habitats.

=== Salinity ===
According to a 2011 study by Jacinto et al., Manila Bay has an average surface salinity of 32.6 psu (practical salinity unit). Due to the river influx, the areas near the coasts have low salinity especially in the vicinity of the mouth of the Pasig River in the eastern part of the bay. The bay's salinity is also affected by strong seasonal variations.

=== Effects of soil erosion ===
As indicated by the exposed roots of the coconut trees, continuing soil erosion has been a major factor in the changing shoreline of Manila Bay. Apart from soil erosion, other environmental processes such as siltation and sea level rise have also contributed to changing the bay's coastline. In some parts of the bay, however, erosion is prevented by seawalls and breakers particularly in areas where land has been reclaimed.

=== Pollution ===
With the presence of ports, sea-based sources of pollution around the bay are from ships and motorized boats. Twelve oil spills were recorded in 1995, but it was in 1999 where the highest total volume of oil spill occurred in the Manila South Harbor and Limay, Bataan. Increased presence of oil and grease in the waters are attributed to maritime activities at the harbors, together with the presence of oil terminals and the discharges from industries. These factors directly impact the health of Manila Bay's waters.

Aside from oil spills, trace metals such as copper, cadmium and zinc at the surface of the water were found at the bay coming from sea-based and land-based (e.g., domestic sewage, industrial effluents, runoff, combustion emissions, and mining operations) sources.

In 1996, concentrations of 16 commonly used pesticides in surface sediment was found including dichloro-diphenyl-trichloroethane (DDT). Polycyclic aromatic hydrocarbons (PAH) found in Manila Bay sediments have been influenced by human activities. PAH come principally from petrogenic sources (e.g., oil discharges from ships, refineries and industries) and pyrolytic sources (from combustion sources).

Pesticide residues from rice paddy water draining into irrigation canals, which later on empty into river systems and eventually flowing into the surrounding lakes reaches the waters of Manila Bay. Compounds from these pesticide residues find themselves in food items with metamidophos, endosulfan, chlorpyrifos and diazinon among the common contaminants. While chronic toxic effects on inhabitants of the bay were not found, impairments of marine biota were more evident.

In 1997, polychlorinated biphenyl congeners, compounds common in transformers, hydraulic fluids, paint additives and pesticides were determined in sediments and oysters sampled from Manila Bay. The increase in the nutrient concentration and presence of nitrate, ammonia and phosphate in the bay, from the 1980s, through to the 1990s and beyond are not only attributed to agricultural runoff and river discharges but also to fertilizers from fishponds.

On July 25, 2024, the oil tanker MT Terra Nova, carrying around 1.5 million liters (400,000 U.S. gal) of industrial fuel, capsized in Manila Bay during Typhoon Gaemi, causing an oil spill with a length of 4 kilometers (2.5 mi).

== Future ==
=== Sea level rise ===
Global warming poses a great threat to the conservation of Manila Bay and its bordering cities. With recent studies predicting that the sea level could rise between .75 and 1.9 metres by 2100 and considering the vast landscape of development, growing industries and overly dense population, the exponential assets exposed to flood-prone zones is a dire issue. The Philippine Country Study to Address Climate Change has depicted a proactive approach to this environmental issue through governance of a detailed impact assessment covering the following elements:

Physical Environment

- Tidal regimes including low and high levels of water circulation
- Outlining of seasons to depict periods of high and low rainfall

Habitat and Species

- Identification of coral species, mangrove forests, ecosystems within the coastlines, as well as nearby agricultural land

Vulnerability Analysis

- Vulnerability maps were drawn to outline townscape in accelerated sea level timelines. Using such resources pinpoints the populated areas and natural habitats most likely to be inundated as a result of global warming

In 2010, at the occasion of the first Inter-LGU Forum on Tidal Flooding in Manila, the Dutch ambassador Robert Brinks recommended to close Manila Bay and build dykes in order to protect Manila and the surrounding provinces from the sea level rise that is expected as a result of climate change. However, he also noted that closing Manila Bay by means of a dyke would also require a new harbor location to replace the Port of Manila.

=== Challenges ===
Due to the low profile of environmentalism and its objectives within the nation of the Philippines, official awareness of global warming and the investment to applicable research is in itself triumphant. Further steps to meet the challenge of rehabilitation and sea-level rise within Manila Bay may include additional research to gain insight to the complex nature of existent ecosystems; investment to coastal protection means such as the implementation of concrete walls; laws and policies dedicated to the protection of habitats and restriction or zoning of developments; as well as public educational programs to increase the intensity of conservation support. Long-term goals for Manila Bay would ideally include the decrease or termination of nearby highly polluting enterprises, implementation of effective standards for waste-water discharge and an overall improved water quality.

== Notable events ==
- Battles of La Naval de Manila – a series of five naval battles fought in Manila Bay, Spanish East Indies in 1646, in which the forces of the Spanish Empire repelled various attempts by forces of the Dutch Republic to invade Manila, during the Eighty Years' War.
- Battle of Manila Bay – one of the most decisive naval battles in history and marking the end of the Spanish colonial period in Philippine history, it took place on 1 May 1898, during the Spanish–American War.
- Ruby Rose Barrameda murder case – Ruby Rose Barrameda-Jimenez was the sister of Filipino actress Rochelle Barramedawho went missing in Navotas, Metro Manila on 14 March 2007 while making a family visit. Barrameda-Jimenez's body was found on 10 June 2009, over two years after she disappeared.

== See also ==
- Naval Base Manila
- Battle of Manila Bay
- Bay City
- Geography of the Philippines
- Manila Bay Beach
- Pasig river rehabilitation
