= 2025 Malabon local elections =

Local elections in the Philippines

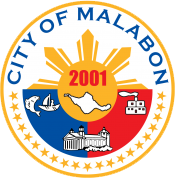
- May 12, 2025
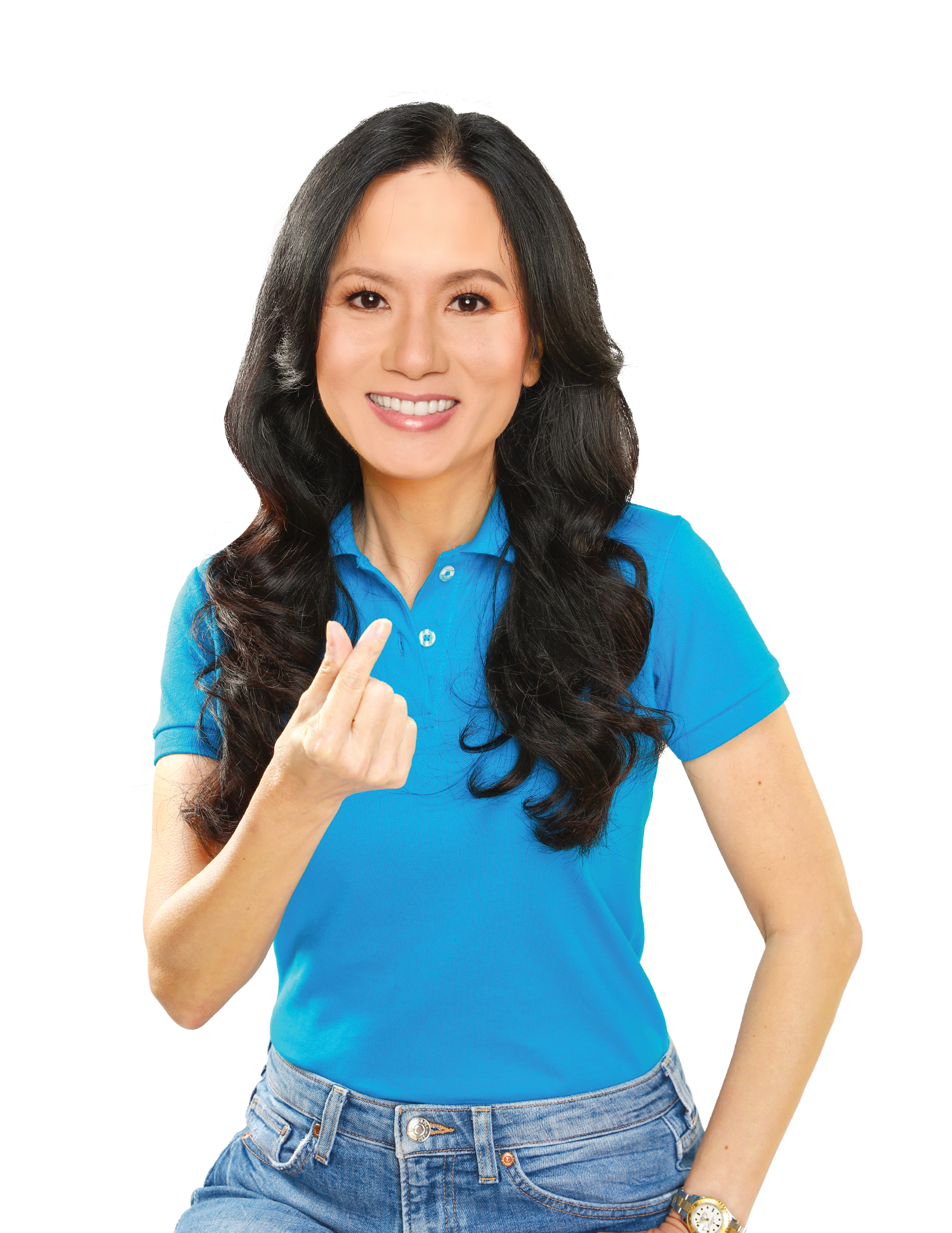

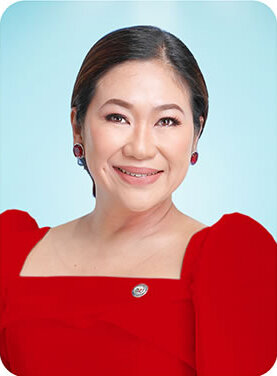
Nominee	Jeannie Sandoval	Josephine Lacson-Noel
Party	Nacionalista	NPC
Running mate	Edward Nolasco (Lakas)	Angelika Dela Cruz
Popular vote	120,757	65,710
Percentage	64.76%	35.24%
Mayor before election
Jeannie Sandoval
Nacionalista
Elected mayor
Jeannie Sandoval
Nacionalista

Local elections were held in Malabon on May 12, 2025, as part of the 2025 Philippine general election. The electorate elected a mayor, a vice mayor, 12 members of the Malabon City Council, and district representative to the House of Representatives of the Philippines. The officials elected in the election will assume their respective offices on June 30, 2025, for a three-year-long term.

== Background ==
Mayor Jeannie Sandoval ran for re-election for her second term. She was challenged by Malabon representative Josephine Lacson-Noel.

Vice Mayor Bernard "Ninong" dela Cruz was eligible to run for supposedly third and final term, but he ran for Malabon representative instead. His party chosen former Acting Vice Mayor and Councilor Diosdado Cunanan to run in his place.

Representative Josephine Lacson-Noel was eligible to run for supposedly third and final term, but she ran for mayor instead. Her runningmate was Barangay Longos Chairwoman Angelika Dela Cruz.

Former Mayor Antolin "Lenlen Oreta III sought political comeback as he ran for congressman. He ran against Rep. Federico "Ricky" Sandoval II, former An Waray Rep. Florencio Gabriel "Bem" Noel, and Vice Mayor Bernard "Ninong" Dela Cruz.

== Tickets ==
=== Administration coalition ===
Team Kakampi Malabon
Position	#	Name	Party
House of Representatives	4.	Ricky Sandoval	Lakas
Mayor	2.	Jeannie Sandoval	Nacionalista
Vice mayor	4.	Edward Nolasco	Lakas
Councilor (1st district)	1.	Gerry Bernardo	PFP
Councilor (1st district)	2.	Ian Emmanuel Borja	Nacionalista
Councilor (1st district)	7.	Payapa Ona	Nacionalista
Councilor (1st district)	8.	Paulo Oreta	PMP
Councilor (1st district)	11.	Maricar Torres	Nacionalista
Councilor (1st district)	12.	Leslie Yambao	UNA
Councilor (2nd district)	3.	Jasper Cruz	Lakas
Councilor (2nd district)	5.	Star Dizon	Nacionalista
Councilor (2nd district)	7.	Al Niño Galauran	PFP
Councilor (2nd district)	11.	Monay Mañalac	PFP
Councilor (2nd district)	15.	Nadja Marie Vicencio	PMP
Councilor (2nd district)	16.	Len Yanga	PFP

=== Primary opposition coalition ===
Team Serbisyong Buong Puso
Position	#	Name	Party
House of Representatives	2.	Bem Noel	NPC
Mayor	1.	Jaye Lacson-Noel	NPC
Vice mayor	2.	Angelika dela Cruz	NPC
Councilor (1st district)	3.	Al Caste Castillo	NPC
Councilor (1st district)	4.	Edwin Lacson Dimagiba	NPC
Councilor (1st district)	6.	Niño Lacson Noel	NPC
Councilor (1st district)	10.	Concon San Juan	NPC
Councilor (2nd district)	6.	Erika Dusaran	NPC
Councilor (2nd district)	8.	Sonia Lim	NPC
Councilor (2nd district)	9.	Moy2Palaboy Macasero	PDP
Councilor (2nd district)	10.	Alvin Mañalac	NPC
Councilor (2nd district)	12.	Ading Manzon	NPC
Councilor (2nd district)	14.	Mark Roque	NPC

=== Other coalitions ===
Team Pogi
Position	#	Name	Party
House of Representatives	3.	Lenlen Oreta	NUP
Vice mayor	3.	Jap Garcia	NUP
Councilor (1st district)	9.	Joey Sabaricos	Liberal
Councilor (2nd district)	13.	Enzo Oreta	NUP

Team Mahal Cong Malabon
Position	#	Name	Party
House of Representatives	1.	Ninong dela Cruz	PDP
Vice mayor	1.	Dado Cunanan	PDP
Councilor (2nd district)	4.	Rom Cunanan	PDP

=== Independent candidates ===
Independent
Position	#	Name	Party
Councilor (1st district)	5.	Tok Hio (withdrew)	Independent
Councilor (2nd district)	1.	Archie Jade Añora	Independent
Councilor (2nd district)	2.	Paul Cabrera	Independent

== Results ==
=== For Mayor ===
Re-electionist Mayor Jeannie Sandoval defeated Representative Jaye Lacson-Noel.

Malabon Mayoral Election
Party	Candidate	Votes	%
Nacionalista	Jeannie Sandoval	120,757	64.76
NPC	Jaye Lacson-Noel	65,710	35.24
Total votes		186,467	100.00
Nacionalista hold			

=== For Vice Mayor ===
Councilor Edward Nolasco won over Brgy. Longos Chairwoman Angelika Dela Cruz, and fellow councilors John Anthony "Jap" Garcia and Diosdado "Dado" Cunanan.

Malabon Vice Mayoral Elections
Party	Candidate	Votes	%
Lakas	Edward Nolasco	73,302	40.05
NPC	Angelika Dela Cruz	54,658	29.86
NUP	John Anthony "Jap" Garcia	39,146	21.39
PDP	Diosdado "Dado" Cunanan	15,912	8.69
Total votes		183,018	100.00
Lakas gain from PDP			

=== For Representative ===
Former Mayor Antolin "Lenlen" Oreta III won over former Rep. Federico "Ricky" Sandoval II, former An Waray Rep. Florencio Gabriel "Bem" Noel, and Vice Mayor Bernard "Ninong" Dela Cruz.

Congressional Elections for Malabon's Lone District
Party	Candidate	Votes	%
NUP	Antolin "Lenlen" Oreta III	84,940	45.71
Lakas	Federico "Ricky" Sandoval II	67,824	36.50
NPC	Florencio Gabriel "Bem" Noel	20,578	11.07
PDP–Laban	Bernard "Ninong" Dela Cruz	12,480	6.72
Total votes		186,002	100.00
NUP gain from NPC			

=== For Councilors ===
The Malabon City Council is composed of 14 councilors, 12 of whom are elected.

==== First District ====
Malabon's 1st councilor district consists of the barangays of Baritan, Bayan-bayanan, Catmon, Concepcion, Dampalit, Flores, Hulong Duhat, Ibaba, Maysilo, Muzon, Niugan, Panghulo, San Agustin, Santulan and Tañong. Six councilors are elected from this councilor district.

On May 8, 2025, Edwin Hio announced the withdrawal of his Malabon's 1st councilor district candidacy.

City Council Elections for Malabon's First District
Party	Candidate	Votes	%
Nacionalista	Maricar Torres	55,525	53.60
Nacionalista	Ian Emmanuel Borja	51,989	50.19
UNA	Ma. Anna Lizza "Leslie" Yambao	50,207	48.47
PMP	Paulo Oreta	48,579	46.90
PFP	Genaro "Gerry" Bernardo	45,994	44.40
Nacionalista	Payapa Ona	43,734	42.22
NPC	Regino Lacson "Niño" Noel	43,148	41.65
NPC	Edwin Dimagiba	35,018	33.80
Liberal	Joey Sabaricos	28,221	27.24
NPC	Concon San Juan	25,059	24.19
NPC	Al Caste Castillo	23,006	22.21
Independent	Edwin "Tok" Hio (withdrew)	14,613	14.11
Total votes		465,093	100.00

==== Second District ====
Malabon's 2nd councilor district consists of the barangays of Acacia, Longos, Potrero, Tinajeros, Tonsuya and Tugatog. Six councilors are elected from this councilor district.

City Council Elections for Malabon's Second District
Party	Candidate	Votes	%
NUP	Jose Lorenzo "Enzo" Oreta	47,830	52.82
PMP	Nadja Marie Vicencio	44,649	49.30
Lakas	Jasper Kevin Cruz	42,990	47.07
PFP	Edralin "Len" Yanga	37,781	41.72
NPC	Sonia Lim	32,769	36.19
PDP–Laban	Romualdo "Rom" Cunanan	31,942	35.27
NPC	Mark Roque	27,322	30.17
PFP	Monay Mañalac	25,592	28.26
NPC	Alvin Mañalac	22,342	24.67
PFP	Al Niño Galauran	21,724	23.99
NPC	Erika Dusaran	18,539	20.47
Nacionalista	Star Dizon	17,351	19.16
PDP–Laban	James Ronald Macasero	12,495	13.80
Independent	Archie Jade Añora	12,492	13.79
NPC	Ading Manzon	12,297	13.58
Independent	Paul Cabrera Jr.	8,921	9.85
Total votes		384,267	100.00
