= 2022 Malabon local elections =

Philippine election

2022 Malabon mayoral elections
- May 9, 2022
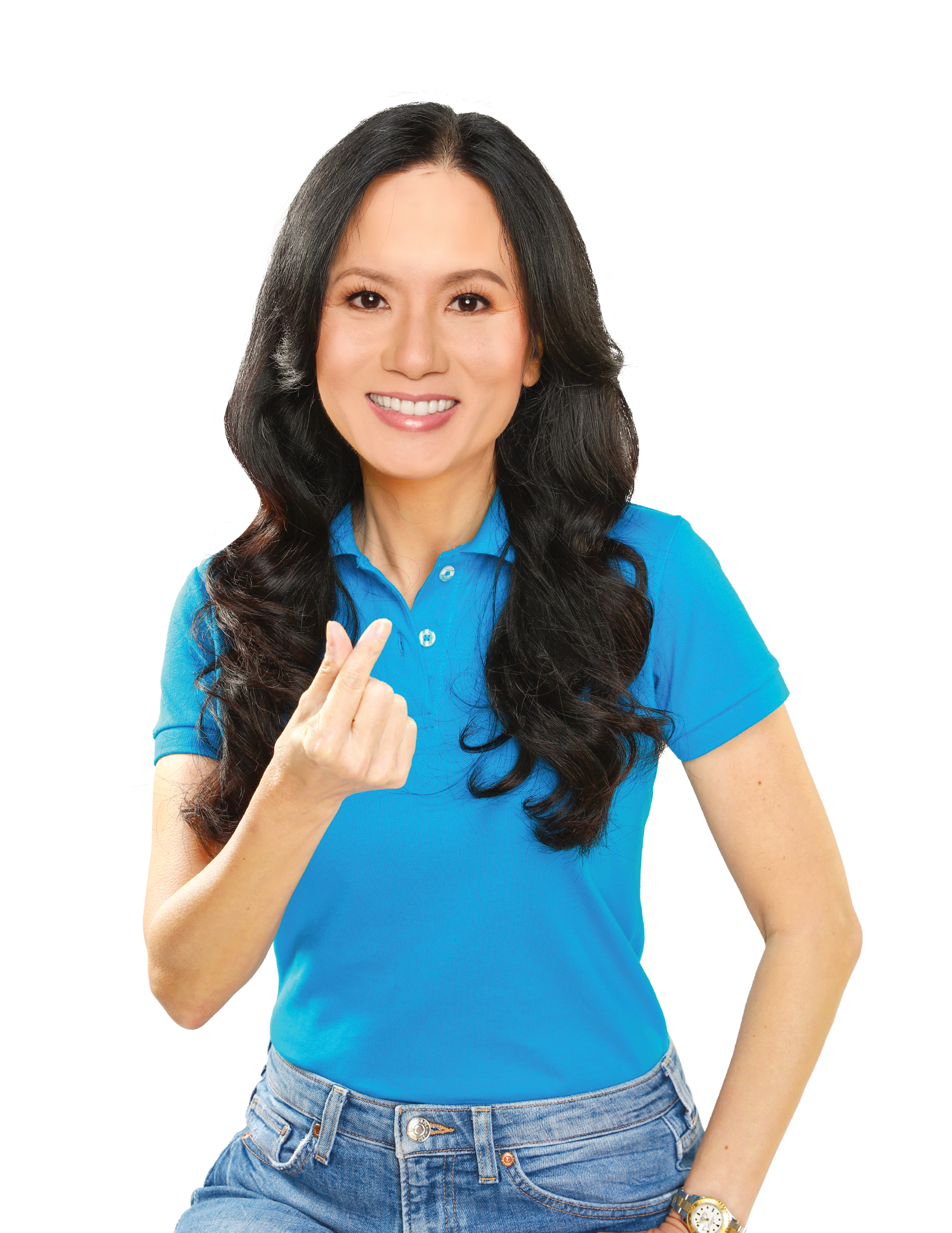
Nominee	Jeannie Sandoval	Jose Lorenzo "Enzo" Oreta
Party	Nacionalista	NUP
Running mate	Mark Allan Jay "Jayjay" Yambao (PFP)	Bernard "Ninong" Dela Cruz
Popular vote	94,826	93,547
Percentage	50.34%	49.66%
Mayor before election
Antolin Oreta III
Liberal
Elected mayor
Jeannie Sandoval
Nacionalista

Local elections was held in Malabon on May 9, 2022, within the Philippine general election. The voters will elect for the elective local posts in the city: the mayor, vice mayor, the two Congressmen, and the twelve councilors for the city's two Sangguniang Panglungsod districts, six for each district.

== Background ==
Mayor Antolin "Lenlen" Oreta III was term-limited. His party has no candidate for mayor, but Oreta supported the candidacy of his brother, Councilor Jose Lorenzo "Enzo" Oreta. Oreta was challenged by former Vice Mayor Jeannie Sandoval.

Vice Mayor Bernard "Ninong" Dela Cruz ran for re-election for his second term. He was challenged by former Vice Mayor Mark Allan Jay "Jayjay" Yambao, sister of incumbent Councilor Maria Anna Lizza "Leslie" Yambao.

Rep. Josephine Veronique "Jaye" Lacson-Noel ran for second term. She was challenged by former Rep. Ricky Sandoval for the second time. Lacson-Noel defeated Sandoval in 2019.

== Candidates ==
=== Administration coalition ===
Team Pamilyang Malabonian
#	Name	Party
For House Of Representatives
1.	Josephine Lacson-Noel	NPC
For Mayor
1.	Enzo Oreta	NUP
For Vice Mayor
1.	Bernard Dela Cruz	NUP
For Councilor (1st District)
1.	Gerry Bernardo	NUP
3.	Jimmy Dumalaog	Liberal
4.	Jap Garcia	Aksyon
6.	Niño Noel	NPC
8.	Paulo Oreta	NPC
9.	Joey Sabaricos	Aksyon
For Councilor (2nd District)
2.	Ambet Bautista	NPC
3.	Jasper Cruz	Aksyon
4.	Dado Cunanan	NUP
6.	Jonbalot Lim	NPC
7.	Peng Mañalac	Liberal
10.	Len Yanga	Liberal

=== Primary opposition coalition ===
Team Kakampi Malabon
#	Name	Party
For House Of Representatives
2.	Ricky Sandoval	PDP–Laban
For Mayor
2.	Jeannie Sandoval	Nacionalista
For Vice Mayor
2.	Jayjay Yambao	PFP
For Councilor (1st District)
7.	Payapa Ona	Nacionalista
10.	Maricar Torres	Nacionalista
11.	Leslie Yambao	UNA
For Councilor (2nd District)
8.	Edward Nolasco	Nacionalista
9.	Nadja Marie Vicencio	Nacionalista

=== Independents ===
Independent
#	Name	Party
For Councilor (1st District)
2.	Jon Cruz	Independent
5.	Joseph Legaspi	Independent
For Councilor (2nd District)
1.	Robert Ballentos	Independent
5.	Niña Fatima Jimenez	Independent

== Results ==
=== For Mayor ===
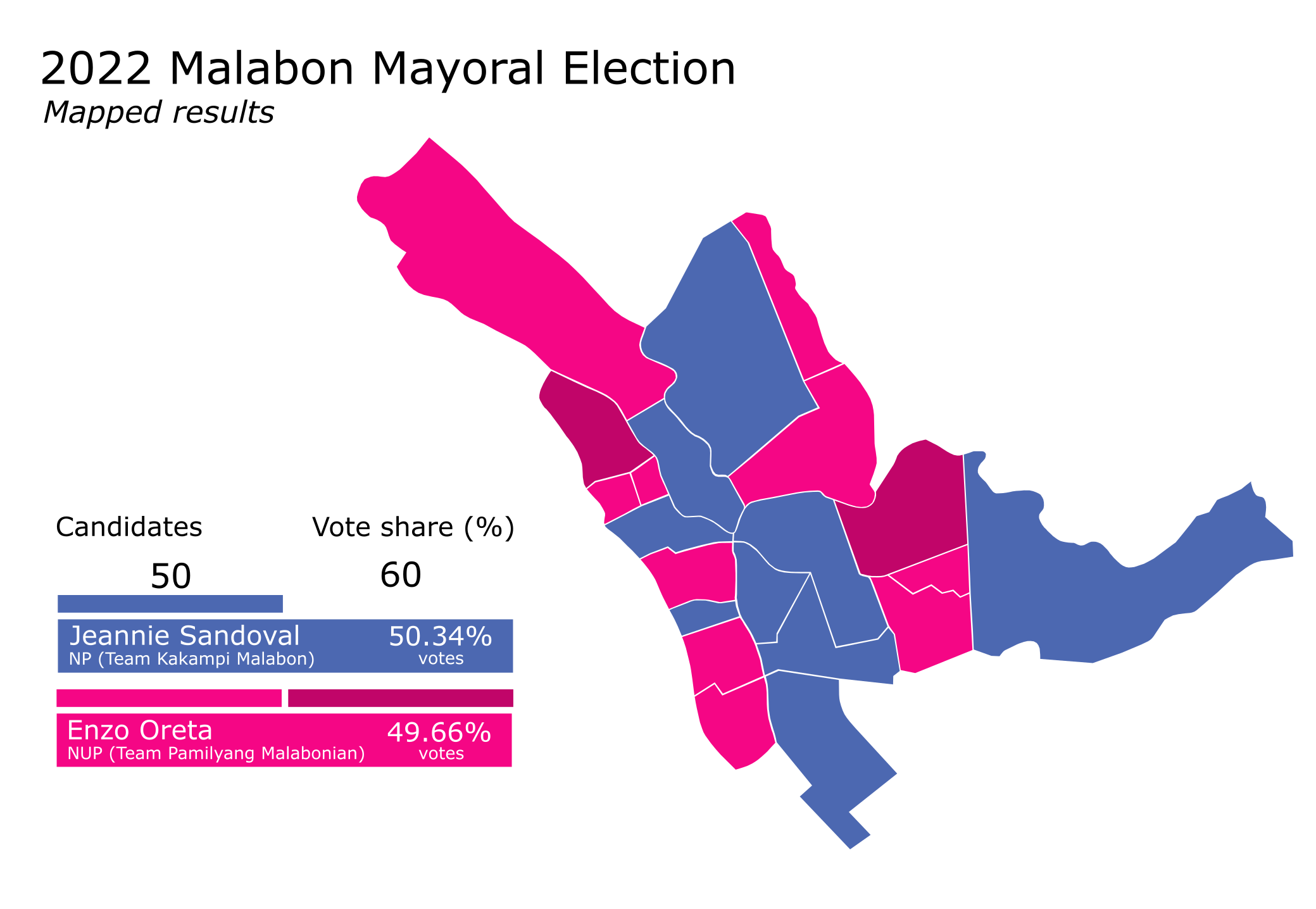
Results per barangay according to ER returns

Councilor Jose Lorenzo "Enzo" Oreta was defeated by former Vice Mayor Jeannie Sandoval by a thin margin.

Malabon Mayoral Election
Party	Candidate	Votes	%
Nacionalista	Jeannie Sandoval	94,826	50.34%
NUP	Jose Lorenzo "Enzo" Oreta	93,547	49.66%
Total votes		188,373	100.00
Nacionalista hold			

=== For Vice Mayor ===
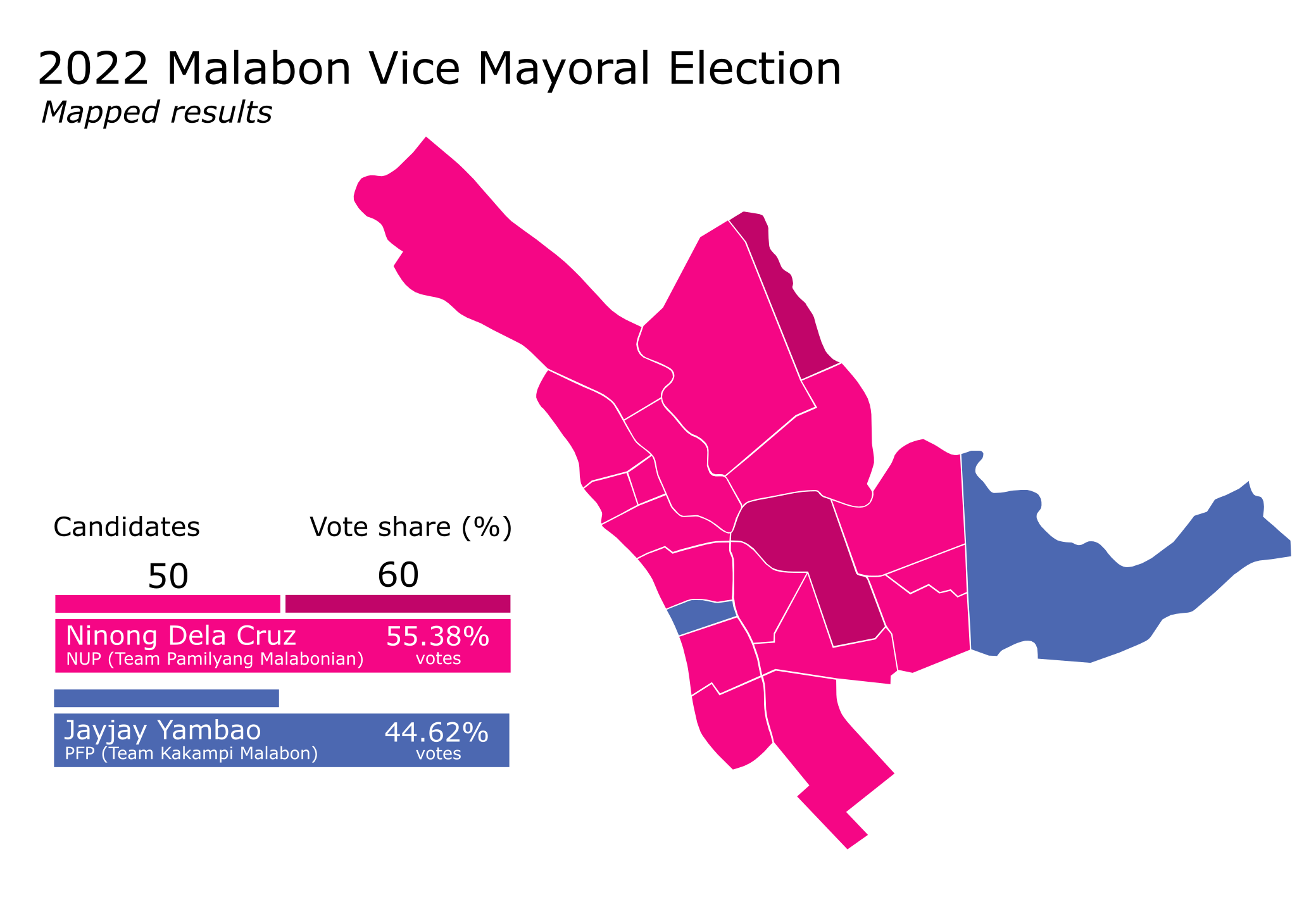
Results per barangay according to ER returns

Vice Mayor Bernard "Ninong" Dela Cruz won his second term against former Vice Mayor Mark Allan Jay "Jayjay" Yambao, brother of incumbent Councilor Maria Anna Lizza "Leslie" Yambao.

Malabon Vice Mayoral Election
Party	Candidate	Votes	%
NUP	Bernard "Ninong" Dela Cruz	98,060	55.38%
PFP	Mark Allan Jay "Jayjay" Yambao	79,019	44.62%
Total votes		177,079	100.00
NUP hold			

=== For District Representative ===
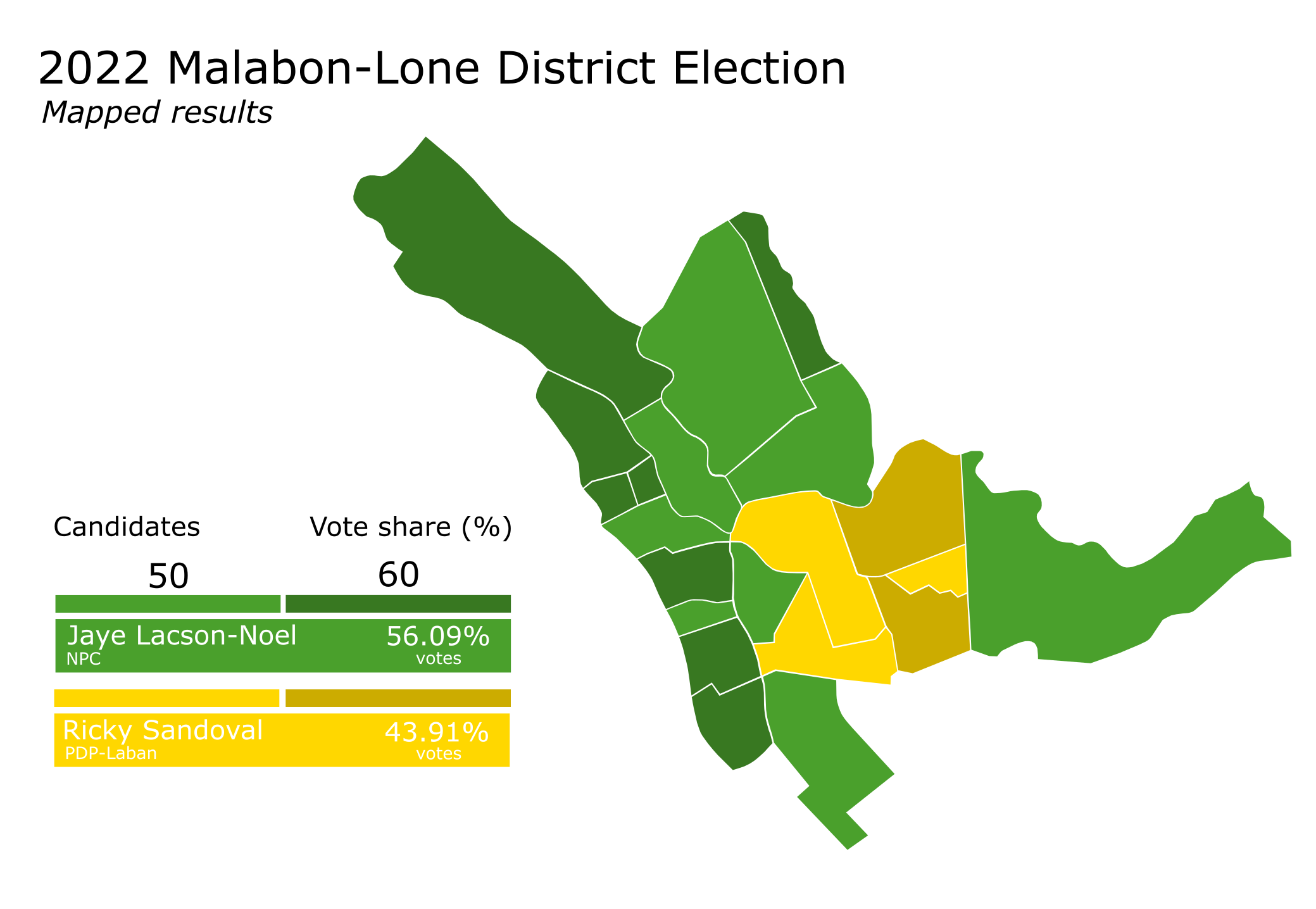
Results per barangay according to ER returns

Incumbent Representative Josephine Veronique "Jaye" Lacson-Noel also won a second term in her rematch with former Rep. Ricky Sandoval from 2019.

Congressional Elections for Malabon's Lone District
Party	Candidate	Votes	%
NPC	Josephine Veronique "Jaye" Lacson-Noel	102,320	56.09%
PDP–Laban	Ricky Sandoval	80,089	43.91%
Total votes		182,409	100.00
NPC hold			

=== For Councilor ===
Party or alliance		Votes	%	Seats
Team Pamilyang Malabonian	Nationalist People's Coalition	181,435	20.53	2
Team Pamilyang Malabonian	Aksyon Demokratiko	146,848	16.62	2
Team Pamilyang Malabonian	Liberal Party	139,289	15.76	2
Team Pamilyang Malabonian	National Unity Party	103,030	11.66	2
Team Pamilyang Malabonian	Total	570,602	64.56	8
Team Kakampi Malabon	Nacionalista Party	193,821	21.93	3
Team Kakampi Malabon	United Nationalist Alliance	43,334	4.90	1
Team Kakampi Malabon	Total	237,155	26.83	4
Independent		76,011	8.60	0
Ex officio seats				2
Total		883,768	100.00	14

==== First District ====
City Council Elections for Malabon's First District
Party	Candidate	Votes	%
NPC	Regino Federico "Niño" Noel	58,348	29.74
Aksyon	John Anthony "Jap" Garcia	58,032	29.58
Nacionalista	Maricar Torres	51,976	26.49
NPC	Paulo Oreta	45,452	23.16
NUP	Genaro "Gerry" Bernardo	44,881	22.87
UNA	Ma. Anna Lizza "Leslie" Yambao	43,334	22.08
Liberal	Jaime "Jimmy" Dumalaog	42,025	21.42
Independent	Virgilio "Jon" Cruz Jr.	39,732	20.25
Nacionalista	Payapa Ona	39,562	20.16
Aksyon	Joey Sabaricos	35,092	17.88
Independent	Joseph Legaspi	15,278	7.79
Total votes		473,712	100.00

Party or alliance		Votes	%	Seats
Team Pamilyang Malabonian	Nationalist People's Coalition	103,800	21.91	2
Team Pamilyang Malabonian	Aksyon Demokratiko	93,124	19.66	1
Team Pamilyang Malabonian	National Unity Party	44,881	9.47	1
Team Pamilyang Malabonian	Liberal Party	42,025	8.87	0
Team Pamilyang Malabonian	Total	283,830	59.92	4
Team Kakampi Malabon	Nacionalista Party	91,538	19.32	1
Team Kakampi Malabon	United Nationalist Alliance	43,334	9.15	1
Team Kakampi Malabon	Total	134,872	28.47	2
Independent		55,010	11.61	0
Total		473,712	100.00	6

==== Second District ====
City Council Elections for Malabon's Second District
Party	Candidate	Votes	%
NUP	Diosdado "Dado" Cunanan	58,149	29.63
Nacionalista	Edward Nolasco	56,022	28.55
Aksyon	Jasper Kevin Cruz	53,724	27.38
Liberal	Edralin "Len" Yanga	49,285	25.12
Liberal	Prospero Alfonso "Peng" Mañalac	47,979	24.45
Nacionalista	Nadja Marie Vicencio	46,261	23.58
NPC	Robert "Ambet" Bautista	45,077	22.97
NPC	Fernando "Jonbalot" Lim Jr.	32,558	16.59
Independent	Nina Fatima Jimenez	12,003	6.12
Independent	Robert Aurel Ballentos	8,998	4.59
Total votes		410,056	100.00

Party or alliance		Votes	%	Seats
Team Pamilyang Malabonian	Liberal Party	97,264	23.72	2
Team Pamilyang Malabonian	Nationalist People's Coalition	77,635	18.93	0
Team Pamilyang Malabonian	National Unity Party	58,149	14.18	1
Team Pamilyang Malabonian	Aksyon Demokratiko	53,724	13.10	1
Team Pamilyang Malabonian	Total	286,772	69.93	4
Nacionalista Party		102,283	24.94	2
Independent		21,001	5.12	0
Total		410,056	100.00	6
