= 2016 Malabon local elections =

Philippine election

2016 Malabon mayoral election
- May 9, 2016
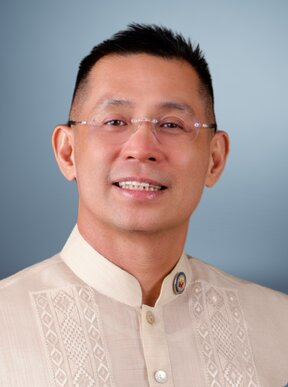

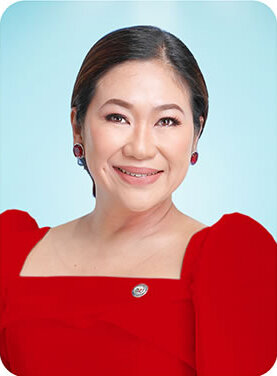
Nominee	Antolin Oreta III	Josephine Lacson-Noel
Party	Liberal	NPC
Running mate	John Anthony Garcia	Jeannie Sandoval (Nacionalista)
Popular vote	78,899	66,078
Percentage	54.42	45.58
Mayor before election
Antolin Oreta III
Liberal
Elected mayor
Antolin Oreta III
Liberal

Philippine House of Representatives election at Malabon
- May 9, 2016
Nominee	Ricky Sandoval	Tessie Aquino-Oreta	Robin Simon
Party	NPC	Liberal	Independent
Popular vote	69,887	68,108	1,886
Percentage	49.96	48.69	1.35
Congressman before election
Josephine Lacson-Noel
NPC
Elected Congressman
Ricky Sandoval
NPC

Local elections were held in Malabon on May 9, 2016, within the Philippine general election. The voters elected for the elective local posts in the city: the mayor, vice mayor, the two Congressmen, and the twelve councilors for the city's two Sangguniang Panglungsod districts, six for each district.

== Background ==
Mayor Antolin Oreta III ran for re-election. He faced Rep. Josephine Lacson-Noel.

Vice Mayor Jeannie Sandoval ran for re-election. She was challenged by councilors John Anthony "Jap" Garcia and Ma. Anna Lizza "Leslie" Yambao.

Rep. Josephine Lacson-Noel was eligible to run for supposedly third and final term, but she ran for mayor instead. Her party chosen former Representative Ricky Sandoval, who happened to be her opponent last elections. Sandoval was challenged by former Senator Tessie Aquino-Oreta, mother of re-electionist Mayor Antolin Oreta III.

Re-electionist Councilor Merlin "Tiger" Mañalac, son of former Malabon chief of police and councilor Alfonso "Boyong" Mañalac, was shot dead by riding in tandem, near his home in Brgy. Tinajeros, Malabon on January 23, 2016. His eldest son, Tinajeros SK Chairman Prospero Alfonso "Peng" Mañalac was named later as a substitute candidate for him.

== Results ==
Incumbent officials are expressed in italics.

=== For Mayor ===
Incumbent Mayor Antolin "Lenlen" Oreta III defeated Rep. Josephine Veronique "Jaye" Lacson-Noel.

2016 Malabon mayoral election
Party	Candidate	Votes	%
Liberal	Antolin Oreta III (incumbent)	78,899	54.42
NPC	Josephine Lacson-Noel	66,078	45.58
Total votes		144,977	100.00

=== For Vice Mayor ===
Vice Mayor Jeannie Sandoval won over councilors John Anthony "Jap" Garcia and Ma. Anna Lizza "Leslie" Yambao.

2016 Malabon vice mayoral election
Party	Candidate	Votes	%
Nacionalista	Jeannie Sandoval (incumbent)	75,820	53.68
Liberal	Jap Garcia	54,948	38.90
UNA	Leslie Yambao	10,482	7.42
Total votes		141,250	100.00

=== For Representative, Lone District ===
Incumbent Representative Josephine Veronique "Jaye" Lacson-Noel is on her second term. however, she will instead run for mayor. Former Malabon-Navotas District Representative Federico "Ricky" Sandoval II is her party's nominee. Sandoval will face former Senator and Representative Teresa "Tessie" Aquino-Oreta, mother of Mayor Antolin Oreta III.

2016 Malabon's Lone District Congressional Elections
Party	Candidate	Votes	%
NPC	Ricky Sandoval	69,887	49.96
Liberal	Tessie Aquino-Oreta	68,108	48.69
Independent	Robin Simon	1,886	1.35
Total votes		139,881	100.00

=== For Councilors ===
==== Team Pusong Malabonian ====
Liberal Party/Team Pusong Malabonian 1st District
Name	Party
Ricky Bernardo	Liberal
Mario Cruz	PMP
Ninong Dela Cruz	Liberal
Jimmy Dumalaog	Liberal
Donna Nuñez	Liberal
Alex Roque	PMP

Liberal Party/Team Pusong Malabonian 2nd District
Name	Party
Dado Cunanan	Liberal
Sonia Lim	Liberal
Peng Mañalac	Liberal
Enzo Oreta	PMP
Jet Trias	Liberal
Len Yanga	Liberal

==== Team Sanib Lakas ====
Nationalist People's Coalition/Nacionalista Party/Team Sanib Lakas 1st District
Name	Party
Gary Bernardo	NPC
Jon Cruz	NPC
Orence Cruz	NPC
Edwin Dimagiba	NPC
Payapa Ona	Nacionalista
Maricar Torres	Nacionalista

Nationalist People's Coalition/Team Sanib Lakas 2nd District
Name	Party
Rufino Bautista	NPC
Egay Marcial	NPC
Edward Nolasco	NPC
Mark Roque	NPC
Nadja Marie Vicencio	PMP

==== First District ====
City Council Elections for Malabon's First District
Party	Candidate	Votes	%
Liberal	Bernard "Ninong" Dela Cruz^{PM}	42,829	11.10
Liberal	Ricky Bernardo^{PM}	42,381	10.98
Liberal	Jaime "Jimmy" Dumalaog^{PM}	41,969	10.88
Nacionalista	Maricar Torres^{SL}	39,023	10.11
Nacionalista	Payapa Ona^{SL}	28,662	7.43
NPC	Edwin Lacson Dimagiba^{SL}	28,744	7.45
PMP	Alex Roque^{PM}	28,360	7.35
Liberal	Donna Nuñez^{PM}	26,314	6.82
NPC	Virgilio "Jon" Cruz Jr.^{SL}	20,444	5.30
PMP	Mario Cruz^{PM}	24,353	6.31
NPC	Gary Bernardo^{SL}	16,035	4.15
NPC	Orence Cruz^{SL}	14,636	3.79
Independent	RJ Yambao	12,201	3.16
Independent	Reginal Jose	9,181	2.38
NPC	Abbi Balatbat	7,099	1.84
Nacionalista	Ferdie Tanchanco	3,410	0.88
Total votes		80,785	100.00

==== Second District ====
City Council Elections for Malabon's Second District
Party	Candidate	Votes	%
Liberal	Diosdado "Dado" Cunanan^{PM}	43,133	12.39
NPC	Edward Nolasco^{SL}	39,059	11.22
Liberal	Edralin "Len" Yanga^{PM}	39,036	11.21
PMP	Jose Lorenzo "Enzo" Oreta^{PM}	35,785	10.28
Liberal	Prospero Alfonso "Peng" Mañalac^{PM}	35,765	10.27
Liberal	Sofronia "Sonia" Lim^{PM}	35,162	10.10
PMP	Nadja Marie Vicencio^{SL}	32,561	9.35
Liberal	Jet Trias^{PM}	22,518	6.47
NPC	Mark Roque^{SL}	21,544	6.19
NPC	Rufino "Rufing" Bautista^{SL}	21,181	6.08
NPC	Edgardo "Egay" Marcial^{SL}	17,245	4.95
Independent	Sonny Rodriguez	4,980	1.43
Total votes		72,735	100.00

== Notes ==
- ^{SL} Part of the primary opposition coalition named Team Sanib Lakas.
- ^{PM} Part of the administration coalition named Team Pusong Malabonian.
