= 2013 Malabon local elections =

Philippine election

2013 Malabon mayoral election
- May 13, 2013
Nominee	Antolin Oreta III	N/A
Party	Liberal	UNA
Running mate	Diosdado "Dado" Cunanan	Jeannie Sandoval
Popular vote	69,555
Percentage	100.00
Mayor before election
Antolin Oreta III
Liberal
Elected mayor
Antolin Oreta III
Liberal

Local elections were held in Malabon on May 13, 2013 as part of the Philippine general election. Several local posts in the city were on the ballot, including the mayor, vice mayor, one representative, and the twelve councilors for the city's two Sangguniang Panglungsod districts (six for each district).

== Background ==
Acting Mayor and former Vice Mayor Antolin Oreta III sought first full term as Mayor. Oreta became Mayor in 2012 when his uncle, then Mayor Canuto Oreta died. He ran unopposed.

Acting Vice Mayor and former Second District Councilor Diosdado "Dado" Cunanan ran for re-election, sought for first full term as vice mayor. He ran against his fellow councilors Edwin Dimaguiba, Eduardo "Eddie" Nolasco, and ABC Pres. Paulo Oreta, son of the late Mayor Canuto Oreta, and also to Jeannie Sandoval, wife of former Representative Ricky Sandoval.

Incumbent Representative Josephine Lacson-Noel sought for her second term unopposed.

== Results ==
=== Mayor ===
Acting Mayor and former Vice Mayor Antolin Oreta III sought first full term as Mayor. Oreta became Mayor in 2012 when his uncle, then Mayor Canuto Oreta died. He ran unopposed.

Malabon Mayoral Election
Party	Candidate	Votes	%
Liberal	Antolin Oreta III (incumbent)	69,555	100.00
Total votes		69,555	100.00
Liberal hold			

=== Vice Mayor ===
Jeannie Sandoval, wife of former Rep. Ricky Sandoval won over her closest opponent Councilor Edwin Dimaguiba. She defeated her other rivals including Acting Vice Mayor Diosdado "Dado" Cunanan, ABC President Paulo Oreta and Councilor Eduardo "Eddie" Nolasco.

Malabon Vice Mayoral Election
Party	Candidate	Votes	%
UNA	Jeannie Sandoval	38,592	31.13
NPC	Edwin Dimaguiba	38,017	30.66
Liberal	Diosdado "Dado" Cunanan (incumbent)	27,282	22.00
Independent	Paulo Oreta	18,081	14.58
Independent	Eduardo "Eddie" Nolasco	2,009	1.62
Total votes		123,981	100.00
UNA gain from Liberal			

=== Representative, Lone District of Malabon ===
Incumbent Representative Jaye Lacson-Noel sought for her second term unopposed.

Representative, Lone District of Malabon
Party	Candidate	Votes	%
NPC	Jaye Lacson-Noel (incumbent)	81,634	100.00
Total votes		81,634	100.00
NPC hold			

=== Councilor ===
==== First District ====
Member, Sangguniang Panlungsod in Malabon's First District
Party	Candidate	Votes	%
Liberal	Maricar Torres	40,776	
Liberal	John Anthony "Jap" Garcia	36,998	
Liberal	Ma. Anna Lizza "Leslie" Yambao	35,672	
Independent	Bernard "Ninong" Dela Cruz	32,253	
Liberal	Jaime "Jimmy" Dumalaog	31,283	
Liberal	Ricky Bernardo	31,156	
Liberal	Payapa Ona	31,028	
PDP–Laban	Jon Cruz	22,115	
Independent	Abbi Balatbat	19,549	
Independent	Joey Sabaricos	13,231	
PDP–Laban	Merlyn Balite	6,232	
Independent	Severino Jocson	5,506	
Independent	Andres Parentela	4,695	
Total votes			

==== Second District ====
Member, Sangguniang Panlungsod in Malabon's Second District
Party	Candidate	Votes	%
UNA	Nadja Marie Vicencio	40,753	
Liberal	Edward Nolasco	36,614	
NPC	Edralin "Len" Yanga	32,308	
Liberal	Merlin "Tiger" Mañalac	29,273	
Nacionalista	Sofronia "Sonia" Lim	27,945	
Liberal	Rufino Bautista	27,359	
Independent	Ryan Cunanan	25,469	
Liberal	Cecil Espiritu	24,335	
Independent	Edgardo Marcial	17,779	
NPC	Indon Cruz	17,573	
Independent	Mario Rances	3,099	
Independent	Junar De Leon	2,371	
Total votes			
