= 2019 Malabon local elections =

Philippine election

2019 Malabon mayoral election
- May 13, 2019
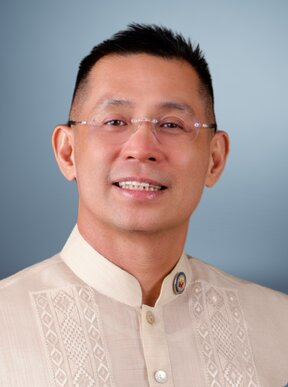

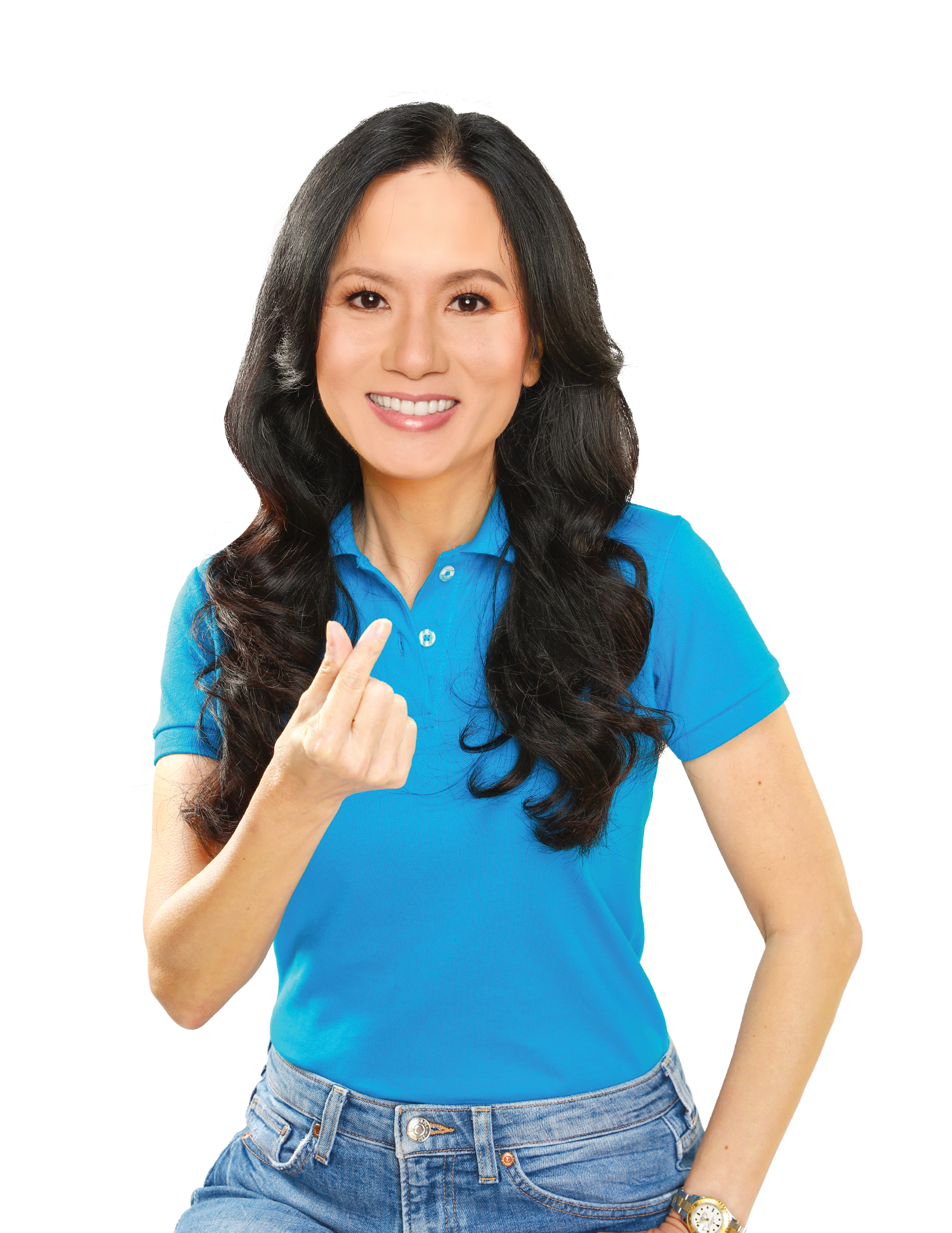
Nominee	Antolin Oreta III	Jeannie Sandoval
Party	Liberal	Nacionalista
Running mate	Ninong Dela Cruz (NUP)	Maricar Torres
Popular vote	100,975	56,156
Percentage	64.22%	35.78%
Mayor before election
Antolin Oreta III
Liberal
Elected mayor
Antolin Oreta III
Liberal

Local elections were held in Malabon on May 13, 2019 as part of the Philippine general election. Several local posts in the city were on the ballot, including the mayor, vice mayor, the two Congressmen, and the twelve councilors for the city's two Sangguniang Panglungsod districts (six for each district).

== Background ==
Mayor Antolin Oreta III ran for re-election for his third and final term. He was challenged by Vice Mayor Jeannie Sandoval.

Vice Mayor Jeannie Sandoval was on her second term. Although eligible to run for third consecutive term, she ran as mayor instead. Her party chosen Councilor Maricar Torres. Torres was challenged by her fellow councilor Bernard "Ninong" Dela Cruz, Oreta's running mate.

Representative Ricky Sandoval, husband of mayoral candidate Jeannie Ng-Sandoval ran for re-election. He faced former Representative Josephine Lacson-Noel, who lost to Oreta last election, and also happened to be his partymate last elections.

== Tickets ==
=== Administration coalition ===
Team Pamilyang Malabonian
#	Name	Party
For House Of Representatives
1.	Josephine Lacson-Noel	NPC
For Mayor
1.	Antolin Oreta III	Liberal
For Vice Mayor
1.	Ninong Dela Cruz	NUP
For Councilor (1st District)
4.	Edwin Dimagiba	NPC
5.	Danilo Dumalaog	Liberal
6.	Jap Garcia	Liberal
8.	Paulo Oreta	PMP
9.	Joey Sabaricos	Aksyon
12.	Leslie Yambao	UNA
For Councilor (2nd District)
7.	Jojo Lee	Liberal
8.	Sonia Lim	NPC
9.	Jeny Loquez	NPC
10.	Peng Mañalac	Liberal
12.	Enzo Oreta	NUP
14.	Mark Roque	NPC

=== Primary opposition coalition ===
Team Kakampi Malabon
#	Name	Party
For House Of Representatives
2.	Ricky Sandoval	PDP–Laban
For Mayor
2.	Jeannie Sandoval	Nacionalista
For Vice Mayor
2.	Maricar Torres	Nacionalista
For Councilor (1st District)
1.	Reinos Cortez	Nacionalista
2.	Jon Cruz	Nacionalista
3.	Miel Delos Reyes	Nacionalista
7.	Payapa Ona	Nacionalista
11.	Mac Tiangco	Nacionalista
13.	RJay Yambao	Nacionalista
For Councilor (2nd District)
2.	JC Cagaanan	Nacionalista
6.	Ivy Geronimo	Nacionalista
11.	Edward Nolasco	Nacionalista
13.	Monet Pabustan	Nacionalista
15.	Sally Trinidad	Nacionalista
16.	Nadja Marie Vicencio	Nacionalista

=== Other coalitions ===
Team Mahal Cong Malabon
#	Name	Party
For Councilor (2nd District)
3.	Dado Cunanan	NUP
4.	Rom Cunanan	NUP

Non-independents not in tickets
#	Name	Party
For Councilor (1st District)
10.	Concon San Juan	PFP

Independents
#	Name	Party
For Councilor (2nd District)
1.	Robert Aurel Ballentos	Independent
5.	Lorenzo Enriquez	Independent

== Results ==
=== For Mayor ===
Mayor Antolin Oreta III defeated Vice Mayor Jeannie Sandoval.

Malabon Mayoralty Election
Party	Candidate	Votes	%
Liberal	Antolin Oreta III (incumbent)	100,795	64.22
Nacionalista	Jeannie Sandoval	56,156	35.78
Total votes		156,951	100.00

=== For Vice Mayor ===
Councilor Bernard "Ninong" Dela Cruz defeated his fellow councilor, Maricar Torres in vice mayoral race.

Malabon Vice Mayoralty Election
Party	Candidate	Votes	%
NUP	Bernard "Ninong" Dela Cruz	83,179	56.42
Nacionalista	Maricar Torres	64,258	43.58
Total votes		147,437	100.00

=== For Representative, Lone District ===
Representative Ricky Sandoval was defeated by former Representative Josephine Lacson-Noel.

Congressional Elections for Malabon's Lone District
Party	Candidate	Votes	%
NPC	Josephine Lacson-Noel	86,001	56.72
PDP–Laban	Ricky Sandoval (incumbent)	65,629	43.28
Total votes		151,630	100.00

=== For Councilors ===
Party or alliance		Votes	%	Seats
Team Pamilyang Malabonian	Liberal Party	138,039	17.96	3
Team Pamilyang Malabonian	Nationalist People's Coalition	129,190	16.81	2
Team Pamilyang Malabonian	United Nationalist Alliance	48,278	6.28	1
Team Pamilyang Malabonian	Pwersa ng Masang Pilipino	43,287	5.63	1
Team Pamilyang Malabonian	National Unity Party	39,755	5.17	1
Team Pamilyang Malabonian	Aksyon Demokratiko	30,566	3.98	0
Team Pamilyang Malabonian	Total	429,115	55.84	8
Team Kakampi Malabon	Nacionalista Party	266,824	34.72	3
Team Mahal Cong Malabon	National Unity Party	58,813	7.65	1
Partido Federal ng Pilipinas		4,365	0.57	0
Independent		9,320	1.21	0
Ex officio seats				2
Total		768,437	100.00	14

==== First District ====
City Council Elections for Malabon's First District
Party	Candidate	Votes	%
Liberal	John Anthony "Jap" Garcia	49,324	
UNA	Maria Anna Lizza "Leslie" Yambao	48,278	
NPC	Edwin Gregorio Dimagiba (incumbent)	46,014	
PMP	Paulo Oreta	43,287	
Liberal	Danilo Dumalaog	39,880	
Nacionalista	Payapa Ona (incumbent)	36,369	
Nacionalista	Virgilio "Jon" Cruz Jr.	30,762	
Aksyon	Joey Sabaricos	30,566	
Nacionalista	Mac Tiangco	21,523	
Nacionalista	Miel Delos Reyes	18,878	
Nacionalista	Arnulfo "RJay" Yambao Jr.	18,818	
Nacionalista	Reino "Chicharon" Cortez	11,300	
PFP	Ma. Concepcion "Concon" San Juan	4,365	
Total votes		399,364	100.00

==== Second District ====
City Council Elections for Malabon's Second District
Party	Candidate	Votes	%
NUP	Jose Lorenzo "Enzo" Oreta (incumbent)	39,755	
NUP	Diosdado "Dado" Cunanan (incumbent)	38,130	
Nacionalista	Edward Nolasco (incumbent)	37,272	
Nacionalista	Nadja Marie Vicencio	35,017	
NPC	Sofronia "Sonia" Lim (incumbent)	34,983	
Liberal	Prospero Alfonso "Peng" Manalac (incumbent)	29,614	
NPC	Anthony "Mark" Roque Jr.	29,121	
NUP	Romualdo "Rom" Cunanan II	20,683	
Liberal	Hungkong "Jojo" Lee	19,221	
NPC	Jennifer "Jeny" Loquez	19,072	
Nacionalista	Ivy Geronimo	16,595	
Nacionalista	Jonathan "JC" Cagaanan	16,510	
Nacionalista	Salome "Sally" Trinidad	14,551	
Nacionalista	Monina "Monet" Pabustan	9,229	
Independent	Lorenzo Enriquez	6,649	
Independent	Robert Aurel Ballentos	2,671	
Total votes		369,073	100.00
