= Bem Noel =

Filipino politician

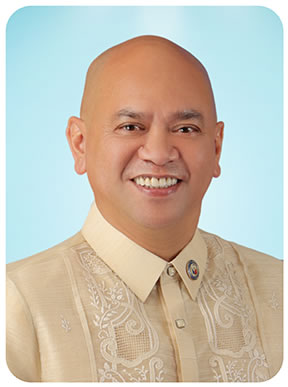
- Official portrait, 2023

Member of the Philippine House of Representatives for An Waray
- In office June 30, 2004 – June 30, 2013
- In office June 30, 2019 – September 27, 2023

Personal details
- Born: Florencio Gabriel Garcia Noel; June 17, 1966 (age 60) Tacloban, Leyte, Philippines
- Party: NPC (2024–present)
- Other political affiliations: An Waray (party-list, 2004–2013, 2018–2023); Independent (2013–2018)
- Spouse: Josephine Veronique Lacson
- Children: 3

Florencio Gabriel "Bem" Garcia Noel (born June 17, 1966) is a Filipino politician who served as representative of the An Waray party-list in the House of Representatives.

== Career ==
=== First An Waray stint ===
Noel first served in the House of Representatives as the party-list representative of An Waray from 2004 to 2013. An Waray first got involved in the lower house's partylist system in 2004.

=== Tacloban mayoral bid ===
With Noel limited by the three-term consecutive term in the Congress, he ran for mayor in his hometown of Tacloban for the 2013 election. He lost to incumbent mayor Alfred Romualdez.

=== PCSO ===
In December 2014, Noel was appointed as director of the Philippine Charity Sweepstakes Office by President Benigno Aquino III. He resigned from his position on September 15, 2015 due to expressing open support for the presidential campaign of Grace Poe for the 2016 election, instead of Aquino's preferred candidate Mar Roxas.

=== Second An Waray stint ===
In 2018, Noel announced his intent to return to the Congress as An Waray's representative once again. He filled in the lone seat An Waray was able to win in the 2019 election. He retained his role for the 2022 election.

Noel lost his seat on September 27, 2023, after the Commission on Elections (COMELEC) cancelled the registration of An Waray over alleged infractions against the party-list law. This was due to his sister Victoria assuming the role of An Waray's second representative for the 16th Congress in 2013 without a proclamation from the COMELEC.

=== Malabon congressional bid ===
On October 5, 2024, Noel filed his certificate of candidacy for representative of the lone district of Malabon City under the Nationalist People's Coalition. Noel lost in the election on May 12, 2025, finishing a distant third behind fellow ex-congressman Federico "Ricky" Sandoval II and the eventual winner, former mayor Antolin "Lenlen" Aquino Oreta III.

== Personal life ==
Noel is married to Josephine Veronique Lacson, who was a member of the House of Representatives representing Malabon, with thom they have three children. Their son Regino Federico "Nino" Noel was a city councilor of Malabon. His sister Victoria Noel also served as an An Waray representative. Noel was born in Tacloban.

== Electoral history ==
Electoral history of Bem Noel
Year	Office	Party	Votes received				Result
Year	Office	Party	Total	%	P.	Swing	Result
2004	Representative (Party-list)	An Waray	268,164	2.11%	16th	—N/a	Won
2007	Representative (Party-list)	An Waray	321,516	2.10%	17th	-0.01	Won
2010	Representative (Party-list)	An Waray	712,405	2.37%	10th	+0.27	Won
2016	Representative (Party-list)	An Waray	590,895	1.82%	16th	-0.55	Won
2019	Representative (Party-list)	An Waray	442,090	1.59%	13th	-0.23	Won
2022	Representative (Party-list)	An Waray	385,460	1.05%	56th	-0.54	Won (Note: Won re-election, but later removed from office after the Supreme Court affirmed the COMELEC's decision to cancel An Waray's registration in September 2024.)
2025	Representative (Malabon)	NPC	20,578	11.07%	3rd	—N/a	Lost
2013	Mayor of Tacloban	IND	45,307	49.16%	2nd	—N/a	Lost

== See also ==
- List of members of the Philippine House of Representatives expelled, removed, or suspended
