= Dagala =

Dagala may refer to:

- Bernardo O. Dagala, Filipino politician who served as the President of the Municipality of Malabon
- Dagala Gewog, village block of Thimphu District, Bhutan.
- Dagala del Re, frazioni of Santa Venerina, Italian municipality in the province of Catania
