= Malabon–Navotas's at-large congressional district =

Malabon–Navotas's at-large congressional district was the combined representation of the Metro Manila municipalities (now highly urbanized cities) of Malabon and Navotas in the lower house of the Congress of the Philippines (1987–2010).

Since 2010, each has been represented separately through the lone congressional districts of Malabon and Navotas.

It included Valenzuela in the defunct legislative district in the Regular Batasang Pambansa from 1984 to 1986 until Valenzuela gained separate representation, leaving the then-municipalities of Malabon and Navotas.

== Representation history ==
#	Image	Member	Term of office		Congress	Party	Electoral history
#	Image	Member	Start	End	Congress	Party	Electoral history
=== Malabon–Navotas's at-large district for the House of Representatives of the Philippines ===
District created February 2, 1987.
1		Tessie Aquino-Oreta	June 30, 1987	June 30, 1998	8th	UNIDO	Elected in 1987.
1		Tessie Aquino-Oreta	June 30, 1987	June 30, 1998	9th	LDP	Re-elected in 1992.
1		Tessie Aquino-Oreta	June 30, 1987	June 30, 1998	10th	LDP	Re-elected in 1995.
2		Ricky Sandoval	June 30, 1998	June 30, 2007	11th	Lakas	Elected in 1998.
2		Ricky Sandoval	June 30, 1998	June 30, 2007	12th	Liberal	Re-elected in 2001.
2		Ricky Sandoval	June 30, 1998	June 30, 2007	13th	Liberal	Re-elected in 2004.
3		Alvin Sandoval	June 30, 2007	November 17, 2009	14th	Lakas	Elected in 2007. Removed from office by the House Electoral Tribunal after an electoral protest.
4		Josephine Lacson-Noel	November 17, 2009	June 30, 2010	14th	NPC	Declared winner of the 2007 elections. Redistricted to Malabon's at-large district.
District dissolved into Malabon and Navotas's at-large districts.
