= Jeannie Sandoval =

Filipino politician

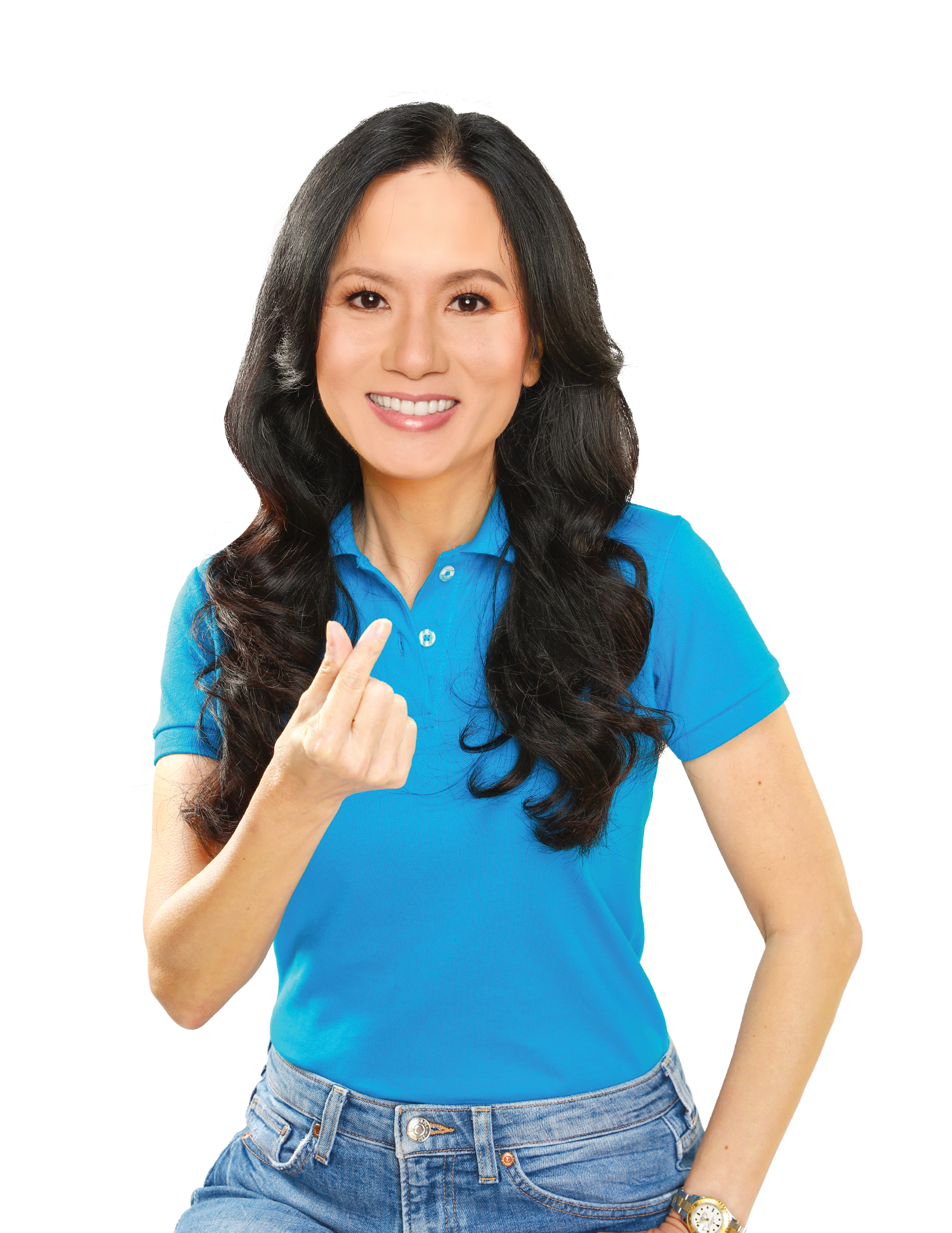
- Jeannie Sandoval in 2022

Mayor of Malabon
- Incumbent
- Assumed office June 30, 2022
- Vice Mayor: Bernard dela Cruz (2022-2025); Edward Nolasco (2025-present)
- Preceded by: Antolin Oreta III

Vice Mayor of Malabon
- In office June 30, 2013 – June 30, 2019
- Mayor: Antolin Oreta III
- Preceded by: Diosdado Cunanan (acting)
- Succeeded by: Bernard "Ninong" Dela Cruz

Personal details
- Born: Jeannie L. Ng; January 14, 1965 (age 61)
- Party: Nacionalista (2015–present)
- Other political affiliations: UNA (2012–2015); Liberal (2004)
- Spouse: Federico Sandoval II
- Children: 1
- Education: De La Salle University (BS)
- Occupation: Politician

Jeannie L. Ng Sandoval (born January 14, 1965) is a Filipino politician who is currently serving as the Mayor of Malabon since 2022. She previously served as Vice Mayor of Malabon from 2013 to 2019. She also served as chairperson of the Philippine Red Cross-Malabon City Chapter, president of Genesis Industrial Gases Corporation, and president of Soroptimist International of Malabon from 2008 to 2016.

== Early life and education ==
Jeannie Ng was born on January 14, 1965, to her mother Lucy Ong Ng. She finished elementary and high school at Saint Stephen's High School in 1981. She finished her bachelor's degree in Computer Science at De La Salle University in 1985.

== Political career ==
In 2004, she ran for Mayor as a Liberal, but lost to then-ABC President Canuto Senen "Tito" Oreta. A few days prior to election day, she said that if ever she got elected, she will turn the city into a "food city".

=== Vice Mayor of Malabon (2013–2019) ===
In 2013, she ran for vice mayor under the United Nationalist Alliance and won with a margin of 575 votes against her closest rival, then-Counselor Edwin Dimaguiba.

In 2016, she ran for re-election under Nacionalista Party, with her running mate Josephine Veronique "Jaye" Lacson-Noel, the incumbent representative at that time. Her husband, former Malabon-Navotas Rep. Federico "Ricky" Sandoval II also ran. She and her husband won the elections, but her running mate lost to incumbent Mayor Antolin "Lenlen" Oreta III.

In 2019, although eligible to run for third and final term as vice mayor, she ran for mayor but lost against incumbent mayor Antolin "Lenlen" Oreta III.

=== Mayor of Malabon (2022–present) ===
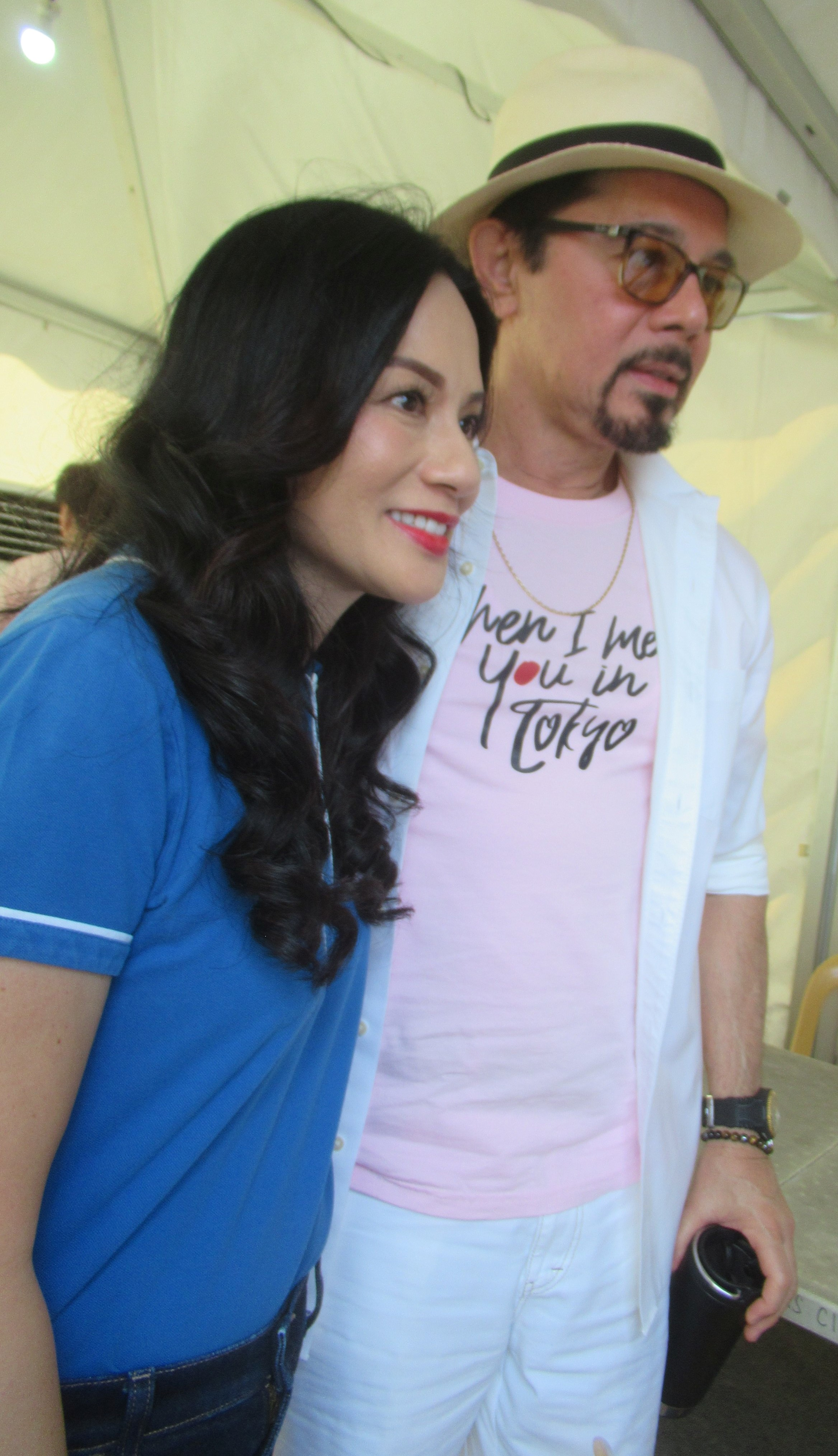
Sandoval with Christopher De Leon

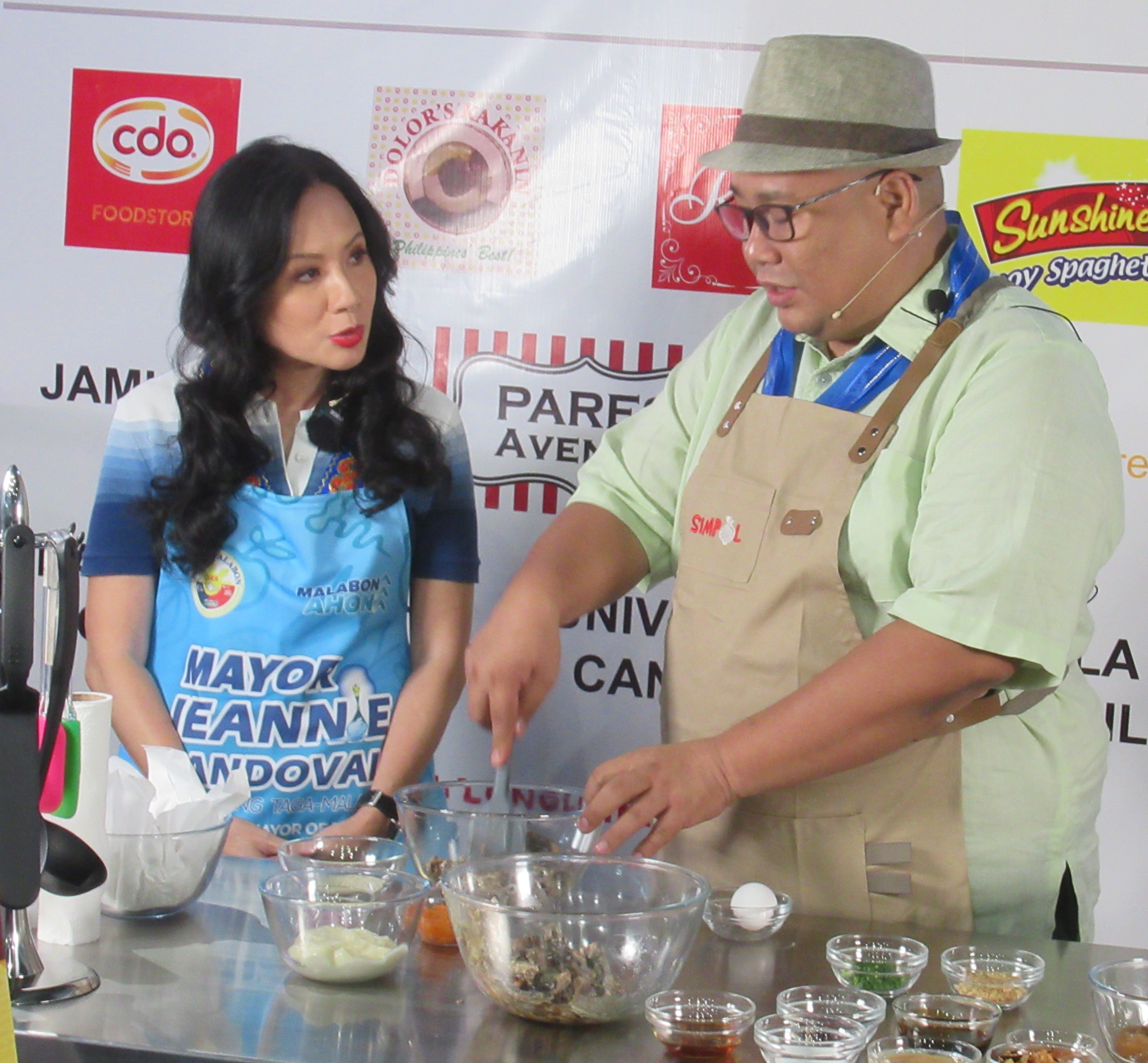
Sandoval with Chef Myke "Tatung" Sarthou

In 2022, she ran for mayor for the first time and won against Councilor Jose Lorenzo "Enzo" Oreta, brother of then-outgoing Mayor Antolin "Lenlen" Oreta III making her the city's first elected lady mayor.

During her first 100 days as the city's chief executive, she named her accomplishments as:

- Handover of 37 housing units in Barangay Panghulo to informal settler families (ISFs).
- Distribution of 42 certificates of land allocation in Barangay Longos to the active members of the Naglakar Homeowners Association.
- Signed a Memorandum of Understanding (MoU) for the implementation of the housing program with Department of Human Settlements and Urban Development (DHSUD) Secretary Jose Rizalino Acuzar.
- Ensured that the city newly registered 868 Persons with Disabilities (PwD) and that 76 of them were given assistive devices.
- Declared the PHP 7,000,000 medical financial assistance was provided by the city to benefit 5,591 people.
- Establishment of the Malabon Shelter and Housing Office to support families in need.
- Completion of San Lorenzo Ruiz General Hospital construction.
- More support to businesses and jobs impacted by the pandemic.
- Regularization of job orders, casual, and contractual city hall employees.
- Improve local government services by streamlining processes and widening the adoption of technology.

On December 21, 2022, she signed a memorandum of agreement (MOA) with the Development Bank of the Philippines (DBP) and the Universal Storefront Services Corporation (USSC) to launch the “Malabon Ahon Blue Card.” The blue card is meant for the Malabon City Government to distribute financial aid to resident households who are registered in Malabon City Social Welfare and Development Department.

On March 21, 2025, Sandoval participated in the "Longest Line of Bowls of Noodles" with 6,549 bowls in Guinness World Records held at the Malabon Sports Center.

On May 12, 2025, she ran for mayor for the second time and won against Malabon representative Josephine Veronique "Jaye" Noel-Lacson.

=== Waste management complaint ===
On April 10, 2025, a criminal complaint alleging graft was filed with the Office of the Ombudsman against Sandoval in connection with a municipal solid waste management contract with Metro Waste Solid Waste Management Corporation. The complaint was filed by Malabon resident Editha Nadarisay, with the Alliance of Concerned Citizens of Santulan supporting the complaint. The complaint concerned a contract reportedly valued at approximately ₱139 million.

According to the complaint, the contractor allegedly failed to consistently collect garbage in parts of Malabon, resulting in accumulated waste in streets and residential areas. The complainant also alleged that the contractor lacked necessary permits from the Department of Environment and Natural Resources (DENR), and that complaints concerning waste collection were not adequately addressed by the city's City Environment and Natural Resources Office. The complaint alleged violations of Republic Act No. 3019, the Anti-Graft and Corrupt Practices Act, and Republic Act No. 9003, the Ecological Solid Waste Management Act of 2000.

The complaint followed actions taken by the city government against Metro Waste. In September 2024, the city government issued a cease-and-desist order against the company concerning its use of the Malabon Transfer Facility after complaints about foul odor, improper waste handling, and accumulated unsegregated waste. The city government later terminated the company's contract after stating that the contractor had failed to address the concerns and that there had also been complaints about delays in garbage collection.

=== Commission on Audit findings ===
In 2024, the Commission on Audit (COA) raised concerns regarding the financial records of the Malabon City government in its audit of the city's 2023 accounts. In a May 16, 2024 letter to Sandoval, COA said that the reported year-end Cash in Bank balance of ₱2.183 billion was unreliable because of discrepancies amounting to ₱392.859 million when compared with the city's cashbook and ₱24.877 million when compared with bank confirmation. COA attributed the discrepancies in part to the absence of reconciliation between the subsidiary ledger and cashbook and delays in the preparation and submission of bank reconciliation statements.

COA also questioned the reliability of the city's ₱4.265 billion Property, Plant and Equipment account. The audit identified discrepancies between accounting records and physical inventory reports, including 36 missing property units valued at ₱4.473 million and an unreconciled discrepancy of ₱497.258 million.

In September 2024, COA issued a notice of suspension concerning expenses associated with a six-day official delegation trip to Tokyo, Japan, from December 17 to 23, 2023. The notice covered 35 participants, including Sandoval, with reported expenses of ₱304,095.32 per participant, or ₱10.643 million in total. COA requested additional documentation, including flight itineraries, a letter of invitation from the United Nations Development Programme, and the relevant travel order.

Sandoval denied allegations of corruption concerning the trip and said that the notice of suspension resulted from missing or unsigned supporting documents. She maintained that the expenses were covered by the city's approved supplemental budget and that the trip formed part of the city's programs, projects and activities.

=== Controversy over use of mayoral image ===
In July 2023, Sandoval faced criticism after certificates distributed during moving-up ceremonies in Malabon featured a prominent photograph of her. Students and parents criticized the inclusion of the mayor's image on the certificates.

The Malabon City government said the certificates were intended to recognize the achievements of the students and their families. The Department of Education, through its spokesperson, clarified that the certificates were separate from the official Certificates of Completion issued by the department and were an initiative of the local government to recognize Malabon learners.

In August 2023, Sandoval's name and photograph also attracted attention after appearing on cake cards distributed during a city-sponsored mass wedding. The incident was reported by Interaksyon, which noted that the episode followed the earlier controversy involving the moving-up certificates.

== Personal life ==
She is married to former Malabon representative Federico "Ricky" Sandoval II. They have one son. Jeannie's mother died on May 22, 2026.
