= Mayor of Malabon =

Head of local government of Malabon, Metro Manila, Philippines

- Punong Lungsod ng Malabon
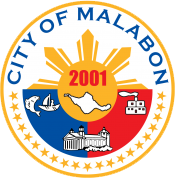
- Seal of the City of Malabon

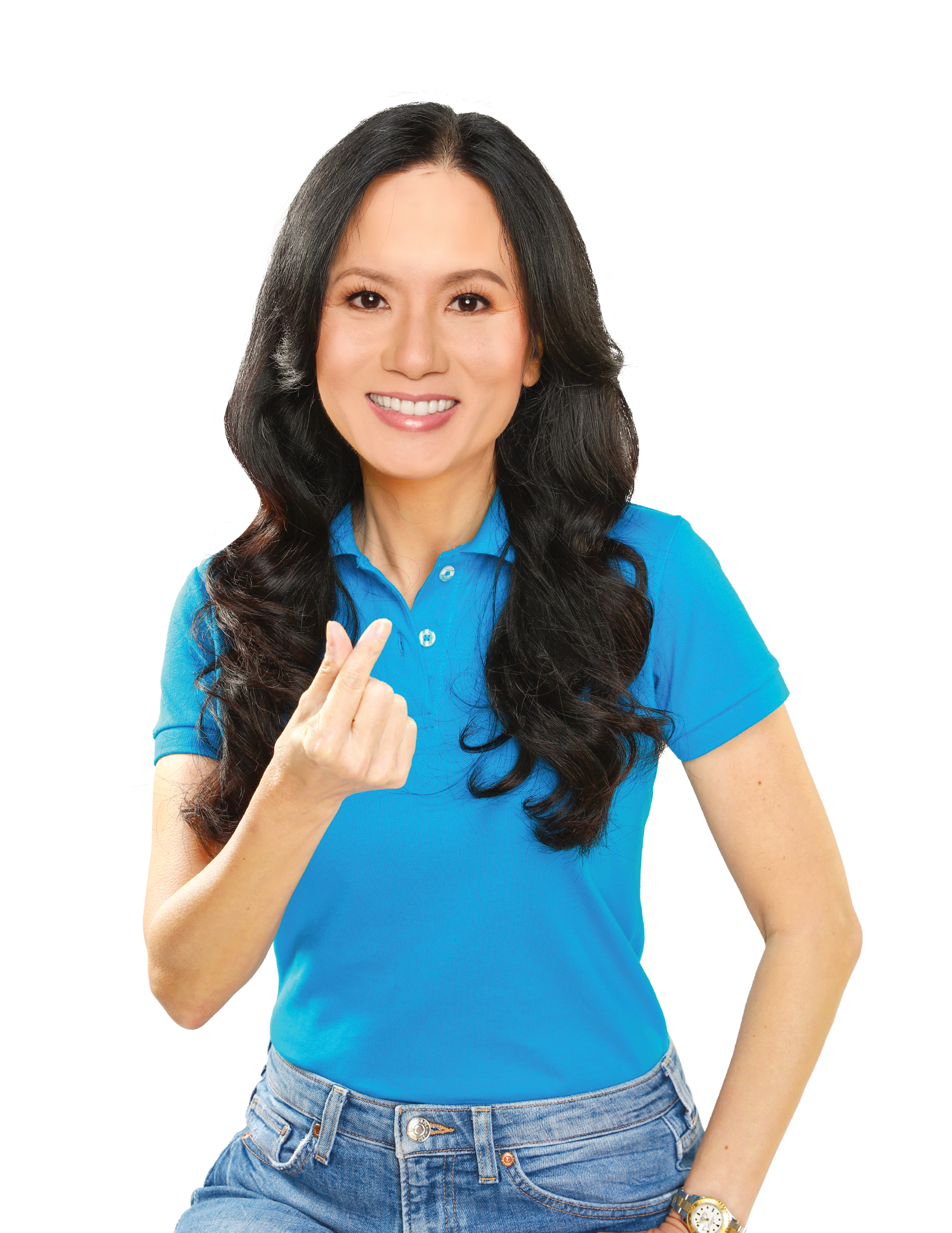
- Incumbent; Jeannie Ng-Sandoval since June 30, 2022
- Style: Mayora
- Seat: Malabon City Hall
- Appointer: Elected via popular vote
- Term length: 3 years
- Inaugural holder: Bernardo Dagala
- Formation: 1903

The Mayor of Malabon (Filipino: Punong Lungsod ng Malabon) is the chief executive of the local government of Malabon in Metro Manila, Philippines. The mayor leads the city's departments in executing ordinances and delivering public services. The mayorship is a three-year term and each mayor is restricted to three consecutive terms, totaling nine years, although a mayor can be elected again after an interruption of one term.

The current mayor of Malabon is Jeannie Ng-Sandoval since 2022.

== List ==
Names in italic were acting in capacity.

Name	Deputy (later Vice Mayor)	Term
Municipal Mayor of Malabon
Bernardo Dagala		1903-1905
Angel Luna		1909-1911
Basilio Bautista	Miguel Garcia	1918-1921
Teofilo Santos		1922-1927
Sinfroso Pascual		1928-1930
Teofilo Santos	Jose Camus	1931-1936
Eleuterio de Jesus		1937-1939
Francisco Barican		1939
Jose Geukeko		1940-1945
Victor Gaza		1945
Paterio Aquino		1946-1951
Florante Villegas		1952-1955
Paterio Aquino	Agapito Cruz	1955-1959
Lucio Gutierrez		1959-1971
Jose Cruz		1971
Maynardo Espiritu		1972-1986
Cipriano Lacson	Florentino Cruz	1987-1988
Prospero "Peng" Oreta	Lulu Gutierrez Yambao (1988-1992); Amado "Boy" Vicencio (1992–1995)	1988-1995
Amado "Boy" Vicencio	Brigido Abad (1995-1998); Mark Allan Jay Yambao (1998–2001)	1995-2001
City Mayor of Malabon
Amado "Boy" Vicencio	Mark Allan Jay Yambao	2001-2002
Mark Allan Jay Yambao	Benjamin Galauran	2002-2003
Amado "Boy" Vicencio	Mark Allan Jay Yambao	2003-2004
Mark Allan Jay Yambao	Benjamin Galauran	2004
Tito Oreta	Arnold Vicencio (2004–2010); Antolin Oreta III (2010–2012)	2004-2012
Antolin Oreta III	Diosdado Cunanan (2012–2013); Jeannie Ng-Sandoval (2013–2019); Bernard Dela Cruz (2019–2022)	2012–2022
Jeannie Ng-Sandoval	Bernard Dela Cruz (2022-2025); Edward C. Nolasco (2025-present)	2022–present
