= Tito Oreta =

Filipino politician

Mayor of Malabon
- In office June 30, 2004 – September 3, 2012
- Vice Mayor: Arnold Vicencio (2004–2010); Antolin Oreta III (2010–2012)
- Preceded by: Amado Vicencio, Sr.
- Succeeded by: Antolin Oreta III

President of the Association of Barangay Chairmen (ABC), Malabon
- In office June 30, 2000 – June 30, 2002

Chairman of Barangay Maysilo, Malabon
- In office June 30, 2002 – June 30, 2004
- In office June 30, 1994 – June 30, 1998

Personal details
- Born: July 30, 1939 Malabon, Rizal, Commonwealth of the Philippines
- Died: September 3, 2012 (aged 73) Quezon City, Philippines
- Party: Lakas-Kampi/Lakas–CMD (2009–2012); Lakas–CMD (1991) (2004–2009)
- Spouse: Ma. Aranzazu "Aring" Dionisio
- Relations: Celia A. Oreta-Matute (sister); Ma. Rosario "Charito" A. Oreta-Lapus (sister); Antolin "Len" A. Oreta, Jr. (brother); Edgardo "Eddy" A. Oreta (brother); Antonio "Tony" A. Oreta (brother)
- Children: 5
- Education: Mapúa Institute of Technology
- Profession: Civil engineer

Canuto Senen "Tito" Adriano Oreta (July 30, 1939 – September 3, 2012) was a Filipino politician who was Mayor of Malabon.

== Early life ==
Born Canuto Senen Adriano Oreta on July 30, 1939, in Barangay Maysilo, Malabon, Metro Manila. He was the second of six children: Celia, Charito (with her husband Jaime), Antolin Jr. "Len" (with his wife Tessie Aquino-Oreta) Eddy and Tony.

== Personal life ==
=== Family ===
He was married to Maria Aranzazu "Aring" Dionisio-Oreta and had 5 children:

- Gerardo "Dondi" D. Oreta & Marie Antonette "Tonet" Gatchalian-Oreta, with 2 daughters: Patricia & Amanda
- Maria Agnes "Nina" Oreta-Hewitt & Carl Hewitt, and daughter Sadie
- Victor Antolin "Vic" D. Oreta & Ma. Cecilia "Cecile" Solidum-Oreta, with 2 children: Michelle & Miguel
- Ramon D. Oreta & Jennifer Yu, and son Logan
- Paulo Alberto D. Oreta & Cindy Tan-Oreta, with 3 children: Nicole, PJ and Pauline

He was the brother-in-law of former Senator Tessie Aquino-Oreta.

== Educational life ==
- Elementary: St. James Academy, Malabon (1944-1951)
- High School: University of the Philippines Integrated School, Quezon City (1951-1955)
- College: Mapúa Institute of Technology, Intramuros, Manila (1955-1960)
- Others: Armed Forces of the Philippines - Home Defense Training (1976 & 1977), Jungle Warfare Mountain Operation/Ranger Course (1987), Passer of the Board Examination For Civil Engineers in July 1969

== Political career ==
Before becoming the Malabon Mayor, he served as the Barangay Captain of Maysilo for several terms. Barangay Maysilo bestowed upon him the honor of being their Outstanding Barangay Captain in 1989. And then, the CAMANAVA Press Corps recognized him as 1994 Outstanding Barangay Captain in the North Sector of Metropolitan Manila. For three consecutive terms, he was elected as President of Malabon Association of Barangay Captains, which automatically called him as City Councilor to the Sangguniang Panlungsod ng Malabon.

He ran for congressman representing the district of Malabon–Navotas but lost to Federico "Ricky" Sandoval II.

He served for another term as chairman of Barangay Maysilo from 2002 until 2004, when he ran for mayor under the Nationalist People’s Coalition banner and won. He won a second and third term in 2007 and 2010, respectively, unopposed for the last 2 terms.

Oreta filed for indefinite leave as a mayor in January 2012. He was temporarily absent in February due to declining health, and he assumed the position of acting mayor Antolin Oreta III in March.

== Illness and death ==
In 2010, Oreta was diagnosed with lung cancer. He smoked several packs of cigarettes a day. He was diagnosed with stage four cancer in 2011.

Oreta died at 10:00 am on September 3, 2012, while suffering from lung cancer, news reports said. Oreta died of “multiple organ failure”, at the St. Luke's Medical Center in Quezon City. He was 73 years old. The remains of Mayor Tito Oreta was transferred from his Maysilo residence to the Malabon City Hall on September 7, 10:00 AM. A mass was held at the Malabon Amphitheater at 8 pm followed by a necrological ceremony. The last Mass was held at San Bartolome Church at 9:00 am. His remains were then cremated and interred on September 8, 2012, at the Loyola Memorial Park in Marikina.
