= Bernardo Dagala =

Filipino politician

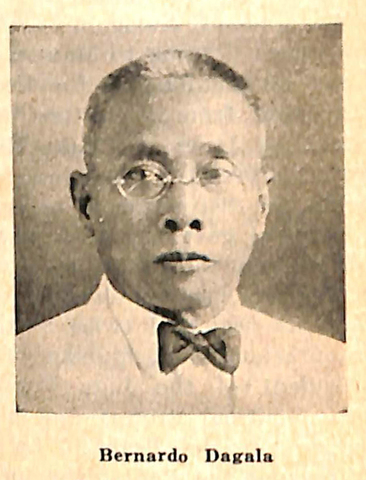
- Dagala in 1939

Municipal President of Malabon
- In office 1903–1905
- Preceded by: Position created
- Succeeded by: Ángel Luna (as Municipal President of Malabon); Hermogenes Monroy (as Municipal President of Navotas)

Personal details
- Born: Bernardo Oliveros Dagala; August 20, 1869 Tambobong, Manila, Captaincy General of the Philippines, Spanish Empire
- Died: August 16, 1966 (aged 96) Malabon, Rizal, Philippines
- Occupation: Politician

Bernardo Oliveros Dagala (August 20, 1869 – August 16, 1966) was a Filipino politician who lived in and served as the municipal president of Malabon from 1903 until 1905, when Malabon annexed its neighbor Navotas through the Philippine Commission Act No. 942.

A native of Navotas, Dagala opposed the annexation and campaigned for its independence. In 1906, Navotas was again granted independence as a distinct municipality through Philippine Commission Act No. 142.
