= Malabon's at-large congressional district =

Legislative district of the Philippines

- Constituency for the House of Representatives of the Philippines
- Map of Metro Manila showing the location of Malabon.
- City: Malabon
- Region: Metro Manila
- Population: 380,522 (2020)
- Electorate: 233,868 (2025)
- Major settlements: Malabon
- Area: 15.71 km^{2} (6.07 sq mi)

Current constituency
- Created: 2007
- Representative: Antolin Oreta III
- Political party: NUP
- Congressional bloc: Majority

Malabon's at-large congressional district is the congressional district of the Philippines in Malabon. It has been represented in the House of Representatives of the Philippines since 2010. Previously included in Malabon–Navotas's at-large congressional district, it includes all barangays of the city. It is currently represented in the 20th Congress by Antolin Oreta III of the National Unity Party (NUP).

== Representation history ==
#	Image	Member	Term of office		Congress	Party	Electoral history
#	Image	Member	Start	End	Congress	Party	Electoral history
=== Malabon's at-large district for the House of Representatives of the Philippines ===
District created March 10, 2007.
1		Josephine Lacson-Noel	June 30, 2010	June 30, 2016	15th	NPC	Redistricted from Malabon–Navotas district and re-elected in 2010.
1		Josephine Lacson-Noel	June 30, 2010	June 30, 2016	16th	NPC	Re-elected in 2013.
2		Ricky Sandoval	June 30, 2016	June 30, 2019	17th	PDP–Laban	Elected in 2016.
(1)		Josephine Lacson-Noel	June 30, 2019	June 30, 2025	18th	NPC	Elected in 2019.
(1)		Josephine Lacson-Noel	June 30, 2019	June 30, 2025	19th	NPC	Re-elected in 2022.
3		Antolin Oreta III	June 30, 2025	Incumbent	20th	NUP	Elected in 2025.

== Election results ==
=== 2010 ===
Philippine House of Representatives election at Malabon
Party	Candidate	Votes	%
NPC	Josephine Lacson-Noel	52,815	40.25
PMP	Arnold Vicencio	42,961	32.74
Lakas–Kampi	Federico Sandoval II	27,506	20.96
Lakas–Kampi	Mark Allan Yambao	7,640	5.82
Independent	Bobby Genorga	283	0.22
Valid ballots		131,205	94.52
Invalid or blank votes		7,600	5.48
Total votes		138,805	100.00
NPC win (new seat)			

=== 2013 ===
2013 Philippine House of Representatives election at Malabon
Party	Candidate	Votes	%
NPC	Josephine Lacson-Noel	81,634	
Margin of victory			
Rejected ballots			
Turnout			
NPC hold			

=== 2016 ===
2016 Philippine House of Representatives election in Malabon's Lone District
Party	Candidate	Votes	%
NPC	Ricky Sandoval	69,887	50.0
Liberal	Teresa Aquino-Oreta	68,108	48.7
Independent	Robin Simon	1,886	1.3
Invalid or blank votes		13,639	
Total votes		153,520	100%
NPC hold			

=== 2019 ===
2019 Philippine House of Representatives election in Malabon's Lone District
Party	Candidate	Votes	%
NPC	Josephine Lacson-Noel	86,001	56.71
PDP–Laban	Ricky Sandoval	65,629	43.28
Valid ballots		151,630	93.70
Invalid or blank votes		10,193	6.30
Total votes		161,823	100%
NPC gain from PDP–Laban			

=== 2022 ===
2022 Philippine House of Representatives election in Malabon's Lone District
Party	Candidate	Votes	%
NPC	Josephine Lacson-Noel	102,320	56.09%
PDP–Laban	Ricky Sandoval	80,089	43.91%
Total votes		182,409	100.00
NPC hold			

=== 2025 ===
2025 Philippine House of Representatives election in Malabon's Lone District
Party	Candidate	Votes	%
NUP	Antolin "Lenlen" Oreta III	84,940	36.32
Lakas	Federico "Ricky" Sandoval II	67,824	29.00
NPC	Florencio Gabriel "Bem" Noel	20,578	8.80
PDP–Laban	Bernard "Ninong" Dela Cruz	12,480	5.34
Total votes		186,002	100.00
NUP hold			

== See also ==
- Legislative district of Malabon
