= San Lorenzo Ruiz General Hospital =

Government hospital in Malabon, Philippines

Geography
- Location: Malabon, Metro Manila, Philippines
- Coordinates: 14°41′17″N 120°57′19″E

Services
- Beds: 200

History
- Former names: San Lorenzo Ruiz Municipal Hospital (1990–1998); San Lorenzo Ruiz Women's Hospital (1998–2019)
- Founded: March 8, 1990 (as municipal hospital); October 1999 (as retained hospital)

Links
- Website: slrwh.doh.gov.ph

The San Lorenzo Ruiz General Hospital is a government hospital in the Philippines with an authorized bed capacity of two hundred (200). It is located in Malabon, Metro Manila.

== History ==
On March 8, 1990, President Corazon Aquino approved the law to establish municipal hospital with 10-bed capacity at Santulan, Malabon, which originally title as San Lorenzo Ruiz Municipal Hospital. In December 1998, it was renamed title as San Lorenzo Ruiz Women’s Hospital. In October 1999, it was now become a retained hospital under the Department of Health.

The groundbreaking ceremony for the new hospital was held on January 29, 2019 located at Panghulo, Malabon. On April 12, 2019, President Rodrigo Duterte signs the law upgrade to 200-bed capacity and it is renamed as San Lorenzo Ruiz General Hospital. On September 29, 2025, the new hospital opened in Panghulo, Malabon.
