= Legislative district of Malabon–Navotas =

Legislative district of the Philippines

The Legislative district of Malabon–Navotas was the combined representation of the Metropolitan Manila municipalities (now highly urbanized cities) of Malabon and Navotas in the lower house of the Congress of the Philippines from 1987 to 2010.

Since 2010, each has been represented separately through the lone congressional districts of Malabon and Navotas.

== History ==
Prior to gaining joint representation, areas now under the respective jurisdictions of Malabon and Navotas were represented under Rizal (1907–1972), Region IV (1978–1984), and the parliamentary district of Malabon–Navotas–Valenzuela (1984–1986).

Under the new Constitution which was proclaimed on 11 February 1987, the independent Metro Manila municipalities of Malabon and Navotas constituted a single congressional district, and elected its member to the restored House of Representatives starting that same year.

The enactment of Republic Act No. 9387 on 10 March 2007 and its subsequent approval by plebiscite on 24 June 2007 converted Navotas into a highly urbanized city. Per Section 58 of R.A. 9387 Navotas was constituted into its own congressional district, which effectively created separate representation for Malabon as well. Both cities elected their separate representatives in the 2010 elections.

== Lone District (defunct) ==
- Municipalities: Malabon (became highly urbanized city 2001), Navotas (became highly urbanized city 2007)

Period	Representative
8th Congress; 1987–1992	Tessie Aquino-Oreta
9th Congress; 1992–1995	Tessie Aquino-Oreta
10th Congress; 1995–1998	Tessie Aquino-Oreta
11th Congress; 1998–2001	Federico S. Sandoval II
12th Congress; 2001–2004	Federico S. Sandoval II
13th Congress; 2004–2007	Federico S. Sandoval II
14th Congress; 2007–2010	Alvin S. Sandoval^{1}
14th Congress; 2007–2010	Josephine Veronique R. Lacson-Noel^{2}

^{1} Unseated on 24 September 2009 after losing electoral protest to Josephine Veronique Lacson-Noel.
^{2} Took oath of office on 17 November 2009 after winning electoral protest against Alvin Sandoval, per House of Representatives Electoral Tribunal decision that was upheld by the Supreme Court on 9 March 2009.

== See also ==
- Legislative districts of Rizal
- Legislative district of Malabon–Navotas–Valenzuela
- Legislative district of Malabon
- Legislative district of Navotas
