= An Waray =

Political party in Philippines

- — Philippine partylist —
- Founded: 2001; 25 years ago
- Delisted: 2023
- Ideology: Waray regionalism

Current representation (19th Congress)
- Seats in the House of Representatives: 0 / 3 (Out of 63 party-list seats)
- Representative(s): Bem Noel (unseated on 2023; partylist accreditation nullified)

An Waray was a party-list in the Philippines, mainly based on the islands of Leyte, Samar and Biliran.

In the 2004 elections for the House of Representatives An Waray got 268,164 votes (2.1079% of the nationwide vote) and one seat (Florencio Noel). An Waray Party List is a democratic multi-sectoral party-list organization that envisions a just, progressive and peaceful Filipino society characterized by its principles katilingban (sense of community), kahimyang (peace) and kauswagan (progress) through the adoption of a community-based and peace oriented development agenda.

An Waray had its registration cancelled by the Commission on Elections for letting its second nominee assume office in 2013 despite being entitled to only a seat, violating the Party-List System Act. The ruling was affirmed on August 14, 2023, by the commission en banc; and was upheld by the Supreme Court in a decision promulgated on August 6, 2024.

== Electoral performance ==
Election	Votes	%	Seats
2004	268,164	2.11%	1
2007	321,516	2.01%	1
2010	712,405	2.39%	2
2013	540,906	1.97%	1
2016	590,895	1.82%	1
2019	440,228	1.59%	1
2022	385,460	1.05%	1

== Representatives to Congress ==
Period	1st Representative	2nd Representative
12th Congress; 2004–2007	Bem Noel	—N/a
13th Congress; 2007–2010	Bem Noel	—N/a
14th Congress; 2010–2013	Bem Noel	Neil Montejo
16th Congress; 2013–2016	Neil Montejo	Victoria Noel; Unrecognized (Note: An Waray was initially entitled to two seats following the 2013 election. However after a re-computation ordered by the Supreme Court it was determined that An Waray only secured one seat. Victoria Noel assumed position as An Waray's second representative without a proclamation from the Commission on Election. She was the third nominee, with second nominee Philip Jude Acidre resigning from the role.)
16th Congress; 2016–2019	Victoria Noel	—N/a
18th Congress; 2019–2022	Bem Noel	—N/a
19th Congress; 2022–2025	Bem Noel; Removed on September 27, 2023	—N/a
Note: A party-list group, can win a maximum of three seats in the House of Representatives.
