= Tessie Aquino-Oreta =

Filipina politician (1944–2020)

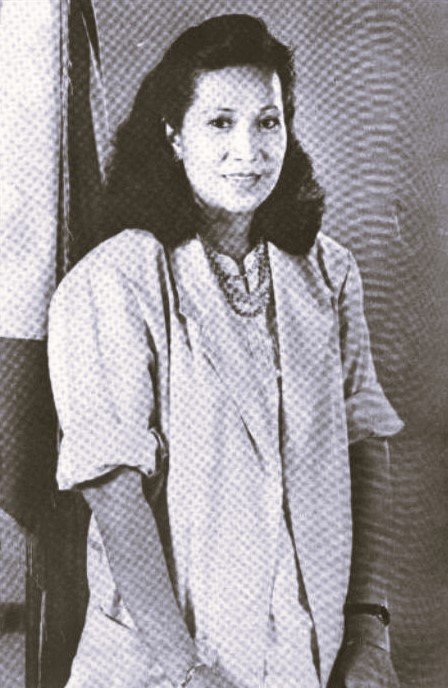
- Aquino-Oreta official portrait during the 8th Congress.

Senator of the Philippines
- In office June 30, 1998 – June 30, 2004

Member of the Philippine House of Representatives from Malabon–Navotas
- In office June 30, 1987 – June 30, 1998
- Preceded by: Post created
- Succeeded by: Ricky Sandoval

Personal details
- Born: Maria Teresa Aquino Aquino; June 28, 1944 Concepcion, Tarlac, Philippine Commonwealth
- Died: May 14, 2020 (aged 75) Manila, Philippines
- Resting place: Loyola Memorial Park Marikina, Philippines
- Party: Liberal (2015–2020)
- Other political affiliations: NPC (2007–2015); LDP (1988–2007); UNIDO (1987–1988)
- Spouse: Antolin A. Oreta Jr.
- Children: 4 (including Lenlen)
- Parent: Benigno Aquino Sr. (father)
- Relatives: Aquino family Tito Oreta (brother-in-law)
- Education: Assumption College
- Occupation: Politician

Military service
- Allegiance: Philippines
- Branch/service: Philippine Air Force
- Rank: Lieutenant Colonel
- Unit: Reserve

Maria Teresa Aquino-Oreta (born Maria Teresa Aquino Aquino; June 28, 1944 – May 14, 2020), better known as Tessie Aquino-Oreta, was a Filipina politician. She was the chairperson of the Senate Committee on Education, Arts and Culture in the 11th Congress.

== Early life and education ==
Maria Teresa Aquino was born on June 28, 1944, to Benigno Aquino Sr. and Aurora Aquino-Aquino. She was the youngest of the Aquino children of Tarlac. Her siblings included Ninoy Aquino, who was assassinated in 1983, and Butz Aquino.

She attended primary school at the College of the Holy Spirit Manila in Mendiola and high school at Assumption Convent. She graduated with a degree in literature and history from Assumption Convent (now Assumption College). She received her International Studies degree in Ciudad Ducal, Avila, Spain. She completed her master's degree at the National Security Administration from the National Defense College of the Philippines, earning the rank of lieutenant colonel (reserve) in the Philippine Air Force.

== Congressional career ==
=== House of Representatives ===
Before being elected to the Senate in 1998, she represented the lone district of Malabon-Navotas in the House of Representatives for three consecutive terms, from 1987 to 1998.

In the Lower House, she authored and co-authored about 280 bills, of which 79 were enacted into laws, and proposed 101 local and national resolutions (20 were adopted). She became the Assistant Majority Floor Leader during the 8th Congress in 1987 and during the 10th Congress in 1995, becoming the first woman Assistant Majority Floor Leader in the history of the House of Representatives.

=== Senate ===
In the 1998 national elections, she was elected senator under the opposition Laban ng Makabayang Masang Pilipino (LAMMP) banner. In the three years she was in office, Aquino-Oreta filed 197 Senate Bills (authored and co-authored) and resolutions.

==== Estrada impeachment trial ====
She participated in the impeachment trial of former president Joseph Estrada and was one of the 11 senators who voted against the opening of a second envelope of bank records. After the vote, she was caught on camera doing a jig, which earned her the nickname "dancing queen" and offended some people. She apologized for the incident in a widely-broadcast political advertisement. She subsequently ran for the Senate and was defeated. She has not been elected to public office since.

== Comeback attempts ==
Oreta ran for Senator in 2007 under the administration TEAM Unity coalition, but lost, placing 23rd. Oreta ran as Congresswoman in Malabon in the 2016 elections, but lost to former representative Ricky Sandoval.

== Personal life and death ==
She was married to businessman Antolin A. Oreta Jr., who served as presidential consultant on economic zones during the Estrada administration. They had four children: Rissa, Antolin ("Lenlen") III, Karmela and adopted son Lorenzo (Enzo). Her sons Lenlen and Enzo became mayor and councilor of Malabon, respectively. She died on May 14, 2020, at the age of 75 from cancer.
