= Antolin Oreta III =

Filipino politician

Lenlen Oreta
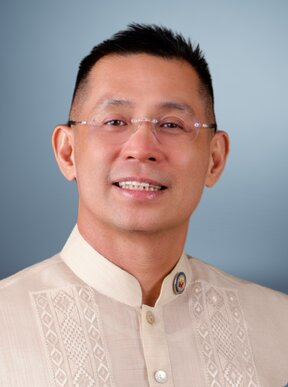
- Official portrait, 2026

Member of the Philippine House of Representatives from Malabon's Lone District
- Incumbent
- Assumed office June 30, 2025
- Preceded by: Josephine Lacson-Noel

Mayor of Malabon
- In office September 3, 2012 (Note: Acting from March 1 to September 3, 2012.) – June 30, 2022
- Vice Mayor: Diosdado Cunanan (Acting, 2012–2013); Jeannie Sandoval (2013–2019); Bernard dela Cruz (2019–2022)
- Preceded by: Tito Oreta
- Succeeded by: Jeannie Sandoval

Vice Mayor of Malabon
- In office June 30, 2010 – March 1, 2012
- Mayor: Tito Oreta
- Preceded by: Arnold Vicencio
- Succeeded by: Diosdado Cunanan

Member of the Malabon City Council
- In office June 30, 2007 – June 30, 2010

Personal details
- Born: Antolin Aquino Oreta III; September 16, 1971 (age 54)
- Party: NUP (2024–present)
- Other political affiliations: Liberal (2009–2024); NPC (2007–2009); LDP (2006–2007)
- Spouse: Melissa Grace Sison (m. 2014)
- Parent: Tessie Aquino-Oreta (mother)
- Relatives: Aquino family Tito Oreta (uncle)
- Education: Sophia University (BS)
- Occupation: Politician

Antolin "Lenlen" Aquino Oreta III (born September 16, 1971), is a Filipino politician who has served as a member of the House of Representatives representing the at-large district of Malabon since 2025. He was mayor of Malabon from 2012 to 2022 and Vice Mayor from 2010 up until his succession as mayor. He is the son of former senator Tessie Aquino-Oreta.

== Early life and education ==
Oreta was born on September 16, 1971, as the second of the four children of businessman Antolin Oreta Jr. and former senator Tessie Aquino-Oreta. He completed his elementary and secondary education at the Ateneo de Manila University in Manila. He earned a bachelor's science degree in Japanese Studies and Business at Sophia University in Tokyo.

== Professional career ==
Before entering politics, Oreta had a minor acting role in the 1989 film Dear Diary. He worked as an Associate for Keppel Securities from 1995 to 1997 and Assistant Vice President Dealer at Merrill Lynch. He also became Dealer and Vice President for Finance at ABN-AMRO Securities and Intra Strata Assurance Corporation consecutively.

== Political career ==
Oreta started his political career under the Nationalist People's Coalition when he ran as Councilor of Malabon in 2007.

=== Vice Mayor (2010-2012) ===
In 2010, he was elected as Vice Mayor of the same city, this time under the Liberal Party,

=== Mayor (2012-2022) ===
In March 2012, Oreta assumed the position of acting mayor replacing his uncle, the late Canuto Oreta, after the latter died of lung cancer in September 2012, He became Mayor of Malabon. Later, he ran for the mayoralty race for his first official term and won the election unopposed. Oreta then went on to run for his second and third term during 2016 and 2019 elections, competing against then-Congresswoman Jaye Lacson-Noel and then Vice Mayor Jeannie Sandoval in those respective elections.

During his tenure, Oreta implemented various social and local development programs. In 2015, the city government launched initiatives aimed at addressing child malnutrition through community-based nutrition interventions. He also promoted local tourism and economic activity by supporting projects such as organized tricycle tours highlighting Malabon’s narrow streets, heritage sites, and local cuisine. His administration likewise focused on strengthening public health services, education, and social welfare programs, including efforts to reduce poverty and improve healthcare access in the city.

In 2020, Oreta ordered an investigation into alleged anomalies at the City of Malabon University (CMU), including reported irregularities in enrollment records. Subsequent complaints related to university operations were later filed by private individuals. In 2022, a former CMU officer-in-charge stated that the university had complied with documentary requirements related to its status under the Commission on Higher Education’s UniFAST program.

In October 2021, Oreta announced that he would not seek any position in the 2022 elections.

=== Post-Mayor ===
In March 2025, a tricycle driver, Romeo Dimaunahan, filed a complaint against Oreta alleging graft and corruption in connection with the incomplete distribution of electric tricycles for a drivers’ association, with 42 units reportedly valued at ₱22.4 million unaccounted for during his local administration. Oreta’s camp described the complaint as part of a larger smear campaign and a series of corruption-related accusations filed during the 2025 election period.

=== House of Representatives (since 2025) ===
In 2024, he ran for Representative of Malabon House of Representative under the National Unity Party. On May 13, 2025, Oreta won as members of House of Representatives of the Philippines.

On October 21, 2025, a resident, Tomas Santos Cruz, filed a complaint against Oreta and Helen Edith Lee Tan, president of International Builders Corporation, alleging irregularities in the rehabilitation of the Tugatog Cemetery and possible violations of anti-graft laws. Oreta and his camp denied the allegations, describing them as politically motivated and part of a smear campaign during the election period. A separate fact-check report by The Philippine Star earlier clarified that the Tugatog Cemetery remains public property owned by the Malabon city government and was not sold to any private entity, contrary to circulating claims online.

As a legislator, Oreta advocated for clearer food labeling policies to address rising obesity among Filipinos. He filed House Bill No. 6147, or the proposed “Healthy Food Environment Act,” which seeks to introduce front-of-pack nutrition labels to help consumers make informed food choices.

As of 2025, Oreta has authored and co-authored multiple bills in the House of Representatives. Among these is a measure seeking to strengthen mental health services in state universities and colleges.

As a member of the House of Representatives, Oreta serves in several committees, including Appropriations, Civil Service and Professional Regulation, Constitutional Amendments, Disaster Resilience, Housing and Urban Development, Metro Manila Development, Public Works and Highways, Suffrage and Electoral Reforms, Ways and Means, and Welfare of Children. He also serves as vice chairperson of the Committees on Cooperatives Development, Higher and Technical Education, and Youth and Sports Development, and chairperson of the Committee on West Philippine Sea.

== Personal life ==
Oreta is married to Melissa Grace Sison, a recognized chef by profession whom he met at the Salumeria restaurant in Makati in the early 1990s. Their wedding ceremony was held on May 30, 2014, at the San Bartolome Church in Malabon.

== Electoral history ==
Electoral history of Antolin Oreta III
Year	Office	Party	Votes received				Result
Year	Office	Party	Total	%	P.	Swing	Result
2007	Councilor (Malabon–1st)	LDP	36,329	—N/a	1st	—N/a	Won
2010	Vice Mayor of Malabon	Liberal	80,834	68.91%	1st	—N/a	Won
2013	Mayor of Malabon	Liberal	69,555	100.00%	1st	—N/a	Unopposed
2016	Mayor of Malabon	Liberal	78,899	54.40%	1st	-45.6	Won
2019	Mayor of Malabon	Liberal	100,795	64.22%	1st	+9.82	Won
2025	Representative (Malabon–at–large)	NUP	84,940	45.71%	1st	—N/a	Won

== Notes ==
House of Representatives of the Philippines
Preceded by Josephine Lacson-Noel	Member of the House of Representatives from Malabon's at-large district 2025–present	Incumbent
Political offices
Preceded by Tito Oreta	Mayor of Malabon; 2012–2022	Succeeded by Jeannie Sandoval
Preceded by Arnold Vicencio	Vice Mayor of Malabon; 2010–2012	Succeeded by Diosdado Cunanan
