= Josephine Lacson-Noel =

Filipino politician

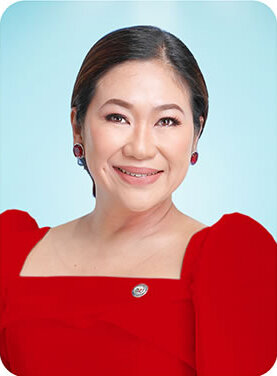
- Official portrait, 2022

Member of the Philippine House of Representatives
- In office June 30, 2019 – June 30, 2025
- Preceded by: Ricky Sandoval
- Succeeded by: Antolin Oreta III
- Constituency: Malabon
- In office June 30, 2010 – June 30, 2016
- Preceded by: Constituency established
- Succeeded by: Ricky Sandoval
- Constituency: Malabon
- In office November 17, 2009 – June 30, 2010
- Preceded by: Alvin Sandoval
- Succeeded by: Constituency dissolved
- Constituency: Malabon–Navotas

Personal details
- Born: Josephine Veronique Resurrecion Lacson; 19 March 1967 (age 59)
- Party: NPC (2006–present)
- Spouse: Bem Noel
- Children: 3

Josephine "Jaye" Veronique Resurrecion Lacson-Noel (born 19 March 1967) is a Filipino politician she was serves as members of the House of Representatives of Malabon–Navotas from 2009 to 2010 and the lone district of Malabon from 2010 to 2016 and from 2019 to 2025.

== Personal life ==
Lacson is married to Bem Noel, who is a former member of the House of Representatives representing An Waray, with thom they have three children. Their son Regino Federico "Nino" Noel was a city councilor of Malabon.
