= Ricky Sandoval =

Filipino Politician

Federico "Ricky" Sandoval II

Member of the Philippine House of Representatives
- In office June 30, 2016 – June 30, 2019
- Preceded by: Josephine Lacson-Noel
- Succeeded by: Josephine Lacson-Noel
- Constituency: Malabon
- In office June 30, 1998 – June 30, 2007
- Preceded by: Tessie Aquino-Oreta
- Succeeded by: Alvin Sandoval
- Constituency: Malabon–Navotas

Personal details
- Born: Federico Soteco Sandoval II; 4 May 1963 (age 63)
- Party: Lakas–CMD (2024-present, 1998-2015)
- Other political affiliations: NPC (2015-2016); PDP–Laban (2016-2024); Liberal (2001-2007)
- Spouse: Jeannie Ng
- Children: 1
- Occupation: Politician

Federico "Ricky" Soteco Sandoval II (born 4 May 1963) is a Filipino politician and was a former representative of Malabon–Navotas from 1998 to 2007 and the lone district of Malabon from 2016 to 2019.

== Early life and education ==
Federico "Ricky" Soteco Sandoval II was born on 4 May 1963, He is the eldest of five children of Vicente "Brown" Sandoval, Congressman of the First District of Palawan and his wife Fidela Soteco.

He studied elementary at the Philippine Malabon Cultural Institute and transfer to Saint Jude Catholic School in Manila until high school. and later went abroad to earn an engineering degree in naval architecture at the State University of New York in 1985. He finished bachelor's degree in Public Administration at Polytechnic University of the Philippines in 1996.

== Career ==
=== Professional career ===
He was engaged in business enterprises like the Sandoval Shipyards, Inc. and Delsan Transport Lines, Inc. He also became Commander of the 201st Squadron of the Philippine Auxiliary Coast Guard and served as Rear Commodore of the Manila Yacht Club.

=== Political career ===
In his first venture into public office, he was elected Congressman in the 1998 elections, besting old political hands in Malabon and Navotas. By becoming a member of the House, he and his father were the first ever father and son tandem to serve in Congress concurrently—his father won his first reelection bid.

During his first term of office, Sandoval engaged in opposition against illegal gambling, which not only includes clandestine local operations of jueteng, but also government authorized national ventures like jai-alai and On-Line Bingo.

Sandoval has been instrumental in providing public works projects in his district like the creation of road dikes and drainage facilities, and the dredging of the Malabon and Navotas waterways to counter the perennial problem of floods. He also directed funds towards the improvement of roads and the construction and rehabilitation of school buildings for his constituents. He initiated various projects for the advancement of health and education and established a scholarship fund for poor but deserving children in Malabon and Navotas.

Perhaps one of the greatest achievements of his congressional career was his successful effort to convert Malabon into a highly urbanized city with the passage of Republic Act 9019, the Charter of the City of Malabon, ratified on 22 April 2001 in the successful plebiscite among the people of Malabon.

In 2007, after being term-limited for being representative for Malabon–Navotas district, he ran for Mayor of Navotas under the Liberal Party but lost to Toby Tiangco. He ran again this time in 2016 for Representative of the lone district of Malabon and he was successful this time, beating Tessie Aquino-Oreta in a close margin.

== Personal life ==
He is married to Jeannie Ng, who is the former vice mayor and currently mayor of Malabon since 2022. They have one son.
