= List of members of the House of Representatives of the Philippines (Z) =

This is a complete list of past and present members of the House of Representatives of the Philippines whose last names begin with the letter Z.

This list also includes members of the Philippine Assembly (1907–1916), the Commonwealth National Assembly (1935–1941), the Second Republic National Assembly (1943–1944) and the Batasang Pambansa (1978–1986).

== List of representatives ==
| Representative | Years | Legislature | Constituency | Party | Notes |
|---|---|---|---|---|---|
| Jose Zafra | 1966–1969 | 6th Congress | Bohol–2nd | Nacionalista | |
| Calixto Zaldivar | 1934–1935 | 10th Legislature | Antique at-large | Nacionalista Democrata Pro-Independencia (until 1938) | |
| Calixto Zaldivar | 1935–1941 | 1st–2nd National Assembly | Antique at-large | Nacionalista Democrata Pro-Independencia (until 1938) | |
| Calixto Zaldivar | 1935–1941 | 1st–2nd National Assembly | Antique at-large | Nacionalista (from 1938) | |
| Enrique Zaldívar | 1969–1973 | 7th Congress | Antique at-large | Liberal | |
| Bel Zamora | 2022–present | 19th–20th Congress | San Juan at-large | PDP–Laban (until 2024) | |
| Bel Zamora | 2022–present | 19th–20th Congress | San Juan at-large | Lakas (from 2024) | |
| Juan Zamora | 1943–1944 | National Assembly (Second Republic) | Cebu City | KALIBAPI | |
| Manuel E. Zamora | 2001–2010 | 12th–14th Congress | Compostella Valley–1st | Lakas | |
| Manuel E. Zamora | 2019–2022 | 18th Congress | Davao de Oro–1st | HNP | |
| Maricar Zamora | 2010–2019 | 15th–17th Congress | Compostella Valley–1st | Liberal (until 2018) | |
| Maricar Zamora | 2010–2019 | 15th–17th Congress | Compostella Valley–1st | HNP (from 2018) | |
| Maricar Zamora | 2022–present | 19th–20th Congress | Davao de Oro–1st | Lakas (HNP) (until 2024) | |
| Maricar Zamora | 2022–present | 19th–20th Congress | Davao de Oro–1st | Lakas (from 2024) | |
| Pammy Zamora | 2022–2025 | 19th Congress | Taguig–Pateros–2nd | Nacionalista (until 2024) | |
| Pammy Zamora | 2022–2025 | 19th Congress | Taguig–Pateros–2nd | Lakas (from 2024) | |
| Ronaldo Zamora | 1978–1984 | Interim Batasang Pambansa | Region IV | KBL | |
| Ronaldo Zamora | 1987–1995 | 8th–9th Congress | San Juan–Mandaluyong at-large | Independent (until 1992) | |
| Ronaldo Zamora | 1987–1995 | 8th–9th Congress | San Juan–Mandaluyong at-large | LDP (from 1992) | |
| Ronaldo Zamora | 1995–1998; 2001–2010; 2013–2022 | 10th, 12th–14th, 16th–18th Congress | San Juan at-large | NPC (until 1998) | |
| Ronaldo Zamora | 1995–1998; 2001–2010; 2013–2022 | 10th, 12th–14th, 16th–18th Congress | San Juan at-large | PMP (2001–2007) | |
| Ronaldo Zamora | 1995–1998; 2001–2010; 2013–2022 | 10th, 12th–14th, 16th–18th Congress | San Juan at-large | Nacionalista (2007–2010) | |
| Ronaldo Zamora | 1995–1998; 2001–2010; 2013–2022 | 10th, 12th–14th, 16th–18th Congress | San Juan at-large | UNA (2013–2015) | |
| Ronaldo Zamora | 1995–1998; 2001–2010; 2013–2022 | 10th, 12th–14th, 16th–18th Congress | San Juan at-large | Nacionalista (2015–2016) | |
| Ronaldo Zamora | 1995–1998; 2001–2010; 2013–2022 | 10th, 12th–14th, 16th–18th Congress | San Juan at-large | PDP–Laban (from 2016) | |
| Francisco Zandueta | 1907–1909 | 1st Legislature | La Union–2nd | Progresista | |
| Jeremias Zapata | 1978–1984 | Interim Batasang Pambansa | Region I | KBL | |
| Jeremias Zapata | 1992–1998 | 9th–10th Congress | Abra at-large | Lakas | |
| Carlos Isagani Zarate | 2013–2022 | 16th–18th Congress | Party-list | Bayan Muna | |
| Isidro Zarraga | 1987–1995 | 8th–10th Congress | Bohol–3rd | LnB (until 1988) | |
| Isidro Zarraga | 1987–1995 | 8th–10th Congress | Bohol–3rd | LDP (1988–1992) | |
| Isidro Zarraga | 1987–1995 | 8th–10th Congress | Bohol–3rd | Lakas (from 1992) | |
| Ariel Zartiga | 1992–1998 | 9th–10th Congress | Sectoral (Urban poor) | Nonpartisan | |
| Ariel Zartiga | 1998–2001 | 11th Congress | Party-list | AKO | |
| Jose Zenarosa | 1922–1925 | 6th Legislature | Camarines Norte at-large | Nacionalista Colectivista | |
| Trinidad Zenarosa | 1943–1944 | National Assembly (Second Republic) | Camarines Norte | KALIBAPI | |
| Eduardo Zialcita | 2001–2004 | 12th Congress | Parañaque at-large | Lakas (until 2009) | |
| Eduardo Zialcita | 2004–2010 | 14th–15th Congress | Parañaque–1st | Lakas (until 2009) | |
| Eduardo Zialcita | 2004–2010 | 14th–15th Congress | Parañaque–1st | Nacionalista (from 2009) | |
| Francisco Zialcita | 1909–1912 | 2nd Legislature | Leyte–2nd | Liga Popular | |
| Lorenzo Ziga | 1949–1954 | 2nd–3rd Congress | Albay–1st | Liberal | Died on November 4, 1954. |
| Tecla San Andres Ziga | 1955–1961 | 3rd–4th Congress | Albay–1st | Liberal | Elected on November 8, 1955 to finish Lorenzo Ziga's term. |
| Venancio Ziga | 1961–1969 | 5th–6th Congress | Albay–1st | Liberal | |
| Victor Ziga | 1984–1986 | Regular Batasang Pambansa | Albay | UNIDO | |
| Marcelo Zorilla | 1943–1944 | National Assembly (Second Republic) | Laguna | KALIBAPI | |
| Manuel Zosa | 1947–1953; 1956–1965; 1969–1973 | 1st–2nd, 3rd–5th, 7th Congress | Cebu–6th | Nacionalista (until 1965) | Elected in 1947 to finish Nicolas Rafols's term. Assumed office for a second term in 1956 after the election of Santiago Lucero was annulled by the House Electoral Tribunal following an electoral protest. |
| Manuel Zosa | 1947–1953; 1956–1965; 1969–1973 | 1st–2nd, 3rd–5th, 7th Congress | Cebu–6th | Liberal (from 1969) | Elected in 1947 to finish Nicolas Rafols's term. Assumed office for a second term in 1956 after the election of Santiago Lucero was annulled by the House Electoral Tribunal following an electoral protest. |
| Audrey Zubiri | 2025–present | 20th Congress | Bukidnon–3rd | PFP | |
| Jose Maria Zubiri Jr. | 1984–1986 | Regular Batasang Pambansa | Bukidnon | KBL | |
| Jose Maria Zubiri Jr. | 1987–1998; 2022–2025 | 8th–10th, 19th Congress | Bukidnon–3rd | Liberal (until 1992) | |
| Jose Maria Zubiri Jr. | 1987–1998; 2022–2025 | 8th–10th, 19th Congress | Bukidnon–3rd | NPC (1992–1995) | |
| Jose Maria Zubiri Jr. | 1987–1998; 2022–2025 | 8th–10th, 19th Congress | Bukidnon–3rd | Lakas (1995–1998) | |
| Jose Maria Zubiri Jr. | 1987–1998; 2022–2025 | 8th–10th, 19th Congress | Bukidnon–3rd | BPP (local; from 2022) | |
| Jose Maria Zubiri Jr. | 1987–1998; 2022–2025 | 8th–10th, 19th Congress | Bukidnon–3rd | PFP (from 2024) | |
| Jose Zubiri III | 2007–2016 | 14th–16th Congress | Bukidnon–3rd | Lakas (until 2012) | |
| Jose Zubiri III | 2007–2016 | 14th–16th Congress | Bukidnon–3rd | Liberal (from 2012) | |
| Manuel Zubiri | 2016–2022 | 17th–18th Congress | Bukidnon–3rd | BPP | |
| Jose Zulueta | 1928–1935 | 8th–10th Legislature | Iloilo–1st | Nacionalista (until 1934) | Resigned from seventh term in 1946 upon appointment as Secretary of the Interior. Resigned from eighth term in 1952 upon election as senator. |
| Jose Zulueta | 1928–1935 | 8th–10th Legislature | Iloilo–1st | Nacionalista Democratico (1934–1938) | Resigned from seventh term in 1946 upon appointment as Secretary of the Interior. Resigned from eighth term in 1952 upon election as senator. |
| Jose Zulueta | 1935–1941 | 1st–2nd National Assembly | Iloilo–1st | Nacionalista Democratico (1934–1938) | Resigned from seventh term in 1946 upon appointment as Secretary of the Interior. Resigned from eighth term in 1952 upon election as senator. |
| Jose Zulueta | 1935–1941 | 1st–2nd National Assembly | Iloilo–1st | Nacionalista (1938–1941; 1945–1946) | Resigned from seventh term in 1946 upon appointment as Secretary of the Interior. Resigned from eighth term in 1952 upon election as senator. |
| Jose Zulueta | 1945–1946 | 1st Commonwealth Congress | Iloilo–1st | Nacionalista (1938–1941; 1945–1946) | Resigned from seventh term in 1946 upon appointment as Secretary of the Interior. Resigned from eighth term in 1952 upon election as senator. |
| Jose Zulueta | 1946; 1949–1952; 1969–1973 | 1st, 2nd, 7th Congress | Iloilo–1st | Liberal (1946; 1949–1951) | Resigned from seventh term in 1946 upon appointment as Secretary of the Interior. Resigned from eighth term in 1952 upon election as senator. |
| Jose Zulueta | 1946; 1949–1952; 1969–1973 | 1st, 2nd, 7th Congress | Iloilo–1st | Nacionalista (1951–1952; from 1969) | Resigned from seventh term in 1946 upon appointment as Secretary of the Interior. Resigned from eighth term in 1952 upon election as senator. |
| Francisco Zulueta | 1943–1944 | National Assembly (Second Republic) | Bacolod | KALIBAPI | |
| Jose Zurbito | 1909–1916 | 2nd–3rd Legislature | Bohol–2nd | Nacionalista | |
