= 2022 Philippine House of Representatives elections in Metro Manila =

- May 9, 2022
- All 33 Metro Manila seats in the House of Representatives
Party	Seats	+/–
PDP–Laban	7	−4
NUP	6	+6
Nacionalista	4	+1
NPC	4	−2
Liberal	3	−1
Asenso	3	+1
Lakas	1	+1
Navoteño	1	0
UNA	1	+1
Independent	3	+3
This lists parties that won seats. See the complete results below.

The 2022 Philippine House of Representatives elections in Metro Manila were held on May 9, 2022, to elect the thirty-three representatives to the House of Representatives of the Philippines representing various areas in the National Capital Region. The elections coincided with the presidential election, the senatorial election, and the local elections. The representatives were elected via first past the post, in which the candidate with the most votes will be elected as representative for that district.

Caloocan's 3rd congressional district was contested for the first time in this election.

== Summary ==
Congressional district	Incumbent	Incumbent's party	Winner	Winner's party	Winning margin
Caloocan–1st	Along Malapitan	PDP–Laban	Oscar Malapitan	Nacionalista	50.13%
Caloocan–2nd	Edgar Erice	Aksyon	Mitch Cajayon-Uy	PDP–Laban	12.50%
Caloocan–3rd	New seat		Dean Asistio	PDP–Laban	11.58%
Las Piñas	Camille Villar	Nacionalista	Camille Villar	Nacionalista	30.29%
Makati–1st	Kid Peña	Liberal	Kid Peña	Liberal	91.75%
Makati–2nd	Luis Campos	NPC	Luis Campos	NPC	83.50%
Malabon	Josephine Lacson-Noel	NPC	Josephine Lacson-Noel	NPC	12.18%
Mandaluyong	Neptali Gonzales II	NUP	Neptali Gonzales II	NUP	56.36%
Manila–1st	Manny Lopez	PDP–Laban	Ernix Dionisio	Asenso Manileño	6.74%
Manila–2nd	Rolando Valeriano	NUP	Rolando Valeriano	NUP	24.22%
Manila–3rd	Yul Servo	Asenso Manileño	Joel Chua	Asenso Manileño	37.28%
Manila–4th	Edward Maceda	NPC	Edward Maceda	NPC	52.25%
Manila–5th	Cristal Bagatsing	NUP	Irwin Tieng	Asenso Manileño	1.98%
Manila–6th	Benny Abante	NUP	Benny Abante	NUP	60.89%
Marikina–1st	Bayani Fernando	NPC	Maan Teodoro	UNA	47.22%
Marikina–2nd	Stella Quimbo	Liberal	Stella Quimbo	Liberal	66.12%
Muntinlupa	Ruffy Biazon	One Muntinlupa	Jaime Fresnedi	Liberal	55.42%
Navotas	John Rey Tiangco	Partido Navoteño	Toby Tiangco	Partido Navoteño	25.70%
Parañaque–1st	Eric Olivarez	PDP–Laban	Edwin Olivarez	PDP–Laban	84.56%
Parañaque–2nd	Joy Myra Tambunting	NUP	Gustavo Tambunting	NUP	5.78%
Pasay	Antonino Calixto	PDP–Laban	Antonino Calixto	PDP–Laban	70.54%
Pasig	Roman Romulo	Independent	Roman Romulo	Independent	68.88%
Quezon City–1st	Onyx Crisologo	Lakas	Arjo Atayde	Independent	35.40%
Quezon City–2nd	Precious Hipolito	Lakas	Ralph Tulfo	Independent	12.97%
Quezon City–3rd	Allan Benedict Reyes	NPC	Franz Pumaren	NUP	3.27%
Quezon City–4th	Bong Suntay	PDP–Laban	Marvin Rillo	Lakas	1.18%
Quezon City–5th	Alfred Vargas	PDP–Laban	PM Vargas	PDP–Laban	15.16%
Quezon City–6th	Kit Belmonte	Liberal	Marivic Co-Pilar	NUP	26.30%
San Juan	Ronaldo Zamora	PDP–Laban	Bel Zamora	PDP–Laban	29.04%
Taguig 1st–Pateros	Alan Peter Cayetano	Independent	Ading Cruz	Nacionalista	9.02%
Taguig 2nd	Lani Cayetano	Nacionalista	Pammy Zamora	Nacionalista	37.50%
Valenzuela–1st	Wes Gatchalian	NPC	Rex Gatchalian	NPC	Unopposed
Valenzuela–2nd	Eric Martinez	PDP–Laban	Eric Martinez	PDP–Laban	44.66%

== Caloocan ==
=== 1st district ===
As a result of Caloocan being redistricted in 2021, the district was reduced to Barangays 1 to 4, 77 to 85 and 132 to 177.

Incumbent Along Malapitan of the PDP–Laban ran for mayor of Caloocan.

Malapitan endorsed his father, Caloocan mayor Oscar Malapitan (Nacionalista Party), who won the election against city councilor Alou Nubla (Aksyon Demokratiko) and Violeta dela Cruz (Independent).

Candidate	Party	Votes	%
Oscar Malapitan	Nacionalista Party	195,705	74.27
Alou Nubla	Aksyon Demokratiko	63,604	24.14
Violeta dela Cruz	Independent	4,207	1.60
Total		263,516	100.00
Total votes		285,861	–
Registered voters/turnout		342,766	83.40
Nacionalista gain from PDP–Laban			
Source: Commission on Elections

=== 2nd district ===
Term-limited Edgar Erice of Aksyon Demokratiko ran for mayor of Caloocan. He was previously affiliated with the Liberal Party.

Aksyon Demokratiko nominated Jacob Cabochan, who was defeated by former representative Mitch Cajayon-Uy of PDP–Laban. City councilor Roberto Samson (Lakas–CMD), Caloocan vice mayor Maca Asistio (Nationalist People's Coalition) and city councilor Alex Mangasar (Partido para sa Demokratikong Reporma) also ran for representative.

Candidate	Party	Votes	%
Mitch Cajayon-Uy	PDP–Laban	63,669	35.20
Roberto Samson	Lakas–CMD	41,057	22.70
Maca Asistio	Nationalist People's Coalition	28,603	15.81
Alex Mangasar	Partido para sa Demokratikong Reporma	26,870	14.86
Jacob Cabochan	Aksyon Demokratiko	20,672	11.43
Total		180,871	100.00
Total votes		190,967	–
Registered voters/turnout		233,294	81.86
PDP–Laban gain from Aksyon			
Source: Commission on Elections

=== 3rd district ===
As a result of Caloocan being redistricted in 2021, the district was created with Barangays 178–188, which used to be under Caloocan's 1st district.

City councilor Dean Asistio (PDP–Laban) won the election against former Caloocan mayor Recom Echiverri (Pederalismo ng Dugong Dakilang Samahan).

Candidate	Party	Votes	%
Dean Asistio	PDP–Laban	54,319	55.79
Recom Echiverri	Pederalismo ng Dugong Dakilang Samahan	43,044	44.21
Total		97,363	100.00
Total votes		105,693	–
Registered voters/turnout		124,219	85.09
PDP–Laban gain			
Source: Commission on Elections

== Las Piñas ==
Incumbent Camille Villar of the Nacionalista Party ran for a second term.

Villar won re-election against two other candidates.

Candidate	Party	Votes	%
Camille Villar (incumbent)	Nacionalista Party	130,812	60.90
Louie Redoble	Ang Kapatiran	65,751	30.61
Felipe Garduque II	Independent	18,249	8.50
Total		214,812	100.00
Total votes		242,024	–
Registered voters/turnout		291,074	83.15
Nacionalista hold			
Source: Commission on Elections

== Makati ==
=== 1st district ===
Incumbent Kid Peña of the Liberal Party ran for a second term.

Pena won re-election against two other candidates.

Candidate	Party	Votes	%
Kid Peña (incumbent)	Liberal Party	146,131	94.87
Minnie Antonio	Independent	4,801	3.12
Ferds Sevilla	Independent	3,104	2.02
Total		154,036	100.00
Total votes		171,281	–
Registered voters/turnout		209,859	81.62
Liberal hold			
Source: Commission on Elections

=== 2nd district ===
Incumbent Luis Campos of the Nationalist People's Coalition ran for a third term.

Campos won re-election against Ricardo Opoc (Independent).

Candidate	Party	Votes	%
Luis Campos (incumbent)	Nationalist People's Coalition	164,948	91.75
Ricardo Opoc	Independent	14,838	8.25
Total		179,786	100.00
Total votes		203,822	–
Registered voters/turnout		248,503	82.02
NPC hold			
Source: Commission on Elections

== Malabon ==
Incumbent Josephine Lacson-Noel of the Nationalist People's Coalition ran for a second term.

Lacson-Noel won re-election against former representative Ricky Sandoval (PDP–Laban).

Candidate	Party	Votes	%
Josephine Lacson-Noel (incumbent)	Nationalist People's Coalition	102,320	56.09
Ricky Sandoval	PDP–Laban	80,089	43.91
Total		182,409	100.00
Total votes		196,218	–
Registered voters/turnout		258,115	76.02
NPC hold			
Source: Commission on Elections

== Mandaluyong ==
Incumbent Neptali Gonzales II of the National Unity Party ran for a second term. He was previously affiliated with PDP–Laban.

Gonzales won re-election against Boyett Bacar (Aksyon Demokratiko).

Candidate	Party	Votes	%
Neptali Gonzales II (incumbent)	National Unity Party	132,558	78.18
Boyett Bacar	Aksyon Demokratiko	36,998	21.82
Total		169,556	100.00
Total votes		184,423	–
Registered voters/turnout		232,492	79.32
NUP hold			
Source: Commission on Elections

== Manila ==
=== 1st district ===
Incumbent Manny Lopez of PDP–Laban ran for a third term. He was previously affiliated with the Nationalist People's Coalition.

Lopez was defeated by city councilor Ernix Dionisio of Asenso Manileño. Former representative Atong Asilo (Liberal Party) also ran for representative.

Candidate	Party	Votes	%
Ernix Dionisio	Asenso Manileño	88,327	44.66
Manny Lopez (incumbent)	PDP–Laban	74,991	37.92
Atong Asilo	Liberal Party	34,441	17.42
Total		197,759	100.00
Total votes		208,103	–
Registered voters/turnout		264,362	78.72
Asenso Manileño gain from PDP–Laban			
Source: Commission on Elections

=== 2nd district ===
Incumbent Rolando Valeriano of National Unity Party ran for a second term. He was previously affiliated with Asenso Manileño.

Valeriano won re-election against former representative Carlo Lopez (Nacionalista Party).

Candidate	Party	Votes	%
Rolando Valeriano (incumbent)	National Unity Party	70,146	62.11
Carlo Lopez	Nacionalista Party	42,787	37.89
Total		112,933	100.00
Total votes		120,987	–
Registered voters/turnout		152,929	79.11
NUP hold			
Source: Commission on Elections

=== 3rd district ===
Incumbent Yul Servo of Asenso Manileño retired to run for vice mayor of Manila. He was previously affiliated with PDP–Laban.

Asenso Manileño nominated city councilor Joel Chua, who won the election against Barangay 299 chairman Ramon Morales (PDP–Laban) and Clark Field Arroño III (Independent).

Candidate	Party	Votes	%
Joel Chua	Asenso Manileño	68,946	67.78
Ramon Morales	PDP–Laban	31,030	30.50
Clark Field Arroño III	Independent	1,748	1.72
Total		101,724	100.00
Total votes		115,614	–
Registered voters/turnout		164,664	70.21
Asenso Manileño hold			
Source: Commission on Elections

=== 4th district ===
Incumbent Edward Maceda of the Nationalist People's Coalition ran for a third term. He was previously affiliated with Pwersa ng Masang Pilipino.

Maceda won re-election against former representative Trisha Bonoan-David (Independent) and Christopher Gabriel (People's Reform Party).

Candidate	Party	Votes	%
Edward Maceda (incumbent)	Nationalist People's Coalition	90,075	73.40
Trisha Bonoan-David	Independent	25,961	21.15
Christopher Gabriel	People's Reform Party	6,687	5.45
Total		122,723	100.00
Total votes		132,964	–
Registered voters/turnout		162,767	81.69
NPC hold			
Source: Commission on Elections

=== 5th district ===
Incumbent Cristal Bagatsing of the National Unity Party ran for a third term. She was previously affiliated with Kabalikat ng Bayan sa Kaunlaran.

Bagatsing was defeated by city councilor Irwin Tieng of Asenso Manileño.

Candidate	Party	Votes	%
Irwin Tieng	Asenso Manileño	83,286	50.99
Cristal Bagatsing (incumbent)	National Unity Party	80,045	49.01
Total		163,331	100.00
Total votes		175,386	–
Registered voters/turnout		217,787	80.53
Asenso Manileño gain from NUP			
Source: Commission on Elections

=== 6th district ===
Incumbent Benny Abante of the National Unity Party ran for a second term. He was previously affiliated with Asenso Manileño.

Abante won re-election against two other candidates.

Candidate	Party	Votes	%
Benny Abante (incumbent)	National Unity Party	95,431	79.37
Romualdo Billanes	People's Reform Party	22,221	18.48
Antonio Sityar II	Independent	2,582	2.15
Total		120,234	100.00
Total votes		133,079	–
Registered voters/turnout		170,533	78.04
NUP hold			
Source: Commission on Elections

== Marikina ==
=== 1st district ===
Incumbent Bayani Fernando of the Nationalist People's Coalition (NPC) retired to run for mayor of Marikina.

The NPC initially nominated former Marikina vice mayor Jose Fabian Cadiz, but he died on February 20, 2022. Cadiz was substituted by his nephew, Jose Miguel Cadiz, who was defeated by Maan Teodoro, the wife of Mayor Marcelino Teodoro.

Candidate	Party	Votes	%
Maan Teodoro	United Nationalist Alliance	68,572	73.61
Jose Miguel Cadiz	Nationalist People's Coalition	24,584	26.39
Total		93,156	100.00
Total votes		99,474	–
Registered voters/turnout		114,298	87.03
UNA gain from NPC			
Source: Commission on Elections

=== 2nd district ===
Incumbent Stella Quimbo of the Liberal Party ran for a second term.

Quimbo won re-election against former Marikina mayor Del de Guzman (Aksyon Demokratiko) and Mauro Arce (Kilusang Bagong Lipunan).

Candidate	Party	Votes	%
Stella Quimbo (incumbent)	Liberal Party	103,108	82.70
Del de Guzman	Aksyon Demokratiko	20,674	16.58
Mauro Arce	Kilusang Bagong Lipunan	894	0.72
Total		124,676	100.00
Total votes		129,793	–
Registered voters/turnout		146,451	88.63
Liberal hold			
Source: Commission on Elections

== Muntinlupa ==
Incumbent Ruffy Biazon of One Muntinlupa retired to run for mayor of Muntinlupa. He was previously affiliated with PDP–Laban.

Biazon endorsed Muntinlupa mayor Jaime Fresnedi (Liberal Party), who won the election against Silverio Garing (PDP–Laban).

Candidate	Party	Votes	%
Jaime Fresnedi	Liberal Party	183,085	77.71
Silverio Garing	PDP–Laban	52,530	22.29
Total		235,615	100.00
Total votes		252,396	–
Registered voters/turnout		311,750	80.96
Liberal gain from One Muntinlupa			
Source: Commission on Elections

== Navotas ==
Incumbent John Rey Tiangco of the Partido Navoteño retired to run for mayor of Navotas.

The Partido Navoteño nominated Navotas mayor Toby Tiangco, who won the election against Gardy Cruz (Aksyon Demokratiko).

Candidate	Party	Votes	%
Toby Tiangco	Partido Navoteño	79,505	62.85
Gardy Cruz	Aksyon Demokratiko	46,991	37.15
Total		126,496	100.00
Total votes		129,907	–
Registered voters/turnout		150,693	86.21
Navoteño hold			
Source: Commission on Elections

== Parañaque ==
=== 1st district ===
Term-limited incumbent Eric Olivarez of PDP–Laban ran for mayor of Parañaque.

PDP–Laban nominated Parañaque mayor Edwin Olivarez, who won the election against two other candidates.

Candidate	Party	Votes	%
Edwin Olivarez	PDP–Laban	91,241	90.16
Jayson Moral	Aksyon Demokratiko	5,662	5.60
Pete Montaño	Independent	4,292	4.24
Total		101,195	100.00
Total votes		113,537	–
Registered voters/turnout		142,815	79.50
PDP–Laban hold			
Source: Commission on Elections

=== 2nd district ===
Incumbent Joy Myra Tambunting of the National Unity Party (NUP) retired. She was previously affiliated with PDP–Laban.

The NUP nominated former representative Gustavo Tambunting, who won the election against Josef Maganduga (Samahang Kaagapay ng Agilang Pilipino).

Candidate	Party	Votes	%
Gustavo Tambunting	National Unity Party	82,357	52.89
Josef Maganduga	Samahang Kaagapay ng Agilang Pilipino	73,346	47.11
Total		155,703	100.00
Total votes		171,901	–
Registered voters/turnout		203,263	84.57
NUP hold			
Source: Commission on Elections

== Pasay ==
Incumbent Antonino Calixto of PDP–Laban ran for a second term.

Calixto won re-election against three other candidates.

Candidate	Party	Votes	%
Tony Calixto (incumbent)	PDP–Laban	154,422	78.09
Choy Alas	Reform Party	19,106	9.66
Ramon Yabut	Independent	14,926	7.55
Jocelyn Sato	Partido para sa Demokratikong Reporma	9,285	4.70
Total		197,739	100.00
Total votes		221,411	–
Registered voters/turnout		276,579	80.05
PDP–Laban hold			
Source: Commission on Elections

== Pasig ==
Incumbent Roman Romulo ran for a second term as an independent. He was previously affiliated with Aksyon Demokratiko.

Romulo won re-election against former representative Ricky Eusebio (Nacionalista Party) and Rex Maliuanag (Independent).

Candidate	Party	Votes	%
Roman Romulo (incumbent)	Independent	304,157	83.89
Ricky Eusebio	Nacionalista Party	54,431	15.01
Rex Maliuanag	Independent	3,977	1.10
Total		362,565	100.00
Total votes		389,419	–
Registered voters/turnout		457,370	85.14
Independent hold			
Source: Commission on Elections

== Quezon City ==
=== 1st district ===
Incumbent Onyx Crisologo of Lakas–CMD ran for a second term. He was previously affiliated with PDP–Laban.

Crisologo was defeated by actor Arjo Atayde, an independent. Marcus Aurelius Dee (Independent) also ran for representative.

Candidate	Party	Votes	%
Arjo Atayde	Independent	112,457	66.85
Onyx Crisologo (incumbent)	Lakas–CMD	52,910	31.45
Marcus Aurelius Dee	Independent	2,857	1.70
Total		168,224	100.00
Total votes		174,235	–
Registered voters/turnout		224,351	77.66
Independent gain from Lakas–CMD			
Source: Commission on Elections

=== 2nd district ===
Incumbent Precious Hipolito of Lakas ran for a second term. She was previously affiliated with the Nationalist People's Coalition.

Hipolito was defeated by Ralph Tulfo of Lakas–CMD, son of broadcaster and senatorial candidate Raffy Tulfo. Four other candidates also ran for representative.

Candidate	Party	Votes	%
Ralph Tulfo	Independent	127,238	53.81
Precious Hipolito (incumbent)	Lakas–CMD	96,565	40.84
Virgil Garcia	Independent	6,231	2.63
Dads Calonge	Independent	3,533	1.49
Henric David	Independent	1,806	0.76
Raul Gador	Independent	1,103	0.47
Total		236,476	100.00
Total votes		255,263	–
Registered voters/turnout		309,300	82.53
Independent gain from Lakas			
Source: Commission on Elections

=== 3rd district ===
Incumbent Allan Benedict Reyes of the Nationalist People's Coalition ran for a second term. He was previously affiliated with the Partido Federal ng Pilipinas.

Reyes was defeated by city councilor Franz Pumaren of the National Unity Party. Jessie Dignadice (Independent) also ran for representative.

Candidate	Party	Votes	%
Franz Pumaren	National Unity Party	64,177	50.68
Allan Benedict Reyes (incumbent)	Nationalist People's Coalition	60,038	47.41
Jessie Dignadice	Independent	2,419	1.91
Total		126,634	100.00
Total votes		135,482	–
Registered voters/turnout		161,366	83.96
NUP gain from NPC			
Source: Commission on Elections

=== 4th district ===
Incumbent Bong Suntay of PDP–Laban ran for a second term.

Suntay was defeated by former city councilor Marvin Rillo of Lakas–CMD.

Candidate	Party	Votes	%
Marvin Rillo	Lakas–CMD	83,517	50.59
Bong Suntay (incumbent)	PDP–Laban	81,569	49.41
Total		165,086	100.00
Total votes		176,961	–
Registered voters/turnout		210,720	83.98
Lakas gain from PDP–Laban			
Source: Commission on Elections

=== 5th district ===
Term-limited incumbent Alfred Vargas of PDP–Laban ran for the Quezon City Council in the 5th councilor district.

PDP–Laban nominated city councilor Patrick Michael Vargas, who won the election against Rose Lin (Lakas–CMD), former Quezon City's 2nd district representative Annie Susano (Partido Federal ng Pilipinas) and four other candidates. Despite being affiliated with Lakas–CMD in the ballot, Rose Lin resigned from the party on November 19, 2021.

Candidate	Party	Votes	%
Patrick Michael Vargas	PDP–Laban	104,869	50.69
Rose Lin	Lakas–CMD	73,508	35.53
Annie Susano	Partido Federal ng Pilipinas	14,760	7.13
Inday Esplana	Independent	8,557	4.14
Antonio Ortega	Independent	2,803	1.35
Rose Sanchez	Independent	1,901	0.92
Jun Rustia	Independent	474	0.23
Total		206,872	100.00
Total votes		219,369	–
Registered voters/turnout		264,130	83.05
PDP–Laban hold			
Source: Commission on Elections

=== 6th district ===
Incumbent Kit Belmonte of the Liberal Party was term-limited.

Belmonte endorsed city councilor Marivic Co-Pilar (National Unity Party), who won the election against former Quezon City's 1st district representative Vincent Crisologo (Lakas–CMD) and Tricia Velasco-Catera (PDP–Laban).

Candidate	Party	Votes	%
Marivic Co-Pilar	National Unity Party	99,544	60.01
Vincent Crisologo	Lakas–CMD	55,919	33.71
Tricia Velasco-Catera	PDP–Laban	10,415	6.28
Total		165,878	100.00
Total votes		177,201	–
Registered voters/turnout		234,028	75.72
NUP gain from Liberal			
Source: Commission on Elections

== San Juan ==
Incumbent Ronaldo Zamora of PDP–Laban was term-limited.

PDP–Laban nominated Zamora's daughter, Bel Zamora, who won the election against former city councilor Jana Ejercito (Nationalist People's Coalition).

Candidate	Party	Votes	%
Bel Zamora	PDP–Laban	49,334	64.52
Jana Ejercito	Nationalist People's Coalition	27,133	35.48
Total		76,467	100.00
Total votes		81,104	–
Registered voters/turnout		109,640	73.97
PDP–Laban hold			
Source: Commission on Elections

== Taguig and Pateros ==
=== Taguig's 1st district and Pateros ===
Incumbent Alan Peter Cayetano of the Nacionalista Party ran for the Senate.

The Nacionalista Party nominated Taguig vice mayor Ading Cruz, who won the election against Allan Cerafica (Partido Pilipino sa Pagbabago).

Candidate	Party	Votes	%
Ading Cruz	Nacionalista Party	99,059	54.51
Allan Cerafica	Partido Pilipino sa Pagbabago	82,673	45.49
Total		181,732	100.00
Total votes		203,292	–
Nacionalista hold			
Source: Commission on Elections

=== Taguig's 2nd district ===
Incumbent Lani Cayetano of the Nacionalista Party ran for mayor of Taguig.

The Nacionalista Party nominated city councilor Pammy Zamora, who won the election against former city councilor Che Che Gonzales (Partido Pilipino sa Pagbabago).

Candidate	Party	Votes	%
Pammy Zamora	Nacionalista Party	121,179	68.75
Che Che Gonzales	Partido Pilipino sa Pagbabago	55,089	31.25
Total		176,268	100.00
Total votes		201,531	–
Nacionalista hold			
Source: Commission on Elections

== Valenzuela ==
=== 1st district ===
Incumbent Wes Gatchalian of the Nationalist People's Coalition (NPC) ran for mayor of Valenzuela.

The NPC nominated Gatchalian's brother, Valenzuela mayor Rex Gatchalian, who won the election unopposed.

Candidate	Party	Votes	%
Rex Gatchalian	Nationalist People's Coalition	141,794	100.00
Total		141,794	100.00
Total votes		170,741	–
Registered voters/turnout		199,294	85.67
NPC hold			
Source: Commission on Elections

=== 2nd district ===
Incumbent Eric Martinez of PDP–Laban ran for a third term.

Martinez won re-election against former representative Magi Gunigundo (Lingkod ng Mamamayan ng Valenzuela City).

Candidate	Party	Votes	%
Eric Martinez (incumbent)	PDP–Laban	132,241	72.33
Magi Gunigundo	Lingkod ng Mamamayan ng Valenzuela City	50,599	27.67
Total		182,840	100.00
Total votes		193,254	–
Registered voters/turnout		244,317	79.10
PDP–Laban hold			
Source: Commission on Elections
