= 1995 Philippine House of Representatives elections =

17th Philippine House of Representatives elections

- May 8, 1995
- 204 (of the 226) seats in the House of Representatives of the Philippines; 103 seats needed for a majority
| Party | Vote % | Seats | +/– |
|---|---|---|---|
| Lakas | 40.66 | 100 | +59 |
| NPC | 12.19 | 22 | −8 |
| LDP | 10.83 | 17 | −69 |
| LABAN | 10.40 | 25 | +25 |
| Others | 13.72 | 33 | +20 |
This lists parties that won seats. See the complete results below.
| Speaker before | Speaker after |
|---|---|
| Jose de Venecia Jr. Lakas | Jose de Venecia Jr. Lakas |

Elections for the House of Representatives of the Philippines were held on May 8, 1995. Being the first midterm election since 1938, the party of the incumbent president, Fidel V. Ramos's Lakas–NUCD–UMDP, won a plurality of the seats in the House of Representatives.

The elected representatives served in the 10th Congress from 1995 to 1998. Jose de Venecia, Jr. was easily reelected as the speaker of the House.

== Electoral system ==
The House of Representatives shall have not more than 250 members, unless otherwise fixed by law, of which 20% shall be elected via the party-list system, while the rest are elected via congressional districts. In lieu of an enabling law in regards to the party-list system, sectoral representatives shall continued to be appointed by the president just like previously in the Batasang Pambansa for the first three congresses from the enactment of the constitution, which includes this congress.

In this election, there are 204 seats voted via first-past-the-post in single-member districts. Each province, and a city with a population of 250,000, is guaranteed a seat, with more populous provinces and cities divided into two or more districts.

Congress has the power of redistricting three years after each census.

== Redistricting ==
Reapportioning (redistricting) the number of seats is either via national reapportionment three years after the release of every census, or via piecemeal redistricting for every province or city. National reapportionment has not happened since the 1987 constitution took effect, and aside from piecemeal redistricting, the apportionment was based on the ordinance from the constitution, which was in turn based from the 1980 census.

=== Changes from the previous Congresses ===
- Creation of Biliran and Guimaras provinces
  - The Local Government Code of 1991, enacted as Republic Act. No. 7160 mandates that all existing sub-provinces be made into provinces, having their own congressional representation.
  - Biliran, which was a sub-province of Leyte and included in its 3rd district, was then made into a province and became its own at-large district.
  - Guimaras, which was a sub-province of Iloilo and included in its 2nd district, was then made into a province and became its own at-large district.
  - Both approved in separate plebiscites on May 11, 1992.
- Creation of Sarangani province
  - The municipalities included in South Cotabato's 3rd district becomes the at-large district of the newly-created province of Sarangani
  - South Cotabato's 1st and 2nd districts were left intact.
  - Enacted into law as Republic Act. 7228.
  - Approved in a plebiscite on May 19, 1992.

=== Changes from the outgoing Congress ===
- Division of San Juan–Mandaluyong's at-large district to two districts
  - Mandaluyong attains cityhood and becomes its own at-large district.
  - San Juan becomes its own at-large district.
  - Enacted into law as Republic Act No. 7675.
  - Approved in a plebiscite on April 10, 1994.
- Reassignment of Benguet's two districts
  - Baguio (Benguet's 1st district) becomes its own at-large district.
  - Benguet (Benguet's 2nd district) becomes its own at-large district.
- Division of Makati's at-large district to two districts
  - Makati attains cityhood, and its western barangays becomes the 1st district.
  - The eastern barangays becomes the 2nd district.
  - Enacted into law as Republic Act No. 7854.
  - Approved in a plebiscite on February 4, 1995.

=== Summary of changes ===
As there were 218 seats from congressional districts, and since the constitution requires that there should be 1 party-list seat for every 4 seats from congressional districts, this means there were 53 party-list seats up for this election, or for a total of 270 seats.

| Category | Total |
|---|---|
| Congressional districts in the outgoing Congress | 200 |
| New districts from redistricting laws from previous congresses | 2 |
| New districts from redistricting laws from outgoing Congress | 2 |
| Total seats for the next Congress | 204 |

== Retiring incumbents ==
1. Agusan del Norte–2nd: Edelmiro Amante (Lakas)
2. Cagayan–1st: Juan Ponce Enrile (Independent), ran for senator
3. Cagayan–3rd: Francisco Mamba (Lakas)
4. Cebu–3rd: Pablo P. Garcia (Lakas), ran for governor of Cebu
5. Davao del Sur–1st: Alejandro Almendras (Lakas)
6. Ilocos Norte–2nd: Bongbong Marcos (KBL), ran for senator
7. Laguna–2nd: Rodolfo Tingzon (Lakas), ran for governor of Laguna
8. Lanao del Sur–2nd: Mohammad Ali Dimaporo (Lakas), ran for governor of Lanao del Sur
9. Masbate–3rd: Antonio Kho (Liberal), ran for governor of Masbate
10. Misamis Occidental–2nd: Hilarion Ramiro Jr. (Lakas)
11. Pangasinan–1st: Oscar Orbos (Lakas), ran for governor of Pangasinan
12. Pangasinan–6th: Conrado Estrella III (NPC)
13. Zambales–1st: Katherine Gordon (Nacionalista)

== Vacancies ==
1. Masbate–1st: Tito Espinosa (LDP) was assassinated on February 28, 1995.

== Results ==
The administration party, Lakas–NUCD–UMDP (Lakas), forged an electoral agreement with Laban ng Demokratikong Pilipino (LDP, then known as Laban) to create the Lakas–Laban Coalition. Candidates from the Liberal Party and PDP–Laban also joined the administration coalition. On the other hand, Nationalist People's Coalition (NPC) led the opposition coalition that also composed of candidates from Kilusang Bagong Lipunan (KBL), People's Reform Party (PRP) and Partido ng Masang Pilipino (PMP).

=== Per coalition ===
Definitions:

- Administration coalition: Ran solely under the banner of one of the following: Lakas–NUCD–UMDP, Laban ng Demokratikong Pilipino (Laban), Liberal Party, and PDP–Laban
- Opposition coalition: Ran solely under the banner of one of the following: Nationalist People's Coalition, Kilusang Bagong Lipunan, People's Reform Party, and Partido ng Masang Pilipino
- Others: Ran solely on other parties and coalitions not mentioned above
- Hybrid coalitions: Ran on any combinations of parties and coalitions mentioned above

| Coalition | Votes | % | Seats |
|---|---|---|---|
| Administration coalition | 13,281,704 | 69.14 | 157 |
| Opposition coalition | 2,982,071 | 15.52 | 26 |
| Hybrid coalitions | 1,215,264 | 6.33 | 12 |
| Others | 1,732,117 | 9.02 | 9 |
| Total | 19,211,156 | 100.00 | 204 |

Vote share
| Administration | 69.14% |
| Opposition | 15.52% |
| Hybrid | 6.33% |
| Others | 9.02% |

District seats
| Administration | 76.96% |
| Opposition | 12.75% |
| Hybrid | 5.88% |
| Others | 4.41% |

=== Per party ===
| Party | Votes | % | +/– | Seats | +/– |
|---|---|---|---|---|---|
| Lakas–NUCD–UMDP | 7,811,625 | 40.66 | +19.46 | 100 | +59 |
| Nationalist People's Coalition | 2,342,378 | 12.19 | −6.47 | 22 | −8 |
| Laban ng Demokratikong Pilipino | 2,079,611 | 10.83 | −22.90 | 17 | −69 |
| Lakas–Laban Coalition | 1,998,810 | 10.40 | New | 25 | New |
| Lakas–NUCD–UMDP/Liberal Party | 437,080 | 2.28 | New | 5 | New |
| Liberal Party | 358,245 | 1.86 | New | 5 | New |
| Lakas ng Bayan/Lakas–NUCD–UMDP/Nationalist People's Coalition | 257,821 | 1.34 | New | 3 | New |
| Lakas–NUCD–UMDP/Nationalist People's Coalition | 195,532 | 1.02 | New | 4 | New |
| Lakas ng Bayan/Nationalist People's Coalition | 187,705 | 0.98 | New | 2 | New |
| Nationalist People's Coalition/Kilusang Bagong Lipunan | 183,256 | 0.95 | New | 1 | New |
| People's Reform Party | 171,454 | 0.89 | New | 0 | 0 |
| Nacionalista Party | 153,088 | 0.80 | −3.12 | 1 | −6 |
| Lakas–NUCD–UMDP (independent) | 139,427 | 0.73 | New | 0 | 0 |
| PDP–Laban | 130,695 | 0.68 | New | 1 | Mew |
| Lakas ng Bayan/Liberal Party | 106,387 | 0.55 | New | 2 | New |
| Lapiang Manggagawa | 104,407 | 0.54 | New | 0 | 0 |
| Partido ng Masang Pilipino | 101,624 | 0.53 | New | 1 | New |
| Nationalist People's Coalition/Partido ng Masang Pilipino | 100,879 | 0.53 | New | 1 | New |
| Nationalist People's Coalition/PDP–Laban/People's Reform Party | 87,241 | 0.45 | New | 1 | New |
| Nationalist People's Coalition/Partido ng Masang Pilipino/Kilusang Bagong Lipunan | 75,957 | 0.40 | New | 0 | 0 |
| Lakas ng Bayan/Lakas–NUCD–UMDP/Partido ng Masang Pilipino | 71,804 | 0.37 | New | 1 | New |
| Lakas ng Bayan/Nationalist People's Coalition/Partido ng Masang Pilipino | 71,692 | 0.37 | New | 0 | 0 |
| Lakas–NUCD–UMDP/Nacionalista Party | 68,542 | 0.36 | New | 0 | 0 |
| Lakas ng Bayan/People's Reform Party | 66,176 | 0.34 | New | 1 | New |
| Lakas ng Bayan/Nacionalista Party | 65,970 | 0.34 | New | 1 | New |
| Nationalist People's Coalition/Liberal Party | 62,338 | 0.32 | New | 0 | 0 |
| Lakas–NUCD–UMDP/Lakas ng Bayan/Liberal Party | 55,991 | 0.29 | New | 0 | 0 |
| Lakas ng Bayan/PDP–Laban | 54,508 | 0.28 | New | 1 | New |
| Nationalist People's Coalition/Nacionalista Party | 54,153 | 0.28 | New | 0 | 0 |
| PDP–Laban/Partido ng Masang Pilipino/People's Reform Party | 51,752 | 0.27 | New | 1 | New |
| Lakas–NUCD–UMDP/Lakas ng Bayan/Nacionalista Party | 43,589 | 0.23 | New | 0 | 0 |
| Lakas–NUCD–UMDP/PDP–Laban | 32,417 | 0.17 | New | 1 | New |
| PDP–Laban/Nacionalista Party | 24,076 | 0.13 | New | 0 | 0 |
| Lakas–NUCD–UMDP/Lapiang Manggagawa | 15,726 | 0.08 | New | 0 | 0 |
| Lakas–NUCD–UMDP/Partido Panaghiusa | 15,631 | 0.08 | New | 0 | 0 |
| Lakas ng Bayan (independent) | 8,366 | 0.04 | New | 0 | 0 |
| Partido Demokratiko Sosyalista ng Pilipinas | 7,563 | 0.04 | New | 0 | 0 |
| Nationalist People's Coalition/People's Reform Party | 6,523 | 0.03 | New | 0 | 0 |
| People's Reform Party/Nacionalista Party | 6,214 | 0.03 | New | 0 | 0 |
| Lakas ng Bayan/Lapiang Manggagawa | 3,814 | 0.02 | New | 0 | 0 |
| Partido Nacionalista ng Pilipinas | 123 | 0.00 | New | 0 | 0 |
| Unidentified | 162,752 | 0.85 | New | 0 | 0 |
| Independent | 1,238,214 | 6.45 | +1.41 | 7 | +1 |
| Appointed seats | | | | 16 | 0 |
| Total | 19,211,156 | 100.00 | – | 220 | +4 |
| Valid votes | 19,211,156 | 74.65 | | | |
| Invalid/blank votes | 6,525,349 | 25.35 | | | |
| Total votes | 25,736,505 | 100.00 | | | |
| Registered voters/turnout | 36,415,154 | 70.68 | | | |

Vote share
| Lakas | 40.66% |
| NPC | 12.19% |
| Laban | 10.83% |
| Others | 36.32% |

District seats
| Lakas | 49.02% |
| NPC | 10.78% |
| Laban | 8.33% |
| Others | 31.87% |

=== Summary by district ===
| Congressional district | Incumbent | Incumbent's party | Winner | Winner's party |
|---|---|---|---|---|
| Abra | Jeremias Zapata | Lakas | Jeremias Zapata | Lakas |
| Agusan del Norte–1st | Charito Plaza | Lakas | Charito Plaza | Lakas |
| Agusan del Norte–2nd | Edelmiro Amante | Lakas | Eduardo Rama Sr. | Lakas |
| Agusan del Sur | Ceferino Paredes Jr. | Lakas | Ceferino Paredes Jr. | Lakas |
| Aklan | Allen Quimpo | Lakas | Allen Quimpo | Lakas |
| Albay–1st | Edcel Lagman | LDP | Edcel Lagman | LDP |
| Albay–2nd | Carlos R. Imperial | NPC | Carlos R. Imperial | NPC |
| Albay–3rd | Al Francis Bichara | NPC | Romeo Salalima | NPC |
| Antique | Exequiel Javier | Lakas | Exequiel Javier | Lakas |
| Aurora | Benedicto Miran | Lakas | Bella Angara | Lakas |
| Bacolod | Romeo Guanzon | Lakas | Romeo Guanzon | Lakas |
| Baguio | Bernardo Vergara | Lakas | Bernardo Vergara | Lakas |
| Basilan | Elnorita Tugung | Lakas | Candu Muarip | LDP |
| Bataan–1st | Felicito Payumo | Liberal | Felicito Payumo | Liberal |
| Bataan–2nd | Dominador Venegas | Lakas | Tet Garcia | NPC |
| Batanes | Enrique Lizardo | Lakas | Florencio Abad | Liberal |
| Batangas–1st | Eduardo Ermita | Lakas | Eduardo Ermita | Lakas |
| Batangas–2nd | Hernando Perez | LDP | Hernando Perez | LDP |
| Batangas–3rd | Milagros Trinidad | NPC | Milagros Trinidad | NPC |
| Batangas–4th | Ralph Recto | Lakas | Ralph Recto | Lakas |
| Benguet | Samuel Dangwa | Lakas | Ronald Cosalan | Lakas |
| Biliran | New district | | Gerardo Espina Sr. | NPC |
| Bohol–1st | Venice Agana | Lakas | Venice Agana | Lakas |
| Bohol–2nd | Erico Aumentado | Lakas | Erico Aumentado | Lakas |
| Bohol–3rd | Isidro Zarraga | Lakas | Isidro Zarraga | Lakas |
| Bukidnon–1st | Socorro Acosta | Lakas | Socorro Acosta | Lakas |
| Bukidnon–2nd | Reginaldo Tilanduca | Lakas | Reginaldo Tilanduca | Lakas |
| Bukidnon–3rd | Jose Maria Zubiri Jr. | Lakas | Jose Maria Zubiri Jr. | Lakas |
| Bulacan–1st | Teodulo Natividad | Lakas | Teodulo Natividad | Lakas |
| Bulacan–2nd | Pedro Pancho | Lakas | Pedro Pancho | Lakas |
| Bulacan–3rd | Ricardo Silverio | Lakas | Ricardo Silverio | Lakas |
| Bulacan–4th | Angelito Sarmiento | Lakas | Angelito Sarmiento | Lakas |
| Cagayan–1st | Juan Ponce Enrile | Independent | Patricio Antonio | Lakas |
| Cagayan–2nd | Edgar Lara | NPC | Edgar Lara | NPC |
| Cagayan–3rd | Francisco Mamba | Lakas | Manuel Mamba | Lakas |
| Cagayan de Oro | Erasmo Damasing | PDP–Laban | Erasmo Damasing | PDP–Laban |
| Caloocan–1st | Aurora Henson | NPC | Bobby Guanzon | Lakas |
| Caloocan–2nd | Luis Asistio | NPC | Luis Asistio | NPC |
| Camarines Norte | Emmanuel Pimentel | NPC | Emmanuel Pimentel | NPC |
| Camarines Sur–1st | Rolando Andaya | Lakas | Rolando Andaya | Lakas |
| Camarines Sur–2nd | Celso Baguio | Lakas | Leopoldo San Buenaventura | PDP–Laban |
| Camarines Sur–3rd | Arnulfo Fuentebella | NPC | Arnulfo Fuentebella | NPC |
| Camarines Sur–4th | Ciriaco Alfelor | Liberal | Ciriaco Alfelor | Liberal |
| Camiguin | Pedro Romualdo | Lakas | Pedro Romualdo | Lakas |
| Capiz–1st | Mar Roxas | Liberal | Mar Roxas | Liberal |
| Capiz–2nd | Vicente Andaya Jr. | Lakas | Vicente Andaya Jr. | Lakas |
| Catanduanes | Leandro Verceles Jr. | Lakas | Leandro Verceles Jr. | Lakas |
| Cavite–1st | Dominador Nazareno Jr. | Lakas | Plaridel Abaya | NPC |
| Cavite–2nd | Renato Dragon | LDP | Renato Dragon | LDP |
| Cavite–3rd | Telesforo Unas | LDP | Telesforo Unas | LDP |
| Cebu–1st | Eduardo Gullas | Lakas | Eduardo Gullas | Lakas |
| Cebu–2nd | Crisologo Abines | Lakas | Crisologo Abines | Lakas |
| Cebu–3rd | Pablo P. Garcia | Lakas | John Henry Osmeña | LDP |
| Cebu–4th | Celestino Martinez Jr. | NPC | Celestino Martinez Jr. | NPC |
| Cebu–5th | Ramon Durano III | Lakas | Ramon Durano III | Lakas |
| Cebu–6th | Nerissa Soon-Ruiz | Lakas | Nerissa Soon-Ruiz | Lakas |
| Cebu City–1st | Raul del Mar | Lakas | Raul del Mar | Lakas |
| Cebu City–2nd | Antonio Cuenco | Lakas | Antonio Cuenco | Lakas |
| Cotabato–1st | Anthony Dequiña | NPC | Anthony Dequiña | NPC |
| Cotabato–2nd | Gregorio Andolana | Lakas | Gregorio Andolana | Lakas |
| Davao City–1st | Jesus Dureza | NPC | Prospero Nograles | Independent |
| Davao City–2nd | Manuel Garcia | Lakas | Manuel Garcia | Lakas |
| Davao City–3rd | Elias Lopez | NPC | Elias Lopez | NPC |
| Davao del Norte–1st | Rogelio Sarmiento | Lakas | Rogelio Sarmiento | Lakas |
| Davao del Norte–2nd | Baltazar Sator | Lakas | Baltazar Sator | Lakas |
| Davao del Norte–3rd | Rodolfo del Rosario | Lakas | Rodolfo del Rosario | Lakas |
| Davao del Sur–1st | Alejandro Almendras | Lakas | Alejandro Almendras Jr. | Lakas |
| Davao del Sur–2nd | Benjamin Bautista Sr. | Lakas | Benjamin Bautista Sr. | Lakas |
| Davao Oriental–1st | Maria Elena Palma-Gil | Lakas | Maria Elena Palma-Gil | Lakas |
| Davao Oriental–2nd | Thelma Almario | Lakas | Thelma Almario | Lakas |
| Eastern Samar | Jose Ramirez | Lakas | Jose Ramirez | Lakas |
| Guimaras | New district | | Catalino Nava | Lakas |
| Ifugao | Benjamin Cappleman | NPC | Benjamin Cappleman | NPC |
| Ilocos Norte–1st | Roque Ablan Jr. | Lakas | Roque Ablan Jr. | Lakas |
| Ilocos Norte–2nd | Bongbong Marcos | KBL | Simeon Valdez | Lakas |
| Ilocos Sur–1st | Mariano Tajon | Lakas | Mariano Tajon | Lakas |
| Ilocos Sur–2nd | Eric Singson | Lakas | Eric Singson | Lakas |
| Iloilo–1st | Oscar Garin | Lakas | Oscar Garin | Lakas |
| Iloilo–2nd | Alberto Lopez | Lakas | Alberto Lopez | Lakas |
| Iloilo–3rd | Licurgo Tirador | Lakas | Licurgo Tirador | Lakas |
| Iloilo–4th | Nicetas Panes | Lakas | Narciso Monfort | LDP |
| Iloilo–5th | Niel Tupas Sr. | Lakas | Niel Tupas Sr. | Lakas |
| Iloilo City | Rafael Lopez Vito | Lakas | Raul M. Gonzalez | Nacionalista |
| Isabela–1st | Rodolfo Albano Jr. | Lakas | Rodolfo Albano Jr. | Lakas |
| Isabela–2nd | Faustino Dy Jr. | Lakas | Faustino Dy Jr. | Lakas |
| Isabela–3rd | Santiago Respicio | Lakas | Santiago Respicio | Lakas |
| Isabela–4th | Antonio Abaya | NPC | Antonio Abaya | NPC |
| Kalinga-Apayao | Elias Bulut | Lakas | Elias Bulut | Lakas |
| La Union–1st | Victor Ortega | Lakas | Victor Ortega | Lakas |
| La Union–2nd | Jose Aspiras | Lakas | Jose Aspiras | Lakas |
| Laguna–1st | Roy Almoro | Lakas | Nereo Joaquin | LDP |
| Laguna–2nd | Rodolfo Tingzon | Lakas | Jun Chipeco | LDP |
| Laguna–3rd | Florante Aquino | Lakas | Florante Aquino | Lakas |
| Laguna–4th | Magdaleno Palacol Sr. | Lakas | Magdaleno Palacol Sr. | Lakas |
| Lanao del Norte–1st | Mariano Badelles | Lakas | Mariano Badelles | Lakas |
| Lanao del Norte–2nd | Mario Hisuler | LDP | Abdullah Mangotara | Independent |
| Lanao del Sur–1st | Mamintal Adiong Sr. | Lakas | Mamintal Adiong Sr. | Lakas |
| Lanao del Sur–2nd | Mohammad Ali Dimaporo | Lakas | Pangalian Balindong | Lakas |
| Las Piñas–Muntinlupa | Manny Villar | Lakas | Manny Villar | Lakas |
| Leyte–1st | Cirilo Roy Montejo | Lakas | Imelda Marcos | KBL |
| Leyte–2nd | Sergio Apostol | Lakas | Sergio Apostol | Lakas |
| Leyte–3rd | Alberto Veloso | Lakas | Alberto Veloso | Lakas |
| Leyte–4th | Carmelo Locsin | Lakas | Carmelo Locsin | Lakas |
| Leyte–5th | Eriberto Loreto | Lakas | Eriberto Loreto | Lakas |
| Maguindanao–1st | Michael Mastura | Lakas | Didagen Dilangalen | NPC |
| Maguindanao–2nd | Simeon Datumanong | Lakas | Simeon Datumanong | Lakas |
| Makati's 1st | New district | | Joker Arroyo | Independent |
| Makati's 2nd | New district | | No winner (Note: Butz Aquino (LDP) received the most number of votes in the election, but was disqualified by the Commission on Elections on June 2, 1995 due to lack of residency.) | |
| Malabon–Navotas | Tessie Aquino-Oreta | LDP | Tessie Aquino-Oreta | LDP |
| Mandaluyong | New district | | Neptali Gonzales II | Lakas |
| Manila–1st | Martin Isidro | LDP | Martin Isidro | LDP |
| Manila–2nd | Jaime Lopez | Lakas | Jaime Lopez | Lakas |
| Manila–3rd | Leonardo Fugoso | Liberal | Leonardo Fugoso | Liberal |
| Manila–4th | Ramon Bagatsing Jr. | LDP | Ramon Bagatsing Jr. | LDP |
| Manila–5th | Amado Bagatsing | LDP | Amado Bagatsing | LDP |
| Manila–6th | Rosenda Ann Ocampo | NPC | Rosenda Ann Ocampo | NPC |
| Marikina | Romeo Candazo | Liberal | Romeo Candazo | Liberal |
| Marinduque | Carmencita Reyes | Lakas | Carmencita Reyes | Lakas |
| Masbate–1st | Vacant | | Vida Espinosa | Lakas |
| Masbate–2nd | Luz Cleta Bakunawa | Lakas | Luz Cleta Bakunawa | Lakas |
| Masbate–3rd | Antonio Kho | Liberal | Fausto Seachon Jr. | INA |
| Misamis Occidental–1st | Percival Catane | Lakas | Percival Catane | Lakas |
| Misamis Occidental–2nd | Hilarion Ramiro Jr. | Lakas | Herminia Ramiro | Lakas |
| Misamis Oriental–1st | Homobono Cesar | Lakas | Homobono Cesar | Lakas |
| Misamis Oriental–2nd | Victorico Chaves | Lakas | Victorico Chaves | Lakas |
| Mountain Province | Victor Dominguez | Lakas | Victor Dominguez | Lakas |
| Negros Occidental–1st | Tranquilino Carmona | NPC | Jules Ledesma | Lakas |
| Negros Occidental–2nd | Manuel Puey | Liberal | Alfredo Marañon | Lakas |
| Negros Occidental–3rd | Jose Carlos Lacson | Lakas | Jose Carlos Lacson | Lakas |
| Negros Occidental–4th | Edward Matti | NPC | Edward Matti | NPC |
| Negros Occidental–5th | Mariano Yulo | NPC | Mariano Yulo | NPC |
| Negros Occidental–6th | Hortensia Starke | Lakas | Genaro Alvarez Jr. | NPC |
| Negros Oriental–1st | Jerome Paras | Lakas | Jerome Paras | Lakas |
| Negros Oriental–2nd | Miguel Romero | Lakas | Miguel Romero | Lakas |
| Negros Oriental–3rd | Margarito Teves | LDP | Margarito Teves | LDP |
| Northern Samar–1st | Raul Daza | Liberal | Raul Daza | Liberal |
| Northern Samar–2nd | Wilmar Lucero | Liberal | Wilmar Lucero | Liberal |
| Nueva Ecija–1st | Renato Diaz | Lakas | Renato Diaz | Lakas |
| Nueva Ecija–2nd | Eleuterio Violago | Lakas | Eleuterio Violago | Lakas |
| Nueva Ecija–3rd | Pacifico Fajardo | Lakas | Pacifico Fajardo | Lakas |
| Nueva Ecija–4th | Victorio Lorenzo | Lakas | Julita Villareal | LDP |
| Nueva Vizcaya | Leonardo B. Perez | NPC | Carlos Padilla | LDP |
| Occidental Mindoro | Jose T. Villarosa | Lakas | Jose T. Villarosa | Lakas |
| Oriental Mindoro–1st | Renato Leviste | Lakas | Renato Leviste | Lakas |
| Oriental Mindoro–2nd | Jesus Punzalan | Lakas | Jesus Punzalan | Lakas |
| Palawan–1st | David Ponce de Leon | Lakas | Vicente Sandoval | Lakas |
| Palawan–2nd | Alfredo Amor Abueg Jr. | Lakas | Alfredo Amor Abueg Jr. | Lakas |
| Pampanga–1st | Carmelo Lazatin Sr. | Lakas | Carmelo Lazatin Sr. | Lakas |
| Pampanga–2nd | Emigdio Lingad | Lakas | Zenaida Cruz-Ducut | NPC |
| Pampanga–3rd | Andrea Domingo | Lakas | Oscar Samson Rodriguez | LDP |
| Pampanga–4th | Emigdio Bondoc | Lakas | Emigdio Bondoc | Lakas |
| Pangasinan–1st | Oscar Orbos | Lakas | Hernani Braganza | Independent |
| Pangasinan–2nd | Chris Mendoza | Lakas | Antonio Bengson III | LDP |
| Pangasinan–3rd | Eric Galo Acuña | Lakas | Eric Galo Acuña | Lakas |
| Pangasinan–4th | Jose de Venecia Jr. | Lakas | Jose de Venecia Jr. | Lakas |
| Pangasinan–5th | Amadeo Perez Jr. | Lakas | Amadeo Perez Jr. | Lakas |
| Pangasinan–6th | Conrado Estrella III | NPC | Ranjit Shahani | Lakas |
| Parañaque | Roilo Golez | Lakas | Roilo Golez | Lakas |
| Pasay | Jovito Claudio | Lakas | Jovito Claudio | Lakas |
| Pasig | Rufino Javier | NPC | Rufino Javier | NPC |
| Quezon–1st | Wilfrido Enverga | Lakas | Wilfrido Enverga | Lakas |
| Quezon–2nd | Marcial Punzalan Jr. | Lakas | Marcial Punzalan Jr. | Lakas |
| Quezon–3rd | Danilo Suarez | Lakas | Danilo Suarez | Lakas |
| Quezon–4th | Manolet Lavides | Lakas | Wigberto Tañada | Liberal |
| Quezon City–1st | Renato Yap | Lakas | Reynaldo Calalay | PMP |
| Quezon City–2nd | Dante Liban | Lakas | Dante Liban | Lakas |
| Quezon City–3rd | Dennis Roldan | Lakas | Mike Defensor | Liberal |
| Quezon City–4th | Feliciano Belmonte Jr. | Lakas | Feliciano Belmonte Jr. | Lakas |
| Quirino | Junie Cua | Lakas | Junie Cua | Lakas |
| Rizal–1st | Gilberto Duavit Sr. | NPC | Gilberto Duavit Sr. | NPC |
| Rizal–2nd | Emigdio Tanjuatco Jr. | Lakas | Emigdio Tanjuatco Jr. | Lakas |
| Romblon | Eleandro Jesus Madrona | Lakas | Eleandro Jesus Madrona | Lakas |
| Samar–1st | Rodolfo Tuazon | Lakas | Rodolfo Tuazon | Lakas |
| Samar–2nd | Catalino Figueroa | Lakas | Catalino Figueroa | Lakas |
| San Juan | New district | | Ronaldo Zamora | NPC |
| Sarangani | New district | | James Chiongbian | Lakas |
| Siquijor | Orlando Fua | Lakas | Orlando Fua | Lakas |
| Sorsogon–1st | Salvador Escudero | Lakas | Salvador Escudero | Lakas |
| Sorsogon–2nd | Bonifacio Gillego | Lakas | Bonifacio Gillego | Lakas |
| South Cotabato–1st | Luwalhati Antonino | Lakas | Luwalhati Antonino | Lakas |
| South Cotabato–2nd | Daisy Avance Fuentes | NPC | Daisy Avance Fuentes | NPC |
| Southern Leyte | Roger Mercado | Lakas | Roger Mercado | Lakas |
| Sultan Kudarat | Estanislao Valdez | Lakas | Angelo Montilla | Lakas |
| Sulu–1st | Bensaudi Tulawie | Lakas | Bensaudi Tulawie | Lakas |
| Sulu–2nd | Asani Tammang | Lakas | Asani Tammang | Lakas |
| Surigao del Norte–1st | Glenda Ecleo | NPC | Constantino Navarro Jr. | Lakas |
| Surigao del Norte–2nd | Robert Barbers | Lakas | Robert Barbers | Lakas |
| Surigao del Sur–1st | Mario Ty | Lakas | Mario Ty | Lakas |
| Surigao del Sur–2nd | Ernesto Estrella | Lakas | Jesnar Falcon | Lakas |
| Taguig–Pateros | Dante Tiñga | Lakas | Dante Tiñga | Lakas |
| Tarlac–1st | Peping Cojuangco | LDP | Peping Cojuangco | LDP |
| Tarlac–2nd | Jose Yap | Lakas | Jose Yap | Lakas |
| Tarlac–3rd | Herminio Aquino | LDP | Herminio Aquino | LDP |
| Tawi-Tawi | Nur Jaafar | Lakas | Nur Jaafar | Lakas |
| Valenzuela | Antonio Serapio | NPC | Antonio Serapio | NPC |
| Zambales–1st | Katherine Gordon | Nacionalista | James Gordon Jr. | Nacionalista |
| Zambales–2nd | Antonio Diaz | Lakas | Antonio Diaz | Lakas |
| Zamboanga City | Maria Clara Lobregat | LDP | Maria Clara Lobregat | LDP |
| Zamboanga del Norte–1st | Artemio Adasa Jr. | Lakas | Romeo Jalosjos Sr. | Independent |
| Zamboanga del Norte–2nd | Ernesto Amatong | Liberal | Cresente Llorente Jr. | NPC |
| Zamboanga del Norte–3rd | Angel Carloto | Lakas | Angel Carloto | Lakas |
| Zamboanga del Sur–1st | Alejandro Urro | Lakas | Alejandro Urro | Lakas |
| Zamboanga del Sur–2nd | Antonio Cerilles | NPC | Antonio Cerilles | NPC |
| Zamboanga del Sur–3rd | Belma Cabilao | Lakas | Belma Cabilao | Lakas |

== Defeated incumbents ==
1. Aurora: Benedicto Miran (Lakas) lost to Bella Angara (Lakas)
2. Basilan: Elnorita Tugung (Lakas) lost to Candu Muarip (LDP)
3. Bataan–2nd: Dominador Venegas (Lakas) lost to Tet Garcia (NPC)
4. Batanes: Enrique Lizardo (Lakas) lost to Florencio Abad (Liberal)
5. Benguet: Samuel Dangwa (Lakas) lost to Ronald Cosalan (Lakas)
6. Caloocan–1st: Aurora Henson (NPC) lost to Bobby Guanzon (Lakas)
7. Camarines Sur–2nd: Celso Baguio (Lakas) lost to Leopoldo San Buenaventura (PDP–Laban)
8. Cavite–1st: Dominador Nazareno Jr. (Lakas) lost to Plaridel Abaya (NPC)
9. Davao City–1st: Jesus Dureza (NPC) lost to Prospero Nograles (Independent)
10. Iloilo–4th: Nicetas Panes (Lakas) lost to Narciso Monfort (LDP)
11. Iloilo City: Rafael Lopez Vito (Lakas) lost to Raul M. Gonzalez (Nacionalista)
12. Laguna–1st: Roy Almoro of (Lakas) lost to Nereo Joaquin (LDP)
13. Lanao del Norte–2nd: Mario Hisuler (LDP) lost to Abdullah Mangotara (Independent)
14. Leyte–1st: Cirilo Roy Montejo (Lakas) lost to Imelda Marcos (KBL)
15. Maguindanao–1st: Michael Mastura (Lakas) lost to Didagen Dilangalen (NPC)
16. Negros Occidental–1st: Tranquilino Carmona (NPC) lost to Jules Ledesma (Lakas)
17. Negros Occidental–2nd: Manuel Puey (Liberal) lost to Alfredo Marañon of (Lakas)
18. Negros Occidental–6th: Hortensia Starke (Lakas) lost to Genaro Alvarez Jr. (NPC)
19. Nueva Ecija–4th: Victorio Lorenzo (Lakas) lost to Julita Villareal (LDP)
20. Nueva Vizcaya: Leonardo B. Perez (NPC) lost to Carlos Padilla (LDP)
21. Palawan–1st: David Ponce de Leon (Lakas) lost to Vicente Sandoval (Lakas)
22. Pampanga–2nd: Emigdio Lingad (Lakas) lost to Zenaida Cruz-Ducut (NPC)
23. Pampanga–3rd: Andrea D. Domingo (Lakas) lost to Oscar Samson Rodriguez (LDP)
24. Pangasinan–2nd: Chris Mendoza (Lakas) lost to Antonio Bengson III (LDP)
25. Quezon–4th: Manolet Lavides (Lakas) lost to Wigberto Tañada (Liberal)
26. Quezon City–1st: Renato Yap of (Lakas) lost to Reynaldo Calalay (PMP)
27. Quezon City–3rd: Dennis Roldan (Lakas) lost to Mike Defensor (Liberal)
28. Sultan Kudarat: Estanislao Valdez (Lakas) lost to Angelo Montilla (Lakas)
29. Surigao del Norte–1st: Glenda Ecleo (NPC) lost to Constantino Navarro Jr. of (Lakas)
30. Surigao del Sur–2nd: Ernesto Estrella (Lakas) lost to Jesnar Falcon (Lakas)
31. Zamboanga del Norte–1st: Artemio Adasa Jr. (Lakas) lost to Romeo Jalosjos Sr. (Independent)
32. Zamboanga del Norte–2nd: Ernesto Amatong (Liberal) lost to Cresente Llorente Jr. (NPC)

== See also ==
- 10th Congress of the Philippines

== Bibliography ==
- Paras, Corazon L. (2000). The Presidents of the Senate of the Republic of the Philippines. ISBN 971-8832-24-6.
- Pobre, Cesar P. (2000). Philippine Legislature 100 Years. ISBN 971-92245-0-9.
- Teehankee, Julio. "Electoral Politics in the Philippines" (PDF). quezon.ph.
