= Minority Floor Leader of the House of Representatives of the Philippines =

Government role in the Philippines

- Lider ng Minorya ng Kapulungan ng mga Kinatawan ng Pilipinas
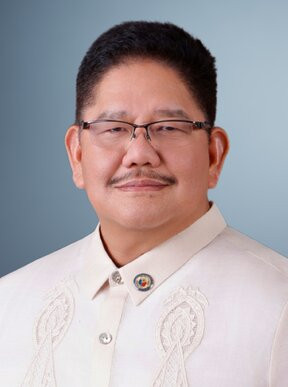
- Incumbent; Marcelino Libanan since July 25, 2022
- Style: The Honorable
- Appointer: Affirmed by the House of Representatives
- Inaugural holder: Vicente Singson Encarnación
- Formation: 1907
- Website: House of Representatives of the Philippines

The minority floor leader of the House of Representatives of the Philippines (Filipino: Lider ng Minorya ng Kapulungan ng mga Kinatawan ng Pilipinas), or simply the House minority floor leader, is the leader elected by the minority bloc of the House of Representatives of the Philippines that serves as their official leader in the body. He also manages the business of the minority party in the House. He is expected to be vigilant in the defense of the minority's rights. It is his function and duty to criticize constructively the policies and programs of the majority, and to this end employ parliamentary tactics and give close attention to all proposed legislation.

Traditionally, the defeated contender in the speakership election becomes the minority leader, but the rules were amended for the 17th Congress with the minority bloc now electing their minority leader among themselves.

== History ==
From 1907 to 1909, Vicente Singson Encarnación, a member of the Progresista Party, served as the minority floor leader of the newly-inaugurated Philippine Assembly during the 1st Philippine Legislature.

The Nacionalista Party, which was the historical ruling party in both houses of Congress in the early 1900s, served as the opposition party to the Liberal Party in the House from 1946 until 1953, after the Liberals won the majority of congressional seats in two consecutive elections. Nacionalista members Cipriano Primicias Sr. and Jose Laurel Jr. served as minority leaders in the 1st and 2nd Congresses, respectively.

On March 9, 1962, Daniel Romualdez of the Nacionalista Party was ousted from the speakership by Liberal Cornelio Villareal and served as minority leader during the 5th Congress.

== List of minority floor leaders ==
This list also includes the minority floor leaders of the Philippine Assembly (1907–1916), the Commonwealth National Assembly (1935–1941), the Second Republic National Assembly (1943–1944), and the Batasang Pambansa (1978–1986).

=== Philippine Assembly (1907–1916) ===
No.	Portrait	Name (Birth–Death)	Term of office		Party	Legislature
No.	Portrait	Name (Birth–Death)	Took office	Left office	Party	Legislature
1		Vicente Singson Encarnación; Member for Ilocos Sur–1st (1875–1961)	1907	1909	Progresista	1st Legislature

=== House of Representatives (1945–1973) ===
No.	Portrait	Name (Birth–Death)	Term of office		Party	Legislature
No.	Portrait	Name (Birth–Death)	Took office	Left office	Party	Legislature
2		Cipriano Primicias Sr. Member for Pangasinan–4th (1901–1965)	May 25, 1946	December 30, 1949	Nacionalista	2nd Commonwealth Congress
2		Cipriano Primicias Sr. Member for Pangasinan–4th (1901–1965)	May 25, 1946	December 30, 1949	Nacionalista	1st Congress
3		Jose Laurel Jr. Member for Batangas–3rd (1912–1998)	December 30, 1949	December 30, 1953	Nacionalista	2nd Congress
4		Eugenio Pérez; Member for Pangasinan–2nd (1896–1957)	January 25, 1954	August 4, 1957	Liberal	3rd Congress
5		Ferdinand Marcos; Member for Ilocos Norte–2nd (1917–1989)	January 27, 1958	December 30, 1959	Liberal	4th Congress
6		Cornelio Villareal; Member for Capiz–2nd (1904–1992)	January 25, 1960	March 9, 1962	Liberal	4th Congress
6		Cornelio Villareal; Member for Capiz–2nd (1904–1992)	January 25, 1960	March 9, 1962	Liberal	5th Congress
7		Daniel Romualdez; Member for Leyte–1st (1907–1965)	March 9, 1962	March 22, 1965	Nacionalista	5th Congress
8		Jose Laurel Jr. Member for Batangas–3rd (1912–1998)	January 17, 1966	February 2, 1967	Nacionalista	6th Congress
9		Cornelio Villareal; Member for Capiz–2nd (1904–1992)	February 2, 1967	December 30, 1969	Liberal	6th Congress
10		Justiniano Montano; Member for Cavite–Lone (1905–2005)	January 26, 1970	June 12, 1971	Liberal	7th Congress
11		Ramon Mitra Jr. Member for Palawan–2nd (1928–2000)	June 12, 1971	December 30, 1971	Liberal	7th Congress
12		Ramon Felipe Jr. Member for Camarines Sur–1st (1920–2017)	January 24, 1972	January 17, 1973	Liberal	7th Congress

=== Batasang Pambansa (1978–1986) ===
No.	Portrait	Name (Birth–Death)	Term of office		Party	Legislature
No.	Portrait	Name (Birth–Death)	Took office	Left office	Party	Legislature
13		Hilario Davide Jr. Member for Region VII (born 1935)	June 12, 1978	June 30, 1984	Pusyon Bisaya	Interim Batasang Pambansa
14		Jose Laurel Jr. Member for Batangas (1912–1998)	June 30, 1984	March 25, 1986	UNIDO	Regular Batasang Pambansa

=== House of Representatives (1987–present) ===
No.	Portrait	Name (Birth–Death)	Term of office		Party	Legislature
No.	Portrait	Name (Birth–Death)	Took office	Left office	Party	Legislature
15		Rodolfo Albano Jr. Member for Isabela–1st (1934–2019)	July 27, 1987	October 20, 1989	KBL	8th Congress
16		Mohammad Ali Dimaporo; Member for Lanao del Sur–2nd (1918–2004)	October 20, 1989	June 1, 1990	KBL	8th Congress
17		Salvador Escudero; Member for Sorsogon–1st (1942–2012)	June 1, 1990	July 22, 1991	KBL	8th Congress
18		Victor Ortega; Member for La Union–1st (born 1934)	July 22, 1991	June 30, 1992	Nacionalista	8th Congress
19		Hernando Perez; Member for Batangas–2nd (born 1939)	July 22, 1992	June 30, 1995	LDP	9th Congress
20		Ronaldo Zamora; Member for San Juan–Mandaluyong–Lone (born 1944)	July 24, 1995	June 30, 1998	NPC	10th Congress
21		Feliciano Belmonte Jr. Member for Quezon City–4th (born 1936)	July 27, 1998	January 24, 2001	Lakas	11th Congress
22		Butz Aquino; Member for Makati–2nd (1939–2015)	January 24, 2001	June 30, 2001	LDP	11th Congress
23		Carlos Padilla; Member for Nueva Vizcaya–Lone (1944–2023)	July 23, 2001	June 30, 2004	LDP	12th Congress
24		Francis Escudero; Member for Sorsogon–1st (born 1969)	July 26, 2004	June 30, 2007	NPC	13th Congress
25		Ronaldo Zamora; Member for San Juan–Lone (born 1944)	July 23, 2007	June 30, 2010	NPC	14th Congress
26		Edcel Lagman; Member for Albay–1st (1942–2025)	July 26, 2010	January 20, 2012	Lakas	15th Congress
27		Danilo Suarez; Member for Quezon–3rd (born 1942)	January 20, 2012	June 30, 2013	Lakas	15th Congress
28		Ronaldo Zamora; Member for San Juan–Lone (born 1944)	July 22, 2013	June 30, 2016	Nacionalista	16th Congress
29		Danilo Suarez; Member for Quezon–3rd (born 1942)	July 25, 2016	June 30, 2019	Lakas	17th Congress
30		Benny Abante; Member for Manila–6th (born 1951)	July 22, 2019	October 16, 2020	Asenso Manileño	18th Congress
31		Stephen Paduano; Party-list member (born 1965)	October 16, 2020	June 30, 2022	Abang Lingkod	18th Congress
32		Marcelino Libanan; Party-list member (born 1963)	July 26, 2022	Incumbent	4Ps	19th Congress
32		Marcelino Libanan; Party-list member (born 1963)	July 26, 2022	Incumbent	4Ps	20th Congress

== See also ==
- Majority Floor Leader of the House of Representatives of the Philippines
