= Jose Mari Gonzales =

Filipino actor (1938–2019)

Member of the Philippine House of Representatives from San Juan
- In office June 30, 1998 – June 30, 2001
- Preceded by: Ronaldo Zamora
- Succeeded by: Ronaldo Zamora

Personal details
- Born: José María González y Chacarrátegui; July 26, 1938 Manila, Commonwealth of the Philippines
- Died: April 16, 2019 (aged 80) Muntinlupa, Philippines
- Party: Liberal (1987–1988, 2001); Independent (1987)
- Other political affiliations: Lakas–NUCD (1996–1998); LAMMP (1998–2000)
- Children: 5, including Cristina Gonzales
- Occupation: Actor, businessman, electronics engineer, politician

José María Chacarrátegui González (July 26, 1938 – April 16, 2019), professionally known as Jose Mari Gonzales or Jose Mari, was a Filipino actor, entertainment executive, electronics engineer and politician. A matinee idol in the 1950s and 1960s, he served as the manager of singer Freddie Aguilar in the 1980s, and assisted Radio Veritas in maintaining its broadcast during the People Power Revolution in February 1986. In the aftermath of the revolution, Gonzales was appointed officer-in-charge of the Bureau of Broadcast Services by President Corazon Aquino, and later served as general manager of the television station Radio Philippines Network from 1994 to January 1996.

From 1998 to 2001, Gonzales served as representative of the city of San Juan, Metro Manila. In November 2000, Gonzales karate chopped Bayani Fabic, the Sergeant-at-Arms of the House of Representatives, in the face on live television amidst the impeachment of President Joseph Estrada, for which he was found guilty of grave slander by deed by the Quezon City Regional Trial Court in 2010.

== Career ==
=== Entertainment career ===
Gonzalez entered the movies at the age of 17 in the late 1950s. He appeared in Ulilang Anghel (1958), Tawag ng Tanghalan (1958), Mga Anghel sa Lansangan (1959), Handsome (1959) and Baby Face (1959). He became a matinee idol in Sampaguita Pictures in films such as Beatnik (1960) with Susan Roces, Joey, Eddie, Lito (1961) with Eddie Gutiérrez and Lito Legaspi, Operatang Sampay Bakod (1961) with Amalia Fuentes and Dolphy, Tindahan ni Aling Epang (1961) with Liberty Ilagan, Kaming Mga Talyada (1962) where he played gay roles together with Juancho Gutiérrez, Dindo Fernando and Barbara Pérez among others.

In the 1960s, he was paired with Liberty Ilagan as a "loveteam" in Sampaguita Pictures films. Larry Santiago Productions continued their team-up in the 1966 film Dearest One.

In 1971, Gonzales was elected the first president of the Philippine Association of the Record Industry (PARI).

As manager of folk singer Freddie Aguilar, Gonzales denounced the censorship of Aguilar's compositions in 1983 and those who reportedly sponsored its motion: record producers Ramon Chuaying (WEA Records), James Dy (Dyna Records) and Vic del Rosario (Vicor Music). When the charity single "Handog ng Pilipino sa Mundo" was about to be recorded by a supergroup under WEA Records in the aftermath of the 1986 People Power Revolution, Gonzales rejected WEA's offer to have Aguilar participate as one of the singers.

Gonzales produced the song "Enveloped Ideas", the first single of The Dawn, in 1987.

In 1986, during the term of President Corazon Aquino, Gonzalez was appointed director of the Bureau of Broadcast Services (now the Presidential Broadcast Service). By 1994, he was a member of the board of directors at the state-owned television station Radio Philippines Network (RPN), soon becoming its president and general manager. As a TV executive, he adapted the telenovelas Marimar and La Traidora, dubbed in Filipino, for the Philippine audience. On January 7, 1996, President Fidel V. Ramos removed Gonzales from his general manager position at RPN, and appointed public relations practitioner Rex D. Lores as his successor.

In 2005, Gonzales was inducted in the Eastwood City Walk of Fame in Eastwood City, Quezon City.

=== Participation in the Agrava hearing and People Power Revolution ===
In August 1984 and March 1985, Gonzales gave his testimony as an electronics expert before the Agrava Board regarding an audio recording made by Time magazine correspondent Sandra Burton during the assassination of Ninoy Aquino on August 21, 1983, in which voices were heard saying "Eto na, eto na! Ako na, ako na! Op! Pusila, pusila!" (transl. This is it, this is it! Let me, let me! Shoot, shoot!) prior to a gunshot. The Sandiganbayan itself listened to the recording at Gonzales' sound studio, with lawyer Mario Bautista recalling that "they decided to dim the lights so that those listening could focus on the tape. And shortly before the tape was played, the room fell silent. And I found myself standing in a corner right beside this big speaker.

On February 23, 1986, a young military officer who was a member of the Reform the Armed Forces Movement (RAM) requested Gonzales' assistance in strengthening the weakened signal of Radio Veritas, which had issued the messages of Cardinal Jaime Sin and Butz Aquino the night before that initiated the ongoing People Power Revolution. Gonzales proceeded to Camp Crame to set up a short wave band of high frequency to serve as a simulcast station for Radio Veritas and other broadcasters. For his actions, Gonzales received an award from the Philippine Amateur Radio Association (PARA) for "exemplary courage and devotion to country during the Revolution of 1986."

=== Political career ===
In 1987, Gonzales ran as independent candidate in San Juan–Mandaluyong's congressional district, but lost to former Assemblyman Ronaldo Zamora. In 1988, he ran for mayor of Mandaluyong, but lost to former OIC Mayor Benjamin Abalos. In 1998, he ran for Congress as an independent candidate and won in San Juan, Metro Manila. He coalesced with the administration-aligned Laban ng Makabayang Masang Pilipino (LAMMP). On November 13, 2000, Gonzales was involved in a slapping incident of retired general Bayani Fabic, Sergeant-at-Arms of the House of Representatives, which occurred when Gonzales attempted to grab the institutional mace upon Deputy Speaker Alfredo Abueg Jr. declaring suspension of the session soon after the House impeached President Joseph Estrada. The action was later explained to be a "karate chop", with Gonzales stating that it was due to his frustration toward Fabic for failing to pacify cheering congressmen in the session hall. He later issued a public apology for his actions, but was later charged on April 23, 2001 for grave slander by deed before the Quezon City Metropolitan Trial Court Branch 39.

Gonzales ran for re-election as representative in 2001 under Liberal Party but lost to his predecessor, Zamora. He was the leader of the United Opposition of San Juan, which also asked the Commission on Elections (COMELEC) to declare a failure of election in San Juan, citing alleged vote buying and harassment by the winning party. After he lost reelection, Gonzales was arrested at his home on the afternoon of May 24, 2001 by the Criminal Investigation and Detection Group of the Philippine National Police, but soon posted a bail bond of 6,000 pesos and was released. For the misdeed and after a lengthy court trial in which Gonzales pleaded "not guilty", the Quezon City Regional Trial Court found Gonzalez guilty on criminal charges of grave slander by deed in February 2010, which was later affirmed by the Court of Appeals in October 2013.

== Personal life ==
Gonzalez was born in Manila. He studied at De La Salle College in Manila, majoring in Electronics and Communication Engineering.

He was married to Charito Malarkey, a former model of Spanish and British ancestry. Their paths first crossed when she was twelve and he, seventeen. He was the father of actresses Cristina "Kring Kring" González Romuáldez (wife of Tacloban Mayor Alfred Romuáldez) and Ana Margarita González.

== Filmography ==
Film performances
Year	Title	Role	Notes	Ref(s).
1958	Ulilang Angel			
1958	Tawag ng Tanghalan			
1959	Handsome			
1959	Baby Face			
1960	Laura			
1960	Amy, Susie, & Tessie			
1960	7 Amores			
1961	Joey, Eddie, Lito			
1962	Pitong Kalbaryo ni Inang			
1962	Kaming Mga Talyada			
1962	The Big Broadcast			
1962	Barilan Sa Baboy Kural			
1963	Dance O-Rama			
1963	Amaliang Mali-Mali vs. Susanang Daldal			
1963	King and Queen for a Day			
1963	Ako'y Ibigin Mo, Dalagang Matapang			
1964	The Nite Owl			
1964	Let's Go			
1964	Show Business			
1965	Maria Cecilia			
1965	Ana Roberta			
1966	Viva Ranchera			
1967	Operation: Discotheque			

== See also ==
- Legislative district of San Juan, Metro Manila
