= Davao del Norte's 3rd congressional district =

Legislative district of the Philippines

Davao del Norte's 3rd congressional district is an obsolete congressional district in Davao del Norte for the House of Representatives of the Philippines from 1987 to 1998. The district encompassed six municipalities of the previously undivided province, most of which now constitute the 2nd district. It was created ahead of the 1987 Philippine House of Representatives elections following the ratification of the 1987 constitution which established three districts for Davao del Norte. Prior to the 1987 apportionment, Davao del Norte residents elected their representatives to the national legislatures on a provincewide basis through the Davao del Norte's at-large congressional district. The district was last contested at the 1995 Philippine House of Representatives elections. It was eliminated by the 1998 reapportionment after the province lost significant territory to the new province of Compostela Valley (now Davao de Oro) created through Republic Act No. 8740 on January 30, 1998.

== Representation history ==
#	Image	Member	Term of office		Congress	Party	Electoral history	Constituent LGUs
#	Image	Member	Start	End	Congress	Party	Electoral history	Constituent LGUs
=== Davao del Norte's 3rd district for the House of Representatives of the Philippines ===
District created February 2, 1987 from Davao del Norte's at-large district.
1		Rodolfo P. del Rosario	June 30, 1987	June 30, 1998	8th	Lakas ng Bansa	Elected in 1987.	1987–1998; Babak, Carmen, Kaputian, Panabo, Samal, Santo Tomas
1		Rodolfo P. del Rosario	June 30, 1987	June 30, 1998	9th	LDP	Re-elected in 1992.	1987–1998; Babak, Carmen, Kaputian, Panabo, Samal, Santo Tomas
1		Rodolfo P. del Rosario	June 30, 1987	June 30, 1998	10th	Lakas	Re-elected in 1995.	1987–1998; Babak, Carmen, Kaputian, Panabo, Samal, Santo Tomas
District dissolved into Compostela Valley's 1st and 2nd districts

== See also ==
- Legislative districts of Davao del Norte
