= San Juan–Mandaluyong's at-large congressional district =

Legislative district of the Philippines

San Juan–Mandaluyong's at-large congressional district was the combined representation of the Metro Manila municipalities (now highly urbanized cities) of Mandaluyong and San Juan in the Regular Batasang Pambansa (1984–1986) and the lower house of the Congress of the Philippines (1987–1995).

Since 1995, the cities of Mandaluyong and San Juan have been represented separately through their respective lone congressional districts: Mandaluyong and San Juan. This separation followed the enactment of Republic Act No. 7675 and its approval by plebiscite on April 4, 1994, which converted Mandaluyong into a highly urbanized city. Per Section 49 of Republic Act No. 7675, Mandaluyong was established as its own congressional district, thereby granting San Juan separate representation as well. Both cities elected their respective representatives in the 1995 elections.

== History ==
Prior to gaining joint representation, San Juan and Mandaluyong were represented under the province of Manila (1898–1899) and Rizal (1907–1941; 1945–1972) and the City of Greater Manila (1943–1944). These two municipalities were separated from the province to form the Metropolitan Manila Area on 7 November 1975 by virtue of Presidential Decree No. 824; Metro Manila was represented in the Interim Batasang Pambansa as Region IV from 1978 to 1984.

Among the amendments to the 1973 Constitution of the Philippines which were approved in the January 1984 plebiscite was a new apportionment ordinance for the election of Regular Batasang Pambansa members, as embodied in Batas Pambansa Blg. 643. Under this apportionment ordinance, the municipalities of Mandaluyong and San Juan were grouped into a single parliamentary district which was allotted one representative, who was elected at large in the May 1984 elections. The combined representation of the two municipalities lasted until the abolition of the Regular Batasang Pambansa in the aftermath of the People Power Revolution in 1986.

Under the new Constitution which was proclaimed on 11 February 1987, the municipalities constituted the congressional district of San Juan–Mandaluyong, and elected its member to the restored House of Representatives starting that same year.

The enactment of Republic Act No. 7675 and its subsequent approval by plebiscite on 4 April 1994 converted Mandaluyong into a highly urbanized city. Per Section 49 of R.A. 7675 Mandaluyong was constituted into its own congressional district, which effectively created separate representation for San Juan as well. Both elected their separate representatives in the 1995 elections.

#	Image	Member	Term of office		Congress	Party	Electoral history
#	Image	Member	Start	End	Congress	Party	Electoral history
=== San Juan–Mandaluyong's at-large district for the Regular Batasang Pambansa ===
District created February 1, 1984, from Region IV's at-large district.
1		Neptali A. Gonzales	July 23, 1984	March 25, 1986	2nd	UNIDO	Elected in 1984.
=== San Juan–Mandaluyong's at-large district for the House of Representatives of the Philippines ===
District re-created February 2, 1987.
2		Ronaldo B. Zamora	June 30, 1987	June 30, 1995	8th	Independent	Elected in 1987.
2		Ronaldo B. Zamora	June 30, 1987	June 30, 1995	9th	LDP	Re-elected in 1992. Redistricted to San Juan's at-large district.
District dissolved into San Juan and Mandaluyong's at-large districts.

== See also ==
- Legislative districts of Rizal
- Legislative district of Mandaluyong
- Legislative district of San Juan
