= Sultan Kudarat's at-large congressional district =

District in the Philippines

Sultan Kudarat's at-large congressional district is an obsolete congressional district that encompassed the entire province of Sultan Kudarat in the Philippines. It was represented in the House of Representatives from 1987 to 2007 and earlier in the Batasang Pambansa from 1984 to 1986. The province of Sultan Kudarat was created by the further division of Cotabato into three provinces in 1973 out of eleven southernmost municipalities of what remained of the former province. Due to the absence of a legislature since the 1972 imposition of martial law, no electoral district was formed in the new province under its charter. When a national parliament known as the Batasang Pambansa was convened in 1978, Sultan Kudarat and four other provinces in Central Mindanao were collectively represented by eight delegates who were elected across Region XII. The first time a provincewide at-large district was used to elect representatives for Sultan Kudarat was during the 1984 Philippine parliamentary election for a seat in the Regular Batasang Pambansa.

Sultan Kudarat continued to return one member from its at-large district to the restored House of Representatives beginning in 1987. This district became obsolete following the 2006 reapportionment into two districts that took effect in the 2007 Philippine House of Representatives elections.

== Representation history ==
#	Image	Member	Term of office		Batasang Pambansa	Party	Electoral history
#	Image	Member	Start	End	Batasang Pambansa	Party	Electoral history
=== Sultan Kudarat's at-large district for the Regular Batasang Pambansa ===
District created February 1, 1984.
1		Benjamin C. Duque	July 23, 1984	March 25, 1986	2nd	KBL	Elected in 1984.
#	Image	Member	Term of office		Congress	Party	Electoral history
#	Image	Member	Start	End	Congress	Party	Electoral history
=== Sultan Kudarat's at-large district for the House of Representatives of the Philippines ===
District re-created February 2, 1987.
2		Estanislao V. Valdez	June 30, 1987	June 30, 1995	8th	PDP–Laban	Elected in 1987.
2		Estanislao V. Valdez	June 30, 1987	June 30, 1995	9th	LDP	Re-elected in 1992.
3		Angelo O. Montilla	June 30, 1995	June 30, 2004	10th	Lakas	Elected in 1995.
3		Angelo O. Montilla	June 30, 1995	June 30, 2004	11th	NPC (LAMMP)	Re-elected in 1998.
3		Angelo O. Montilla	June 30, 1995	June 30, 2004	12th	Lakas	Re-elected in 2001.
4		Suharto T. Mangudadatu	June 30, 2004	June 30, 2007	13th	KAMPI	Elected in 2004.
District dissolved into Sultan Kudarat's 1st and 2nd districts.

== See also ==
- Legislative districts of Sultan Kudarat
