= 10th Congress of the Philippines =

31st legislative term of the Philippines

←	9th	11th	→
- Old Legislative Building (c. 1988) (top) and Batasang Pambansa Complex (2010) (bottom)

Overview
- Term: July 24, 1995 – June 5, 1998
- President: Fidel Ramos
- Vice President: Joseph Estrada

Senate
- Members: 24
- President: Edgardo Angara (until August 28, 1995); Neptali Gonzales (August 29, 1995 – October 10, 1996, and from January 26, 1998); Ernesto Maceda (October 10, 1996 – January 26, 1998)
- President pro tempore: Leticia Ramos-Shahani (until October 10, 1996); Blas Ople (from October 10, 1996)
- Majority leader: Alberto Romulo (until October 10, 1996); Francisco Tatad (October 10, 1996 – January 26, 1998); Franklin Drilon (from January 26, 1998)
- Minority leader: Ernesto Maceda (until August 29, 1995, and from January 26, 1998); Edgardo Angara (August 29, 1995 – October 10, 1996); Neptali Gonzales (October 10, 1996 – January 26, 1998)

House of Representatives
- Members: 226
- Speaker: Jose de Venecia Jr.
- Deputy Speakers: Hernando Perez; Raul Daza; Simeon Datumanong
- Majority leader: Rodolfo Albano Jr.
- Minority leader: Ronaldo Zamora

The 10th Congress of the Philippines (Filipino: Ikasampung Kongreso ng Pilipinas), composed of the Philippine Senate and House of Representatives, met from July 24, 1995, until June 5, 1998, during the last three years of Fidel Ramos's presidency. The convening of the 10th Congress followed the 1995 national elections, which replaced half of the Senate membership, and the entire membership of the House of Representatives.

== Sessions ==
- First Special Session: June 26 – July 7, 1995
- First Regular Session: July 24, 1995 – June 7, 1996
  - First Joint Session: April 1 and June 3, 1996
  - Second Special Session: May 13 – June 21, 1996
- Second Regular Session: July 22, 1996 – June 13, 1997
  - Third Special Session: August 12 – 30, 1996
  - Fourth Special Session: January 6 – 31, 1997
  - Fifth Special Session: February 3 – 28, 1997
  - Second Joint Session: January 27, February 10, February 24, March 3 and March 10 – 17, 1997
- Third Regular Session: July 28, 1997 – June 5, 1998
  - Third Joint Session: February 16 – March 6, 1998
  - Sixth Special Session: March 16 – 20, 1998
  - Seventh Special Session: April 6 – 10, 1998
  - Eighth Special Session: April 12 – May 1, 1998

== Legislation ==
Laws passed by the 10th Congress:

Intellectual Property Code of the Philippines (took effect on January 1, 1998).

== Leadership ==
=== Senate ===
Senate President

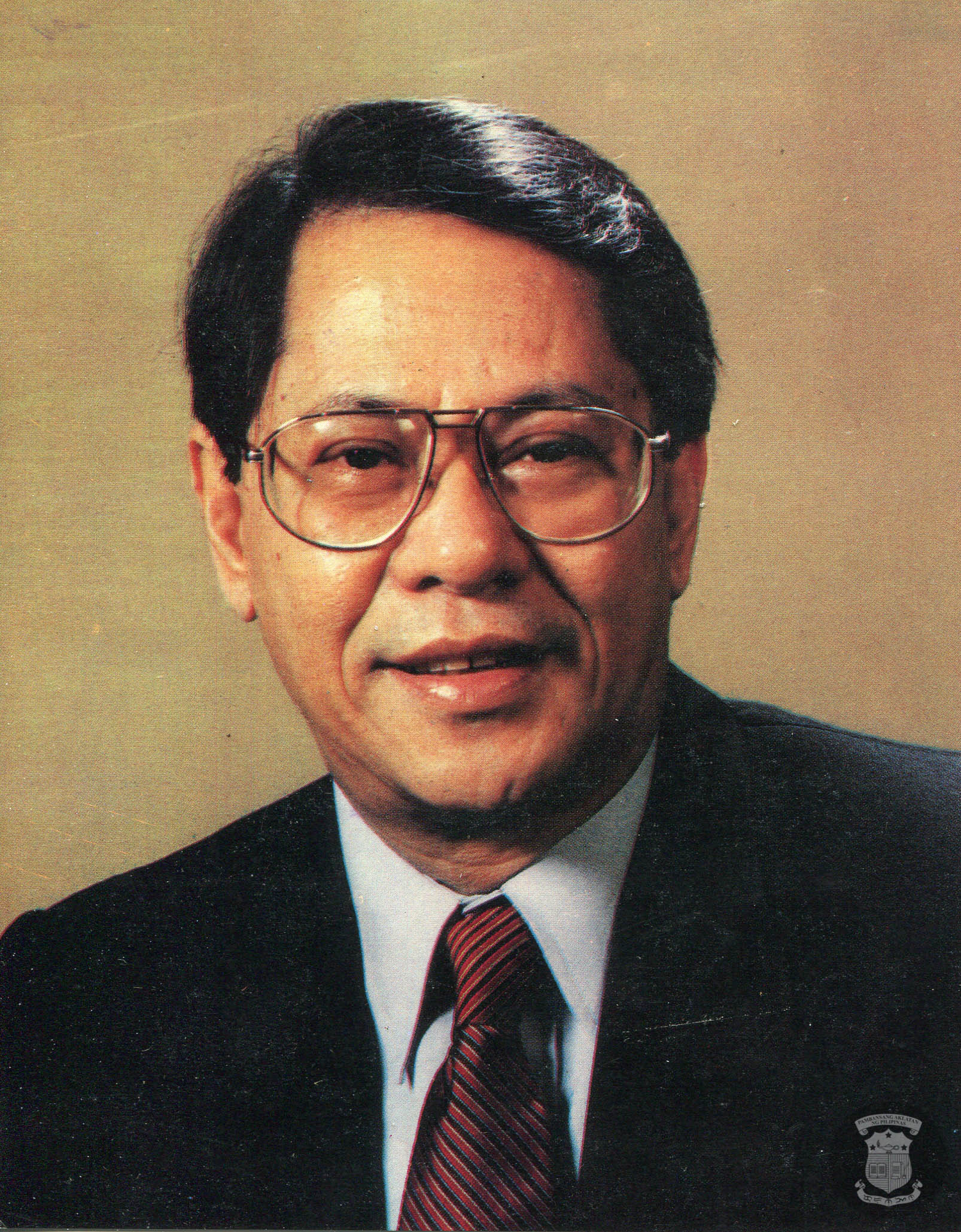
Edgardo Angara,
until August 28, 1995

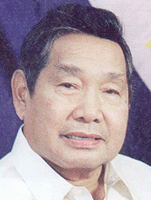
Neptali Gonzales,
August 29, 1995 – October 10, 1996, from January 26, 1998

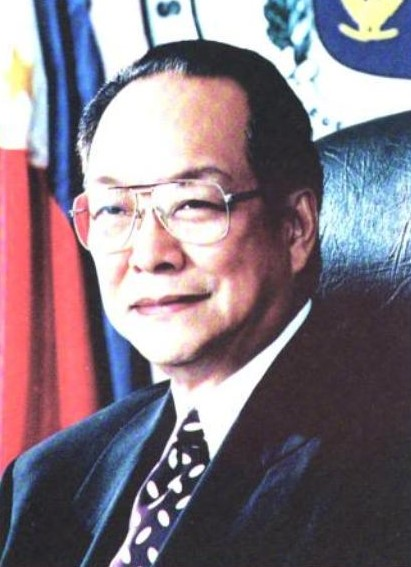
Ernesto Maceda,
October 10, 1996 – January 26, 1998

- President:
  - Edgardo Angara (LDP), until August 28, 1995
  - Neptali Gonzales (LDP), August 29, 1995 – October 10, 1996, and from January 26, 1998
  - Ernesto Maceda (NPC), October 10, 1996 – January 26, 1998
- President pro tempore:
  - Leticia Ramos-Shahani (Lakas), until October 10, 1996
  - Blas Ople (LDP), from October 10, 1996
- Majority Floor Leader:
  - Alberto Romulo (LDP), until October 10, 1996
  - Francisco Tatad (LDP), October 10, 1996 – January 26, 1998
  - Franklin Drilon (LAMMP), from January 26, 1998
- Minority Floor Leader:
  - Ernesto Maceda (NPC), until August 29, 1995, and from January 26, 1998
  - Edgardo Angara (LDP), August 29, 1995 – October 10, 1996
  - Neptali Gonzales (LDP), October 10, 1996 – January 26, 1998

=== House of Representatives ===
House Speaker

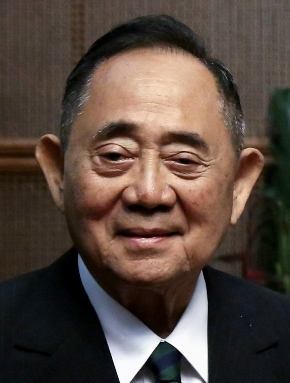
Jose de Venecia Jr.

- Speaker: Jose de Venecia Jr. (Pangasinan–4th, Lakas)
- Deputy Speakers:
  - Luzon: Hernando Perez (Batangas–2nd, LDP)
  - Visayas: Raul Daza (Northern Samar–1st, Liberal)
  - Mindanao: Simeon Datumanong (Maguindanao–2nd, Lakas)
- Majority Floor Leader: Rodolfo Albano Jr. (Isabela–1st, Lakas)
- Minority Floor Leader: Ronaldo Zamora (San Juan–Lone, NPC)

== Members ==
=== Senate ===
Final Senate composition.

The following are the terms of the senators of this Congress, according to the date of election:

- For senators elected on May 11, 1992: June 30, 1992 – June 30, 1998
- For senators elected on May 8, 1995: June 30, 1995 – June 30, 2001

Senator	Party (Note: Party affiliation as of the 1995 election.)	Term	Term end
Heherson Alvarez	LDP	2	1998
Edgardo Angara	LDP	2	1998
Nikki Coseteng	NPC	2	2001
Miriam Defensor Santiago	PRP	1	2001
Franklin Drilon	Lakas	1	2001
Marcelo Fernan	LDP	1	2001
Juan Flavier	Lakas	1	2001
Neptali Gonzales	LDP	2	1998
Ernesto Herrera	LDP	2	1998
Gregorio Honasan	Independent	1	2001
Gloria Macapagal Arroyo (Note: Gloria Macapagal Arroyo resigned on June 30, 1998, upon taking office as Vice President of the Philippines.)	LDP	2	2001
Ernesto Maceda	NPC	2	1998
Ramon Magsaysay Jr.	Lakas	1	2001
Orly Mercado	LDP	2	1998
Blas Ople	LDP	1	1998
Serge Osmeña	Lakas	1	2001
Juan Ponce Enrile	Independent	1	2001
Ramon Revilla Sr.	LDP	1	1998
Raul Roco	LDP	2	2001
Alberto Romulo	LDP	2	1998
Leticia Ramos-Shahani	Lakas	2	1998
Tito Sotto	LDP	1	1998
Francisco Tatad	NPC	2	2001
Freddie Webb	LDP	1	1998

=== House of Representatives ===
Final House of Representatives composition.

Tenth Congress representation map of the Philippines

Province/City	District	Representative	Party (Note: Party affiliation at election.)	Term
Abra	Lone	Jeremias Zapata	Lakas	2
Agusan del Norte	1st	Charito Plaza	Lakas	3
Agusan del Norte	2nd	Eduardo Rama Sr.	Lakas	1
Agusan del Sur	Lone	Ceferino Paredes Jr.	Lakas	2
Aklan	Lone	Allen Quimpo	Lakas	2
Albay	1st	Edcel Lagman	LDP	3
Albay	2nd	Carlos R. Imperial	NPC	3
Albay	3rd	Romeo Salalima	NPC	1
Antique	Lone	Exequiel Javier	Lakas	3
Aurora	Lone	Bella Angara	Lakas	1
Bacolod	Lone	Romeo Guanzon	Lakas	3
Baguio	Lone	Bernardo Vergara	Lakas	2
Basilan	Lone	Candu Muarip	LDP	1
Bataan	1st	Felicito Payumo	Liberal	3
Bataan	2nd	Tet Garcia	NPC	1
Batanes	Lone	Florencio Abad	Liberal	1
Batangas	1st	Eduardo Ermita	Lakas	2
Batangas	2nd	Hernando Perez	LDP	3
Batangas	3rd	Milagros Laurel-Trinidad	NPC	3
Batangas	4th	Ralph Recto	Lakas	2
Benguet	Lone	Ronald Cosalan	Lakas	1
Biliran	Lone	Gerardo Espina Sr.	NPC	1
Bohol	1st	Venice Borja-Agana	Lakas	3
Bohol	2nd	Erico Aumentado	Lakas	2
Bohol	3rd	Isidro Zarraga	Lakas	3
Bukidnon	1st	Socorro Acosta	Lakas	3
Bukidnon	2nd	Reginaldo Tilanduca	Lakas	2
Bukidnon	3rd	Jose Maria Zubiri Jr.	Lakas	3
Bulacan	1st	Teodulo Natividad (Note: Teodulo Natividad died on January 9, 1997.)	Lakas	2
Bulacan	2nd	Pedro Pancho	Lakas	2
Bulacan	3rd	Ricardo Silverio	Lakas	2
Bulacan	4th	Angelito Sarmiento	Lakas	2
Cagayan	1st	Patricio Antonio	Lakas	1
Cagayan	2nd	Edgar Lara	NPC	2
Cagayan	3rd	Manuel Mamba	Lakas	1
Cagayan de Oro	Lone	Erasmo Damasing	PDP–Laban	2
Caloocan	1st	Bobby Guanzon	Lakas	1
Caloocan	2nd	Luis Asistio	NPC	2
Camarines Norte	Lone	Emmanuel Pimentel	NPC	2
Camarines Sur	1st	Rolando Andaya	Lakas	3
Camarines Sur	2nd	Leopoldo San Buenaventura	PDP–Laban	1
Camarines Sur	3rd	Arnulfo Fuentebella	NPC	2
Camarines Sur	4th	Ciriaco Alfelor	Liberal	3
Camiguin	Lone	Pedro Romualdo	Lakas	3
Capiz	1st	Mar Roxas	Liberal	1
Capiz	2nd	Vicente Andaya Jr.	Lakas	2
Catanduanes	Lone	Leandro Verceles Jr.	Lakas	2
Cavite	1st	Plaridel Abaya	NPC	1
Cavite	2nd	Renato Dragon	LDP	3
Cavite	3rd	Telesforo Unas	LDP	2
Cebu	1st	Eduardo Gullas	Lakas	2
Cebu	2nd	Crisologo Abines	Lakas	3
Cebu	3rd	John Henry Osmeña	LDP	1
Cebu	4th	Celestino Martinez Jr.	NPC	3
Cebu	5th	Ramon Durano III	Lakas	3
Cebu	6th	Nerissa Soon-Ruiz	Lakas	2
Cebu City	1st	Raul del Mar	Lakas	3
Cebu City	2nd	Antonio Cuenco	Lakas	3
Cotabato	1st	Anthony Dequiña	NPC	2
Cotabato	2nd	Gregorio Andolana	Lakas	3
Davao City	1st	Prospero Nograles	Independent	1
Davao City	2nd	Manuel Garcia	Lakas	2
Davao City	3rd	Elias Lopez (Note: Elias Lopez died in September 25, 1997.)	NPC	2
Davao del Norte	1st	Rogelio Sarmiento	Lakas	2
Davao del Norte	2nd	Baltazar Sator	Lakas	3
Davao del Norte	3rd	Rodolfo del Rosario	Lakas	3
Davao del Sur	1st	Alejandro Almendras Jr.	Lakas	1
Davao del Sur	2nd	Benjamin Bautista Sr.	Lakas	3
Davao Oriental	1st	Maria Elena Palma-Gil	Lakas	2
Davao Oriental	2nd	Thelma Almario	Lakas	3
Eastern Samar	Lone	Jose Ramirez	Lakas	3
Guimaras	Lone	Catalino Nava (Note: Catalino Nava died on December 3, 1995.)	Lakas	1
Ifugao	Lone	Benjamin Cappleman	NPC	2
Ilocos Norte	1st	Roque Ablan Jr.	Lakas	3
Ilocos Norte	2nd	Simeon Valdez	Lakas	1
Ilocos Sur	1st	Mariano Tajon	Lakas	2
Ilocos Sur	2nd	Eric Singson	Lakas	3
Iloilo	1st	Oscar Garin	Lakas	3
Iloilo	2nd	Alberto Lopez	Lakas	3
Iloilo	3rd	Licurgo Tirador	Lakas	3
Iloilo	4th	Narciso Monfort	LDP	1
Iloilo	5th	Niel Tupas Sr.	Lakas	3
Iloilo City	Lone	Raul M. Gonzalez	Nacionalista	1
Isabela	1st	Rodolfo Albano Jr.	Lakas	3
Isabela	2nd	Faustino Dy Jr.	Lakas	2
Isabela	3rd	Santiago Respicio	Lakas	3
Isabela	4th	Antonio Abaya	NPC	3
Kalinga-Apayao	Lone	Elias Bulut	Lakas	2
La Union	1st	Victor Francisco Ortega	Lakas	3
La Union	2nd	Jose Aspiras	Lakas	3
Laguna	1st	Nereo Joaquin	LDP	1
Laguna	2nd	Jun Chipeco	LDP	1
Laguna	3rd	Florante Aquino	Lakas	3
Laguna	4th	Magdaleno Palacol Sr. (Note: Magdaleno Palacol Sr. died on August 21, 1997.)	Lakas	3
Lanao del Norte	1st	Mariano Badelles	Lakas	3
Lanao del Norte	2nd	Abdullah Mangotara	Independent	1
Lanao del Sur	1st	Mamintal Adiong Sr.	Lakas	2
Lanao del Sur	2nd	Pangalian Balindong	Lakas	1
Las Piñas–Muntinlupa	Lone	Manny Villar	Lakas	2
Leyte	1st	Imelda Marcos	KBL	1
Leyte	2nd	Sergio Apostol	Lakas	2
Leyte	3rd	Alberto Veloso	Lakas	3
Leyte	4th	Carmelo Locsin	Lakas	3
Leyte	5th	Eriberto Loreto	Lakas	3
Maguindanao	1st	Didagen Dilangalen	NPC	1
Maguindanao	2nd	Simeon Datumanong	Lakas	2
Makati	1st	Joker Arroyo	Independent	2
Makati	2nd	Vacant (Note: Butz Aquino (LDP) received the most number of votes in the election, but was disqualified by the Commission on Elections on June 2, 1995.)	—	—
Malabon–Navotas	Lone	Tessie Aquino-Oreta	LDP	3
Mandaluyong	Lone	Neptali Gonzales II	Lakas	1
Manila	1st	Martin Isidro	LDP	3
Manila	2nd	Jaime Lopez	Lakas	3
Manila	3rd	Leonardo Fugoso	Liberal	3
Manila	4th	Ramon Bagatsing Jr.	LDP	3
Manila	5th	Amado Bagatsing	LDP	3
Manila	6th	Rosenda Ann Ocampo	NPC	2
Marikina	Lone	Romeo Candazo	Liberal	2
Marinduque	Lone	Carmencita Reyes	Lakas	3
Masbate	1st	Vida Espinosa	Lakas	1
Masbate	2nd	Luz Cleta Bakunawa	Lakas	3
Masbate	3rd	Fausto Seachon Jr.	INA	1
Misamis Occidental	1st	Percival Catane	Lakas	2
Misamis Occidental	2nd	Herminia Ramiro	Lakas	1
Misamis Oriental	1st	Homobono Cesar	Lakas	2
Misamis Oriental	2nd	Victorico Chaves	Lakas	3
Mountain Province	Lone	Victor Dominguez	Lakas	3
Negros Occidental	1st	Jules Ledesma	Lakas	1
Negros Occidental	2nd	Alfredo Marañon	Lakas	1
Negros Occidental	3rd	Jose Carlos Lacson	Lakas	3
Negros Occidental	4th	Edward Matti	NPC	3
Negros Occidental	5th	Mariano Yulo	NPC	3
Negros Occidental	6th	Genaro Alvarez Jr.	NPC	1
Negros Oriental	1st	Jerome Paras	Lakas	3
Negros Oriental	2nd	Miguel Romero	Lakas	3
Negros Oriental	3rd	Margarito Teves	LDP	3
Northern Samar	1st	Raul Daza	Liberal	3
Northern Samar	2nd	Wilmar Lucero	Liberal	2
Nueva Ecija	1st	Renato Diaz	Lakas	2
Nueva Ecija	2nd	Eleuterio Violago	Lakas	2
Nueva Ecija	3rd	Pacifico Fajardo	Lakas	2
Nueva Ecija	4th	Julita Lorenzo-Villareal	LDP	1
Nueva Vizcaya	Lone	Carlos Padilla	LDP	1
Occidental Mindoro	Lone	Jose T. Villarosa	Lakas	2
Oriental Mindoro	1st	Renato Leviste	Lakas	2
Oriental Mindoro	2nd	Jesus Punzalan	Lakas	3
Palawan	1st	Vicente Sandoval	Lakas	1
Palawan	2nd	Alfredo Abueg Jr.	Lakas	2
Pampanga	1st	Carmelo Lazatin Sr.	Lakas	3
Pampanga	2nd	Zenaida Cruz-Ducut	NPC	1
Pampanga	3rd	Oscar Samson Rodriguez	LDP	1
Pampanga	4th	Emigdio Bondoc (Note: Emigdio Bondoc died on November 25, 1997.)	Lakas	2
Pangasinan	1st	Hernani Braganza	Independent	1
Pangasinan	2nd	Antonio Bengson III	LDP	1
Pangasinan	3rd	Eric Galo Acuña	Lakas	2
Pangasinan	4th	Jose de Venecia Jr.	Lakas	3
Pangasinan	5th	Amadeo Perez Jr.	Lakas	2
Pangasinan	6th	Ranjit Shahani	Lakas	1
Parañaque	Lone	Roilo Golez	Lakas	2
Pasay	Lone	Jovito Claudio	Lakas	2
Pasig	Lone	Rufino Javier	NPC	3
Quezon	1st	Wilfrido Enverga	Lakas	3
Quezon	2nd	Marcial Punzalan Jr.	Lakas	2
Quezon	3rd	Danilo Suarez	Lakas	2
Quezon	4th	Wigberto Tañada	Liberal	1
Quezon City	1st	Reynaldo Calalay	PMP	1
Quezon City	2nd	Dante Liban	Lakas	2
Quezon City	3rd	Mike Defensor	Liberal	1
Quezon City	4th	Feliciano Belmonte Jr.	Lakas	2
Quirino	Lone	Junie Cua	Lakas	2
Rizal	1st	Gilberto Duavit Sr.	NPC	2
Rizal	2nd	Emigdio Tanjuatco Jr.	Lakas	3
Romblon	Lone	Eleandro Jesus Madrona	Lakas	2
Samar	1st	Rodolfo Tuazon	Lakas	2
Samar	2nd	Catalino Figueroa	Lakas	2
San Juan	Lone	Ronaldo Zamora	NPC	3
Sarangani	Lone	James Chiongbian	Lakas	3
Siquijor	Lone	Orlando Fua	Lakas	3
Sorsogon	1st	Salvador Escudero (Note: Salvador Escudero resigned on January 31, 1996, upon being appointed as Secretary of Agriculture.)	Lakas	3
Sorsogon	2nd	Bonifacio Gillego	Lakas	3
South Cotabato	1st	Luwalhati Antonino	Lakas	2
South Cotabato	2nd	Daisy Avance Fuentes	NPC	2
Southern Leyte	Lone	Roger Mercado	Lakas	3
Sultan Kudarat	Lone	Angelo Montilla	Lakas	1
Sulu	1st	Bensaudi Tulawie	Lakas	2
Sulu	2nd	Asani Tammang	Lakas	2
Surigao del Norte	1st	Constantino Navarro Jr.	Lakas	1
Surigao del Norte	2nd	Robert Barbers (Note: Robert Barbers resigned on April 15, 1996, upon being appointed as Secretary of the Interior and Local Government.)	Lakas	2
Surigao del Sur	1st	Mario Ty	Lakas	3
Surigao del Sur	2nd	Jesnar Falcon	Lakas	1
Taguig–Pateros	Lone	Dante Tiñga	Lakas	3
Tarlac	1st	Peping Cojuangco	LDP	3
Tarlac	2nd	Jose Yap	Lakas	3
Tarlac	3rd	Herminio Aquino	LDP	3
Tawi-Tawi	Lone	Nur Jaafar	Lakas	2
Valenzuela	Lone	Antonio Serapio	NPC	3
Zambales	1st	James Gordon Jr.	Nacionalista	1
Zambales	2nd	Antonio Diaz	Lakas	2
Zamboanga City	Lone	Maria Clara Lobregat	LDP	3
Zamboanga del Norte	1st	Romeo Jalosjos Sr.	Independent	1
Zamboanga del Norte	2nd	Cresente Llorente Jr.	NPC	1
Zamboanga del Norte	3rd	Angel Carloto	Lakas	3
Zamboanga del Sur	1st	Alejandro Urro	Lakas	2
Zamboanga del Sur	2nd	Antonio Cerilles	NPC	3
Zamboanga del Sur	3rd	Belma Cabilao	Lakas	2
Cultural Minorities		Ronald Adamat	Nonpartisan	1
Labor		Isidro Aligada	Nonpartisan	1
Labor		Temistocles Dejon Sr.	Nonpartisan	2
Labor		Gregorio del Prado	Nonpartisan	1
Labor		Zoilo dela Cruz	Nonpartisan	2
Labor		Andres Dinglasan Jr. (Note: Andres Dinglasan Jr. died on August 9, 1997.)	Nonpartisan	2
Labor		Mohammad Omar Fajardo	Nonpartisan	1
Labor		Ramon Jabar	Nonpartisan	3
Labor		Ernesto Verceles	Nonpartisan	2
Labor		Alejandro Villavisa	Nonpartisan	3
Peasant		Adolfo Geronimo	Nonpartisan	1
Peasant		Leonardo Montemayor	Nonpartisan	2
Peasant		Arturo Olegario Jr.	Nonpartisan	1
Peasant		Vicente Tagle	Nonpartisan	2
Peasant		Glicerio Tan	Nonpartisan	1
Urban Poor		Florante Tarona	Nonpartisan	1
Urban Poor		Ariel Zartiga	Nonpartisan	2
Women		Minerva Laudico	Nonpartisan	2
Women		Leonor Ines Luciano	Nonpartisan	1
Youth		Edgardo Avila	Nonpartisan	2
Youth		Felizardo Colambo	Nonpartisan	1
Youth		Anna Periquet	Nonpartisan	1

== See also ==
- Congress of the Philippines
- Senate of the Philippines
- House of Representatives of the Philippines
- 1995 Philippine general election
