= Pammy Zamora =

Filipino politician (born 1988)

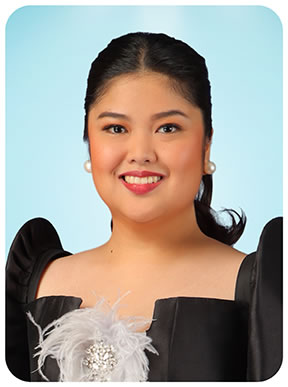
- Official portrait, 2022

Assistant Majority Floor Leader of the House of Representatives of the Philippines
- In office July 25, 2022 – June 30, 2025
- Leader: Mannix Dalipe

Member of the Philippine House of Representatives from Taguig-Pateros's 2nd congressional district
- In office June 30, 2022 – June 30, 2025
- Preceded by: Lani Cayetano
- Succeeded by: Jorge Daniel Bocobo

Member of the Taguig City Council from the 2nd District
- In office June 30, 2013 – June 30, 2022

Personal details
- Born: Amparo Maria Jorge Zamora; June 13, 1988 (age 38) Mandaluyong, Philippines
- Party: Lakas (2024–present)
- Other political affiliations: Nacionalista (2012–2024)
- Relations: Francis Zamora (half-brother); Ysabel Zamora (sister)
- Parent: Ronaldo Zamora (father)
- Education: University of Asia and the Pacific (BA)
- Occupation: Politician

Amparo Maria "Pammy" Jorge Zamora (born June 13, 1988) is a Filipino politician who served as the representative for Taguig–Pateros's second district from 2022 until 2025.

== Early life and education ==
Amparo Maria Jorge Zamora was born on June 13, 1988. She is the daughter of former Executive Secretary Ronaldo Zamora. Her family constitutes a political dynasty based in San Juan, with her father having served as a representative of its lone congressional district, half-brother Francis Zamora as the mayor, and her older sister Bel as a representative.

She graduated at the University of Asia and the Pacific, earning a Bachelor of Arts majoring in humanities.

== Political career ==
Zamora served as a city councilor of Taguig from 2013 to 2022, representing the second district.

Zamora was elected as the representative for Taguig–Pateros's second district in 2022, succeeding Lani Cayetano. As a neophyte at the 19th Congress, she is a part of the "Young Guns" bloc in the Congress, notable for their close relationship with Speaker Martin Romualdez. She left the Nacionalista Party for Lakas–CMD ahead of the 2025 elections. She ran for reelection in the same election but lost to councilor Jorge Daniel Bocobo, who was a sectoral representative as Taguig's Association of Barangay Captains (ABC) President.
