= Ronaldo Zamora =

Philippine politician

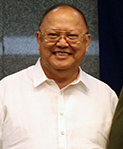
- Ronaldo Zamora during the CA’s plenary session Wednesday, September 21, 2016.

Member of the Philippine House of Representatives
- In office June 30, 2013 – June 30, 2022
- Preceded by: JV Ejercito
- Succeeded by: Bel Zamora
- Constituency: San Juan
- In office June 30, 2001 – June 30, 2010
- Preceded by: Jose Mari Gonzales
- Succeeded by: JV Ejercito
- Constituency: San Juan
- In office June 30, 1995 – June 30, 1998
- Preceded by: office created
- Succeeded by: Jose Mari Gonzales
- Constituency: San Juan
- In office June 30, 1987 – June 30, 1995
- Preceded by: Neptali Gonzales
- Succeeded by: District abolished
- Constituency: San Juan–Mandaluyong
House positions
House Majority Leader
In office July 27, 1992 – June 9, 1995
Preceded by	Francisco Sumulong
Succeeded by	Rodolfo Albano Jr.
House Minority Leader
In office July 22, 2013 – June 30, 2016
Preceded by	Edcel Lagman
Succeeded by	Danilo Suarez
In office July 23, 2007 – June 30, 2010
Preceded by	Francis Escudero
Succeeded by	Edcel Lagman
In office July 24, 1995 – June 30, 1998
Preceded by	Hernando Perez
Succeeded by	Feliciano Belmonte Jr.

31st Executive Secretary of the Philippines
- In office July 1, 1998 – December 31, 2000
- President: Joseph Estrada
- Preceded by: Alexander Aguirre
- Succeeded by: Edgardo Angara

Member of the Interim Batasang Pambansa from Region IV
- In office June 12, 1978 – June 30, 1984

Personal details
- Born: Ronaldo Bayan Zamora; December 4, 1944 (age 81) City of Greater Manila, Commonwealth of the Philippines
- Party: PDP (2016–present); Partido Magdiwang (local party; 2012–present)
- Other political affiliations: UNA (2012–2015); Nacionalista (2007–2012, 2015–2016); PMP (1998–2007); NPC (1995–1998); LDP (1992–1995); Independent (1987–1992); KBL (1978–1987)
- Spouse: Rosemarie Manlapit
- Children: Francis; Ysabel Maria; Consuelo Maria (deceased); Amparo Maria
- Parents: Manuel Zamora Sr. (father); Amparo Bayan (mother)
- Education: University of the Philippines Diliman (BA, LL.B)
- Occupation: Lawyer
- Profession: Politician

Ronaldo "Ronny" Bayan Zamora (born December 4, 1944) is a Filipino lawyer and politician who served as representative of the lone district of San Juan for 21 non-consecutive years beginning in 1995. He previously served as representative of San Juan–Mandaluyong from 1987 to 1995, as well as assemblyman for the Metro Manila (Region IV) from 1978 to 1984 at the Interim Batasang Pambansa.

He topped the bar exams in 1969 and was among the Ten Outstanding Young Men of the Philippines in 1972. He is also a Senior Partner of Zamora Poblador Vasquez & Bretaña Law Offices.

Zamora held various cabinet positions throughout the presidency of Ferdinand Marcos, and had served as his Assistant Executive Secretary from 1972 to 1975 and as his Presidential Assistant for Legal Affairs from 1975 to 1978. In August 1982, Zamora was appointed by president Marcos to the National Executive Committee to represent the youth sector. He later served as President Joseph Estrada's Executive Secretary from 1998 to 2000.

Zamora is the father of San Juan Mayor Francis Zamora, Representative Bel Zamora of San Juan, and Representative Pammy Zamora of Taguig–Pateros's 2nd district.

== Early life ==
Ronaldo Zamora was born on December 4, 1944, in Manila, Philippines to Manuel G. Zamora Sr., a Malacañang protocol officer from the 1930s to the 1960s, and Amparo Bayan Zamora. His brothers are Manuel "Manny" Zamora Jr. and Salvador "Buddy" Zamora.

Zamora received his elementary and secondary education at De La Salle College (now De La Salle University). He then enrolled at University of Philippines Diliman, where he obtained his bachelor's degree in political science in 1965 and Bachelor of Laws in 1969, both as magna cum laude. He was the topnotcher of the bar exams in 1969.

== Political career ==
Zamora joined politics during the administration of Ferdinand Marcos at the Presidential Economic Staff, as the chief economist from 1966 to 1967, senior information officer from 1967 to 1970, Technical Assistant Staff Service Unit from 1970 to 1972. He later served under the Office of the President as Acting Assistant Executive Secretary from 1972 to 1974, Assistant Executive Secretary from 1974 to 1975, and Presidential Assistant for Legal Affairs from 1975 to 1978.

Zamora was first elected into public office in 1978 together with Imelda Marcos and 19 other candidates of the administration coalition Kilusang Bagong Lipunan as parliament members from Metro Manila (designated as Region IV). By 1982, Zamora was appointed by president Marcos to the National Executive Committee to represent the youth sector, concurrent to his position as assemblyman. In 1984, when the constituency in the Batasang Pambansa was modified—to elect members by province and cities, instead of regions—Zamora ran for the parliamentary seat for San Juan–Mandaluyong but lost to opposition candidate Neptali Gonzales.

When Congress was restored under a new constitution in 1987, he ran and was elected representative of the lone district of San Juan–Mandaluyong in 1987 and 1992, and as representative of the lone district of San Juan in 1995. He was also elected as House Minority Floor Leader during the 10th Congress of the Philippines.

Barred from seeking another term in 1998, Zamora helped his long-time political ally and townsmate Joseph Estrada in his presidential bid in 1998. Estrada later appointed Zamora as his Executive Secretary. Concurrent to president Estrada's impeachment trial, Zamora resigned from Estrada's cabinet in late December 2000 to run for representative of San Juan again in 2001, although he clarified that it was not done to abandon Estrada. He would be reelected again in 2004 and in 2007, for three terms. In the 14th Congress (2007–2010), Zamora was also elected as House Minority Floor Leader.

After stepping down from Congress upon being term-limited in 2010, Zamora served as a member of the Board of Directors of Nickel Asia Corporation, a mining company founded by his brother Manuel Jr., from 2011 to his retirement from the company in 2013. He also served as Chairman of the Rio Tuba Nickel Mining Corporation and later of Cagdianao Mining Corporation, subsidiaries of Nickel Asia Corporation.

In 2013, Zamora was elected as representative of San Juan. He served as House Minority Leader for the third time in the 16th Congress of the Philippines. He was re-elected in 2016 and 2019. He would retire from politics at the end of his term in 2022, according to his son Francis, who was elected Mayor of San Juan in 2019. He was succeeded by his daughter, Bel Zamora; his other daughter, Pammy Zamora, also assumed office as representative of Taguig's 2nd district on the same year.

== Personal life ==
Zamora is married to Rosemarie "Rose" Manlapit, and they have two children: Consuelo Maria (1970–2008) and Francisco Javier ("Francis", born 1977). Zamora also had two children with Mimi Jorge: Ysabel Maria ("Bel", born 1983) and Amparo Maria ("Pammy", born 1988).
