= Victorico Chaves =

Philippine politician

Victorico L. Chaves
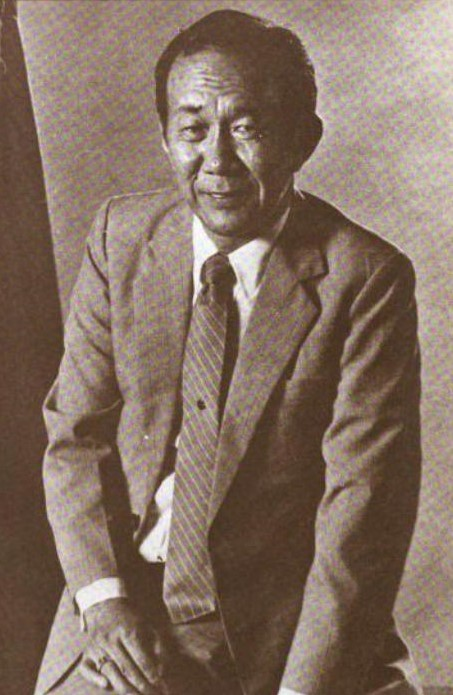

Member of the Philippine House of Representatives from Misamis Oriental's Second District
- In office 1987–1998
- Succeeded by: Augusto H. Baculio

President of the Philippine Amateur Volleyball Association
- In office 1986–1995

Personal details
- Born: 1932 or 1933
- Died: February 18, 2016 (aged 83) Taguig, Metro Manila, Philippines
- Party: Lakas-CMD (1995-2016)
- Other political affiliations: LDP (1992-1995); PDP-Laban (1987-1992)

Victorico Lim Chaves, also known as "Concoy" (b. 1932/1933 – February 18, 2016) was a Filipino sportsman and politician. He served as an assistant majority floor leader and representative of the 2nd district of Misamis Oriental for three consecutive terms (1987–1992, 1992–1995, 1995–1998) and also served as the president of the Philippine Amateur Volleyball Association (PAVA, later renamed as the Philippine Volleyball Federation in 2006) from 1986 to 1995. He is also a co-author of a house bill seeking for the creation of the Philippine Sports Commission enacted into law in 1990.

He died on February 18, 2016, at the St. Luke's Medical Center in Taguig, citing his lung complications.

== Sports career ==
In 1986, he was appointed as the president of the Philippine Amateur Volleyball Association, then the country's local governing body for the sport of Volleyball. Chaves is also known for having spend his personal expenses to support the projects and initiatives of PAVA. At the peak of his career, Concoy contributed to the eventual growth of Philippine volleyball in the 1980s and 1990s including a victorious run of the Philippines men's national volleyball team in an international tourney in Kuching, Malaysia, the Manila hosting of the FIVB World Grand Prix in 1995, and the last gold medal of the Philippines women's national volleyball team in the Southeast Asian Games held in Singapore in 1993. Aside from his PAVA presidency, he is also elected as the president of the Southeast Asian Volleyball Federation.

During the 1988 POC elections, Chaves was one of the top contenders for the presidency of the local olympic body, but later reported that he declined to run for POC president, leaving Jose Sering (later won) and Joey Romasanta as the contenders in the race.

Chaves was also the chairman of the POC's election committee having supervised the voting of the new POC officials in the 2008 and 2012 elections. The election committee also composed of Ricky Palou of Ateneo (who also served as the secretary-general of LVPI) and Fr. Bernie Oca of La Salle.

In 2015, he was elected as the chairman of the newly formed volleyball NSA, Larong Volleyball sa Pilipinas, Inc. (LVPI) despite his complications with his right lung.
