= Legislative districts of San Juan =

Legislative districts in the Philippines

The legislative districts of San Juan are the representations of the highly urbanized city of San Juan in the Congress of the Philippines. The city is represented in the lower house of the Congress through its lone congressional district.

== History ==
San Juan, formerly known as San Juan del Monte, was initially represented as part of the at-large district of the province of Manila in the Malolos Congress from 1898 to 1899. The then-town was later incorporated to the province of Rizal, established in 1901, and was represented as part of the first district of Rizal from 1907 to 1941 and from 1945 to 1972. When the then-town was merged to form the City of Greater Manila during World War II, it was represented as part of the at-large district of Manila from 1943 to 1944. San Juan was separated from Rizal on November 7, 1975 by virtue of Presidential Decree No. 824, and was represented in the Interim Batasang Pambansa along with other Metropolitan Manila municipalities and cities as part of Region IV from 1978 to 1984.

San Juan was grouped with Mandaluyong from 1984 to 1995 for representation in the Regular Batasang Pambansa and the restored House of Representatives, as the Legislative district of San Juan–Mandaluyong. The two were separated and granted their own representations in Congress by virtue of section 49 of Mandaluyong's city charter (Republic Act No. 7675) which was approved on February 9, 1994, and ratified on April 10, 1994.

== Legislative Districts and Congressional Representatives ==
Lakas–CMD (1)

Legislative Districts and Congressional Representatives of San Juan
District	Current Representative	Barangays	Population (2020)
Lone	Ysabel Maria Zamora (since 2022); Addition Hills	List: Addition Hills; Balong–Bato; Batis; Corazón de Jesús; Ermitaño; Greenhills; Halo-halo (Saint Joseph); Isabelita; Kabayanan; Little Baguio; Maytunas; Onse; Pasadena; Pedro Cruz; Progreso; Rivera; Salapán; San Perfecto; Santa Lucia; Tibagan; West Crame	126,347
