= Hernando Perez =

Filipino lawyer and academic

The Honorable Hernando Perez
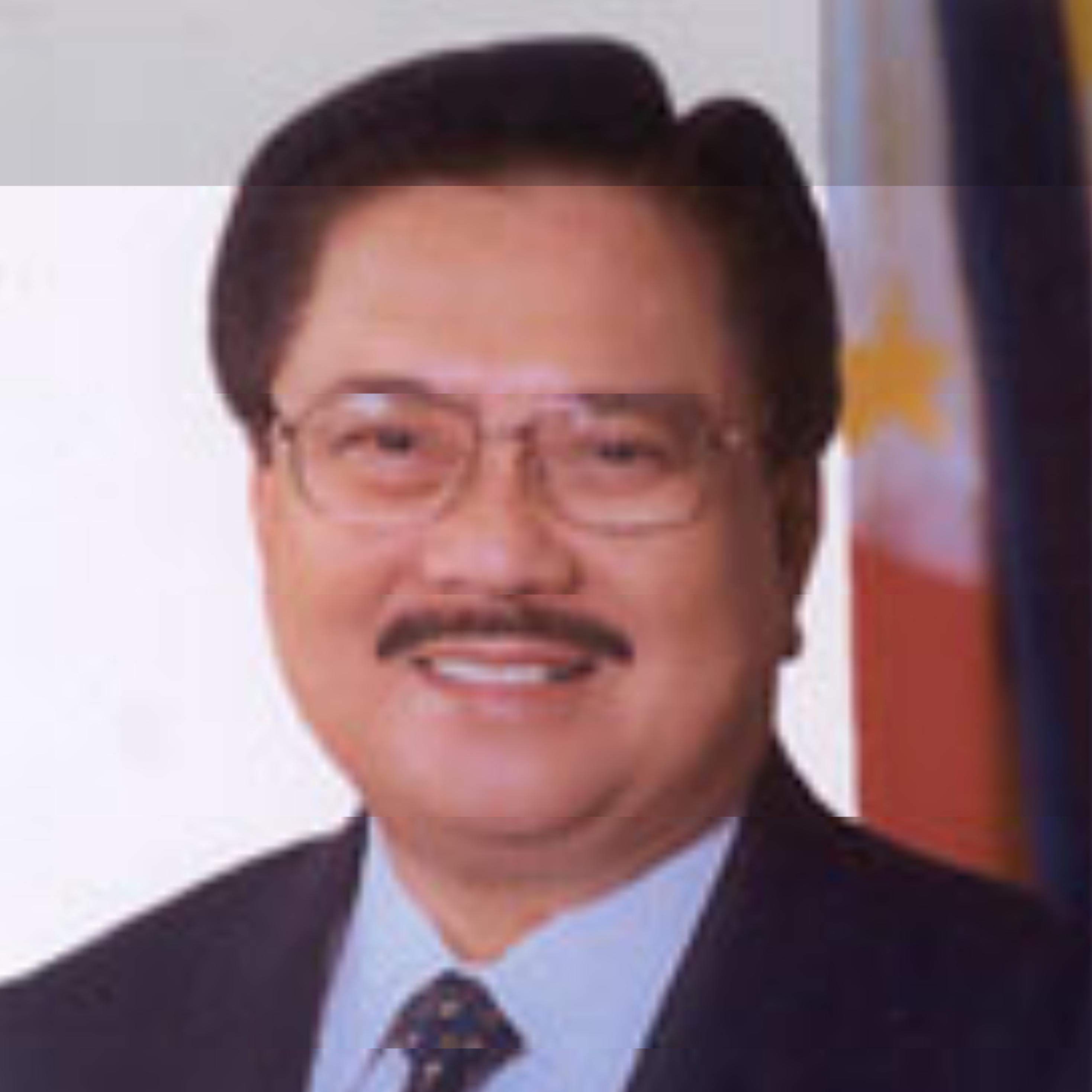
- Department of Justice Portrait of Perez (2002)

President Emeritus of the University of Batangas
- Incumbent
- Assumed office September 2023
- Preceded by: Position established

President of the University of Batangas
- In office April 2007 – September 2023
- Preceded by: Abelardo Perez
- Succeeded by: Lily Marlene Hernandez

Deputy House Speaker
- In office July 24, 1995 – June 30, 1998
- Speaker: Jose de Venecia Jr.

House Minority Leader
- In office July 27, 1992 – June 9, 1995
- Preceded by: Victor Ortega
- Succeeded by: Ronaldo Zamora

51st Secretary of Justice
- In office January 24, 2001 – January 2, 2003
- President: Gloria Macapagal Arroyo
- Preceded by: Artemio Tuquero
- Succeeded by: Merceditas Gutierrez (acting)

Secretary of Transportation and Communications Minister of Transportation and Communications (February 25–March 25, 1986)
- In office February 25, 1986 – March 16, 1987
- President: Corazon Aquino
- Prime Minister: Salvador Laurel (1986)
- Preceded by: Jose P. Dans
- Succeeded by: Rainerio Reyes

Member of the House of Representatives from Batangas's 2nd district
- In office June 30, 1987 – June 30, 1998
- Preceded by: District re-created
- Succeeded by: Edgar L. Mendoza

Mambabatas Pambansa (Assemblyman) from Batangas
- In office June 30, 1984 – March 25, 1986 Serving with Manuel Collantes, Jose Laurel Jr. and Rafael Recto

Member of Batangas Provincial Board from 2nd district
- In office 1980–1984

Personal details
- Born: Hernando Benito Perez; September 27, 1939 (age 86) Batangas, Philippines
- Party: Independent (1998–present)
- Other political affiliations: Nacionalista (1980–1987); UNIDO (until 1987); LDP (1988–1992); LnB (1987–1992); Lakas (1992–1998)
- Education: Western Philippine Colleges (BS); Ateneo de Manila University (LL.B.) (MBA)
- Occupation: University executive
- Profession: Lawyer

Hernando Benito Perez (locally [ɛr'nando 'peɾes]; born September 27, 1939), also known as Nani Perez and colloquially as Nani, is a Filipino lawyer, academic, and a former politician who is previously served in the Arroyo administration as the Secretary of Justice, and as the Secretary of Transportation and Communications under former President Corazon Aquino.

Currently, he serves as the President Emeritus of the University of Batangas.

== Life and education ==
Perez was born on 1939 in Batangas. He studied law at Ateneo de Manila University and was admitted to the bar in 1962.

== Career ==
=== Political career ===
==== Provincial politics (1980-1984) ====
Perez is a lawyer by profession, but is a law professor. He was elected and became a member of the Batangas Provincial Board from 1980 to 1984.

==== Regular Batasang Pambansa (1984-1986) ====
After his tenure on the Batangas Provincial Board expired in 1984. He served as Mambabatas Pambansa from June 1984 until March 1986, when Corazon Aquino became the president in February 1986 and the provisional government was put into place in March 1986.

==== Transportation department (1986-1987) ====
He served as Minister of Transportation and Communications after President Corazon Aquino succeeded President Ferdinand Marcos through EDSA Revolution.

==== Congress (1987-1998) ====
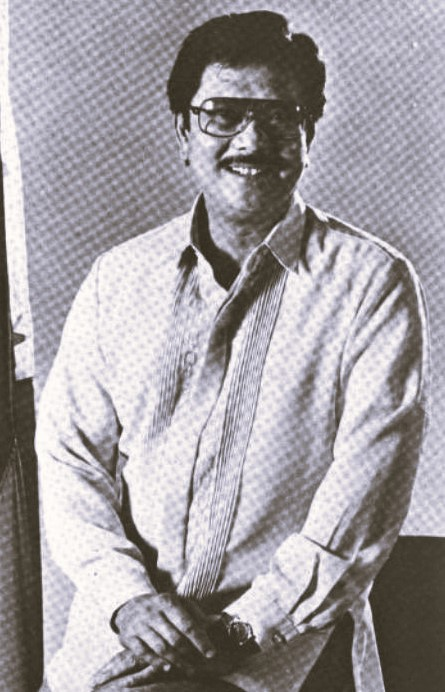
Perez official portrait during the 8th Congress.

After his stint as secretary, Perez ran for Congress, then eventually won. From 1987 to 1998, He became the minority leader and have served as deputy speaker until his term end.

==== Justice department (2001-2003) ====
After President Joseph Estrada was overthrown by his own Vice President Gloria Macapagal-Arroyo through EDSA II. Perez was appointed as Secretary of Justice and served from 2001 to 2003. During his stint as justice secretary, the former head of the Commission on Audit and former Solicitor General Jose Calida served as undersecretary to him.

=== Post political career (2003-present) ===
==== President of the University of Batangas ====
In 2007, he took over as president of the university until his brother Abelardo Perez's demise. His brother served in this capacity until his death on April 18, 2007.

==== Attempts to return to the House of Representatives ====
In 2016, Perez ran for representative of the newly created 5th district. He placed third and lost to then-board member Marvey Mariño, garnering 15,951 votes (10.52% of the total votes).

==== President Emeritus of the University of Batangas ====
In 2023, he resigned as the University President in favor of his successor Lily Marlene Hernandez-Bohn. Perez became the President Emeritus, while maintaining his membership in the board of regents.

== See also ==
- University of Batangas
