= Bel Zamora =

Filipino politician (born 1983)

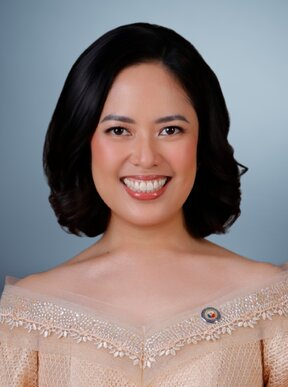
- Official portrait, 2026

Member of the Philippine House of Representatives from San Juan's at-large congressional district
- Incumbent
- Assumed office June 30, 2022
- Preceded by: Ronaldo Zamora

Personal details
- Born: Ysabel Maria Jorge Zamora; June 8, 1983 (age 43) Santa Mesa, Manila, Philippines
- Party: Lakas (2024–present)
- Other political affiliations: PDP (2021–2024)
- Spouse: Ryan Rene Jornada
- Relations: Francis Zamora (half-brother); Amparo Zamora (sister)
- Children: 1
- Parent: Ronaldo Zamora (father)
- Education: University of the Philippines Diliman
- Occupation: Politician
- Profession: Lawyer

Ysabel Maria "Bel" Jorge Zamora-Jornada (born June 8, 1983) is a Filipino lawyer and politician who has served as the representative of the Lone District of the City San Juan since 2022, as a member of Lakas–CMD.

The daughter of Ronaldo Zamora, she studied Political Science and graduated as Cum Laude at the University of the Philippines Diliman Before being elected to Congress, she worked at the Zamora and Poblador Law Offices and held senior roles at the district office of her father during his congressional tenure.

== Early life and career ==
Zamora was born on June 8, 1983, in Santa Mesa, Manila. She is the daughter of politician Ronaldo Zamora, who was a member of the Interim Batasang Pambansa at the time of her birth. Her family is active in the local politics of San Juan. Her father went on to serve as a representative; her half-brother Francis was elected mayor in 2019; and her younger sister Pammy was elected to serve as the representative of Taguig's second district from 2022 to 2025.

She studied political science at the University of the Philippines Diliman, where she obtained an undergraduate degree in 2003. She pursued a Juris Doctor in the same institution and was admitted to the Philippine Bar in 2009. After graduating, Zamora worked as a partner at Zamora and Poblador Law Offices. Her focus was civil and family law, corporate law, and criminal law. She also headed her father's district office during his tenure as a representative.

== House of Representatives ==
Zamora ran for representative in San Juan's at-large district during the 2022 election. Running under the ruling PDP–Laban, she sought to succeed her father, who was term-limited and intended to retire from politics. She was elected, defeating outgoing Councilor Jana Ejercito Atty. Bel was sworn in as a representative on June 30, 2022.

In September 2024, she joined Lakas–CMD ahead of her 2025 reelection bid. She was re-elected in 2025.

== Personal life ==
Zamora is married to fellow lawyer Ryan Rene Jornada, with whom she has a son.
