= San Juan's at-large congressional district =

Legislative district of the Philippines

- Constituency for the House of Representatives of the Philippines
- Map of Metro Manila showing the location of San Juan.
- City: San Juan
- Region: Metro Manila
- Population: 126,347 (2020)
- Electorate: 100,639 (2025)
- Major settlements: San Juan
- Area: 5.95 km^{2} (2.30 sq mi)

Current constituency
- Created: 1994
- Representative: Bel Zamora
- Political party: Lakas–CMD
- Congressional bloc: Majority

San Juan's at-large congressional district is the congressional district of the Philippines in San Juan. It has been represented in the House of Representatives of the Philippines since 1995. Previously included in San Juan–Mandaluyong's at-large congressional district, it includes all barangays of the city. It is currently represented in the 20th Congress by Ysabel Maria J. Zamora of the Lakas–CMD.

== Representation history ==
#	Image	Member	Term of office		Congress	Party	Electoral history
#	Image	Member	Start	End	Congress	Party	Electoral history
District created February 9, 1994.
1		Ronaldo Zamora	June 30, 1995	June 30, 1998	10th	NPC	Redistricted from San Juan–Mandaluyong district and re-elected in 1995.
2		Jose Mari Gonzales	June 30, 1998	June 30, 2001	11th	LAMMP	Elected in 1998.
2		Jose Mari Gonzales	June 30, 1998	June 30, 2001	11th	Liberal	Elected in 1998.
(1)		Ronaldo Zamora	June 30, 2001	June 30, 2010	12th	PMP	Elected in 2001.
(1)		Ronaldo Zamora	June 30, 2001	June 30, 2010	13th	PMP	Re-elected in 2004.
(1)		Ronaldo Zamora	June 30, 2001	June 30, 2010	14th	Nacionalista	Re-elected in 2007.
3		JV Ejercito	June 30, 2010	June 30, 2013	15th	PMP (Magdiwang)	Elected in 2010.
(1)		Ronaldo Zamora	June 30, 2013	June 30, 2022	16th	UNA (Magdiwang)	Elected in 2013.
(1)		Ronaldo Zamora	June 30, 2013	June 30, 2022	16th	Nacionalista (Magdiwang)	Elected in 2013.
(1)		Ronaldo Zamora	June 30, 2013	June 30, 2022	17th	PDP–Laban (Magdiwang)	Re-elected in 2016.
(1)		Ronaldo Zamora	June 30, 2013	June 30, 2022	18th	PDP–Laban (Magdiwang)	Re-elected in 2019.
4		Ysabel Maria Zamora	June 30, 2022	Incumbent	19th	PDP	Elected in 2022.
4		Ysabel Maria Zamora	June 30, 2022	Incumbent	20th	Lakas	Re-elected in 2025.

== Election results ==
=== 2025 ===
Candidate	Party	Votes	%
Ysabel Zamora (incumbent)	Lakas–CMD	44,545	66.54
Jana Ejercito	Pwersa ng Masang Pilipino	22,403	33.46
Total		66,948	100.00
Valid votes		66,948	94.55
Invalid/blank votes		3,861	5.45
Total votes		70,809	100.00
Registered voters/turnout		100,639	70.36
Lakas–CMD hold			
Source: Commission on Elections

=== 2022 ===
2022 Philippine House of Representatives election in San Juan's Lone District
Party	Candidate	Votes	%
PDP–Laban	Bel Zamora	49,334	64.52
NPC	Jana Ejercito	27,133	35.48
Total votes		76,467	100.00
PDP–Laban hold			

=== 2019 ===
2019 Philippine House of Representatives election in San Juan's Lone District
Party	Candidate	Votes	%
PDP–Laban	Ronaldo Zamora (incumbent)	35,386	60.0
PMP	Edu Manzano	23,627	40.0
Valid ballots		59,013	96.3
Invalid or blank votes		2,239	3.7
Total votes		61,252	100.0
PDP–Laban hold			

=== 2016 ===
2016 Philippine House of Representatives election in San Juan's Lone district
Party	Candidate	Votes	%
Nacionalista	Ronaldo Zamora	31,172	
Independent	Jana Ejercito	22,922	
Independent	George Cordero	952	
Invalid or blank votes		3,153	
Total votes		58,199	
Nacionalista hold			

=== 2010 ===
Philippine House of Representatives election at San Juan
Party	Candidate	Votes	%
PMP	JV Ejercito	47,840	100.00
Valid ballots		47,840	82.08
Invalid or blank votes		10,444	17.92
Total votes		58,284	100.00%
PMP gain from Nacionalista			

== See also ==
- Legislative district of San Juan, Metro Manila
