= Rain or Shine Elasto Painters all-time roster =

This contains the list of players who have played for the Rain or Shine Elasto Painters from 2006 to present.

== A ==
Name	Position	College	Season entered	Left team	No. of seasons	Ref.
Hassan Adams	Guard	University of Arizona	2010-11	2011	1	
Maverick Ahanmisi	Guard	University of Minnesota	2015-16	2019	4	
Nur Jam Alfad	Guard	San Sebastian College-Recoletos	2009-10	2010	1	
Jjay Alejandro	Guard	National University	2019	2020	1	
Kwame Alexander	Forward/center	Cal State San Bernardino	2019	2019	1	
Raymond Almazan	Forward	Colegio de San Juan de Letran	2013-14	present	-	
Mark Andaya	Center	Colegio de San Juan de Letran	2008-09	2009	1	
Ryan Araña	Guard	De La Salle University-Manila	2007-08	2015	8	
Marcy Arellano	Guard	University of the East	2009-10	2011	2	
Anton Asistio	Guard	Ateneo de Manila University	2021	present	-	

== B ==
Name	Position	College	Season entered	Left team	No. of seasons	Ref.
Froilan Baguion	Guard	National University	2006-07	2008	2	
Estong Ballesteros	Forward	University of Santo Tomas	2006-07	2008	2	
Nic Belasco	Forward	College of Notre Dame of Maryland	2007-08	2008	1	
Beau Belga	Center	Philippine Christian University	2010-11	present	-	
Mark Borboran	Forward	University of the East	2016-17	present	-	
Denzel Bowles	Forward	James Madison University	2019	2019	1	
Ronjay Buenafe	Guard	Emilio Aguinaldo College	2010-11	2012	2	
Paolo Bugia	Forward	Ateneo de Manila University	2010-11	2011	1	
J'Nathan Bullock	Forward	Cleveland State University	2016-17	2017	1	

== C ==
Name	Position	College	Season entered	Left team	No. of seasons	Ref.
Junjun Cabatu	Forward	De La Salle University-Manila	2006-07	2007	1	
Andrei Caracut	Guard	De La Salle University-Manila	2021	present	-	
JK Casino	Guard	Centro Escolar University	2017-2018	2019	1	
Jeff Chan	Forward	Far Eastern University	2009-10	2017	8	
Mo Charlo	Forward	University of Nevada	2015-16	2016	1	
Wayne Chism	Forward	University of Tennessee	2014-15	2016	2	
Charles Clark III	Center	University of Mississippi	2006-07	2009	2	
Jhonard Clarito	Forward	De Ocampo Memorial College	2022-23	present	-	
Alex Compton	Guard	Cornell University	2006-07	2008	2	
Jamelle Cornley	Guard	Penn State University	2011-12	2012	1	
Duke Crews	Forward	Bowie State University	2011-12; 2016-17	2012 2017	1	
Jericho Cruz	Guard	Adamson University	2014-15	2018	4	
Jervy Cruz	Forward	University of Santo Tomas	2009-10	2015	6	

== D ==
Name	Position	College	Season entered	Left team	No. of seasons	Ref.
Ed Daquioag	Guard	University of Santo Tomas	2016-17	2020	3	
Nick Demusis	Forward	Whittier College	2022-23	present	-	
Joe Devance	Forward	University of Texas at El Paso	2007-08	2008	1	
Clint Doliguez	Guard/forward	San Beda University	2020	2021	1	
Josh Dollard	Forward	University of South Carolina Aiken	2015-16	2016	1	
Don Dulay	Guard	El Camino College	2007-08	2010	3	

== E ==
Name	Position	College	Season entered	Left team	No. of seasons	Ref.
Gherome Ejercito	Guard	Adamson University	2008-09	2009	1	
Ping Exciminiano	Guard	Far Eastern University	2019	2020	1	

== F ==
Name	Position	College	Season entered	Left team	No. of seasons	Ref.
EJ Feihl	Center	Adamson University	2006-07	2007	1	
John Ferriols	Forward	University of San Jose - Recoletos	2010-11	2011	1	
Jason Forte	Guard	The University of Southern Mississippi	2015-16	2016	1	

== G ==
Name	Position	College	Season entered	Left team	No. of seasons	Ref.
Marquise Gainous	Center	Texas Christian University	2007-08	2008	1	
Niño Gelig	Guard	University of Santo Tomas	2006-07	2008	2	
Bradwyn Guinto	Center	San Sebastian College	2021	2023	2	

== H ==
Name	Position	College	Season entered	Manner of entry	Left team	No. of seasons	Ref.
Pierre Henderson-Niles	Center	University of Memphis	2015-16	Commissioner's Cup Import	2016	1	
Michael Hrabak	Forward	Central Arizona College	2009-10	Trade	2010	1	

== I ==
Name	Position	College	Season entered	Left team	No. of seasons	Ref.
Jireh Ibañes	Forward	University of the Philippines, Diliman	2006-07	2017	10	
Shaun Ildefonso	Forward	National University	2022-23	2026	-	
Mark Isip	Forward	Far Eastern University	2007-08	2009	2	

== J ==
Name	Position	College	Season entered	Left team	No. of seasons	Ref.
Rick Jackson	Forward	Syracuse University	2014-15	2015	1	
Trevis Jackson	Guard	Sacramento State	2021	2022	1	
Chito Jaime	Forward	AMA Computer University	2011-12	2013	2	
RJ Jazul	Guard	Colegio de San Juan de Letran	2010-11	2011	1	
Franky Johnson	Guard	Warner Pacific University	2021	2021	1	
Reggie Johnson	Center	University of Miami	2017-18	2018	1	

== K ==
Name	Position	College	Season entered	Left team	No. of seasons	Ref.
Jason Keep	Center	University of San Diego	2007-08	2008	1	
Jerramy King	Guard	Cal State Long Beach	2017-18	2018	1	
Doug Kramer	Center	Ateneo de Manila University	2010-11	2011	1	

== L ==
Name	Position	College	Season entered	Left team	No. of seasons	Ref.
Gilbert Lao	Forward	University of Santo Tomas	2006-07	2007	1	
Eddie Laure	Forward	Adamson University	2008-09	2010	2	
Paul Lee	Guard	University of the East	2011-12	2016	5	
Jai Lewis	Forward	George Mason University	2008-09	2010	2	
Kayel Locke	Forward	UNC Greensboro	2019	2019	1	
Denver Lopez	Guard	California State University, Fullerton	2006-07	2009	3	
Dior Lowhorn	Forward	University of San Francisco	2015-16	2016	1	

== M ==
Name	Position	College	Season entered	Left team	No. of seasons	Ref.
Dexter Maiquez	Forward	San Sebastian College	2016-17	2020	3	
Gian Mamuyac	Guard	Ateneo de Manila University	2022-23	present	-	
Ronnie Matias	Forward	University of Manila	2010-11; 2015-16	2014; 2019	4	
Wendell McKines	Forward	New Mexico State University	2014-15	2015	1	
Alexander McLean	Forward	Liberty University	2013-14	2014	1	
Joey Mente	Guard	Lyceum of the Philippines	2006-07	2008	2	
Solomon Mercado	Guard	Far Eastern University	2008-09	2011	3	
Javee Mocon	Forward	San Beda University	2019	2022	3	
Carl Montgomery	Forward	Chicago State University	2019	2019	1	

== N ==
Name	Position	College	Season entered	Left team	No. of seasons	Ref.
Rey Nambatac	Guard	Colegio de San Juan de Letran	2017-18	present	-	
Rod Nealy	Forward	Houston Baptist University	2009-10	2010	1	
Mike Nieto	Forward	Ateneo de Manila University	2021	present	-	
Josan Nimes	Guard	Mapua Institute of Technology	2015-16	2016	1	
Gabe Norwood	Forward	George Mason University	2008-09	present	-	
Alex Nuyles	Guard	Adamson University	2013-14	2014	1	

== O ==
Name	Position	College	Season entered	Left team	No. of seasons	Ref.
Sidney Onwubere	Forward	Emilio Aguinaldo College	2017-18	2020	3	

== P ==
Name	Position	College	Season entered	Left team	No. of seasons	Ref.
Ryan Pearson	Forward	George Mason	2022-23		1	
Jewel Ponferada	Forward/center	National University	2015-16	present	-	

== Q ==
Name	Position	College	Season entered	Left team	No. of seasons	Ref.
Michael Qualls	Guard	Arkansas	2022-23	present	-	
J.R. Quiñahan	Forward	University of Visayas	2011-12	2016	5	

== R ==
Name	Position	College	Season entered	Left team	No. of seasons	Ref.
Arizona Reid	Forward	High Point University	2010-11	2014	3	
Jay-R Reyes	Center	UP Diliman	2006-07	2011	5	
Prince Rivero	Forward	De La Salle University	2021	2022	1	
Billy Ray Robles	Guard	Northern Iloilo State University	2016-17	2018	1	
Larry Rodriguez	Forward	PMI Colleges	2010-11	2014	4	
Kris Rosales	Guard	Hope International University	2017-18	2020	2	
Richard Ross	Forward	Old Dominion University	2019	2019	1	

== S ==
Name	Position	College	Season entered	Left team	No. of seasons	Ref.
Jay Sagad	Forward	Saint Benilde	2006-07	2007-08	2	
Allan Salangsang	Forward	Colegio de San Juan de Letran	2007-08	2010	3	
Rob Sanders	Center	Providence College	2006-07	2006-07	1	
Adonis Santa Maria	Center	De La Salle University	2006-07	2008	2	
Corey Santee	Guard	Texas Christian University	2008	2008	1	
Leonard Santillan	Forward	De La Salle University	2021	present	-	
Bruno Šundov	Center	Croatia	2012-13	2013	1	

== T ==
Name	Position	College	Season entered	Left team	No. of seasons	Ref,
Shawn Taggart	Forward/center	University of Memphis	2016-17	2017	1	
Ty Tang	Guard	De La Salle University	2008-09	2015	7	
Jojo Tangkay	Guard	Southwestern University	2006-07	2008	2	
Steve Taylor Jr.	Forward/center	University of Toledo	2022-23	2022	1	
Mark Telan	Forward	De La Salle University	2009-10	2010	1	
Jeric Teng	Guard	University of Santo Tomas	2013-14	2016	3	
Chris Tiu	Guard	Ateneo de Manila University	2012-13	2019	6	
Vince Tolentino	Forward	Ateneo de Manila University	2020	2022	3	
Mike Tolomia	Guard	Far Eastern University	2016-17	present	1	
Norbert Torres	Forward/center	De La Salle University	2017-18	present	-	
Don Trollano	Guard	Adamson University	2015-16	present	3	

== U ==
Name	Position	College	Season entered	Left team	No. of seasons	Ref.
Jonathan Uyloan	Guard	Goldenwest College	2010-11	2015	5	

== V ==
Name	Pos.	College	Season entered	Left team	No. of seasons	Ref.
Josh Vanlandingham	G	Pacific Lutheran University	2010-11	2011	1	

== W ==
Name	Position	College	Season entered	Left team	No. of seasons	Ref.
Rob Wainwright	Center	Solano Community College	2006-07	2009	3	
Henry Walker	Guard/forward	Kansas State University	2021	2022	1	
Jay Washington	Forward/center	Eckerd	2015-16	2019	2	
Terrence Watson	Forward	Ball State University	2017-18	2018	1	
J.D. Weatherspoon	Forward	University of Toledo	2016-17	2017	1	
Wayland White	Center	University of New Mexico	2006-07	2007	1	
Adrian Wong	Guard	Ateneo de Manila University	2020	2022	2	
Antoine Wright	Guard/forward	Texas A&M University	2015-16	2016	1	
Joel Wright	Forward	Texas State University	2019	2019	1	

== Y ==
Name	Pos.	College	Season entered	Left team	No. of seasons	Ref.
James Yap	Guard/forward	UE	2015-16	present	-	
