= 2006–07 Welcoat Dragons season =

2006-07 Welcoat Dragons season
- Head coach: Leo Austria
- General Manager: Boy Lapid
- Owner(s): Asian Coating, Inc.

Philippine Cup results
- Record: 3–15 (16.7%)
- Place: 10th
- Playoff finish: Eliminated

Fiesta Conference results
- Record: 4–14 (22.2%)
- Place: 10th
- Playoff finish: Eliminated

Welcoat Dragons seasons

The 2006–07 Welcoat Dragons season was the 1st season of the franchise in the Philippine Basketball Association (PBA).

== Newest member ==
Welcoat bought the Pilipinas Shell franchise early in the year. The team is co-owned by Raymund Yu and Terry Que and the ballclub in their first season will be known as Welcoat Dragons.

== Key dates ==
August 20: The 2006 PBA Draft took place in Fort Bonifacio, Taguig.

== Draft picks ==
Round	Pick	Player	Height	Position	Nationality	College
1	10	Abby Santos	6'3"	Forward	Philippines	UP Diliman
2	11	Jireh Ibañes	6'2"	Small Forward	Philippines	UP Diliman

== Welcoat Carry-Over Amateurs ==
Player	Height	Position	Nationality	College
Junjun Cabatu	6'5"	Forward	Philippines	De La Salle
Jay-R Reyes	6'7"	Forward	Philippines	UP Diliman
Jay Sagad	6'4"	Forward	Philippines	St. Benilde

== Roster ==
2006–07 Welcoat Dragons roster
Players

Pos.	#	POB	Name	Height	Weight	DOB (YYYY–MM–DD)	From
F	3	(United States)	Rob Wainwright	6 ft 5 in (1.96 m)	200 lb (91 kg)		Solano CC
F	5	(Philippines)	Junjun Cabatu	6 ft 5 in (1.96 m)	215 lb (98 kg)		De La Salle
G	6	(Philippines)	Joey Mente	5 ft 9 in (1.75 m)	180 lb (82 kg)		Lyceum
F/C	8	(Philippines)	Jay-R Reyes	6 ft 7 in (2.01 m)	215 lb (98 kg)		Philippines
G/F	14	(Philippines)	Niño Gelig	6 ft 2 in (1.88 m)	170 lb (77 kg)		UST
F/C	16	(Philippines)	Adonis Santa Maria	6 ft 5 in (1.96 m)	205 lb (93 kg)		De La Salle
G	17	(Philippines)	Froilan Baguion	5 ft 8 in (1.73 m)	150 lb (68 kg)		National-U
G/F	19	(Philippines)	Jojo Tangkay	6 ft 2 in (1.88 m)	168 lb (76 kg)		Southwestern-U
C	32	(Philippines)	EJ Feihl	7 ft 0 in (2.13 m)	285 lb (129 kg)		Adamson
F	33	(Philippines)	Jireh Ibañes	6 ft 2 in (1.88 m)	168 lb (76 kg)		Philippines
G	44	(United States)	Denver Lopez	6 ft 2 in (1.88 m)	179 lb (81 kg)		Cal State Fullerton
C	80	(Philippines)	Gilbert Lao	6 ft 8 in (2.03 m)	210 lb (95 kg)		UST
F	88	(Philippines)	Jay Sagad	6 ft 4 in (1.93 m)	220 lb (100 kg)		St. Benilde
G	22	(United States)	Alex Compton (I)	5 ft 11 in (1.80 m)	175 lb (79 kg)		Cornell
F	2	(United States)	Charles Clark (I)	6 ft 5 in (1.96 m)	250 lb (113 kg)		Johnson C. Smith
F/C	33	(United States)	Rob Sanders (I)	6 ft 6 in (1.98 m)	215 lb (98 kg)		Providence
F	9	(United States)	Wayland White (I)	6 ft 6 in (1.98 m)	224 lb (102 kg)		New Mexico

Coaches

Head coach

- (Philippines) Leo Austria

Assistant coach(es)

- (Philippines) Caloy Garcia
- (Philippines) Alex Compton

Legend

- (C) Team captain
- (I) Import
- Injured

== Philippine Cup ==
=== Game log ===
2006–07 PBA Philippine Cup game log
October

Game	Date	Opponent	Score	High points	High rebounds	High assists	Location Attendance	Record
1	October 1	Brgy.Ginebra	69-102	Lopez (12)			Araneta Coliseum	0–1
2	October 8	Coca Cola	85-75	Reyes (16)			Araneta Coliseum	1–1
3	October 13	Talk 'N Text	99-115	Lopez (21)			Cuneta Astrodome	1–2
4	October 15	San Miguel	96-88	Tangkay (18)			Araneta Coliseum	2–2
5	October 22	Air21	94-110	Tangkay (15)			Cuneta Astrodome	2–3
6	October 27	Red Bull	77-80	Cabatu (22)			Araneta Coliseum	2–4
7	October 29	Coca Cola	86-92	Tangkay (25)			Araneta Coliseum	2–5

November

Game	Date	Opponent	Score	High points	High rebounds	High assists	Location Attendance	Record
8	November 4	Sta.Lucia	83-89	Wainwright (17)			The Arena in San Juan	2–6
9	November 9	Talk 'N Text	79-72				Lanao del Norte	3–6
10	November 12	Purefoods	84-86	Gelig (22)			Araneta Coliseum	3–7
11	November 17	Alaska	91-97 OT	Lopez (20)			Araneta Coliseum	3–8
12	November 22	Air21	85-100	Tangkay (16)			Araneta Coliseum	3–9
13	November 29	Brgy.Ginebra	66-87	Lopez (21)			Araneta Coliseum	3–10

December

Game	Date	Opponent	Score	High points	High rebounds	High assists	Location Attendance	Record
14	December 1	Purefoods	74-76	Reyes (14)			Araneta Coliseum	3–11
15	December 6	Red Bull	78-97	Reyes (18)			Araneta Coliseum	3–12
16	December 10	Sta.Lucia	82-98	Reyes (19)			Cuneta Astrodome	3–13
17	December 13	San Miguel	85-97	Reyes (15)			Araneta Coliseum	3–14
18	December 20	Alaska	90-96	Reyes (26)			Araneta Coliseum	3–15

2006–07 schedule

== Fiesta Conference ==
=== Game log ===
2007 PBA Fiesta Conference game log
March

Game	Date	Opponent	Score	High points	High rebounds	High assists	Location Attendance	Record
1	March 4	Coca Cola	79-81	Reyes (25)			Cuneta Astrodome	0–1
2	March 11	Sta.Lucia	114-104	Clark (37)			Araneta Coliseum	1–1
3	March 16	Brgy.Ginebra	97-99	Clark (26)			Araneta Coliseum	1–2
4	March 21	Alaska	78-99	Clark (29)			Araneta Coliseum	1–3
5	March 24	Talk 'N Text	78-100	Clark (33)			Cabanatuan	1–4
6	March 30	Air21	103-99	Clark (40)			Araneta Coliseum	2–4

April

Game	Date	Opponent	Score	High points	High rebounds	High assists	Location Attendance	Record
7	April 8	Purefoods	82-94	Compton (24)			Araneta Coliseum	2–5
8	April 15	San Miguel	90-96	Sanders (29)			Araneta Coliseum	2–6
9	April 18	Red Bull	71-100				Araneta Coliseum	2–7
10	April 22	Air21	94-102	Compton (38)			Araneta Coliseum	2–8

May

Game	Date	Opponent	Score	High points	High rebounds	High assists	Location Attendance	Record
11	May 2	Brgy.Ginebra	71-103	Reyes (20)			Araneta Coliseum	2–9
12	May 6	Alaska	66-74	White (18)			Araneta Coliseum	2–10
13	May 10	Talk 'N Text	98-88	White (31)			The Arena in San Juan	3–10
14	May 16	Sta.Lucia	104-112 (2OT)	White (33)			Araneta Coliseum	3–11
15	May 18	Red Bull	81-103	White, Compton, Reyes (14)			Araneta Coliseum	3–12
16	May 23	San Miguel	79-119	White (29)			Ynares Center	3–13
17	May 25	Coca Cola	86-80	Compton (21)			Ynares Center	4–13

June

Game	Date	Opponent	Score	High points	High rebounds	High assists	Location Attendance	Record
18	June 1	Purefoods	97-109	White (30)	White (11)		Ynares Center	4–14

2006–07 schedule
