= 2000–01 Philippine Basketball League season =

2000–01 PBL season
- Duration: March 25, 2000 – June 21, 2001
- Teams: 9
- TV partner: PTV
- Season MVP: Roger Yap; Ren-Ren Ritualo; Chester Tolomia
- Chairman's Cup champions: Welcoat Paints
- Chairman's Cup runners-up: Shark Energy Drink
- Challenge Cup champions: Shark Energy Drink
- Challenge Cup runners-up: Welcoat Paints
- Alaxan-Chairman's Cup champions: Welcoat Paints
- Alaxan-Chairman's Cup runners-up: Shark Energy Drink

Seasons
- 1999-00 2001-02

The 2000–2001 season of the Philippine Basketball League (PBL).

== Notable events ==
When the Philippine Basketball League opens its 2000 season on March 25, the league pays tribute to the 12 players whose contributions help the PBL become the top amateur commercial circuit, among the 12 players chosen were Allan Caidic, Jojo Lastimosa, Benjie Paras, Jerry Codinera, Vergel Meneses, Jun Limpot, Marlou Aquino, Johnny Abarrientos, Danny Ildefonso, Alvin Patrimonio, Eric Menk and Sonny Cabatu.

== New Commissioner ==
Under the leadership of Chino Trinidad, the first tournament of the 2000 season was called Chairman's Cup in honor of the new board chairman Dioceldo Sy of Blu Detergent.

== 2000 Chairman's Cup ==
Qualified for semifinals

#	Team Standings	W	L	PCT	GB
1	Welcoat Paints	8	2	.800	--
2	Shark Energy Drink	8	2	.800	--
3	Blu Detergent	6	4	.600	2
4	Bingo Pilipino Milyonaryo	6	4	.600	2
5	ANA Freezers	4	6	.400	4
6	Dazz Dishwashing Liquid	4	6	.400	4
7	Montaña Jewels	3	7	.300	5
8	Ateneo/Hapee	1	9	.100	7

Joining the league in the Chairman's Cup were Ateneo/Hapee toothpaste, coach by former MBA's Manila Metrostars mentor Ricky Dandan, and guest team Bingo Pilipino, handled by former Crispa great Bernie Fabiosa, former pro cager Dante Gonzalgo replaces Jimmy Mariano as head coach of ANA Freezers while Leo Isaac moved over to coach Montaña Jewels.

Shark Energy Drink, which bought the franchise of Chowking, and Welcoat easily made it to the finals. Shark finished with a 16-2 won-loss record in the five-team semifinal round while the Paintmasters ended up with a 13-5 card. The won-loss slates of the rest of the semifinalists were Blu Detergent (10–8), Bingo Pilipino (8–10) and ANA (5–13).

=== Finals ===
June 20

recap

Welcoat Paints 69, Shark Energy Drink 62

Makati Coliseum, Makati

June 22

recap

Welcoat Paints 67, Shark Energy Drink 60

Makati Coliseum, Makati

June 24

recap

Welcoat Paints 66, Shark Energy Drink 61 (OT)

Makati Coliseum, Makati

June 27

Welcoat Paints 76, Shark Energy Drink 58
Welcoat wins series, 4-0

Makati Coliseum, Makati

Welcoat completed a four-game sweep over Shark Energy Drink in the best-of-seven finals series as coach Junel Baculi won his 4th PBL title, three of them with the Paintmasters, the hot hands of Renren Ritualo and Yancy De Ocampo's dominating inside plays proved too much to handle against the talented Energy Drink Kings, which missed the services of MVP Roger Yap on injury. Coach Baculi masterfully shuffled the backcourt of Welcoat composed of Ritualo, Celino Cruz, Jojo Manalo and Anton Villoria, which frustrated coach Leo Austria's charges.

== 2000-2001 Challenge Cup ==
Qualified for semifinals

#	Team Standings	W	L	PCT	GB
1	Shark Energy Drink	8	2	.800	--
2	Welcoat Paints	7	3	.700	1
3	Montaña Jewels	6	4	.600	2
4	Blu Sun Power	6	4	.600	2
5	Hapee Toothpaste	5	5	.500	3
6	Ateneo-Pioneer	4	6	.400	4
7	ANA Freezers	4	6	.400	4
8	Osaka Iridology	3	7	.300	5
9	PharmaQuick	2	8	.200	6

Ateneo defeats ANA, 67–61 on January 6, 2001, to clinch the 6th and last semifinals slot. In the one-round semifinals with a win 4-of-5 incentive, Shark (13–2) and Welcoat (11–4) advances in a championship rematch, Blu Sun Power (8–7) and Montaña (7–8) will play in the series for third place. Hapee Toothpaste and Ateneo-Pioneer finishes with similar six wins and nine losses.

=== Finals ===
February 1

recap

Shark Energy Drink 59, Welcoat Paints 72

Makati Coliseum, Makati

February 3

recap

Shark Energy Drink 86, Welcoat Paints 92

Makati Coliseum, Makati

February 6

recap

Shark Energy Drink 65, Welcoat Paints 50

Makati Coliseum, Makati

February 8

recap

Shark Energy Drink 62, Welcoat Paints 50

Makati Coliseum, Makati

February 10

recap

Shark Energy Drink 75, Welcoat Paints 76

Makati Coliseum, Makati

February 13

recap

Shark Energy Drink 60, Welcoat Paints 54

Makati Coliseum, Makati

February 17

Shark Energy Drink 67, Welcoat Paints 54
Shark wins series, 4-3

Makati Coliseum, Makati

Shark Energy Drink won their first championship in a come-from-behind 4–3 series victory over multi-titled Welcoat Paintmasters, winning the deciding seventh game, 67–54, and giving coach Leo Austria his first PBL title in three years of coaching. Shark previously lost to Welcoat in the finals via four-game sweep in their very first conference as a rookie team. After dropping the first two games of the series, all signs pointed to another Welcoat sweep after that, but the Power Boosters halted the Paintmasters' string of 12 straight wins with a 65–50 victory in Game three.

In his final PBL season, Roger Yap scored 22 points, including 12 in the third period. Contributions from Rysal Castro's perimeter play and Michael Robinson's performance in the final quarter secured the championship campaign for the Power Boosters.

== 2001 Alaxan-Chairman's Cup ==
Quarterfinalist in Group A
Quarterfinalist in Group B

#	Team	W	L	PCT	GB
1	Shark Energy Drink	8	0	1.000	--
2	ANA Freezers	6	2	.750	2
3	Welcoat Paints	5	3	.625	3
4	GIV Beauty Soap	5	3	.625	3
5	PharmaQuick	5	3	.625	3
6	Hapee Toothpaste	3	5	.375	5
7	Ateneo-Pioneer	2	6	.250	6
8	Montaña Jewels	2	6	.250	6
9	Osaka Iridology	0	8	.000	8

In the quarterfinal round divided into two groups, the top four teams; Shark Energy Drink, ANA Freezers, Welcoat and GIV soap are in Group A, the remaining five teams comprises Group B, after a one-round quarterfinals in each group, Shark (9–2) and ANA Freezers (8–3) will enjoy a twice-to-beat advantage against Welcoat (7–4) and GIV (6–5), which beat PharmaQuick (7–5) in a playoff, 70–68 on June 2, to enter the final four semifinalists.

=== Semifinals (Twice-to-beat) ===
June 5

Shark Energy Drink 34, GIV Beauty Soap 58

Makati Coliseum, Makati

June 7

ANA Freezers 53, Welcoat Paints 72

Makati Coliseum, Makati

June 12

Shark Energy Drink 96, GIV Beauty Soap 93 (3OT)

Makati Coliseum, Makati

June 12

ANA Freezers 58, Welcoat Paints 72

Makati Coliseum, Makati

In the semifinals twice-to-beat, GIV held Shark Energy Drink to an all-time lowest score of 34 points and force a sudden-death playoff for the finals berth. One week later on June 12, Shark enters the championship series against rival Welcoat Paints with a triple-overtime victory over GIV Soap.

=== Finals ===
June 14

recap

Welcoat Paints 58, Shark Energy Drink 57

Makati Coliseum, Makati

June 16

recap

Welcoat Paints 80, Shark Energy Drink 79 (OT)

Makati Coliseum, Makati

June 19

recap

Welcoat Paints 73, Shark Energy Drink 65

Makati Coliseum, Makati

June 21

Welcoat Paints 70, Shark Energy Drink 62
Welcoat wins series, 4-0

Makati Coliseum, Makati

For the third time in the finals series, Welcoat and Shark arrange a title showdown, the Paintmasters return to the top and duplicate their 4–0 sweep over the Power Boosters in last year's Chairman's Cup with another four-game sweep, finals MVP Jojo Manalo, Renren Ritualo, Celino Cruz, Brix Encarnacion and Yancy De Ocampo kept the Power Boosters at bay in the title-clinching Game 4 as Welcoat avenged their 4-3 setback to Shark in the Challenge Cup. The victory also reaffirmed the supremacy of Welcoat with four PBL titles, all of which happened via sweeps.
