= 2001–02 Philippine Basketball League season =

2001–02 PBL season
- Duration: November 3, 2001 – June 24, 2002
- Teams: 8
- TV partner: NBN
- Season MVP: Yancy De Ocampo; Enrico Villanueva
- Challenge Cup champions: Shark Energy Drink
- Challenge Cup runners-up: Welcoat Paints
- Chairman's Cup champions: Ateneo Hapee-Negros Navigation
- Chairman's Cup runners-up: Blu Sun Power

Seasons
- 2000-01 2002-03

The 2001–02 season of the Philippine Basketball League (PBL).

== 2001-02 Challenge Cup ==
Team standings	Win	Loss	Head coach
Welcoat Paints	9	5	Junel Baculi
Shark Energy Drink	9	5	Leo Austria
ICTSI-La Salle	9	5	Franz Pumaren
Kutitap Toothpaste	8	6	Koy Banal
Blu Detergent	7	7	Tony dela Cerna
ANA Freezers	5	9	Rudy Mendoza
Montaña Jewels	5	9	Arturo Valenzona
Ateneo-Pioneer	4	10	Ricky Dandan

ICTSI-La Salle and Shark Power Boosters battled in a sudden death playoff for an outright semifinals berth along with Welcoat Paints. ANA Freezers and Montaña collided for the last quarterfinals slot.

=== Finals ===
January 29

Shark Energy Drink 80, Welcoat Paints 79 (2OT)

Makati Coliseum, Makati

January 31

Shark Energy Drink 67, Welcoat Paints 58

Makati Coliseum, Makati

February 2

Shark Energy Drink 61, Welcoat Paints 46

Makati Coliseum, Makati

February 5

Shark Energy Drink 47, Welcoat Paints 66

Makati Coliseum, Makati

February 7

Shark Energy Drink 64, Welcoat Paints 58 (OT)
Shark wins series, 4-1

Makati Coliseum, Makati

Shark Energy Drink and Welcoat Paints battled for the fourth straight time in the finals series, the Energy Drink Kings retained the Challenge Cup title with a 4–1 series victory, winning game five in overtime, 64–58. After the finals, Welcoat co-team owner Raymund Yu confirmed that the Paintmasters would take a leave of absence for two conferences before resuming its PBL campaign.

=== Individual awards ===
- Challenge Cup
- Most Valuable Player: Yancy De Ocampo (Welcoat)
- Sportsmanship Award: Dondon Mendoza (ANA Freezers)
- Most Improved Player Award: Gary David (Montaña)
- Finals MVP: Warren Ybañez (Shark)
- Mythical Five
  - Yancy De Ocampo (Welcoat)
  - Chester Tolomia (Shark)
  - Renren Ritualo (Welcoat)
  - Warren Ybañez (Shark)
  - Allan Salangsang (Welcoat)

== 2002 Chairman's Cup ==
Qualified for semifinals

#	Team standings	W	L	PCT	GB
1	Ateneo-Hapee-NENACO	8	3	.727	--
2	Blu Sun Power	7	4	.636	1
3	ICTSI-La Salle	7	4	.636	1
4	Shark Energy Drink	6	5	.545	2
5	Kutitap Toothpaste	6	5	.545	2
6	ANA Freezers	6	5	.545	2
7	John-O-Juzz	5	6	.455	3
8	Montaña Jewels	2	9	.181	6
9	RP Youth-Burlington	0	8	.000	8

The RP Nationals did not win a single game in all their outings against the eight regular ballclubs.

Kutitap took the last semifinals slot, following a victory over John-O in a do-or-die game.

Ana Freezers were tied with Shark and Kutitap with a 6-5 won-loss slate, but were eliminated via lower quotient.

=== Finals ===
June 17

recap

Ateneo-Hapee 76, Blu Sun Power 73

Makati Coliseum, Makati

June 19

recap

Ateneo-Hapee 92, Blu Sun Power 86 (2OT)

Pasig Sports Center, Pasig

June 21

recap

Ateneo-Hapee 45, Blu Sun Power 46

Makati Coliseum, Makati

June 24

Ateneo-Hapee 60, Blu Sun Power 56
Ateneo-Hapee wins series, 3-1

Makati Coliseum, Makati

Ateneo-Hapee added another chapter to its history, joining the elite list of PBL champions by winning their finals series over Blu Sun Power. Enrico Villanueva was voted the conference Most Valuable Player and finals MVP. Villanueva powered his way to 24 points in the title-clinching game four. Joel Banal coached the Blue Eagles for the first time. Other Eagles who did their share for the championship victory included Rich Alvarez, Larry Fonacier, Celino Cruz and Gec Chia.
