= 2002 in Philippine television =

The following is a list of events affecting Philippine television in 2002. Events listed include television show debuts, finales, cancellations, and channel launches, closures and rebrandings, as well as information about controversies and carriage disputes.

== Events ==
- January 1 – An unknown contestant won the jackpot prize of one million pesos on Eat Bulaga!'s Laban o Bawi.
- June 26 – Henry Ilustre won the jackpot prize of one million pesos on Eat Bulaga!'s Laban o Bawi.
- October 27 – GMA Network Inc. launches the "Kapuso" branding.

=== Unknown dates ===
- Joel Delos Santos won the jackpot prize of one million pesos on Eat Bulaga!'s Laban o Bawi.
- Maria Victoria De Jesus won the jackpot prize of one million pesos on Eat Bulaga!'s Laban o Bawi.

== Premieres ==
Date	Show
January 7	Express Balita on IBC 13
January 7	IBC News Tonite on IBC 13
January 7	Hunter × Hunter on GMA 7
January 13	K! on GMA 7
February 11	Natalia on IBC 13
February 14	Mellow Myx on Myx
February 14	My Myx on Myx
February 14	Myx Backtrax on Myx
February 14	Myx Daily Top 10 on Myx
February 14	Myx Premiere on Myx
February 14	Myx Remakes on Myx
February 14	Myx Take 5 on Myx
February 14	OPM Myx on Myx
February 14	Pop Myx on Myx
February 14	Star Myx on Myx
February 16	OPM Myx Countdown on Myx
February 17	Myx Hit Chart on Myx
February 18	Nunca te olvidaré on ABS-CBN 2
February 18	Morning Myx on Myx
February 19	Myx Live! on Myx
February 20	Myx Presents on Myx
February 24	Trash en Traffic on IBC 13
March 1	Survivor: Marquesas on Studio 23
March 4	Crayon Shin-chan on IBC 13
March 4	Cyborg Kuro-chan on IBC 13
March 6	Klasmeyts on ABS-CBN 2
March 18	Judy Abott on ABS-CBN 2
March 31	Star for a Night on IBC 13
April 2	Bubu Chacha on ABS-CBN 2
April 6	Digimon Adventure 02 on ABS-CBN 2
April 6	Home Grown on Net 25
April 6	House Calls on Net 25
April 6	Noli Me Tangere on Net 25
April 7	Between the Lions on Net 25
April 7	Li'l Elvis and the Truckstoppers on Net 25
April 7	Li'l Horrors on Net 25
April 8	Kung Mawawala Ka on GMA 7
April 14	Txtrs5 on GMA 7
April 15	Sons Of Thunder on RPN 9
April 17	Higher Ground on RPN 9
April 17	The Fugitive on RPN 9
May 5	Kahit Kailan on GMA 7
May 6	Slam Dunk on GMA 7
May 14	OK Fine, 'To ang Gusto Nyo! on ABS-CBN 2
May 16	Daboy en Da Girl on GMA 7
May 22	People First on IBC 13
June 8	Tanging Yaman, The Series on ABS-CBN 2
June 10	Charlotte on GMA 7
June 18	Diwa on IBC 13
June 19	S.A.T.S.U. on IBC 13
June 21	Bilyaran Na on IBC 13
June 22	K2BU on ABS-CBN 2
June 29	Wish Ko Lang! on GMA 7
July 8	Kay Tagal Kang Hinintay on ABS-CBN 2
July 8	Ready, Txt, Go! on GMA 7
July 15	Jenny on ABS-CBN 2
July 15	Cat's Eye on GMA 7
July 15	Ang Iibigin ay Ikaw on GMA 7
July 15	Flash Report on GMA 7
July 20	Flash Report Special Edition on GMA 7
July 21	Mojacko on GMA 7
July 22	Morning Girls with Kris and Korina on ABS-CBN 2
July 29	Little Ana on GMA 7
August 4	Family TV Mass on IBC 13
August 5	Magandang Umaga, Bayan on ABS-CBN 2
August 10	Magandang Umaga, Bayan Weekend on ABS-CBN 2
August 10	UFO Baby on ABS-CBN 2
August 10	Willingly Yours on ABS-CBN 2
August 12	Inuyasha on ABS-CBN 2
August 23	One Piece on GMA 7
August 26	Adriana on GMA 7
September 14	Bitag on ABC 5
September 20	Survivor: Thailand on Studio 23
September 22	In3 on RPN 9
September 23	Bituin on ABS-CBN 2
October 7	Flame of Recca on GMA 7
October 19	Chikiting Patrol on ABC 5
October 20	Gadget Boy & Heather on GMA 7
October 28	Ecomoda on ABS-CBN 2
November 2	Blockbusters Cinema on GMA 7
November 4	Habang Kapiling Ka on GMA 7
November 11	Wheels of Love on ABS-CBN 2
November 16	Berks on ABS-CBN 2
November 16	Bida si Mister, Bida si Misis on ABS-CBN 2
November 16	Entrepinoy Start-Up on IBC 13
December 2	Magpakailanman on GMA 7
December 9	Beyblade on ABS-CBN 2
December 9	Sakura Wars on ABS-CBN 2
December 9	Maria la del Barrio on GMA 7
December 21	Art is-Kool on GMA 7

=== Unknown date ===
- June: Biker Mice from Mars on ABC 5
- August: Cristina on ABS-CBN 2
- December
  - Maria Belen on GMA 7
  - Smart Amazing Dreams on ABS-CBN 2

=== Unknown ===
- Ito Ang Balita on SBN 21
- Kumikitang Kabuhayan on ABS-CBN 2
- E.T.C. on ABS-CBN 2
- Paloma on ABS-CBN 2
- Romantica on ABS-CBN 2
- Daniela on ABS-CBN 2
- Kakasa Ka Ba? on ABS-CBN 2
- Gus Abelgas: Nag-Uulat on ABS-CBN 2
- Alias on ABS-CBN 2
- GoGo V on ABS-CBN 2
- Heavy Gear on ABS-CBN 2
- Jackie Chan Adventures on ABS-CBN 2
- Masked Rider Kuuga on ABS-CBN 2
- Mumble Bumble on ABS-CBN 2
- Rolie Polie Olie on ABS-CBN 2
- PLDT Playtym on GMA 7
- Extra Showbiz on GMA 7
- Extra Ordinaryo on GMA 7
- Extra Lifestyle on GMA 7
- Extra Income on GMA 7
- Make Way for Noddy on GMA 7
- Pollyanna on GMA 7
- Marimar on GMA 7
- Up Close and Personal with Marissa del Mar on IBC 13
- Nora Mismo on IBC 13
- Kopi Shop on IBC 13
- Travel: Philippines on IBC 13
- Novartis Payo ni Doc on RPN 9
- Match TV on RPN 9
- Side Stitch on RPN 9
- Task Force Siyasat on ABC 5
- Sabrina: The Animated Series on ABC 5
- Bugs on ABC 5
- Poltergeist: The Legacy on ABC 5
- Two on ABC 5
- 24 on RPN 9
- JAG on RPN 9
- Seven Days on RPN 9
- Hidden Hills on RPN 9
- Still Standing on RPN 9
- Talitha Kum Healing Mass on NBN 4
- 1062 kHz Balita Update on Net 25
- Openline on Net 25
- Donny & Marie on Net 25
- Next Stop on Net 25
- Top Story on ANC
- E! News Live on E! Philippines
- In the Raw on UNTV 37
- Strangebrew on UNTV 37
- Nip Fartor on UNTV 37
- Judging Amy on ZOE TV 11
- Everybody Loves Raymond on ZOE TV 11
- Edgemont on ZOE TV 11
- Sports Illustrated For Kids Show on ZOE TV 11
- Ladies Man on ZOE TV 11
- Mariú on ZOE TV 11

== Returning or renamed programs ==
Show	Last aired	Retitled as/Season/Notes	Channel	Return date
IBC Express Balita	2002	Express Balita	IBC	January 7
Philippine Basketball Association	2001 (season 27: "Governors' Cup")	Same (season 28: "Governors' Cup")	IBC	February 10
Survivor	2002 (season 3: "Africa")	Same (season 4: "Marquesas")	Studio 23	March 1
Philippine Basketball League	2002 (season 19: "Alaxan-Challenge Cup")	Same (season 19: "Chairman's Cup")	NBN	April 3
Metropolitan Basketball Association	2001	Same (2002 season)	NBN	April 6
Philippine Basketball Association	2002 (season 28: "Governors' Cup")	Same (season 28: "Commissioner's Cup")	IBC	June 16
National Collegiate Athletic Association	2002 (NBN)	Same (season 78)	Studio 23	June 29
University Athletic Association of the Philippines	2002	Same (season 65)	Studio 23	July 13
Survivor	2002 (season 4: "Marquesas")	Same (season 5: "Thailand")	Studio 23	September 20
Philippine Basketball Association	2002 (season 28: "Commissioner's Cup")	Same (season 28: "All-Filipino Cup")	IBC	October 20
Philippine Basketball League	2002 (NBN; season 19: "Chairman's Cup")	Same (season 20: "Challenge Cup")	NBN / Studio 23	November 4
National Basketball Association	2002 (NBN)	Same (2002–03 season)	IBC / Solar Sports	November

== Programs transferring networks ==
Date	Show	No. of seasons	Moved from	Moved to
April 2	Bubu Chacha	—N/a	IBC	ABS-CBN
May 6	Slam Dunk	—N/a	ABC	GMA
June 10	Charlotte	—N/a	ABS-CBN	GMA
June 29	National Collegiate Athletic Association	78	NBN	Studio 23
October 19	Chikiting Patrol	—N/a	ABS-CBN / IBC / GMA	ABC
November	National Basketball Association	57	NBN	IBC / Solar Sports
Unknown	Side Stitch	—N/a	ABC	RPN
Unknown	The 700 Club Asia	—N/a	GMA	ABS-CBN / ABC
Unknown	Aawitan Kita	—N/a	GMA	ABC

== Finales ==
- January 4:
  - IBC Express Balita (IBC 13)
  - Ronda Trese (IBC 13)
- January 6: Viva Sinerama (GMA 7)
- January 11:
  - Flames (ABS-CBN 2)
  - Ang TV 2 (ABS-CBN 2)
  - Survivor: Africa (Studio 23)
- January 25: Biglang Sibol, Bayang Impasibol (GMA 7)
- January 27: Eezy Dancing (ABC 5)
- March 1: GMA Love Stories (GMA 7)
- March 16: ABS-CBN News Updates (ABS-CBN 2)
- March 23: Sarap TV (ABS-CBN 2)
- April 5: Sorcerer Hunters (GMA 7)
- April 8: The X Files (RPN 9)
- April 10:
  - Level 9 (RPN 9)
  - Buffy The Vampire Slayer (RPN 9)
- April 13: Musika Atbp. (IBC 13)
- April 28: Anna Karenina (GMA 7)
- May 3: Ghost Fighter (GMA 7)
- May 7:
  - Attagirl (ABS-CBN 2)
  - !Oka Tokat (ABS-CBN 2)
- May 9: Kasangga (GMA 7)
- May 16: Bayani (ABS-CBN 2)
- May 20: Survivor: Marquesas (Studio 23)
- May 31: Wheel of Fortune (ABC 5)
- June 1: Ang Munting Paraiso (ABS-CBN 2)
- June 7: Make Way for Noddy (GMA 7)
- June 14: Natalia (IBC 13)
- June 15: G-mik (ABS-CBN 2)
- June 22: Hunter × Hunter (GMA 7)
- July 5: Your Honor (ABS-CBN 2)
- July 12: Sine Siete (GMA 7)
- July 14:
  - 5 and Up (GMA 7)
  - Chikiting Patrol (GMA 7)
  - GMA Network News (GMA 7)
  - GMA News Live (GMA 7)
- July 19: Talk TV (ABS-CBN 2)
- July 26: Sine Klasiks (ABC 5)
- July 28: Saint Peregrine: TV Sunday Mass (IBC 13)
- August 2:
  - Balita Alas Singko ng Umaga (ABS-CBN 2)
  - Alas Singko Y Medya (ABS-CBN 2)
- August 3: Digimon Adventure 02 (ABS-CBN 2)
- August 4: Alas Singko Y Medya Weekend (ABS-CBN 2)
- September 20: Pangako Sa 'Yo (ABS-CBN 2)
- October 4: Slam Dunk (GMA 7)
- October 20:
  - Cathedral of Praise (GMA 7)
  - Word of Hope (GMA 7)
  - The 700 Club (GMA 7)
- October 23: Signs and Wonders (GMA 7)
- October 25:
  - The 700 Club Asia (GMA 7)
  - One Cubed (GMA 7)
  - CWN: Christian World News (GMA 7)
  - Let There Be Light (GMA 7)
- October 26:
  - Pinoy Blockbusters (GMA 7)
  - Guidelines with Dr. Harold J. Sala (GMA 7)
  - Jesus Miracle Crusade Ministry (GMA 7)
  - Usapang Business (ABS-CBN 2)
- November 1: Ikaw Lang ang Mamahalin (GMA 7)
- November 8: Nunca te olvidaré (ABS-CBN 2)
- November 9:
  - K2BU (ABS-CBN 2)
  - Mary D' Potter (ABS-CBN 2)
- November 25: GMA's Best (GMA 7)
- December 6: Marimar (GMA 7)
- December 14: Who Wants to Be a Millionaire? (IBC 13)
- December 20: Survivor: Thailand (Studio 23)
- December 25: PBA on Viva TV (IBC 13)
- December 28: Family Feud (ABC 5)

=== Unknown dates ===
- August: Tres mujeres (ABS-CBN 2)
- October: The Weakest Link (IBC 13)
- November: People First (IBC 13)
- December: Monica Brava (GMA 7)

=== Unknown ===
- A Little Night of Music (GMA 7)
- Pollyanna (GMA 7)
- Isyu 101 (ABS-CBN 2)
- Kabalikat, Loren Legarda (ABS-CBN 2)
- Da Pilya en da Pilot (ABS-CBN 2)
- Kakasa Ka Ba? (ABS-CBN 2)
- Sapul Kayo D'yan! (ABS-CBN 2)
- True Crime (ABS-CBN 2)
- Kids Club (ZOE TV 11)
- Kids Against Crime (ZOE TV 11)
- Side Stitch (ABC 5)
- Hershey's Kidz Town (ABC 5)
- Trabaho Lang! (ABC 5)
- Guide To Urban Living (Studio 23)
- Habang May Buhay (IBC 13)
- Hapi Kung Healthy (IBC 13)
- Pangako ng Lupa (IBC 13)
- Kagat ng Dilim (IBC 13)
- Kopi Shop (IBC 13)
- S.A.T.S.U. (IBC 13)
- Travel and Trade (IBC 13)
- Take Four (NBN 4)
- Maria del Cielo (IBC 13)
- Sigaw: The Campus Debate Series (NBN 4)
- MMDA: On the Road! (NBN 4)
- Philippines' Most Wanted (NBN 4)
- Kusina Atbp. (NBN 4)
- Lutong Bahay (NBN 4)
- Alicia (ABS-CBN 2)
- Judy Abott (ABS-CBN 2)
- Bubu Chacha (ABS-CBN 2)
- Jenny (ABS-CBN 2)
- Inuyasha (ABS-CBN 2)
- Cardcaptor Sakura (ABS-CBN 2)
- Ultraman Gaia (ABS-CBN 2)
- Alias (ABS-CBN 2)
- Gingaman (ABS-CBN 2)
- Iris, The Happy Professor (ABS-CBN 2)
- E! News Daily (E! Philippines)
- Sons Of Thunder (RPN 9)
- ALF (ABC 5)
- F/X: The Series (ABC 5)
- High Tide (ABC 5)
- Maha Go! Go! Go! (Speed Racer X) (ABC 5)
- Police Academy: The Series (ABC 5)
- Restol (ABC 5)
- Sabrina: The Animated Series (ABC 5)
- Savage Dragon (ABC 5)
- Sentinel (ABC 5)
- Superman: The Animated Series (ABC 5)
- Transformers (ABC 5)
- Touched by an Angel (ABC 5)
- Wing Commander Academy (ABC 5)
- X-Men (ABC 5)
- Zorro (ABC 5)
- Zoboomafoo (Net 25)

== Networks ==
=== Rebranded ===
- June - Vid-OK → Myx
- October - Solar Entertainment → Solar USA and Solar Sports

== Births ==
- January 2 - Bea Borres, actress
- January 8 - Andrea Abaya, actress
- January 16 - Yukii Takahashi, actress
- January 26 - Janelle Lewis, actress
- January 28 - Janine Berdin, actress and singer
- February 7 - Bianca de Vera, actress and singer
- February 16 - Kirsten Gonzales, actress
- February 28 - Ylona Garcia, singer and actress
- March 3 - Chloe Redondo, singer
- March 16 - Franchesca Salcedo, actress
- March 17 - Raheel Byria, actor and model
- April 5 - Golden Cañedo, singer and actress
- April 9 - Sabine Cerrado, singer-songwriter
- April 29 - Karina Bautista, actress
- May 3 - KD Estrada, actor and singer
- May 15 - Shanaia Gomez, singer, host, actress and television personality
- May 16:
  - Shayne Sava, actress
  - Angela Ken, singer-songwriter and actress
- May 27 - Maloi Ricalde, singer and actress
- June 10 - Belle Mariano, actress
- June 20 – Gela Atayde, actress and dancer
- July 9 - Seth Fedelin, actor
- July 18 - Ogie Escanilla, actor and dancer
- August 6:
  - Bailey May, actor and singer
  - Angel Leighton, actress
- August 30 - Christine Joy De Guzman, actress
- August 31 - Gabb Skribikin, member of MNL48
- September 3:
  - Kyline Alcantara, actress and singer
  - Bugoy Cariño, actor
- September 15 - Hannah Arguelles, actress and model
- September 17 - Will Ashley, actor
- September 23 - Abdul Raman, actor
- September 24:
  - Anji Salvacion, actress and singer
  - Vince Crisostomo, actor
- September 25 - Daniela Stranner, actress
- October 5 - Dale Baldillo, actor and model
- November 15 - Mitzi Josh, actress and singer
- November 26 - Coleen Trinidad, member of MNL48
- December 7 - Sean Lucas, actor
- December 9 - Timothy Chan, actor
- December 13 - AC Bonifacio, dancer and actress
- December 15 - Chanty, member of Lapillus

== Deaths ==
- March 29: Rico Yan, Filipino matinee idol, model, film and television actor. acute hemorrhagic pancreatitis. (b. 1975)

== See also ==
- 2002 in television
