= List of all-time Shakey's V-League rankings =

The following is a table of where Shakey's V-League teams ranked throughout its run from 2004 to 2016.

== Team rankings ==
- As of the 10th Season of the respected league. Placing was used to determine the rankings of the schools that have not made the top 3 in any conference once.

Rank	Team	Attendance (out of 18)	Gold	Silver	Bronze	Total	Success Rate
1	Pocari Sweat Lady Warriors	2 (11.00%)	2	0	0	0	100.00%
1	UST Growling Tigresses	14 (67.67%)	6	4	2	11	50.00%
2	De La Salle Lady Archers	9 (38.89%)	3	1	1	5	42.86%
3	Adamson Lady Falcons	13 (70.588%)	2	2	4	8	15.38%
4	Ateneo Lady Eagles	18 (95.00%)	2	4	3	8	11.76%
5	San Sebastian Lady Stags	18 (88.235%)	1	7	3	11	5.88%
6	Philippine Army	4 (22.22%)	2	4	2	8	25.000%
7	Cagayan Valley Lady Rising Suns	2 (11.11%)	2	2	1	5	50.000%
8	NU Lady Bulldogs	7 (33.33%)	3	1	0	3	16.67%
9	FEU Lady Tamaraws	18 (94.44%)	1	0	3	4	5.88%
10	Vietsovpetro	1 (5.56%)	1	0	0	1	100%
11	Sandugo-San Sebastian Lady Conquerors	1 (5.56%)	1	0	0	1	100%.
12	Bureau of Customs Transformers	1 (5.56%)	0	1	0	0	0%
12	Smart-Maynilad	1 (5.56%)	0	1	0	1	0%
12	PLDT Home Telpad Turbo Boosters	1 (5.56%)	2	0	2	4	0%
13	Lyceum Lady Pirates	13 (72.22%)	0	0	3	3	0%
14-16	MAS Club	1 (5.56%)	0	0	1	1	0%
14-16	USLS Lady Stingers	3 (16.67%)	0	0	1	1	0%
14-16	Bali Pure Purest Water Defenders	2 (5.56%)	0	0	2	0	0%
14-16	Arellano Lady Chiefs	2(11.11%)	0	0	0	0	0%
17-26	De La Salle University-Dasmarinas Lady Patriots	1 (5.56%)	0	0	0	0	0%
17-26	Maynilad Water Dragons	1 (5.56%)	0	0	0	0	0%
17-26	PCU Dolphins	1 (5.56%)	0	0	0	0	0%
17-26	Philippine Air Force Airwomen	1 (5.56%)	0	0	0	0	0%
17-26	Philippine National Police Lady Patrollers	1 (5.56%)	0	0	0	0	0%
17-26	Philippine Navy Lady Sailors	1 (5.56%)	0	0	0	0	0%
17-26	Philippine Sports Commission Lady Legends	1 (5.56%)	0	0	0	0	0%
17-26	UE Lady Warriors	1 (5.56%)	0	0	0	0	0%
17-26	University of San Carlos Lady Warriors	1 (5.56%)	0	0	0	0	0%
27	UP Lady Maroons	5 (11.11%)	0	0	2	1	0%
28-29	SWU Lady Cobras	3 (16.67%)	0	0	0	0	0%
28-29	USJ–R Lady Jaguars	3 (16.67%)	0	0	0	0	0%
30	Perpetual Lady Altas	6 (33.33%)	0	0	0	0	0%
31	Benilde Lady Blazers	8 (44.44%)	0	0	0	0	0%
32-34	Davao Lady Agilas	1 (5.56%)	0	0	0	0	0%
32-34	Meralco Power Spikers	1 (5.56%)	0	0	0	0	0%
32-34	St. Louis University Lady Navigators	1 (5.56%)	0	0	0	0	0%
Rank	All-Star Team	Attendance (out of 1)	Gold	Silver	Bronze	Total	Success Rate
1	Smart All-Stars	1 (100.000%)	1	0	0	1	100%
2	Shakey's All-Stars	1 (100.000%)	0	0	0	0	0%
