= Rain or Shine Elasto Painters draft history =

Prior to the draft, they were allowed to carry over three players from their PBL team: Jay-R Reyes, Junjun Cabatu and Jay Sagad. Furthermore, they also took part in an expansion draft in which they were able to select three players from the other PBA teams who were not protected by their clubs, acquiring Rob Wainwright, Gilbert Lao and Denver Lopez in the process.

Abby Santos from the University of the Philippines, Diliman became the team's first draft choice, the 10th pick in the 2006 PBA Draft, although he was not signed by the team. The immediate next pick, his schoolmate Jireh Ibañes, was the first draftee to play for the team.

Just as with other expansion teams, Welcoat had a difficult first couple of seasons, allowing them to participate in the draft lottery. Like in the National Basketball Association (NBA) Draft, a draft lottery determined which team gets the first overall draft pick, but on a much smaller scale; only the two worst-performing teams in the preceding season participate. The team with the worst record had a 67% chance of clinching the #1 seed while the second-worst only gets a 33% chance.

In Rain or Shine's 17 seasons in the league, they were able to select two number one overall draft picks: Joe Devance from the University of Texas, El Paso and Gabe Norwood from George Mason University. Devance was awarded as a member of the league's all-rookie team in 2008, while Norwood was adjudged unanimously as the Rookie of the Year.

== Selections ==
Basketball positions
PG	Point guard
SG	Shooting guard
SF	Small forward
PF	Power forward
C	Center

Draft	Round	Pick	Player	Place of birth	Position	School
2006	1	10	Abby Santos	Philippines	SG	UP Diliman
2006	2	11	Jireh Ibañes	Philippines	SG	UP Diliman
2007	1	1	Joe Devance	United States	PF	UTEP
2007	2	12	Ryan Araña	Philippines	PG	De La Salle
2008	1	1	Gabe Norwood	United States	SF	George Mason
2008	2	12	Tyrone Tang	Philippines	PG	De La Salle
2009	1	5	Jervy Cruz	Philippines	C	UST
2009	2	14	Marcy Arellano	Philippines	SG	UE
2010	1	5	Josh Vanlandingham	United States	SG	Pacific Lutheran University
2010	2	15	RJ Jazul	Philippines	PG	Letran
2011	1	2	Paul Lee	Philippines	SG	UE
2012	1	7	Chris Tiu	Philippines	G	Ateneo
2012	3	27	Bacon Austria	Philippines	G/F	Ateneo
2012	4	34	Jewel Palomique	Philippines	F	Mapúa
2013	1	3	Raymond Almazan	Philippines	PF/C	Letran
2013	1	9	Alex Nuyles	Philippines	SG	Adamson
2013	2	12	Jeric Teng	Philippines	SG	UST
2013	2	19	Gayford Rodriguez	Philippines	SG	Visayas
2013	3	29	Ervic Vijandre	Philippines	SG	De La Salle
2014	1	2	Kevin Alas	Philippines	G	Letran
2014	1	9	Jericho Cruz	Philippines	G	Adamson
2014	2	14	Kevin Espinosa	Philippines	F/G	Mapúa
2014	2	21	Mike Gamboa	Philippines	G	UP Diliman
2015	1	3	Maverick Ahanmisi	United States	PG	Minnesota
2015	1	12	Josan Nimes	Philippines	SF	Mapúa
2015	2	15	Don Trollano	Philippines	SF	Adamson
2015	2	17	Simon Enciso	Philippines	PG	Notre Dame de Namur
2016	Special draft		Mike Tolomia	Philippines	G	FEU
2017	1	7	Ray Nambatac	Philippines	G	Letran
2017	2	19	Jomari Sollano	Philippines	F	Letran
2017	3	30	Michael Juico	Philippines	G	San Sebastian
2018	1	6	Javee Mocon	Philippines	F	San Beda
2018	1	8	JJ Alejandro	Philippines	G	NU
2018	2	13	Paul Varilla	Philippines	F	UE
2018	2	19	Robbie Manalang	Philippines	G	Adamson
2018	2	20	Harold Ng	Philippines	G	Adamson
2018	3	30	Kent Lao	Philippines	F	UST
2018	4	39	Al Josef Cariaga	Canada	G	Southern Alberta
2019	Special draft		Mike Nieto	Philippines	F	Ateneo
2019	1	5	Adrian Wong	United States	G	Ateneo
2019	1	6	Clint Doliguez	Philippines	F	San Beda
2019	1	7	Prince Rivero	Philippines	F	De La Salle
2019	2	19	Vince Tolentino	United States	F	Ateneo
2019	2	23	Wendell Comboy	Philippines	G	FEU
2019	3	30	Luke Parcero	Philippines	G	SFACS
2020 (S46)	1	5	Leonard Santillan	Philippines	F	De La Salle
2020 (S46)	2	17	Franky Johnson	United States	G	Warner Pacific
2020 (S46)	2	22	Anton Asistio	Philippines	G	Ateneo
2020 (S46)	2	23	Andrei Caracut	Philippines	G	De La Salle
2020 (S46)	3	29	Kenneth Mocon	Philippines	F	San Beda
2020 (S46)	4	40	RJ Argamino	Philippines	G	Benilde
2020 (S46)	5	50	Philip Manalang	Philippines	G	UE
2021 (S47)	1	5	Gian Mamuyac	Philippines	G	Ateneo
2021 (S47)	1	10	Shaun Ildefonso	Philippines	F	NU
2021 (S47)	2	17	Jhonard Clarito	Philippines	F	De Ocampo
2021 (S47)	2	18	RJ Ramirez	Canada	G	FEU
2021 (S47)	3	29	Rhaffy Octobre	Philippines	F	UV
2022 (S48)	1	3	Luis Villegas	United States	C	UE
2022 (S48)	1	4	Keith Datu	United States	F	Chico State
2022 (S48)	2	15	Henry Galinato	United States	C	UP Diliman
2022 (S48)	2	24	Adrian Nocum	Philippines	G	Mapúa
2022 (S48)	3	27	Sherwin Concepcion	Philippines	F	UST
2022 (S48)	4	38	JC Cullar	Italy	G	Benilde
2022 (S48)	5	49	Larry Arpia	Northern Mariana Islands	G	San Sebastian

=== Notes ===
1. All players entering the draft are Filipinos until proven otherwise.
