= Cabatu =

Cabatu is a surname. Notable people with the surname include:

- Junjun Cabatu (born 1984), Filipino basketball player
- Sonny Cabatu (born 1960), Filipino basketball player, father of Junjun
