= 1999–2000 Philippine Basketball League season =

1999–2000 PBL season
- Duration: March 13, 1999 – January 31, 2000
- Teams: 9 + 2
- TV partner: VTV (IBC)
- Season MVP: Don Allado; Paolo Mendoza
- 1st Yakult-PBL Challenge Cup champions: Welcoat Paints
- 1st Yakult-PBL Challenge Cup runners-up: Red Bull
- 2nd Yakult-PBL Challenge Cup champions: Welcoat Paints
- 2nd Yakult-PBL Challenge Cup runners-up: ANA Water Dispenser

Seasons
- ← 1998-99 2000-01 →

The 1999–2000 season of the Philippine Basketball League (PBL).

== Participating teams (coach) ==
- ANA Water Dispenser (Jimmy Mariano)
- Blu Detergent (Binky Favis, replaced by Nat Canson)
- Boom Laundry Master (Leo Isaac) *New team in the 2nd Challenge Cup
- Chowking Fastfood (Leo Austria)
- Colt 45 (Angelito Esguerra) *Left the league before the 2nd Challenge Cup
- Dazz Dishwashing Gel (Dong Vergeire)
- Montaña Jewels (Rex Manansala)
- Red Bull Energy Drink (Gil Lumberio)
- Welcoat Paints (Junel Baculi)

== 1999 (1st) Yakult-Challenge Cup ==
=== Semifinal standings ===
Qualified for finals

#	Teams	W	L	PCT	GB
1	Welcoat Paints	15	7	.681	--
2	Red Bull Energy Drink	15	7	.681	--
3	Chowking	15	7	.681	--
4	Colt 45	12	10	.545	3
5	Blu Detergent	8	14	.363	7

Eliminated from the semifinals were Dr.J/Ana, Dazz and Montana. Red Bull defeats Chowking in a playoff game to advance in the finals series against Welcoat, the Paint Masters made it first via superior quotient.

=== Finals ===
VTV

June 26

recap

Welcoat Paints 82, Red Bull Energy Drink 73

Makati Coliseum, Makati

VTV

June 28

recap

Welcoat Paints 72, Red Bull Energy Drink 71

Makati Coliseum, Makati

VTV

July 1

Welcoat Paints 80, Red Bull Energy Drink 74
Welcoat wins series, 3-0

Makati Coliseum, Makati

A torrid third-quarter run and tight defense down the stretch was all it took for Welcoat to win their PBL championship as it held off Red Bull, 80-74, to complete a three-game sweep as the Paint Masters finally stepped out of the shadows of the Asia Brewery franchise Stag Pale Pilsen / Tanduay, which dominated the league the past three years before the latter ascended to the PBA this year. It was coach Junel Baculi's first PBL title since steering Hapee Toothpaste to the Import-Reinforced Conference title in 1996.

== 1999 Vis-Min Cup ==
The Vis-Min Cup is not part of the PBL's regular conference. The special hoopfest took place starting on July 18 and the Mindanao games were held in Dapitan. Chowking and Blu Detergent fought for the Mindanao championship after finishing at number one and two in a group that includes Hapee Fil-Am, Dapitan Dolphins and PBL member Montaña Jewels.

In the Visayas tournament held in Mandaue, Cebu City, the three non-PBL entries that joined Red Bull and Welcoat are one-time PABL champion Lhuillier Jewelers, Upland Feeds and Team Chicago Bullets.

Chowking beat Blu Detergent for the Mindanao crown. The fastfood kings have captured the overall championship by topping Visayas champion Red Bull, 69-60, to win the special tournament. Chowking coach Leo Austria's charges includes Allen Patrimonio, Christian Nicdao, Joel Co, Roger Yap and Ronald Saracho. The Robert F. Kuan franchise completed a championship sweep of six straight wins.

== 1999-2000 (2nd) Yakult-Challenge Cup ==
=== Team standings ===
Qualified for quarterfinals

#	Group A	W	L	PCT	GB
1	Welcoat Paints	11	2	.847	--
2	Chowking	8	5	.615	3
3	Dazz Dishwashing Gel	6	7	.461	5
4	Boom Laundry Master	5	8	.384	6
5	Kendi Mint	4	9	.310	7

Chaz Perfume and Kendi Mint were guest teams.

#	Group B	W	L	PCT	GB
1	Red Bull Energy Drink	10	3	.770	--
2	ANA Water Dispenser	10	3	.770	--
3	Blu Detergent Kings	9	4	.692	1
4	Montaña Jewels	2	11	.153	8
5	Chaz Perfume	0	13	.000	10

The top four teams had a twice-to-beat advantage in the quarterfinal round, pairings were Welcoat-Kendi Mint, Ana-Boom, Red Bull-Dazz and Blu-Chowking.

Welcoat and Red Bull meet in a best-of-three semifinals series while the two other winners of the quarterfinals are Ana Water Dispenser and Blu Detergent. Welcoat and Ana prevailed, two games to one, in their respective series to set up a finals showdown.

=== Finals ===
VTV

January 27

recap

Welcoat Paints 65, ANA Water Dispenser 55

Makati Coliseum, Makati

VTV

January 29

recap

Welcoat Paints 83, ANA Water Dispenser 71

Makati Coliseum, Makati

VTV

January 31

Welcoat Paints 58, ANA Water Dispenser 56
Welcoat wins series, 3-0

Makati Coliseum, Makati

The Paint Masters recorded their second straight "sweet sweep" with a controversial 58-56 squeaker over hard-fighting Ana Water Dispenser. ANA's Paolo Mendoza hit an off-balance three-point shot with .4 second remaining, which was nullified by the referees, saying the foul was made by Welcoat's Yancy De Ocampo before the shot, the decision of the referees not to count Mendoza's shot was loudly booed by ANA followers, had it been counted will give Ana a hairline 59-58 lead and could have prevented an outright celebration by Welcoat.

=== Individual awards ===
- 2nd Challenge Cup:
- Most Valuable Player: Paolo Mendoza (ANA Water Dispenser)
- Top Newcomer: Roger Yap (Chowking)
- Most Improved Player Award: Yancy de Ocampo (Welcoat)
- Three Point King Award: Joel Co (Chowking)
- Finals MVP:
- Mythical First Team
  - Paolo Mendoza (ANA)
  - Jojo Manalo (Welcoat)
  - Marvin Ortiguerra (ANA)
  - Yancy De Ocampo (Welcoat)
  - Renren Ritualo (Welcoat)
- Mythical Second Team
  - Kerby Raymundo (Red Bull)
  - Allan Gamboa (ANA)
  - Melchor Crisostomo (Blu)
  - Ernesto Billones (Blu)
  - Anton Villoria (Welcoat)
