= UNTV Cup =

Filipino men's charity basketball league

- Current season, competition or edition: UNTV Cup Season 12
- Sport: Basketball
- Founded: July 29, 2013; 13 years ago
- Founder: Daniel Razon
- First season: 2013
- Commissioner: Atoy Co; Ed Cordero
- Claim to fame: The first charity basketball league of public servants
- Motto: Ang Liga ng Public Servants (lit. 'The League of Public Servants'); Win in Sports, Win for Charity
- No. of teams: Regular season: 12; Executive Face Off: 14; 3x3: 8
- Country: Philippines
- Most recent champions: Regular season: Agriculture Food Masters (2nd title); Executive Face Off: AFP Cavaliers (2nd title); 3x3: PITC Global Traders (2nd title); Off season: Alaska Milkmen (1st title)
- Most titles: Regular season: AFP Cavaliers (4 titles); Executive Face Off: AFP Cavaliers (2 titles); 3x3: PITC Global Traders (2 titles)
- Broadcaster: UNTV
- Website: www.untvweb.com/untvcup/

The UNTV Cup is a men's charity basketball league organized in the Philippines. Fourteen basketball teams represented by government agencies compete in the tournament.

The league's first game started on July 29, 2013, coinciding the 9th Anniversary Celebration of UNTV. As an amateur league, UNTV Cup is using the FIBA rules as its House Rules which is being used in world basketball and Olympics according to Mr. Raffy Britanico, officiating head of Samahang Basketbol ng Pilipinas (SBP), a basketball association in the Philippines.

Its first season was held at the Smart-Araneta Coliseum in Quezon City, Philippines. Fortunato Co serves as the commissioner of the basketball league. Following the success of its first season, UNTV Cup season two was opened on February 11, 2014, at the same venue with newly added public service booths of each participating teams/government agencies. An off-season game was opened on August 21, 2014, with the three branches of the Philippine government: Judiciary, Legislative an Executive teams. Also with Media Team (Team ni Kuya) will also play to complete the set of players.

UNTV Cup is an original concept by Daniel Razon tagged as Mr. Public Service and materialized by UNTV widely known as public service television station in the Philippines. He is the chairman and CEO of BMPI-UNTV, the organization behind the UNTV Cup.

Regular games are usually held at the Paco Arena in Manila City and Novadeci Convention Center in Quezon City, with a live telecast on the UNTV Public Service channel every Sunday and Thursday afternoon.

== Competition format ==
=== Regular season ===
==== Elimination rounds ====
UNTV Cup's regular season runs from September or October to March of the following year. Regardless of the number of teams, they are divided into two groups for the first round of eliminations. Each team will face all other teams in the same group once. After all the first-round games are played, the bottom two teams of both groups are eliminated for the season, and the remaining teams advance to the second round of eliminations.

All teams that advanced are combined into one group, and there will be a crossover where each team will play against all the teams they were not grouped with in the first round. After the single round robin games in the second phase of eliminations, the bottom two teams will be eliminated for the season, and the remaining teams qualify for the playoffs.

If teams have identical win-loss records in the standings, regardless of the phase of the competition, the official tiebreaker procedure is as follows:

1. Largest point differential in head-to-head matches among tied teams
2. Winner of head-to-head matches among tied teams

==== Playoffs ====
The top two teams in the standings advance to the semifinals, while the remaining teams play each other again once in the quarterfinals. The two teams at the top of the standings after the round robin quarterfinals goes to the semifinals, while the other teams are eliminated.

In the semifinals, the matchups are #1 versus #4 and #2 versus #3, where the higher seeds have a twice-to-beat advantage. The semifinal winners will then meet in the best-of-three Finals, while the semifinal losers will play for a third-place game.

The first team to get two wins in the Finals are declared champions and get the largest money to donate to their chosen beneficiaries.

=== Executive Face Off ===
The Executive Face Off usually does not coincide with the regular season, and it runs from May to July. The duration is shorter due to fewer entrants than the regular tournament, and so the teams are considered as one group. All teams will play a single round robin where they face each other team once.

After the elimination round games, only the top four teams will advance to the semifinals, where #1 meets #4 and #2 plays #3. The higher seeds will have a twice-to-beat advantage. The semifinal winners will then meet in the best-of-three Finals for a chance to get the championship and the biggest money to give to their chosen beneficiaries.

== Teams ==
The UNTV Cup started in 2013 with 7 teams. The number of teams differ by season since government agencies voluntarily apply. Each season, participating teams are divided into two groups for the elimination round, but it is not publicly revealed how the selection process for groups is performed.

Government agencies are urged to join and will not have to pay a joining fee. Instead, the teams are given free uniforms by the league, and beneficiaries are given the prize whatever round the teams finished.

For the Executive Face Off editions, players must be executives aged 40 years old and above.

Including Season 12, there have been 26 teams in the history of the league.

=== Active teams ===
As of 2026

Government agency(ies)	Moniker	First season	Seasons played	Head coach
Armed Forces of the Philippines (Note: The AFP is represented by its three branches: the Philippine Army, the Philippine Air Force, and the Philippine Navy.)	AFP Cavaliers	2013	12	Jeffrey Quiambao
Commission on Elections	COMELEC Vanguards	2023	3	Atty. Jan Ale Fajardo
Department of Environment and Natural Resources	DENR Warriors/Lawin Patrollers	2019	5	Atty. Norlito Eneran
Department of Justice	DOJ Hunters/Avengers/Justice Boosters/Beacons/Radiance	2013 (Note: DOJ played on the first seven seasons of the league and re-joined on 2023 (Season 10) after a 2-season absence.)	10	Gerry Esplana
Government Service Insurance System	GSIS Furies	2014	10	Arvin Bonleon
Supreme Court of the Philippines	Judiciary Cagers/Magis	2013	12	Gilbert Malabanan
National Housing Authority	NHA Builders/Home Masters	2014	10	Sherwin Crisostomo
Office of the Ombudsman	Ombudsman Graft Busters	2015	9	Danny Florano
Office of the President	OP Bagong Pilipinas (formerly Malacañang-PSC Patriots/Kamao & OP-PMS Trailblazers)	2014	10	Khasim Mirza
Philippine Health Insurance Corporation	PhilHealth Advocates/Your Partner In Health/Plus/Konsulta/Health Insurers	2013 (Note: PhilHealth played on the first two seasons of the league, and re-joined on 2018 (Season 7) after a 4-season absence. Their second stint lasted for three seasons.)	7	Ronald Louie Laruscain
Philippine National Police	PNP Hinirangs/Responders	2013	12	Harold Sta. Cruz
Senate of the Philippines	Senate Defenders	2014 (Note: Senate played for 6 seasons since joining the league in 2014 (Season 2), and re-joined on 2022 (Season 9) after a 1-season absence due to the concluded 2019 senatorial election.)	10	Japs Cuan

=== Defunct teams ===
Government agency(ies)	Moniker	Years joined	Seasons played	W–L record	Win%	Playoff appearances
Bureau of Customs	BOC Transformers	2016–2017	1	–		1
Bureau of Fire Protection	BFP Firefighters	2014–2018	4	–		2
Bureau of Jail Management and Penology	BJMP Greyhounds	2024–2025	1	–		0
Commission on Audit	COA Enablers	2017–2018	1	0–6	.000	0
Congress of the Philippines and Local Government Units (Note: Despite the similar name, the agency Department of the Interior and Local Government (DILG) was not officially represented in the UNTV Cup.)	Congress-LGU Legislators	2013	1	2–5	.286	1
Department of Agriculture	Agriculture Food Masters	2017–2025	6	–		3
Department of Foreign Affairs	DFA Emissaries	2023–2025	2	–		0
Department of Health	DOH Health Achievers	2017–2018	1	1–5	.167	0
House of Representatives	HOR Solons	2014–2017	4	–		0
Local Government Units	LGU Vanguards	2014	1	3–5	.375	0
Metropolitan Manila Development Authority	MMDA Equalizers/Black Wolves	2013–2017	5	–		3
Philippine Drug Enforcement Agency	PDEA Drug Busters	2017–2018	1	2–8	.200	0
Philippine International Trading Corporation	PITC Global Traders	2018–2020	2	–		2
Social Security System	SSS Kabalikat	2019–2025	4	–		1

=== Timeline ===
As of October 30, 2023, there have been 25 teams in the history of the UNTV Cup. There were also interested agencies such as the Philippine Coast Guard (for Season 2), PhilHealth and MTRCB (for Season 10), but reasons were undisclosed why they were not in the lineup of teams.

== Championships ==
=== Regular season ===
The Armed Forces of the Philippines Cavaliers have the most UNTV Cup titles, winning 4 championships in the regular season. The second most successful team is the Judiciary Cagers/Magis and Agriculture Food Masters, who both have 2 championships. The DENR Warriors (now DENR Lawin Patrollers), PNP Responders, and Senate Defenders won 1 title each, with DENR holding the distinction of being the only first-year team to claim the trophy. Malacañang-PSC Patriots/Kamao (now OP Bagong Pilipinas) is the only team that reached multiple finals but have not yet won a championship.

Teams that competed in the finals

Teams	Win	Loss	Total	Win%	Year(s) won	Year(s) lost
AFP Cavaliers	4	1	5	.800	2014, 2016, 2019, 2023	2020
Judiciary Cagers/Magis	2	1	3	.667	2013, 2015	2023
Agriculture Food Masters	2	0	2	1.000	2024, 2025	
DENR Warriors (now DENR Lawin Patrollers)	1	0	1	1.000	2020	
Senate Defenders	1	1	2	.500	2018	2019
PNP Hinirangs/Responders	1	3	4	.250	2017	2013, 2014, 2016
SSS Kabalikat	0	1	1	.000		2024
Ombudsman Graft Busters	0	1	1	.000		2025
Malacañang-PSC Patriots/Kamao (now OP Bagong Pilipinas)	0	3	3	.000		2015, 2017, 2018

Current teams that have no UNTV Cup Finals appearances

- Commission on Elections (COMELEC Vanguards)
- Department of Justice (DOJ Hunters/Avengers/Justice Boosters/Beacons/Radiance)
- Government Service Insurance System (GSIS Furies)
- National Housing Authority (NHA Builders/Home Masters)
- Philippine Health Insurance Corporation (PhilHealth Advocates/Your Partner In Health/Plus/Konsulta/Health Insurers)

Defunct teams that had no UNTV Cup Finals appearances

- Bureau of Customs (BOC Transformers)
- Bureau of Fire Protection (BFP Firefighters)
- Bureau of Jail Management and Penology (BJMP Greyhounds)
- Commission on Audit (COA Enablers)
- Congress-LGU Legislators
- Department of Foreign Affairs (DFA Emissaries)
- Department of Health (DOH Health Achievers)
- House of Representatives (HOR Solons)
- Local Government Unit (LGU Vanguards)
- Metropolitan Manila Development Authority (MMDA Equalizers/Black Wolves)
- Philippine Drug Enforcement Agency (PDEA Drug Busters)
- Philippine International Trading Corporation (PITC Global Traders)

=== Executive Face Off ===
There have been four Executive Face Off tournaments in the history of the league. The Clash of the Three was the precursor for the succeeding Executive Face Off tournaments, and in effect, Team Judiciary is included in the official list of Executive Face Off champions. The 2018 PNP Executives team is the only squad that achieved a perfect season, whether regular season or off season.

The Executive Face Off tournament usually commences after the regular season. In 2023, the Executive Face Off games are held during the same game days with the regular tournament, making it the first time that the regular season and Executive Face Off tournaments are simultaneous.

Tournament	Champion	Result	Runner-up	Ref.
Clash of the Three 2014	Team Judiciary	–	Team Legislators	
Executive Face Off 2017	AFP Cavaliers	75–71 (OT)	PNP Responders	
Executive Face Off 2018	PNP Responders	81–53	Ombudsman Graft Busters	
Executive Face Off 2023	Senate Sentinels	81–72	PNP Responders	
Executive Face Off 2025	AFP Cavaliers	2–0	Judiciary Magis	

=== PBA Legends Face-Off ===
There has been one off season tournament where PBA teams, represented by their former players who are retired at the time the games were held, have played in the UNTV Cup for charity, dubbed as the PBA Legends Face-Off. The only edition happened on 2019, where the Alaska Milkmen became champions among 4 participating teams.

Tournament	Champion	Result	Runner-up	Ref.
PBA Legends Face-Off 2019	Alaska Milkmen	77–75	San Miguel Beermen	

=== 3x3 (Tatluhan) ===
There have been two editions of the 3x3 tournament, and both instances are won by the PITC Global Traders. Games are held as opener for UNTV Cup Finals.

Season	Champion	Result	Runner-up	Ref.
Season 7	PITC Global Traders	15–13	Malacañang-PSC Kamao	
Season 8	PITC Global Traders	14–13	PhilHealth Plus	

== Beneficiaries ==
From Season 1 to Season 6, including the three off season tournaments, UNTV Cup has given a total of ₱35 million to the beneficiaries of the participating teams.

For Season 9 alone, a total of 8.1 million pesos was granted to all the teams' beneficiaries tax-free.

Team	Beneficiaries	Total cash prize
Senate Defenders	Kythe Foundation, Inc., Pangarap Foundation, Inc., and Tahanang Mapagpala Immaculada Concepcion, Inc.	at least ₱6 million
AFP Cavaliers	AFP Educational Benefit System Office (AFP-EBSO)	at least ₱5 million
Judiciary Cagers/Magis	Court Employees Severely Affected by Typhoons and Calamities	at least ₱4 million
Malacañan-PSC Patriots/Kamao	Philippine Children's Medical Center and Millenium Sports Support System Association Inc.	at least ₱2 million
NHA Builders	NHA Provident Fund Association, Inc.	at least ₱1,500,000
PNP Hinirangs/Responders	Public Assistance for Rescue, Disaster and Support Services (PARDSS) Foundation International, Inc.	at least ₱1,100,000
Skywalker Exhibition Game	Samboy Lim and family	₱1,000,000
BOC Transformers	Caritas Manila, Inc.	₱600,000
Ombudsman Graft Busters	Ombudsman Provident Fund	at least ₱500,000
MMDA Black Wolves	Neonatal ICU – PGH	at least ₱150,000
PhilHealth Advocates/Plus/Konsulta	PhilHealth Provident Fund	at least ₱150,000
DOJ Hunters/Justice Boosters	Department of Justice Employees’ Association (DOJEA)	at least ₱100,000
GSIS Furies	Kapisanan ng mga Manggagawa sa GSIS	at least ₱100,000
BFP Firefighters	Philippine Science High School Foundation Inc.	at least ₱100,000
Agriculture Food Masters	Don Bosco Foundation for Sustainable Development, Tibao Farmer Dreamers Association	₱200,000
COA Enablers	Caritas Novaliches, Inc.	₱100,000
DOH Health Achievers	Dr. Gerry Cunanan Mindanao Heart Foundation, and Kapwa Ko Mahal Ko	₱100,000
PDEA Drug Busters	Confederation of Community Oriented Policing System NGOs, (CCOPS-NGOs) Inc.	₱100,000
PITC Global Traders	Blas F. Ople Policy Center and Training Institute, Bahay Pagasa of Biñan, and Mga Munting Hiling Foundation Inc.	₱100,000

== Venues ==
Since the UNTV Cup does not implement a home-and-away system, there have been varying venues throughout the years. The Smart Araneta Coliseum is the only venue that the league has played at least one game every season.

Venues of UNTV Cup
Metro Manila	Calabarzon
UNTV Cup venues in Metro Manila	UNTV Cup venues in Calabarzon

Arena	Location	Tournament			Capacity
Arena	Location	Seasons	Elims	Playoffs	Capacity
Alonte Sports Arena	Biñan, Laguna	5	check		6,500
Filoil EcoOil Centre	San Juan City	10	check		6,000
Gatorade Hoops Center	Mandaluyong City	7	check		300
GSIS Gymnasium	Pasay City	7	check		
JCSGO Gym	Quezon City	6, 7	check		2,000
Makati Coliseum	Makati City	3	check		12,000
Mall of Asia Arena	Pasay City	3, 4, 5, 8	check		20,000
Meralco Gym	Pasig City	2, 6, 7	check	check	
Ninoy Aquino Stadium	Manila City	10	check		6,000
Novadeci Convention Center	Quezon City	9, 10	check	check	2,000
Olivarez Sports Center	Parañaque City	6	check		3,500
Paco Arena	Manila City	8, 9, 10	check	check	
Pasig City Sports Center	Pasig City	1, 5, 6, 7, 8	check	check	3,000
Philippine Navy Gym	Taguig City	1	check		
PhilSports Arena	Pasig City	9, 10	check	check	10,000
San Juan Gym	San Juan City	8	check		2,000
Smart Araneta Coliseum	Quezon City	1, 2, 3, 4, 5, 6, 7, 8, 9, 10 (Note: The Smart Araneta Coliseum is the only venue that the league has played at least one game every season.)	check	check	14,429
Strike Gymnasium	Bacoor, Cavite	5	check		1,500
Treston International College Gym	Taguig City	1	check	check	
University of Makati Gym	Taguig City (Note: The University of Makati was located in Makati City when UNTV Cup games were played at the venue in 2014 and 2016. Since 2023, UMak is geographically located in Taguig City.)	3, 5	check		
Upper Deck Sports Center	Pasig City	6	check		
Ynares Sports Arena	Pasig City	1, 2, 3, 4, 5	check	check	3,000

== Seasons and off-seasons ==
=== Regular seasons ===
==== Season 1 (2013) ====
UNTV Cup started its first season with a ceremonial toss on July 29, 2013, and it was expected to end in January 2014 but it ended early on November 5 of the same year. The project is aimed to promote unity, camaraderie and physical fitness among government officials in the country. Judiciary team was the winner of the season. The prize was given to the Victims of calamities in Central Visayas and war in Southern Philippines.

==== Season 2 (2014) ====
UNTV Cup season two started its ceremonial toss last February 11, 2014, at the Smart Araneta Coliseum, Quezon City with additional three teams to come up with a total of ten teams. Atoy Co and Ed Cordero serve as commissioner and deputy commissioner respectively during the course of UNTV Cup season two. The game ended successfully on July 8, 2014, on the same venue. AFP Cavaliers was the winning team on this season. The prize was given to its charity AFP Educational Benefit System Office (AFPEBSO).

==== Season 3 (2014–15) ====
UNTV Cup Season 3 opened last October 2014 as previously announced but the said event was opened on November 17, 2014, at SM Mall of Asia Arena. It was ended on April 28, 2015, in its final games at the Smart-Araneta Coliseum in Quezon City, Metro Manila, Philippines. Aside from existing teams, newcomers are Bureau of Fire Protection (BFP Firefighters), Government Service Insurance System (GSIS Furies) and National Housing Authority (NHA Builders) to complete the eleven teams of the UNTV Cup Season 3. Judiciary Magis was the season's winner. The prize was donated to the Supreme Court employees who are sick or injured while on duty.

==== Season 4 (2015–16) ====
A total of 12 teams, including new team Ombudsman Graft Busters were competed in the UNTV Cup Season 4. AFP Cavaliers and PNP Responders were competed in a best-of-three finals series, of which the AFP clinched the championship title of Season 4. AFP Cavaliers was the champion during the season.

==== Season 5 (2016–17) ====
The Season 5 of the UNTV Cup started on August 29, 2016, at the Mall of Asia Arena. There were 13 teams, including defending champions AFP Cavaliers and new team Bureau of Customs Transformers, will compete for a chance to win the championship of the 5th season of the public service-based basketball tournament. PNP Responders was the winning team on this season.

==== Season 6 (2017–18) ====
The Season 6 of the UNTV Cup started on September 12, 2017, at the Smart Araneta Coliseum, Quezon City, and concluded at the same venue on March 12, 2018. Fourteen teams competed for a chance to win the championship of the public service-based basketball tournament. Senate Defenders defeated Malacañan-PSC Kamao on the Finals, 2 games to zero.

==== Season 7 (2018–19) ====
The 2018–2019 season was the 7th season of the UNTV Cup. The opening games was held on September 3, 2018, at the Smart Araneta Coliseum, Quezon City, and are expected to conclude in March 2019.

==== Season 8 (2019–20) ====
The season officially opened on September 9, 2019, at the Mall of Asia Arena in Pasay. During the opening, it was unveiled that the total cash donation was over 50 million pesos to different charity groups since 2013.

==== Season 10 (2023–24) ====
The tenth season of the league opened on October 30, 2023, at the Smart Araneta Coliseum, in Quezon City. A total of fourteen (14) teams participated in this season, which included twelve returning teams from the previous season, and two new additional teams in COMELEC Vanguards and DFA Emissaries. Agriculture Food Masters won the championship defeating the SSS Kabalikat to claim their first-ever championship in their history, as both teams are first timers to compete in the UNTV Cup Finals.

=== Off-seasons ===
==== Clash of the Three (2014) ====
UNTV Cup Off Season, officially called as the UNTV Cup off-season games: Clash of Three (spelled TH3EE or th3ee where 3 represents letter R), was a basketball games among the three branches of the Philippine Government namely: the Judiciary, the Legislative, and Executives teams. Non-earning point Media Team (Team ni Kuya) also play the off-season game to complete the set of players. The off-season game was started on August 21, 2014, at Ynares Sports Arena, Pasig, Metro Manila, Philippines and ended its final games on October 14, 2014. Judiciary team was the winner of the season. The prize was given to Children In Conflict with the Law (CICL).

==== Executive Face Off 2017 ====
The first edition of Executive Face Off kicked off on May 21, 2017, at the Pasig Sports Complex. Its aim was to give executives of the Philippine government's various branches a time for relaxation, renewing acquaintance and showcasing of talents. AFP Cavaliers was the winning team during this off-season game on its final games on July 10, 2017. The prize was given to the AFP's Educational Benefit System Office which grants scholarship to orphans and children of soldiers killed and wounded in action.

==== Executive Face Off 2018 ====
The second year of the Executive Face Off began on May 6, 2018, at the Pasig Sports Complex. Eight teams, including previous off-season champion AFP Cavaliers, will compete in the tournament and give aid to their beneficiaries.

==== PBA Legends Face-Off 2019 ====
The PBA Legends Face-Off was the 4th off-season tournament of the league. It is the first off-season games that featured PBA teams (although composed of alumni players), and a follow-up to the successful reunion charity event PBA Legends: Return of the Rivals on February 17, 2019. The month-long tournament officially opened on June 2, 2019, at the Pasig City Sports Complex, with four teams vying for the championship title. The lone beneficiary for this off season is the PBA Legends Foundation, for the benefit of former professional basketball players who are either sick or in need of financial help. ₱2,000,000 total was donated by all four teams.

The finals game was held on July 8, 2019, at the Smart Araneta Coliseum. It was between the undefeated San Miguel Beermen and #2 team Alaska Milkmen. Alaska escaped San Miguel on a close battle, 77–75, to get the championship.

=== 3x3 tournaments ===
On March 11, 2019, the first 3x3 tournament in the history of the league served as opener for the Game 2 of the Season 7 Finals. The four non-finals playoff teams participated in the knockout games. PITC Global Traders were crowned champions by defeating Malacanang-PSC Kamao in the final, taking home ₱20,000 prize.

The second 3x3 edition started on March 1, 2020, dubbed as Tatluhan. All eight non-semifinals teams participate in the pocket tournament, which opened for the Season 8 Finals.

== Records ==
=== Individual game records ===
==== Points ====
- Most points in a game

- 67 by Kenneth Aljard, OP-PMS Trailblazers (vs. DOJ Beacons) on December 12, 2023

== Kit Providers ==
The league has had different outfitters throughout the years.

Season	Kit Provider
	Jersey Haven
Season 8	Kickstand Sportswear
Season 10	Kalos PH Sportswear

== Awards ==
Year	Association	Category	Nominee(s)	Result
2014	AnakTV	AnakTV Seal Award	UNTV Cup	Awarded
2016	AnakTV	AnakTV Seal Award	UNTV Cup	Awarded
2017	AnakTV	AnakTV Seal Award	UNTV Cup	Awarded
2019	AnakTV	AnakTV Seal Award	UNTV Cup	Awarded
2023	AnakTV	AnakTV Seal Award	UNTV Cup	Awarded
