= St. Vincent School =

Private school in the Philippines

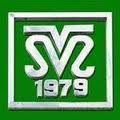
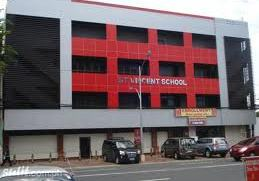
- Main Campus along West Avenue

Location
- Main - West Avenue Quezon City, Philippines; Branch - Maginhawa Street, Teacher's Village, Quezon City, Philippines
- 14°38′58.73″N 121°1′41.81″E

Information
- Type: Private nonsectarian
- Established: 1979
- Grades: K-12
- Color: Green

St. Vincent School is a private, non-sectarian school located in West Avenue, Quezon City, Manila which offers preschool, grade school and high school. Its Teacher's Village campus offers only preschool and grade school.

St. Vincent was opened in 1979, and is named in honor of Saint Vincent Ferrer.

== Notable alumni ==
- Junjun Cabatu⁣ — professional basketball player
- Angelica Panganiban ⁣— actress
- Paula Peralejo⁣ — actress
- Rufa Mae Quinto — actress and comedian
