= 2004 PBA draft =

Player selection in Philippine basketball

General information
- Date: January 18, 2004
- Time: 4:00 pm
- Location: Glorietta Activity Center, Makati
- Network: ABC

Overview
- League: Philippine Basketball Association
- First selection: Rich Alvarez (Shell Turbo Chargers)

The 2004 Philippine Basketball Association (PBA) rookie draft was an event at which teams drafted players from the amateur ranks. It was held on January 18, 2004 at the Glorietta Mall at Makati City. This is the last draft to be held within a calendar year.

== Round 1 ==
*	Mythical team member	^{#}	All-star

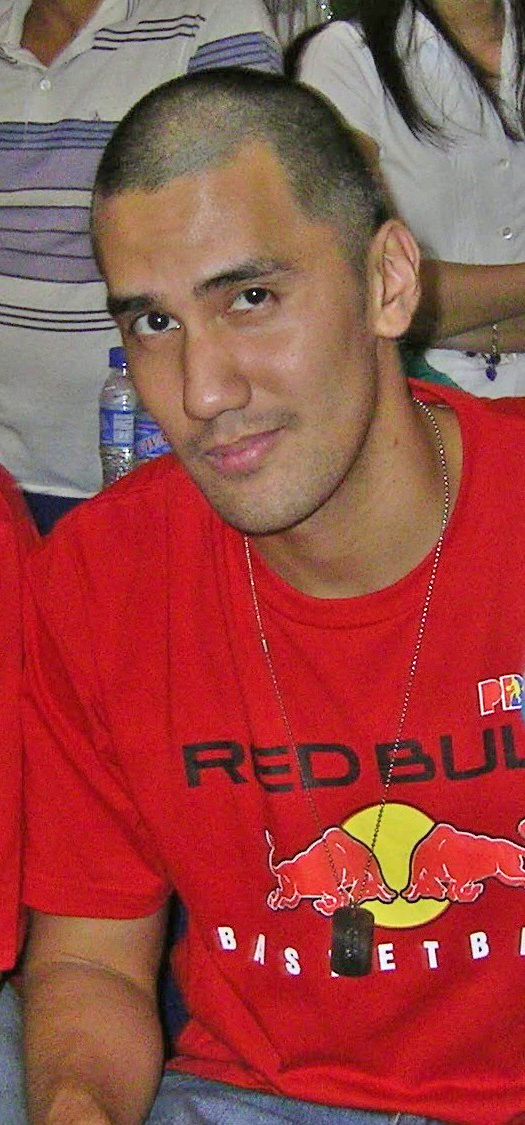
Rich Alvarez, 1st pick by Shell

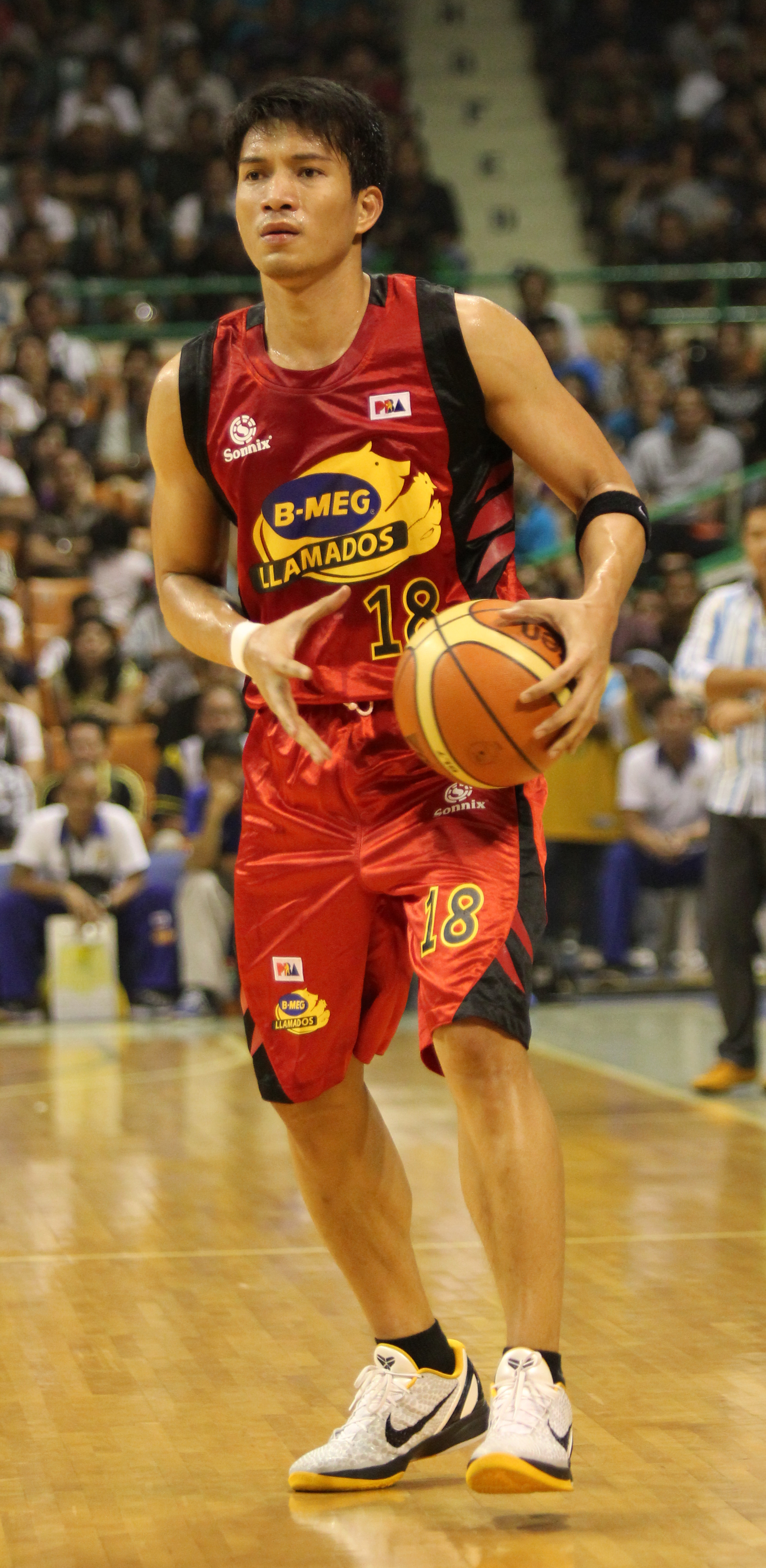
James Yap, 2nd pick by Purefoods

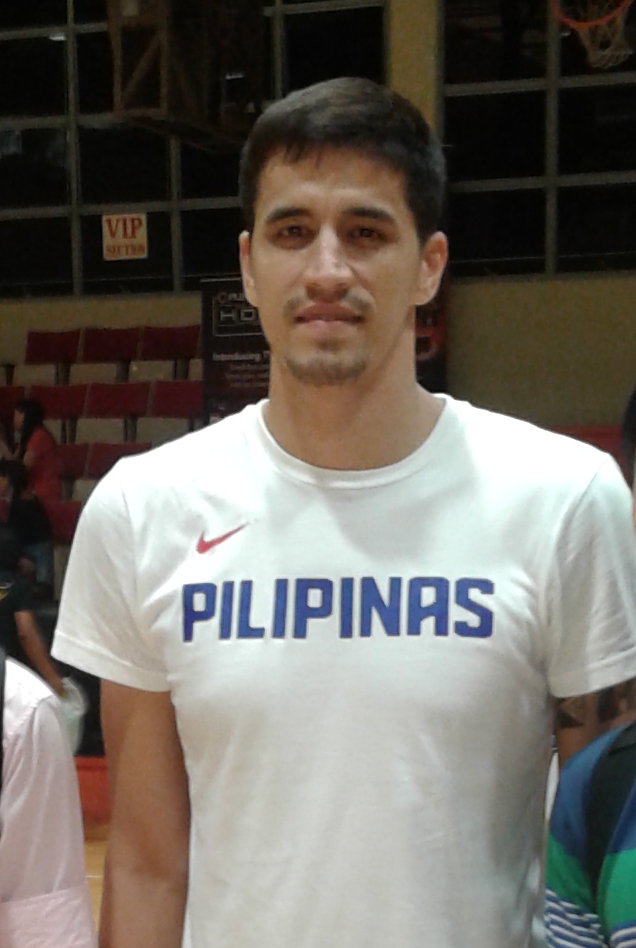
Marc Pingris, the 3rd pick by FedEx

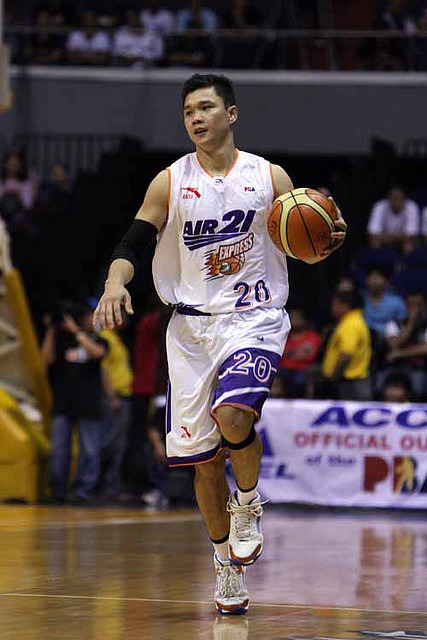
Gary David, the 10th pick by Coca-Cola/Coke

Pick	Player	Country of origin*	PBA team	College
1	Rich Alvarez^{#}	Philippines	Shell Turbo Chargers	Ateneo
2	James Yap*	Philippines	Purefoods Tender Juicy Hotdogs	UE
3	Marc Pingris*	Philippines	FedEx Express	PSBA
4	Ranidel de Ocampo^{*}	Philippines	FedEx Express	St. Francis
5	Sonny Thoss*	Papua New Guinea	Alaska Aces	James Cook
6	Denver Lopez	United States	Red Bull Thunder	Cal State Fullerton
7	Ervin Sotto	Philippines	Purefoods TJ Hotdogs (to Shell via San Miguel Beermen)	St. Francis
8	Nelbert Omolon*	Philippines	Sta. Lucia Realtors	PCU
9	Wesley Gonzales	Philippines	FedEx Express	Ateneo
10	Gary David^{*}	Philippines	Coca-Cola Tigers	Lyceum

== Round 2 ==
*	Mythical team member	^{#}	All-star

Pick	Player	Country of origin*	PBA team	College
11	Paul Artadi^{#}	Philippines	Purefoods Tender Juicy Hotdogs	UE
12	Carlo Sharma	Philippines	Shell Turbo Chargers	De La Salle
13	Kim Valenzuela	United States	Sta. Lucia Realtors	Cuyamaca
14	Niño Gelig	Philippines	Talk 'N Text Phone Pals	UST
15	Willy Wilson	Philippines	Alaska Aces	De La Salle
16	Francis Mercado	Philippines	Red Bull Thunder	San Beda
17	Ronald Cuan	Philippines	Sta. Lucia Realtors	De La Salle
18	Christopher Guerrero	Philippines	Talk 'N Text Phone Pals	USP
19	Manny Ramos	Philippines	Coca-Cola Tigers	De La Salle

San Miguel Beermen passed on this round.

== Round 3 ==
Pick	Player	Country of origin*	PBA team	College
20	Theodore Hawkins, Jr	United States	Barangay Ginebra Kings	Cosumnes
21	Manuel Huelar	Philippines	FedEx Express	USJ-R
22	Bernzon Franco	Philippines	Alaska Aces	PCU
23	Epok Quimpo	Philippines	Talk 'N Text Phone Pals	Ateneo
24	Rhagnee Sinco	Philippines	Coca-Cola Tigers	FEU

Red Bull Thunder, San Miguel Beermen and Sta. Lucia Realtors passed on this round.

== Round 4 ==
Pick	Player	Country of origin*	PBA team	College
25	Niño Bien Marquez	Philippines	FedEx Express	PMI
26	Eric dela Cuesta	Philippines	Alaska Aces	ACT (Cebu)
27	Warren Ybañez	Philippines	Coca-Cola Tigers	PSBA

Purefoods Tender Juicy Hotdogs, Shell Turbo Chargers, Barangay Ginebra Kings, Red Bull Thunder, Sta. Lucia Realtors and Talk 'N Text Phone Pals passed on this round.

== Undrafted players ==
Draftee's name followed by college. All undrafted players become rookie free agents.

- Nurjamjam Alfad (San Sebastian)
- Francis Arabit (Letran)
- Julius Binuya
- Arnold Booker (UE)
- Joselito Celiz
- Tristan Codamon (Adamson)
- Jay-R Estrada (UE)
- Nicholas Joseph Fasano (Mesa)
- John Flores
- Lou Gatumbato (St. Benilde)
- Arvin Garcia (San Antonio)
- Lyndon Lagat from (DeVry)
- Jessie Lumantas from (Southwestern)
- Steve Marucot from (Mapua)
- Alvin Pua from (San Sebastian)
- Mario Reyes
- Richard Michael from (Sydney)
- Rommel Sungcap

== Note ==
* All players are Filipinos until proven otherwise.

== See also ==
- 2004 PBA Fiesta Conference
- 2004–05 PBA season
