= Bureau of Customs Transformers =

The Bureau of Customs Transformers may refer to:

- Bureau of Customs Transformers (basketball)
- Bureau of Customs Transformers (volleyball)
