= 2002 in Norwegian television =

This is a list of Norwegian television related events from 2002.

== Events ==
- January – The channel Viasat Explore launches.
- 2 June – Veronica Agnes Roso wins the second series of Big Brother Norway.
- Unknown – Ronny Inderberg, performing as Garth Brooks wins the sixth and final series of Stjerner i sikte.

== Television shows ==
=== 2000s ===
- Big Brother Norway (2001–2003, 2011)

== Ending this year ==
- Stjerner i sikte (1996–2002)

== Networks and services ==
=== Launches ===
Network	Type	Launch date	Notes	Source
Viasat Explorer	Cable television	January		
ZTV Norway	Cable television	1 January		

=== Closures ===
Network	Type	End date	Notes	Sources
Metropol TV	Cable and satellite	27 February		

== See also ==
- 2002 in Norway
