= Bureau of Customs Transformers (basketball) =

- Leagues: UNTV Cup (2016)
- Founded: 2016
- Team colors
- Team manager: Ed Bundoc; Mark Mabazza
- Head coach: Kenneth Duremdes
- Ownership: Bureau of Customs
- Website: https://www.untvweb.com/untvcup/?teams=boc-transformers

The Bureau of Customs Transformers was a basketball team currently that competed in the UNTV Cup Season 5. The Transformers were the newest team to be participate in the UNTV Cup, a public service-based basketball tournament in the Philippines. The team was supported by BOC Commissioners Nicanor Faeldon, that aims to beef up the bureau's campaign on the image transformation to the public from being the corrupted and controversial government agency to one of the most-efficient and transparent agencies to date. The team had one appearance before it was folded in 2017.

The team's roster will were reinforced by PBA legend and former Senate Defenders player Kenneth Duremdes as their playing coach, together with former PBA players Marlou Aquino and Gherome Ejercito.

On September 11, 2016, the Transformers won their first assignment against GSIS Furies, 76-74, in their encounter held at the Pasig City Sports Center. Aquino led the team's top scorers with 12 points.

Aside from the basketball team, a volleyball team also called as the BOC Transformers was introduced in the 13th Shakey's V-League Reinforced Conference.

== See also ==
- Bureau of Customs
