= Niño Gelig =

Filipino basketball player

Personal information
- Born: October 29, 1980 (age 46) Mabalacat, Pampanga, Philippines
- Listed height: 6 ft 2 in (1.88 m)
- Listed weight: 170 lb (77 kg)

Career information
- College: UST
- PBA draft: 2004: 2nd round, 14th overall pick
- Drafted by: Talk 'N Text Phone Pals
- Playing career: 2004–2012
- Position: Shooting guard / small forward
- Number: 9

Career history
- 2004–2006: Talk 'N Text Phone Pals
- 2006–2008: Welcoat Dragons
- 2008–2012: Alaska Aces

Niño Greggy Batayola Gelig (born October 29, 1980) is a Filipino former professional basketball player in the Philippine Basketball Association (PBA). He was drafted 14th overall by Talk 'N Text in 2004.

== Player profile ==
Gelig played for the Talk N' Text Phone Pals in the 2005-06 PBA season and improved his scoring average from 4.4 points per game to 6.1 points per game as he plays for the Welcoat Dragons. He played 35 games for Welcoat and had 9 starts and was given 16.4 minutes per game. He was released at the end of the 2007-08 PBA season. He was signed by Alaska and will be reunited with his college teammate Cyrus Baguio.
