= Shark Energy =

Thai energy drink

- Type: Energy drink
- Introduced: 1998; 28 years ago
- Ingredients: Caffeine, taurine, glucuronolactone
- Variants: SHARK Energy Drink, SHARK Stimulation, SHARK Lite, SHARK Sugar Free, Still SHARK Energy Drink, SHARK Up
- Website: sharkenergy.com

Shark Energy Drink is an energy drink sold by Osotspa Co., Ltd. of Thailand, which modified the ingredients from the pre-existing M-150 that launched in 1985, five years after it was appointed by Taisho Pharmaceutical with the licensees to manufacture the world's first energy drink from Japan called Lipovitan D.

Shark Energy Drink is available in a number of variations, including carbonated, uncarbonated versions, sugared and sugar-free. The drink is manufactured in Thailand by the Osotspa Co. Ltd in Bangkok, and also in Europe by Shark AG in Innsbruck, Austria..

Shark Energy Drink is available in over 89 countries, and made its debut in UK nightclubs (like The Blue Orchid in Croydon) in 2002 & in the US later in 2008. The drink is slightly promoted in America, Europe and Asia.

The Buffalo Silverbacks of the American Basketball Association were renamed to the Buffalo Sharks in 2008 to promote the brand.

Regular Shark Energy contains natural caffeine from coffee, natural strawberry extracts and the Sugar-Free contains natural grape sugar.

As of May 2020, Osotspa Co., Ltd has ceased production of the drink in Austria and has also left several European markets.

== See also ==
- Osotspa M-150 Energy Drink
