= Rain or Shine Elasto Painters =

Philippine professional basketball team

- 2025–26 Rain or Shine Elasto Painters season
- Founded: 2006
- History: Welcoat Dragons (2006–2008); Rain or Shine Elasto Painters (2008–present)
- Team colors: Navy blue, red, yellow, white
- Company: Asian Coatings Philippines, Inc.
- Board governor: Mamerto Mondragon; Edison Oribiana (alternate)
- Team manager: Mamerto Mondragon; Jireh Ibañes (assistant)
- Head coach: Yeng Guiao
- Team captain: Adrian Nocum
- Ownership: Raymond Yu and Terry Que
- Championships: 2 championships 2012 Governors'; 2016 Commissioner's 6 Finals appearances
- Retired numbers: 1 (5)
- Website: asiancoatings.com/elastopainters/
Light uniform	Dark uniform	Alternate uniform

The Rain or Shine Elasto Painters (colloquially known as the E-Painters) are a professional basketball team in the Philippine Basketball Association owned by Asian Coatings Philippines, Inc. It debuted in the league in the 2006–07 PBA season after acquiring the franchise rights of the Shell Turbo Chargers in 2006, which disbanded after the 2004–05 PBA season.

From 1996 to 2006, the franchise played in the Philippine Basketball League, carrying the name Welcoat House Paints, Welcoat Paintmasters and the St. Benilde-Rain or Shine Elasto Painters, winning a total of six championships.

== Beginnings ==
=== Philippine Basketball League (1996–2006) ===
Welcoat Paints (PBL)
- Leagues: Philippine Basketball League
- Founded: 1996
- History: Welcoat House Paints; 1996–2001; Welcoat Paint Masters; 2001–2005; St. Benilde-Rain or Shine Elasto Painters; 2005–2006
- Location: Philippines
- Team colors: Red, white
- President: Raymund Yu and Terry Que
- Head coach: Gabby Velasco; Junel Baculi; Leo Austria; Caloy Garcia
- Championships: PBL (6): *1999 1st Challenge Cup; *1999–00 2nd Challenge Cup; *2000 Chairman's Cup; *2001 Chairman's Cup; *2002–03 Challenge Cup; *2005 Unity Cup

The Rain or Shine Elasto Painters debuted in the Philippine Basketball League in 1996 as the Welcoat Paint Masters. Its first championship came in the 1999 Challenge Cup, winning 3–0 over Red Bull Energy Drink. Welcoat was considered as one of the two teams to enter the PBA before the 2000 season but lost out to Red Bull. Since then, the Paint Masters won five more championships, fielding amateur and former Metropolitan Basketball Association players, most notably Don Allado, Renren Ritualo, Yancy de Ocampo, Rommel Adducul, Ronald Tubid, James Yap, Paul Artadi, and Jay Washington. One of its biggest rivals from 2000 to 2002 was Shark Energy Drink, with PBA players Chester Tolomia (later joined Welcoat in 2004), Roger Yap, and later Rain or Shine member Gilbert Malabanan, as both teams engaged in four straight finals series, splitting both series in the process.

In 2005, Welcoat changed its name to Rain or Shine Elasto Painters, one of the products of their parent company, Welbest. The Elasto Painters made it all the way to the finals of the Heroes Cup against Magnolia. After leading the series 2–0, Rain or Shine suffered one of the biggest collapses in league history as the Wizards won the series in five games. In the 2006 PBL Unity Cup, the Elasto Painters were swept in the semifinals by the Toyota-Otis Sparks to end their four consecutive finals appearance, but placed third in a one-game playoff against Montaña Pawnshop on June 8. Prior to the start of Game 3 of the Unity Cup title series between Harbour Centre and Toyota-Otis on June 13, 2006, the league awarded the team with the Dynasty Award for their 10 years of success in the league. Several past and present members of the Welcoat franchise were on hand, as they brought their six championship trophies during the ceremony.

=== Acquiring a PBA franchise ===
After Shell's departure in the PBA in 2005, the league gave Shell an ultimatum of until early 2006 to either announce their return to the league for the 06–07 season, or to sell the franchise to a prospective buyer. In several press releases and interview, then-PBA Commissioner Noli Eala mentioned that some companies were interested in joining the league, although he did not stress which of these companies were. One of Eala's vision was for the PBA to be a 12-team league. Welcoat suddenly came into the picture, expressing interest to buy the Shell franchise. By January 2006, major newspapers reported that the Welcoat team is nearing the completion of acquiring the Shell team. By February, the PBA announced the entry of Welcoat as the 10th PBA team for the 2006–2007 season. People's Journal said that the turnover was approved between P30-40 million, a big drop from the original P60 million the Turbo Chargers wanted The Manila Times, however, reported that it was close to P55 million that Shell wanted

Welcoat put out P60 million as bond for five years, P7 million for participation fee and another P6 million for transfer fee.

As incentive, the PBA allowed Welcoat to grab three amateur players from their Rain or Shine PBL team. The Paint Masters named Jay-R Reyes, Junjun Cabatu, and NCAA Most Valuable Player Jay Sagad as the three players from the core of its amateur team which they elevated into the pros directly. Welcoat also signed PBL veterans Niño Gelig, undrafted point guard Froilan Baguion, Jercules Tangkay, and former Shell players Adonis Sta. Maria and Rob Wainwright. In the dispersal draft, Welcoat took Gilbert Lao from Coca-Cola and Denver Lopez from San Miguel.

In August 2006, Welcoat announced that they will be named as the Welcoat Dragons in their pro stint while also grabbing former UP Fighting Maroons players Abby Santos and Jireh Ibañes as the team's new rookies, although Santos failed to sign with the team.

== Welcoat Dragons (2006–2008) ==
Welcoat Dragons kits
Light uniform	Dark uniform

In its PBA debut, Welcoat lost to eventual champion Barangay Ginebra Kings in the season-opening game of the 2006–07 PBA season, 102–69. Jojo Tangkay scored the team's first-ever basket in the league. Denver Lopez led the team with 12 points while rookie Jay-R Reyes had 10 for the Dragons. The Dragons won its first victory on October 9 defeating Coca-Cola. Their next two victories came at the hands of the San Miguel Beermen and the Talk 'N Text Phone Pals. Despite a 3–5 record, Welcoat lost their next 10 games along with injuries to key players that eventually ended their campaign with a 3–15 record, the only team to be eliminated after the elimination round of the 2006–07 PBA Philippine Cup.

During the 2007 PBA Fiesta Conference, the Dragons had two active imports, Wayland White and assistant coach Alex Compton. The other imports, Charles Clark and Rob Sanders, preceded White. The Dragons were again the first team to be eliminated in the Fiesta Conference by the hands of the Purefoods Tender Juicy Giants. The Dragons finished with a 7–29 record for the 2006–07 PBA season and was awarded the first overall draft pick after they won the draft lottery. They eventually selected Joe Devance of University of Texas at El Paso.

Before the start of the 2008 PBA Fiesta Conference, Leo Austria resigned as head coach of the Dragons citing that the management wanted a new direction. Then-assistant coach Caloy Garcia was named interim head coach on March 18 and would eventually become the team's official head coach. The Dragons finished with another 7–29 record and failed to qualify again for the playoffs in either of the two conferences.

== Rain or Shine Elasto Painters (2008–present) ==
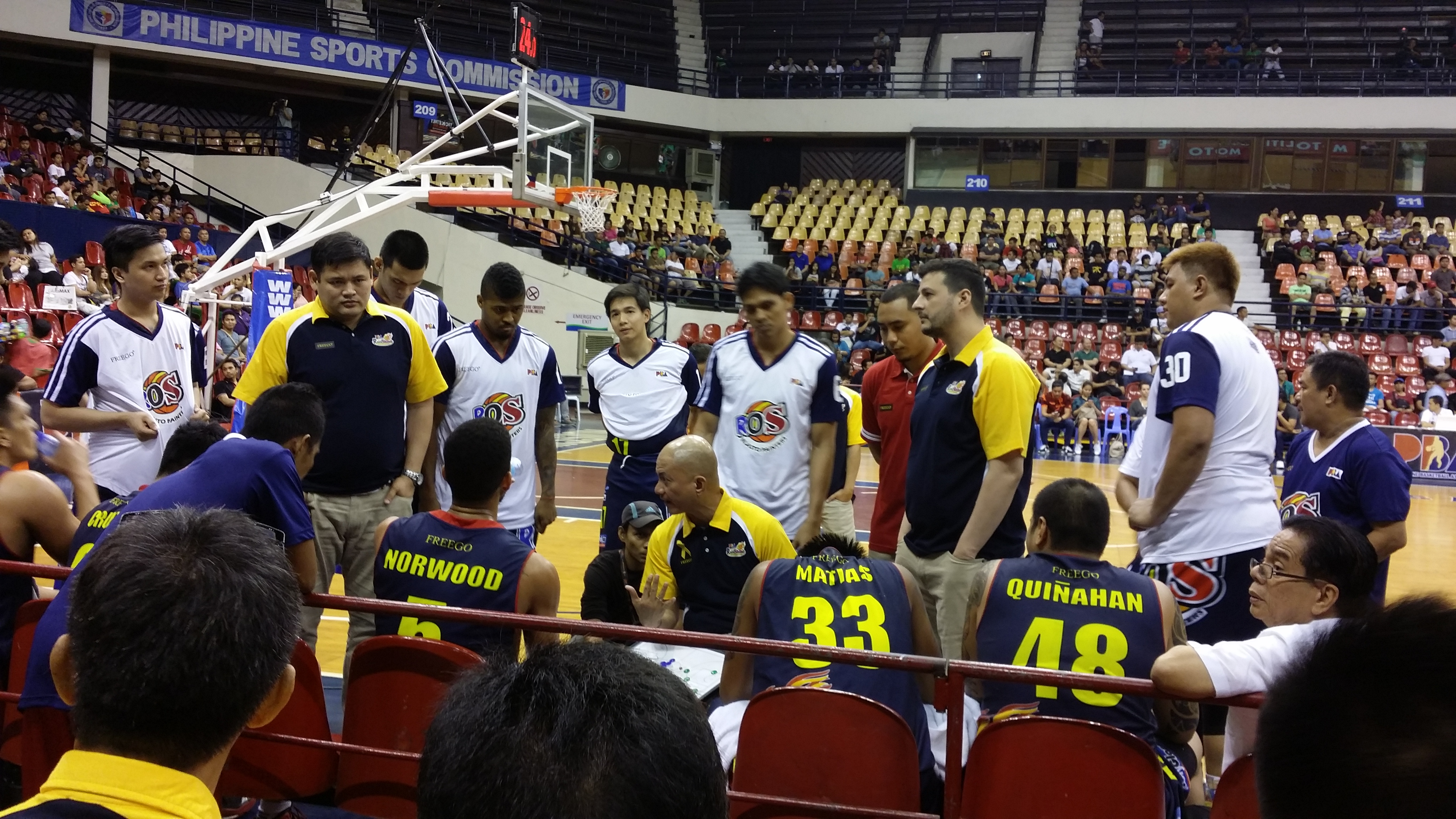
Yeng Guiao and the Elasto Painters during a timeout.

=== 2008–2009 season ===
In 2008, a new name was introduced for the team – Rain or Shine Elasto Painters. At the 2008 PBA Draft held at Market! Market!, Taguig, the team drafted Gabe Norwood of George Mason University as the first overall pick. In the 2nd round, the Elasto Painters grabbed point guard Tyrone Tang of De La Salle University. 24 hours after the draft proper, the team traded 2007 first overall pick Joe Devance and their 2009 and 2010 second-round picks to the Alaska Aces in exchange for Alaska's 2009 1st-round pick, number five overall Solomon Mercado, and veteran Eddie Laure.

They defeated Air21 on their first game of the 2008–2009 Philippine Cup, 120–102 to spark a surprise showing at the 2008-09 PBA Philippine Cup. The Elasto Painters were aiming for a semifinal berth when they were defeated by the eventual champions Talk 'N Text Tropang Texters in the elimination round. With a record of 10–8, they faced the defending champions Sta. Lucia Realtors in the quarterfinals where they were swept 2–0 in the best-of-3 series, with Norwood and Mercado being ejected in Game 1. Their 10-win record surpassed their best performance in a season.

During the Fiesta Conference, the Elasto Painters took import Charles Clark but was soon replaced by heavyweight Jai Lewis, a former college teammate of Gabe Norwood. Ace play-maker Sol Mercado got injured before their quarterfinals game with Purefoods. Despite a depleted lineup, the Elasto Painters defeated Purefoods led by Gabe Norwood and point guard Tyrone Tang in the absence of Mercado. Tang made a three-point shot to take the lead with 31 seconds left, they won and made it to the semifinals for the first time in franchise history. They were then eliminated by the Barangay Ginebra Kings in the semifinals.

=== 2011–2012 season ===
In the 2011 PBA Commissioner's Cup, they made the franchise best start, 3–0 under Yeng Guiao. In the 2011-12 PBA Philippine Cup, they finished 9–5, 5th place because of an inferior quotient on Ginebra and Petron. They swept the Barangay Ginebra Kings, 2–0 to advance to their 3rd semifinals appearance. They faced the 8th-seeded Powerade Tigers who eliminated the top-seeded crowd favorite B-Meg Llamados but they are eliminated, 3–4.

=== 2012–2013 season ===
The team made history during the 2012 PBA Commissioner's Cup by signing the Croatian center Bruno Šundov. He served as a center in Croatian basketball team and was the first European player to play in the league.

In the 2012 PBA Governors Cup, they found their franchise best start, 4–0. They won 107–100, 100–94*, 106–92 and 93–90 over Alaska Aces, B-Meg Llamados, Air21 Express and Barangay Ginebra Kings on Paul Lee's winning triple 2.6 seconds remaining but lost on archrival Powerade, 98–104. * Rain or Shine won via overtime.

They made their first final appearance after winning against B-Meg Llamados at a very crucial game, 92–82, under the leadership of coach Yeng Guiao on 2012 PBA Governor's Cup, though after that loss, B-Meg would win in a do-or-die game against the Barangay Ginebra Kings for the remaining slot for the finals.

On their debut game for the 2012 Governor's Cup, the Elasto Painters won a very physical game against B-Meg Llamados 91–80. The team had a loss on Game Two where their rookie, Paul Lee, re-injured his left shoulder 80–85. Even without Paul Lee, the team bounced back on their third and fourth games, 93–84 and 94–89, respectively, to lead the series 3–1. However, the team lost both Game 5 and 6 with B-Meg forcing a winner-take-all Game 7. On August 5, 2012, the six-year-old franchise won their first Championship title after handing B-Meg an 83–76 game loss. The undermanned team led by coach Yeng Guiao along with their import Jamelle Cornley and the local Jeff Chan, who won the Finals MVP, grabbed the lead early in the third quarter after B-Meg Llamados' import Marqus Blakely had foul trouble.

=== 2013–2014 season ===
In 2013-14 PBA Philippine Cup they finished the eliminations in 2nd place of the standings. They beat GlobalPort Batang Pier in the quarterfinals in one game. They also beat Petron Blaze Boosters in 4–1 series win in the semifinals, despite coach Yeng Guiao having suspended in Game 5. They faced San Mig Super Coffee Mixers in the finals but lost to them in 6 games.

=== 2014–2015 season ===
In 2014-15 PBA Philippine Cup they finished the eliminations in 2nd seed of the standings and they got the automatic semifinals slot as the new format in the Philippine Cup playoffs was changed. They face Alaska in the Semifinals but lost in 6 games. In 2015 PBA Commissioner's Cup, they chose Rick Jackson as their temporary import to wait for Wayne Chism to release from Hapoel Gilboa Galil of Israel. On February 16, Wayne is now ready to play for Rain or Shine and set his debut on February 20. They finished 1st in the eliminations via quotient system. It is the first time that they finished the top spot since 2012 PBA Governors Cup. They beat Brgy. Ginebra in a crucial game; 92–91. They swept Meralco in the best-of-three semifinals to face Talk 'N Text Tropang Texters in the Finals. They then lost the game 7 in overtime. But in the middle of the Commissioner's Cup, they released their resident import for the Governors Cup Arizona Reid to play for San Miguel Beermen to replace Ronald Roberts. Many fans of Rain or Shine were shocked after they heard the news, because of this, in 2015 PBA Governors' Cup, they chose former Alaska import Wendell McKines as their import. They finished 3rd place of the standings, in the Quarterfinals, they beat Barako Bull Energy in overtime by Paul Lee's layup, but lost to San Miguel in 4 games at the best of five Semifinals.

=== 2015–2016 season ===
In the 2015 PBA draft many analysts in their mock draft choose either chose Arthur dela Cruz or Norbert Torres for the third pick, but the team selected Maverick Ahanmisi, then Josan Nimes on the 12th pick and Don Trollano on the 2nd-round pick. In 2015-16 PBA Philippine Cup, they finished 3rd in the standings and advanced to the playoffs, beating Blackwater in the first phase of the quarterfinals and TNT in the second phase of the quarterfinals. But they lost to San Miguel in the semifinals in six games. In the 2016 PBA Commissioner's Cup, they signed Wayne Chism to be their import for the third time, although Wayne injured his hamstring during the game against Meralco on February 17, it was doubtful he could play for the rest of the conference. They chose Antoine Wright to replace Chism but he was replaced by Mo Charlo on March 8. While approaching the playoffs, they chose Pierre Henderson-Niles to replace the undersized Charlo to match-up against their possible opponents in the playoffs including Greg Slaughter and June Mar Fajardo. With Henderson-Niles, a 6'8" center to help the team as an inside presence in the paint, they finished 5th place in the standings and swept Ginebra in the quarterfinals and finally beat San Miguel in 4 games at the best-of-five semifinals. They faced the Alaska in the finals and finally they won their 2nd championship in their franchise history in 6 games which Paul Lee was named Finals MVP. In the 2016 PBA Governors' Cup, they selected Dior Lowhorn as their import, then after losing back to back games in the middle of the conference, they signed Jason Forte to replace Lowhorn in September. After two games, he was replaced by Josh Dollard. Rain or Shine then failed to gain the last spot to qualify to the playoffs after losing to Phoenix, 94–105. This would also be Guiao's last tenure as Rain or Shine's head coach.

=== 2016–2017 season ===
On October 5, Yeng Guiao signed with the NLEX Road Warriors. This prompted assistant coach Caloy Garcia to return as the head coach of the team starting next season. On October 13, their starting point guard, Lee was traded to Star in exchange for James Yap. On the same day, J.R. Quiñahan was also traded to GlobalPort in exchange for Jay Washington. On October 14, Josan Nimes was traded to Mahindra for a second-round draft pick in 2018. The team hired two former PBA players, Jolly Escobar and Matthew Makalintal to be the new assistant coaches of Rain or Shine.

=== 2021 season ===
Former Mahindra head coach Chris Gavina was appointed, replacing Caloy Garcia. Garcia was reassigned as an assistant coach, and active consultant.

=== 2022–23 season ===
==== Return of Yeng Guiao ====
In September 2022, Yeng Guiao returns as head coach of the Elasto Painters, replacing Chris Gavina.

=== 2023–24 season ===
In the Philippine Cup, Elasto Painters reached the semifinals, but wereswept by eventual runner-up San Miguel Beermen.

== Current roster ==
Rain or Shine Elasto Painters roster
Players
Coaches

Pos.	#	POB	Name	Height	Weight	DOB (YYYY–MM–DD)	From
F	0	(United States)	Caelan Tiongson	6 ft 5 in (1.96 m)	205 lb (93 kg)	1992–05–07	Biola
G	1	(Philippines)	Adrian Nocum	6 ft 0 in (1.83 m)	167 lb (76 kg)	1999−08−10	Mapúa
G	2	(Sweden)	Felix Pangilinan-Lemetti	6 ft 1 in (1.85 m)	190 lb (86 kg)	1999–02–10	Salt Lake CC
F	4	(Philippines)	Mike Malonzo	6 ft 2 in (1.88 m)		1999−10−23	National-U
G	8	(Philippines)	Anton Asistio	5 ft 10 in (1.78 m)	175 lb (79 kg)	1995–06–02	Ateneo
G	9	(Philippines)	Joshua David	6 ft 0 in (1.83 m)	180 lb (82 kg)	2000–01–06	De La Salle
G	11	(United States)	Stanley Pringle	6 ft 1 in (1.85 m)	185 lb (84 kg)	1987–03–05	Penn State
F	12	(Philippines)	Jun Roque (injured)	6 ft 4 in (1.93 m)		2001−10−17	Letran
G	14	(Philippines)	Andrei Caracut	5 ft 10 in (1.78 m)	180 lb (82 kg)	1996–01–30	De La Salle
C	21	(United States)	Keith Datu (injured)	6 ft 8 in (2.03 m)	220 lb (100 kg)	1996–03–19	Chico State
F	22	(Philippines)	Jhonard Clarito	6 ft 2 in (1.88 m)	187 lb (85 kg)	1996–04–03	De Ocampo
C	24	(United States)	Luis Villegas	6 ft 7 in (2.01 m)	215 lb (98 kg)	1997−09−05	UE
F/C	25	(Philippines)	Leonard Santillan	6 ft 4 in (1.93 m)	210 lb (95 kg)	1996–03–05	De La Salle
C	28	(Philippines)	Beau Belga	6 ft 5 in (1.96 m)	245 lb (111 kg)	1986–11–30	Philippine Christian
G	29	(Philippines)	Deo Cuajao	6 ft 1 in (1.85 m)		2001−01−30	Letran
F/C	44	(Philippines)	Christian Manaytay	6 ft 5 in (1.96 m)		1999−11−02	UST

Head coach

- (Philippines) Yeng Guiao

Assistant coach(es)

- (Philippines) Caloy Garcia (1st assistant)
- (Philippines) Mike Buendia
- (Philippines) Ricky Umayam

Team manager

- (Philippines) Mamerto Mondragon^{[a]}
- (Philippines) Jireh Ibañes (assistant)

Legend

- (C) Team captain
- (CI) Commissioner's Cup Import
- (GI) Governors' Cup Import
- (EI) EASL Import
- (DP) Unsigned draft pick
- (FA) Free agent
- (IN) Inactive
- (S) Suspended
- (R) Rookie
- Injured

Roster

- ^{a} also serves as Rain or Shine's board governor.

== Awards ==
=== Individual awards ===
Finals MVP	PBA Rookie of the Year Award
Jeff Chan (2012 Governors'); Paul Lee (2016 Commissioner's)	Gabe Norwood (2008–09); Paul Lee (2011–12)
PBA All-Defensive Team	PBA Mythical First Team
Jireh Ibañes (2011–12, 2013–14); Gabe Norwood (2009–10, 2012–13, 2013–14, 2014–15, 2015–16, 2016–17, 2017–18)	Paul Lee (2014–15)
PBA Mythical Second Team	PBA Most Improved Player
Gabe Norwood (2008–09); Jay-R Reyes (2008–09); Jeff Chan (2011–12); Paul Lee (2011–12, 2013–14)	Jeff Chan (2011–12); Jericho Cruz (2015–16); Jhonard Clarito (2023–24)
PBA Sportsmanship Award	PBA Best Import
Gabe Norwood (2016–17, 2017–18, 2019); Gian Mamuyac (2024–25)	Arizona Reid (2011 Governors', 2014 Governors'); Jamelle Cornley (2012 Governors'); Wayne Chism (2015 Commissioner's)

=== PBA Press Corps Awards ===
Executive of the Year	Baby Dalupan Coach of the Year	Defensive Player of the Year
Terry Que (2011-12, 2015-16); Raymond Yu (2011-12, 2015-16)	Yeng Guiao (2011-12)	Gabe Norwood (2009-10); Jireh Ibañes (2011-12)
Bogs Adornado Comeback Player of the Year	Mr. Quality Minutes	All-Rookie Team
Paul Lee (2015-16)	Jervy Cruz (2012-13); Jericho Cruz (2015-16)	Jireh Ibañes (2006-07); Jay-R Reyes (2006-07); Joe Devance (2007-08); Sol Mercado (2008-09); Gabe Norwood (2008-09); Jervy Cruz (2009-10); Paul Lee (2011-12); Chris Tiu (2012-13); Raymond Almazan (2013-14); Jericho Cruz (2014-15); Maverick Ahanmisi (2015-16); Javee Mocon (2019); Leonard Santillan (2021); Adrian Nocum (2023-24); Caelan Tiongson (2024-25)

=== All-Star Weekend ===
All-Star MVP	Obstacle Challenge
Gabe Norwood (2010); Jeff Chan (2013)	Maverick Ahanmisi (2016, 2017); Beau Belga (2018, 2019)
Three-Point Shootout	All-Star Selection
Chris Tiu (2013); James Yap (2018)	2009: Jai Lewis (import); Gabe Norwood; Jay-R Reyes; 2010: Sol Mercado; Gabe Norwood; 2011: Gabe Norwood; 2012: Paul Lee; 2013: Beau Belga; Jeffrei Chan; Gabe Norwood; 2014: Beau Belga; Jeffrei Chan; Paul Lee; Gabe Norwood; 2015: Beau Belga; Jeffrei Chan; Paul Lee; Gabe Norwood; 2016: Jeffrei Chan; Jericho Cruz; Paul Lee; Gabe Norwood; J.R. Quiñahan; 2017: Raymond Almazan; Jeffrei Chan; Jericho Cruz; Mike Tolomia; Jay Washington; James Yap; 2018: Raymond Almazan; Gabe Norwood; James Yap; 2019: Gabe Norwood; James Yap; 2023: Gian Mamuyac; Gabe Norwood (did not play); James Yap; 2024: Gabe Norwood; 2026: Gian Mamuyac; Adrian Nocum; Leonard Santillan; Caelan Tiongson

== Head coaches ==
Rain or Shine Elasto Painters head coaches
Name	Start	End	Seasons	Overall record				Best finish
Name	Start	End	Seasons	W	L	PCT	G	Best finish
Leo Austria	2006	2008	2	10	44	.185	54	Eliminations
Caloy Garcia	2008	2010	4	53	75	.414	128	Semifinals
Caloy Garcia	2016	2020	4	69	71	.493	140	Semifinals
Yeng Guiao	2011	2016	6	173	125	.581	298	Champions
Yeng Guiao	2022	Present	2	29	36	.446	65	Semifinals
Chris Gavina	2021	2022	2	13	22	.371	35	Quarterfinals

== Season-by-season records ==
List of the last five conferences completed by the Rain or Shine franchise. For the full-season history, see List of Rain or Shine Elasto Painters seasons.

Note: GP = Games played, W = Wins, L = Losses, W–L% = Winning percentage

Season	Conference	GP	W	L	W–L%	Finish	Playoffs
2024–25	Commissioner's	12	7	5	.583	6th	Lost in semifinals vs. TNT, 1–4
2024–25	Philippine	11	6	5	.545	7th	Lost in semifinals vs. TNT, 2–4
2025–26	Philippine	11	8	3	.727	2nd	Lost in quarterfinals vs. Meralco in two games
2025–26	Commissioner's	12	9	3	.750	3rd	Lost in semifinals vs. Barangay Ginebra, 2–4
2025–26	Governors' Cup	10	6	4	.600	2nd (Group B)	Lost in quarterfinals vs. Converge, 1–3
An asterisk (*) indicates one-game playoff; two asterisks (**) indicates team with twice-to-beat advantage

== Players of note ==
=== Members of the PBA's 25 greatest players ===
- Samboy Lim, former player, assistant coach and consultant in their Philippine Basketball League squad.

=== Other notable players ===
- Ryan Araña
- Junjun Cabatu
- Jeff Chan
- Jervy Cruz
- Paul Lee
- Jonathan Uyloan
- J.R. Quiñahan
- Arizona Reid
- Jay-R Reyes
- Ty Tang
- J. R. Quiñahan
- Chris Tiu

=== Retired numbers ===
Rain or Shine Elasto Painters retired numbers
N°	Player	Position	Tenure	Date
5	Gabe Norwood	F	2008–2025	April 10, 2026^{[b]}

- ^{b} – retired on April 10, 2026 during the elimination round of the 2026 PBA Commissioner's Cup

== Championships ==
=== PBL championships ===
- 1999 1st PBL Challenge Cup (def. Red Bull 3–0)
- 1999 2nd PBL Challenge Cup (def. ANA Water Dispenser 3–0)
- 2000 PBL Chairman's Cup (def. Shark Energy Drink 4–0)
- 2001 PBL Cup (def. Shark Energy Drink 4–0)
- 2002 PBL Challenge Cup (def. Dazz 3–0)
- 2005 PBL Unity Cup (def. Montaña 3–1)

=== PBA championships ===
- 2012 PBA Governors Cup (def. B-Meg Llamados 4–3)
- 2016 PBA Commissioner's Cup (def. Alaska Aces 4–2)

== See also ==
- Rain or Shine Elasto Painters draft history

Preceded by Shell Turbo Chargers	PBA franchise lineage 2006–present	Succeeded by current incarnation
