= Denver Lopez =

Filipino basketball player

Personal information
- Born: September 2, 1980 (age 46) Caloocan, Metro Manila
- Listed height: 6 ft 1 in (1.85 m)
- Listed weight: 180 lb (82 kg)

Career information
- College: Cal State Fullerton (2002–2004)
- PBA draft: 2004: 1st round, 6th overall pick
- Drafted by: Red Bull Barako
- Playing career: 2004–2009
- Position: Point guard / shooting guard

Career history
- 2004–2005: Red Bull Barako
- 2005–2006: San Miguel Beermen
- 2006–2009: Welcoat Dragons / Rain or Shine Elasto Painters

Denver Lopez (born September 2, 1980) is a Filipino retired professional basketball player who last played for the Rain or Shine Elasto Painters in the Philippine Basketball Association (PBA). He was drafted sixth overall by Red Bull in 2004.

== Player profile ==
Lopez played for Red Bull as a rookie and he averaged 9.7 points per game and 2.2 assists per game. He also played for the San Miguel Beermen in the 2005–06 PBA season. After three seasons with Rain or Shine, he retired in 2009 because of career-long injuries.

== PBA career statistics ==
Legend
GP	Games played	MPG	Minutes per game
FG%	Field-goal percentage	3P%	3-point field-goal percentage	FT%	Free-throw percentage
RPG	Rebounds per game	APG	Assists per game	SPG	Steals per game
BPG	Blocks per game	PPG	Points per game	**Bold**	Career high

=== Season-by-season averages ===
Year	Team	GP	MPG	FG%	3P%	FT%	RPG	APG	SPG	BPG	PPG
2004–05	Red Bull / San Miguel	**61**	15.7	.339	.336	.478	1.6	1.4	.3	.1	3.7
2005–06	San Miguel	28	10.1	.353	.346	.667	.5	.5	.3	.1	1.9
2006–07	Welcoat	33	**28.6**	**.377**	**.369**	**.753**	**2.2**	2.2	.5	.1	**9.7**
2007–08	Welcoat	15	27.8	.323	.217	.667	2.1	**2.9**	**.6**	**.3**	7.7
2008–09	Rain or Shine	3	6.7	.300	.286	.000	.3	.0	.0	.0	2.7
Career		140	18.7	.352	.328	.652	1.6	1.6	.4	.1	5.2
