= Makati Coliseum =

Public indoor arena in Makati, Philippines

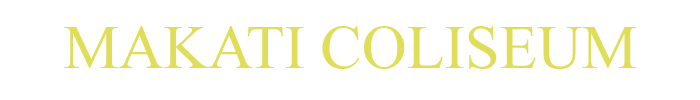
- Interactive map of Makati Coliseum
- Location: Makati, Philippines
- Coordinates: 14°34′13″N 121°00′36″E
- Owner: Makati city government
- Operator: Makati city government
- Capacity: 3,500

Construction
- Groundbreaking: March 1996
- Opened: 1997

Tenants
- PBL (1997–2005); UAAP (2002–2003); PBA (1999, 2002–2005); NCAA (2002–2004); UNTV Cup (2014–2015); Makati Super Crunch (MPBL) (2019)

The Makati Coliseum is an indoor sporting arena located in Barangay Singkamas, Makati, Philippines. Built and operated by the Makati city government, it was the home venue of the Makati Super Crunch of the Maharlika Pilipinas Basketball League in 2019.

The coliseum has also played host to the basketball games of the Philippine Basketball Association, the Philippine Basketball League, the National Collegiate Athletic Association, the UNTV Cup, the University Athletic Association of the Philippines, and the National Athletic Association of Schools, Colleges and Universities. It has also been the venue of major boxing events, as well as conventions, concerts and sports festivals. During the COVID-19 pandemic, it has also been used as a vaccination site by the city government.
