= Junjun Cabatu =

Filipino basketball player

Personal information
- Born: May 25, 1984 (age 42) Alcala, Cagayan, Philippines
- Listed height: 6 ft 5 in (1.96 m)
- Listed weight: 215 lb (98 kg)

Career information
- High school: St. Vincent School (Quezon City)
- College: De La Salle
- PBA draft: 2006: Elevated
- Drafted by: Welcoat Dragons
- Playing career: 2006–2011
- Position: Small forward / power forward
- Number: 25, and 3

Career history
- 2006–2007: Welcoat Dragons
- 2007–2008: Alaska Aces
- 2008–2009: Barangay Ginebra Kings
- 2010–2011: Philippine Patriots

Santiago "Junjun" S. Cabatu Jr. (born June 25, 1984) is a Filipino former professional basketball player. He played for the San Miguel Beermen in the Asean Basketball League until 2011. He is the son of Santiago "Sonny" Cabatu Sr., who is a former PBA player and was the very first draft pick of the league in 1985. He played high school basketball at St. Vincent School of Quezon City along with his elder brother Christian Cabatu and some notable players like Percival Cendana and Christian Anlacan to name a few. They won the National Championship and represented Manila selection in the Palarong Pambansa 2000 where they finished 2nd place behind Cebu selection.
