= Mayor of San Juan, Metro Manila =

Local chief executive of San Juan City, Philippines

Mayor of San Juan
- Punong Lungsod ng San Juan
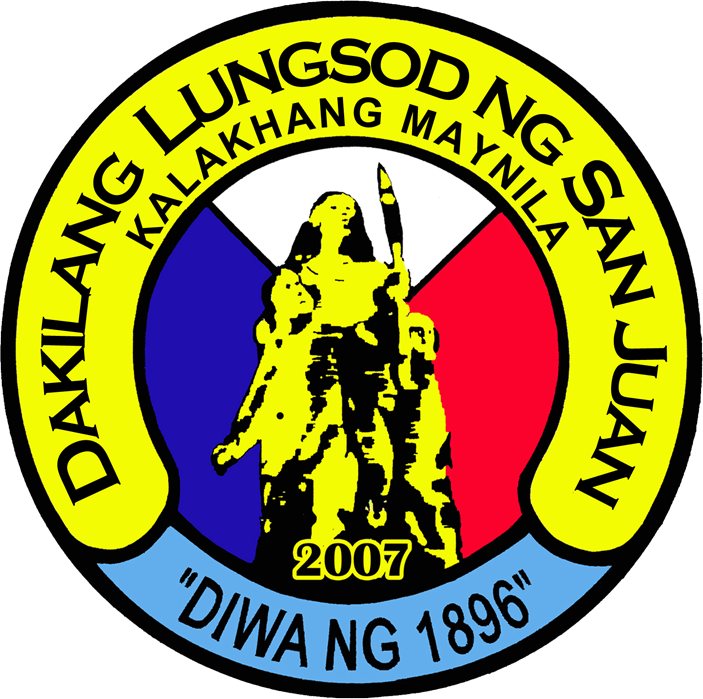
- Seal of the City of San Juan

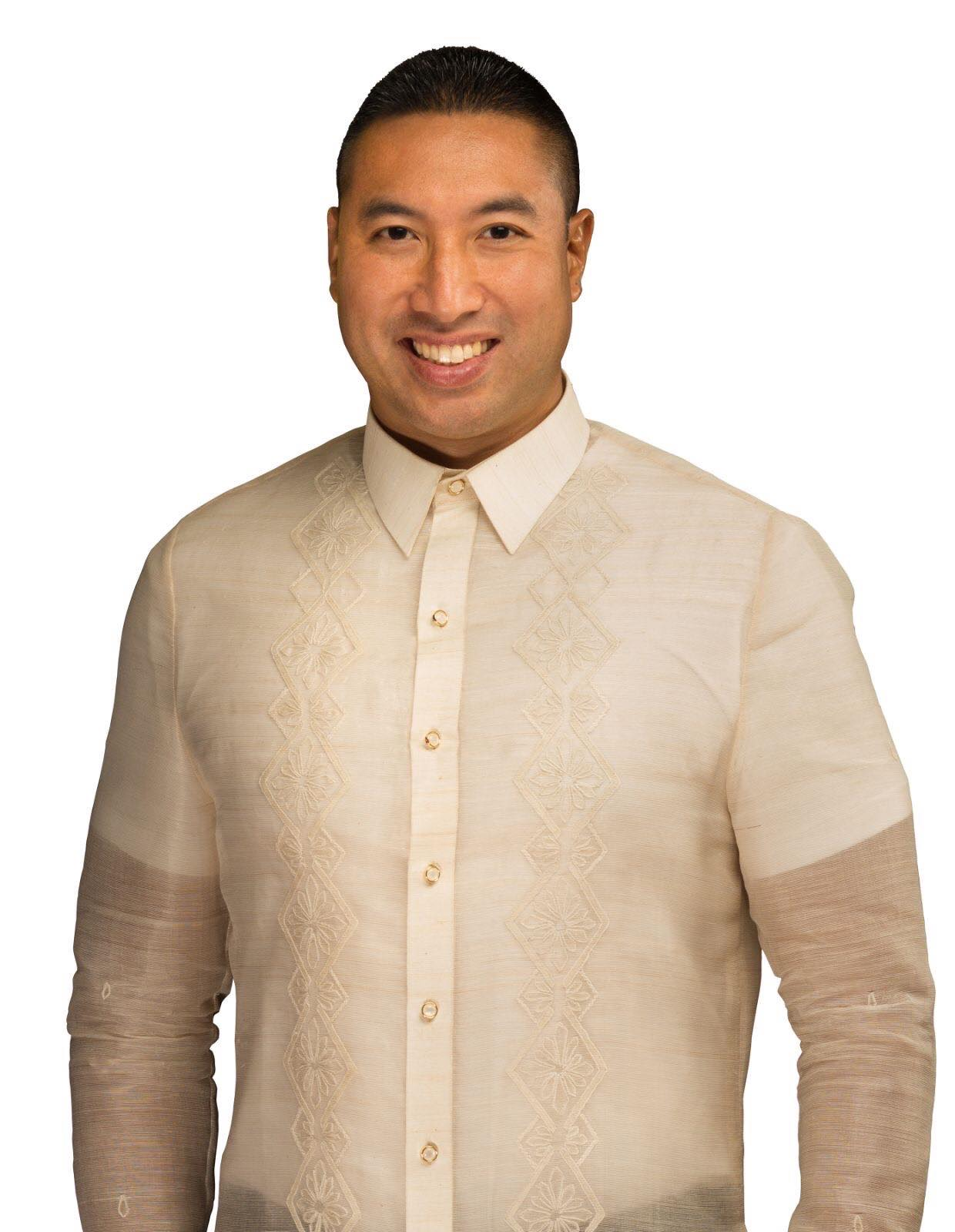
- Incumbent; Francisco Javier Zamora since June 30, 2019
- Style: Mayor, The Honorable
- Appointer: Elected via popular vote
- Term length: 3 years
- Inaugural holder: Andres Soriano
- Formation: 1901

The Mayor of San Juan (Filipino: Punong Lungsod ng San Juan) is the head of the local government of the city of San Juan that is elected to three-year terms. The mayor is also the executive head and leads the city's departments in executing the city ordinances and improving public services. The city mayor is restricted to three consecutive terms, totaling nine years, although a mayor can be elected again after an interruption of one term.

The current mayor of San Juan is Francisco Javier Zamora.

== History ==
During the Spanish colonial rule, San Juan del Monte was headed by a Gobernadorcillo.

The position of municipal president was established in 1901, the same year when San Juan del Monte became part of the newly created province of Rizal. From 1903 to 1907, it was placed under the administration of San Felipe Neri (present-day Mandaluyong).

During World War II, President Manuel L. Quezon established the City of Greater Manila in 1942, which absorbed San Juan and its municipal mayor became a district chief reporting to the city's Chief of the Division of Districts and of the District and Neighborhood Association. Aquilino de Guzman (1942–1943) and Regino Eustanqio (1943–1944) served in this capacity. The City of Greater Manila was abolished on August 1, 1945, restoring San Juan's municipal status and the position redesignated as mayor.

In 1969, actor Joseph Estrada became mayor of San Juan after winning an electoral protest against Braulio Sto. Domingo from his 1967 election loss, initiating a family dynasty that would heavily shape the city's politics for decades. Following the 1986 People Power Revolution, his initial tenure ended and San Juan was led by two acting mayors from 1986 to 1988, followed by the elected term of Adolfo Sto. Domingo from 1988 to 1992. The Ejercito–Estrada dynasty reestablished control in 1992 and held the mayoralty for the next 27 years through Estrada's sons, Jinggoy Estrada (1992–2001) and JV Ejercito (2001–2010), who became the first city mayor when San Juan achieved cityhood in 2007, and his former partner, Guia Gomez (2010–2019), who is Ejercito's mother. This family hold was briefly interrupted in 2001 when Vice Mayor Philip Cezar served as acting mayor for two months following Jinggoy's arrest on plunder charges. This dynasty's hold on the position was broken in 2019 when then-Vice Mayor Janella Estrada was defeated by former Vice Mayor Francis Zamora.

== List ==
- Names in italic are acting in capacity.

No.	Gobernadorcillo	Lieutenant, by order	Term of office
Gobernadorcillo of San Juan del Monte, Province of Manila
1	Olegario Parada	1. Jose Ceferino; 2. Inocencio Francisco; 3. Mateo Ibañez	1847–1849
2	Francisco Ramós	1. Vicente Ramós	1849
3	Domingo Pascual	1. Estanis Parada	1877-1879
4	José Angeles Reyes		1895
5	José Angeles Reyes		1896
6	Romualdo Pascual		1897

No.	Image	Mayor	Party	Deputy (later Vice Mayor)	Term
Municipal President of San Juan del Monte, Province of Rizal
1		Andres Soriano			1901–1903
Municipal President of San Felipe Neri, Province of Rizal
*		Pantaleon Blas			1903–1904
*		Apolinar Coronado			1904–1905
*		Claro Castañeda			1905-1907
Municipal President of San Juan del Monte, Province of Rizal
2		Marcelo Luna			1907-1910
3		Juan Domingo de Mesa			1910-1912
4		Juan Gutierrez			1912-1916
5		Juan Domingo de Mesa		Amando Asiñas	1916-1920
6		Valentín Ibáñez		Luis Artiaga	1928-1931
Elected Municipal President of San Juan del Monte, Province of Rizal
6		Graciano Santos			1931-1933
7		Maximo Reyes			1933-1934
8		Engracio Santos		Florencio Atanacio	1935-1938
9		Daniel Santiago			1938-1941
*		Jorge B. Vargas (Note: As Mayor of the City of Greater Manila)	KALIBAPI	Daniel Santiago	1941-1942
*		León Guinto	KALIBAPI	Aquilino de Guzman (1942–1943); Regino Eustanqio (1943–1944)	1942-1944
*		Regino Eustanqio	KALIBAPI		1944-1945
*		Daniel Santiago	KALIBAPI		1945-1946
Elected Municipal Mayor of San Juan del Monte, Province of Rizal
10		Engracio Santos			1946-1954
*		Mariano Domingo			1954
11		Nicanor Salaysay			1954-1955
12		Nicanor C. Ibuna		S. Veloso (1955–1959); Filemon C. Suarez (1959–1963); Ricardo Cruz (1963–1967)	1955-1967
13		Braulio Sto. Domingo		Pablo T. Angeles	1967-1969
14		Joseph Estrada	Nacionalista	Pablo T. Angeles	1969-1975
Elected Municipal Mayor of San Juan, Metropolitan Manila
14		Joseph Estrada	Nacionalista		1975-1986
*		Reynaldo San Pascual		Jesus Liborio	1986-1987
*		Antonio Quirino	UNIDO	Ernesto Guingona	1987-1988
15		Adolfo Sto. Domingo	Liberal	Jinggoy Estrada	1988-1992
16		Jinggoy Estrada	NPC	Philip Cezar	1992-2001
*		Philip Cezar	NPC	Vincent Pacheco	2001
Elected City Mayor of San Juan, Metropolitan Manila
17		JV Ejercito	PMP	Leonardo "Boy" Celles	2001-2010
18		Guia Gomez	PMP	Francisco Javier Zamora (2010-2016); Janella Estrada (2016-2019)	2010-2019
19		Francisco Javier Zamora	PDP–Laban	Jose Warren Villa (2019-2023); Angelo Agcaoili (2023-)	2019-
19		Francisco Javier Zamora	PFP	Jose Warren Villa (2019-2023); Angelo Agcaoili (2023-)	2019-

== Elections ==
- 2004 San Juan, Metro Manila, local elections
- 2007 San Juan, Metro Manila, local elections
- 2010 San Juan, Metro Manila, local elections
- 2013 San Juan, Metro Manila, local elections
- 2016 San Juan, Metro Manila, local elections
- 2019 San Juan, Metro Manila, local elections
- 2022 San Juan, Metro Manila, local elections
- 2025 San Juan, Metro Manila, local elections
