= 2019 San Juan, Metro Manila, local elections =

Part of the 2019 Philippine general election

2019 San Juan mayoral election
- May 13, 2019
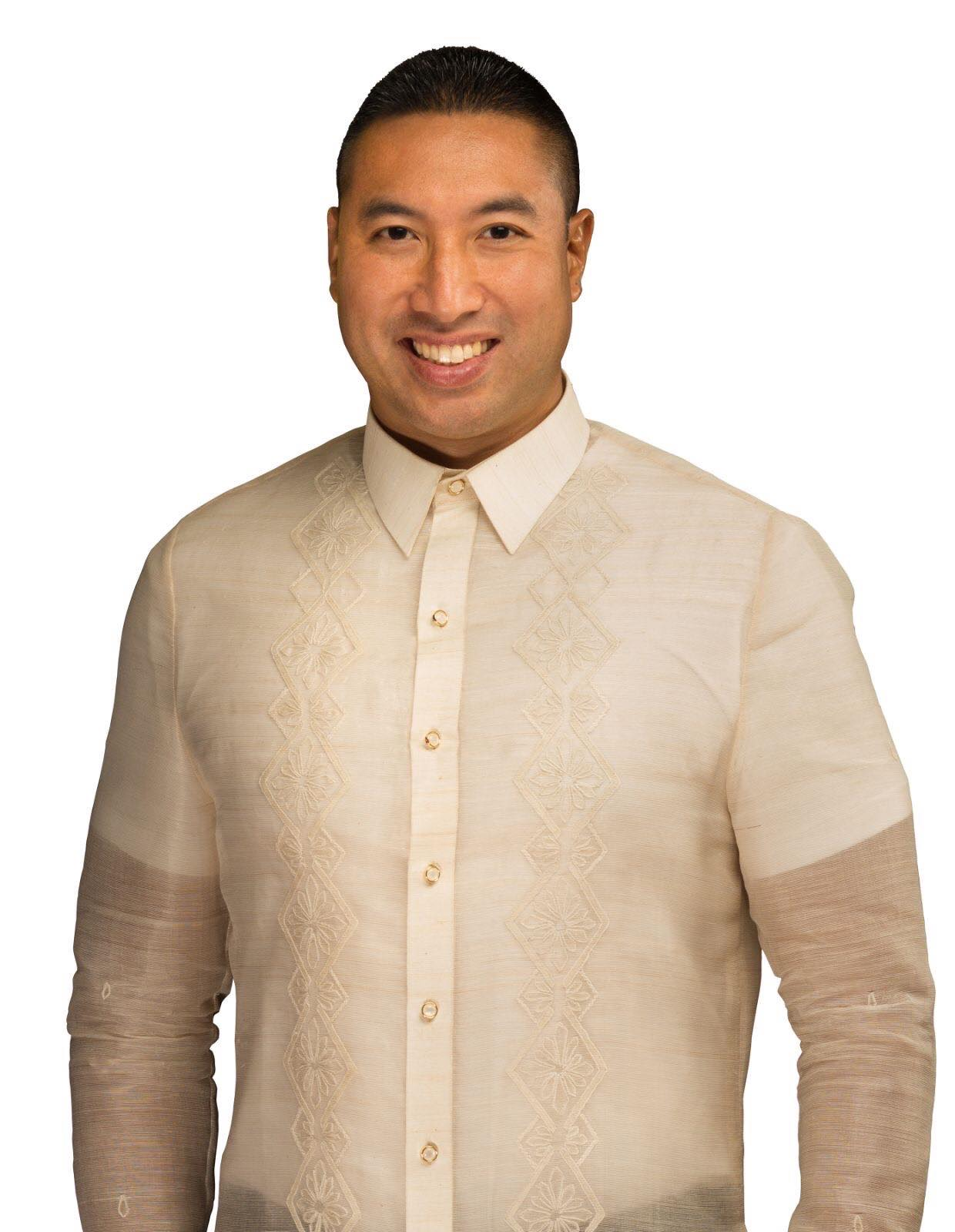

Nominee	Francis Zamora	Janella Ejercito
Party	PDP–Laban	PMP
Running mate	Warren Villa	Leonardo Celles
Popular vote	35,060	24,813
Percentage	58.55	41.45
Mayor before election
Guia Gomez
PMP
Elected mayor
Francis Zamora
PDP–Laban

Local elections was held in San Juan, Metro Manila on May 13, 2019 within the Philippine general election. The voters elected for the elective local posts in the city: the mayor, vice mayor, the congressman, and the councilors, six of them in the two districts of the city.

Former Vice Mayor Francis Zamora led the mayoral race with 35,060 votes defeating incumbent Vice Mayor Janella Ejercito, granddaughter of former President and incumbent Mayor of Manila Joseph Estrada, who garnered 24,813 votes. Zamora's victory marked the conclusion of the reign of the Ejercito Estradas in the city who ruled the city for 50 years.

== Background ==
Incumbent Guia Gomez is now on her third and final term as mayor of San Juan. She was elected as mayor in 2010 replacing her son, JV Ejercito, who served as mayor from 2001 to 2010 before being elected as representative of the Lone District of San Juan and later Senator of the Philippines. Incumbent vice mayor Janella Ejercito is her party's nominee for the mayorship. She is the granddaughter of former president and incumbent Manila mayor Joseph Estrada and the eldest daughter of former senator Jinggoy Estrada; both are former mayors of San Juan and former senators as well. Her running mate is incumbent councilor Leonardo Celles, who served as vice mayor of San Juan from 2001 to 2010. Her main opponent is Francis Zamora, former vice mayor of San Juan and Gomez's opponent in 2016. The Ejercitos and Zamoras used to be allies before becoming rivals.

== Results ==
=== For Representative ===
Incumbent Ronaldo Zamora is running for re-election again. Challenging him is actor and former Makati Vice Mayor Edu Manzano.

Congressional Elections in San Juan's Lone District
Party	Candidate	Votes	%
PDP–Laban	Ronaldo Zamora	35,386	59.96
PMP	Edu Manzano	23,627	40.04
Total votes		59,013	100.00
PDP–Laban hold			

=== For Mayor ===
San Juan Mayoralty Elections
Party	Candidate	Votes	%
PDP–Laban	Francis Zamora	35,060	58.55
PMP	Janella Ejercito	24,813	41.45
Total votes		59,873	100.00
PDP–Laban gain from PMP			

=== For Vice Mayor ===
San Juan Vice Mayoralty Elections
Party	Candidate	Votes	%
PDP–Laban	Warren Villa	28,882	51.16
PMP	Leonardo Celles	24,465	43.34
Independent	Glenn Angeles	3,104	5.50
Total votes		56,451	100.00
PDP–Laban gain from PMP			

=== For Councilors (Candidates) ===
==== One San Juan ====
Pwersa ng Masang Pilipino/One San Juan 1st District
Name	Party	Result
Boyet Aquino	PMP	Won
Mari Goitia	PMP	Lost
Raissa Laurel-Subijano	PMP	Won
Vincent Pacheco	PMP	Won
Vic Reyes	PMP	Won
Chesco Velasco	PMP	Won

Pwersa ng Masang Pilipino/One San Juan 2nd District
Name	Party	Result
Jana Ejercito	PMP	Won
Joy Ibuna	PMP	Won
Cris Mathay	PMP	Won
Kit Peralta	PMP	Won
Allen Silvano	PMP	Lost
Lino Trinidad	PMP	Lost

==== Team San Juan ====
Partido Demokratiko Pilipino-Lakas ng Bayan/Team San Juan 1st District
Name	Party	Result
Paul Artadi	PDP–Laban	Won
Jhun Caridad	PDP–Laban	Lost
Lino Mendoza	PDP–Laban	Lost
Ayie Tejoso	PDP–Laban	Lost
Boyet Tolentino	PDP–Laban	Lost
Pongie Veneal	PDP–Laban	Lost

Partido Demokratiko Pilipino-Lakas ng Bayan/Team San Juan 2nd District
Name	Party	Result
Don Allado	PDP–Laban	Lost
Totoy Bernardo	PDP–Laban	Won
Bea De Guzman	PDP–Laban	Won
Owie Laruscain	PDP–Laban	Lost
Peter Punzalan	PDP–Laban	Lost
Rocky Tañada Yam	PDP–Laban	Lost

==== Katipunan ng Demokratikong Pilipino ====
Katipunan ng Demokratikong Pilipino 1st District
Name	Party	Result
Carlos Valdes III	KDP	Lost

=== For Councilors (Results) ===
==== First District ====
City Council Elections in San Juan's First District
Party	Candidate	Votes	%
PMP	Vincent Pacheco	17,061	11.18
PDP–Laban	Paul Artadi	15,437	10.31
PMP	Raissa Laurel-Subijano	15,057	9.87
PMP	Vic Reyes	14,045	9.21
PMP	Chesco Velasco	12,909	8.46
PMP	Arthur "Boyet" Aquino	12,895	8.45
PDP–Laban	Ayie Tejoso	11,736	7.69
PDP–Laban	Boyet Tolentino	11,547	7.57
PDP–Laban	Lino Mendoza	10,683	7.00
PMP	Mari Goitia	10,244	6.71
PDP–Laban	Pongie Veneal	9,508	6.23
PDP–Laban	Jhun Caridad	9,449	6.19
KDP	Carlos Valdes III	1,921	1.26
Total votes		152,492	100.00

==== Second District ====
City Council Elections in San Juan's Second District
Party	Candidate	Votes	%
PMP	Jana Ejercito	16,080	10.40
PDP–Laban	Bea De Guzman	14,681	9.50
PDP–Laban	Rolando "Totoy" Bernardo	14,217	9.20
PMP	Cris Mathay	13,912	9.00
PMP	Joy Ibuna	13,686	8.85
PMP	Kit Peralta	13,068	8.45
PMP	Allen Silvano	13,003	8.41
PDP–Laban	Rocky Tañada Yam	12,212	7.90
PDP–Laban	Peter Punzalan	11,262	7.29
PDP–Laban	Don Allado	11,234	7.27
PMP	Lino Trinidad	10,699	6.92
PDP–Laban	Owie Laruscain	10,535	6.81
Total votes		154,589	100.00
