= 2025 San Juan, Metro Manila, local elections =

Philippine election

2025 San Juan mayoral election
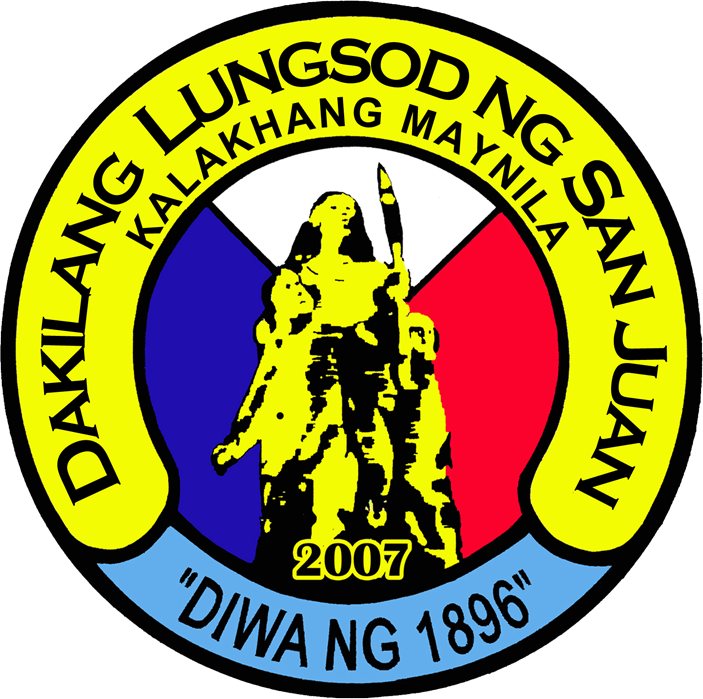
- May 12, 2025
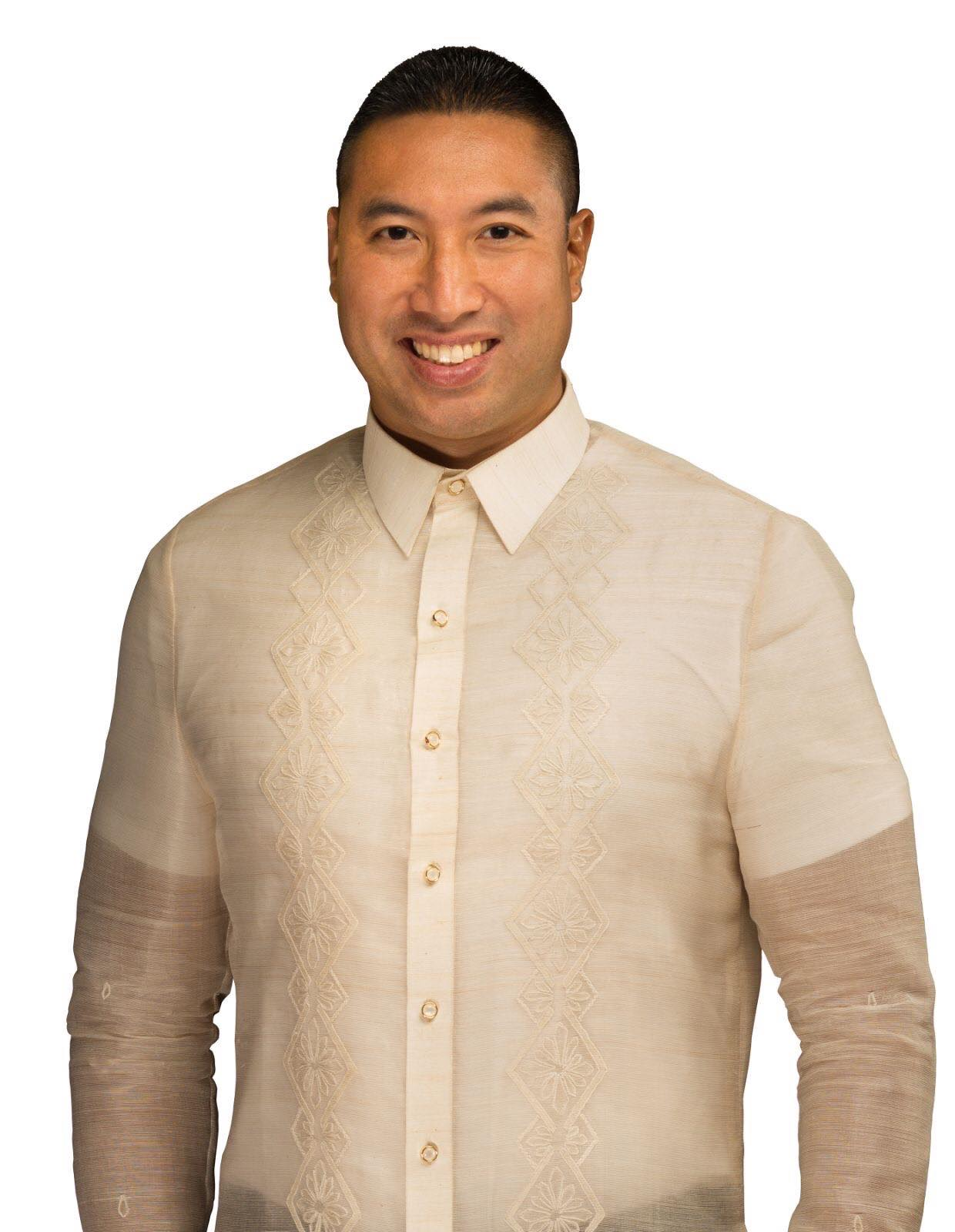

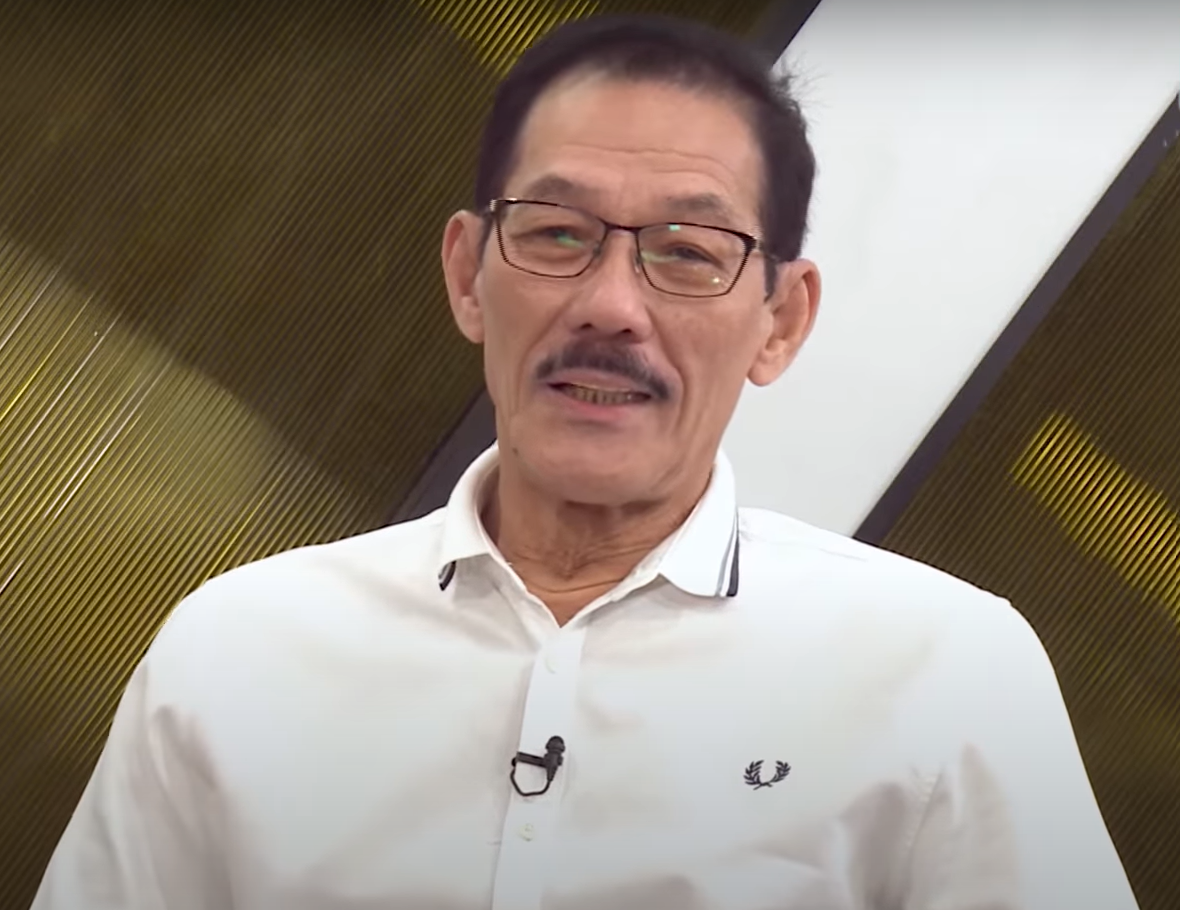
Nominee	Francis Javier Zamora	Philip Cezar
Party	PFP	PMP
Running mate	Angelo Agcaoili
Popular vote	57,998	9,413
Percentage	87.43%	12.57%
Mayor before election
Francis Zamora
PDP
Elected mayor
Francis Zamora
PFP

The 2025 San Juan mayoral election was held on Monday, May 12, 2025, in San Juan, Metro Manila, as part of the 2025 Philippine general election.

Incumbent Mayor Francis Zamora won re-election to a third term, defeating former Vice Mayor Philip Cezar by a wide margin. Vice Mayor Angelo Agcaoili also won his first full term, succeeding the late Jose Warren Villa. In the congressional race, Representative Ysabel Maria "Bel" Zamora-Jornada defeated former Councilor Jana Ejercito for the second consecutive time.

== Background ==
Mayor Francis Zamora ran for re-election for a third term. He ran against former Vice Mayor Philip Cezar.

Vice Mayor Angelo Agcaoili ran for first a full term. He succeeded then-Vice Mayor Jose Warren Villa who died on June 18, 2023. Agcaoili was challenged by independent Candy Crisologo.

Rep. Ysabel Maria "Bel" Zamora-Jornada was challenged by former Councilor Jana Ejercito for the second time.

== Results ==
=== For Representative ===
Rep. Ysabel Maria "Bel" Zamora-Jornada defeated her previous opponent, former Councilor Jana Ejercito, for the second time.

Congressional Elections in San Juan's Lone District
Party	Candidate	Votes	%
Lakas	Ysabel Maria "Bel" Zamora-Jornada	44,545	66.54
PMP	Jana Ejercito	22,403	33.46
Total votes		66,948	100.00
Lakas hold			

=== For Mayor ===
Mayor Francis Zamora defeated former Vice Mayor Philip Cezar.

San Juan Mayoralty Elections
Party	Candidate	Votes	%
PFP	Francis Javier Zamora	57,998	87.43
PMP	Philip Cezar	8,340	12.57
Total votes		66,338	100.00
PFP hold			

=== For Vice Mayor ===
Vice Mayor Angelo Agcaoili won against independent Candy Crisologo.

San Juan Vice Mayoralty Elections
Party	Candidate	Votes	%
PFP	Angelo Agcaoili	48,600	77.45
Independent	Candy Crisologo	14,147	22.55
Total votes		62,747	100.00
PFP hold			

=== For Councilors ===
==== First District ====
City Council Elections in San Juan's First District
Party	Candidate	Votes	%
PFP	Ryan Llanos Dee	19,627	12.48
PFP	James Yap	18,394	11.70
PFP	Boyet Tolentino	17,936	11.41
PFP	Ervic Vijandre	17,372	11.05
PFP	Dennis Pardinez	17,337	11.03
PMP	Vic Reyes	16,359	10.41
PFP	Renren Ritualo	13,539	8.61
PMP	Chesco Velasco	13,326	8.48
PMP	Triccia Dacer	12,339	7.85
PMP	Anton Santiago	10,985	6.99
Total votes		157,214	100.00

==== Second District ====
City Council Elections in San Juan's Second District
Party	Candidate	Votes	%
PFP	Franco Tanada-Yam	24,659	15.54
PFP	Kit Peralta	24,461	15.42
PFP	Bea De Guzman	23,754	14.97
PFP	Totoy Bernardo	22,932	14.45
PFP	Macky Mathay	22,694	14.30
PFP	Don Allado	18,760	11.82
PMP	Magic Villasper	10,203	6.43
Independent	Marvin Dela Cruz	5,940	3.74
Independent	Juanito Violeta III	5,255	15.49
Total votes		158,658	100.00
