= 2010 Philippine Bar exam bombing =

Bombing in Manila, Philippines

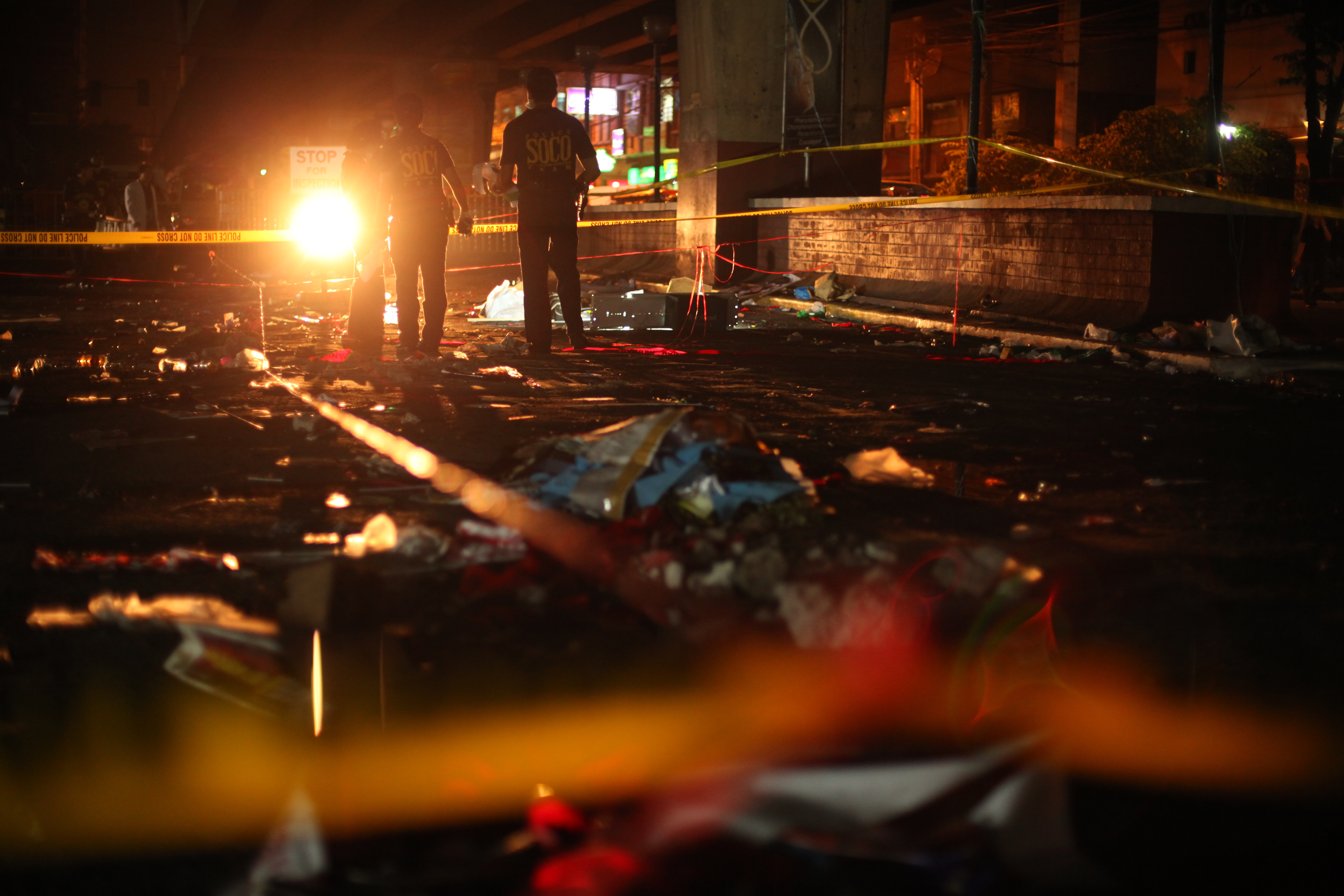
- Police comb the debris for evidence

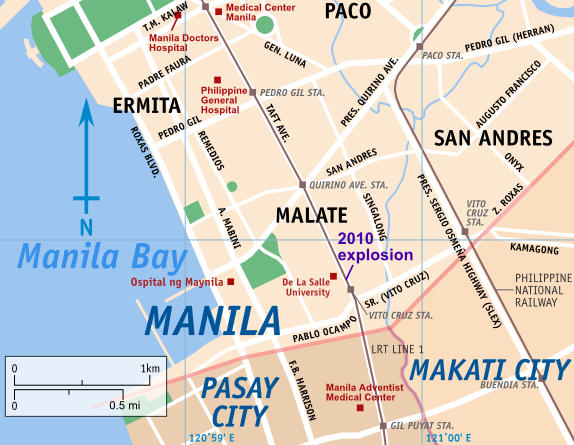
- Locations of the explosion, DLSU, and the hospitals where the victims were brought
- Location: 14°33′49″N 120°59′41″E; Taft Avenue, Malate, Manila, Philippines
- Date: September 26, 2010; 5:05 pm (UTC+08:00)
- Target: Tau Gamma Phi members
- Attack type: School bombing
- Weapon: Mk2 grenade
- Injuries: 47
- No. of participants: 3

The 2010 Philippine Bar exam bombing occurred on Taft Avenue near De La Salle University (DLSU), located in Malate, Manila, Philippines, on September 26, 2010, at 5:05 pm PST, a few minutes after Philippine Bar examinees began exiting DLSU. A Mk2 grenade was thrown at a group of Alpha Phi Beta members from San Beda College. They were standing near Tau Gamma Phi members, who police believed were the real target of the explosive. This resulted in injuries to 47 people, including two who required amputations.

Jed Carlos Lazaga was initially accused of throwing the grenade, based on information received by the Manila Police District (MPD) from an unnamed witness. This theory was later dismissed when the National Bureau of Investigation (NBI) took over the case.

Anthony Leal Nepomuceno, NBI's prime suspect and an Alpha Phi Omega (APO) member, surrendered to Vice President of the Philippines Jejomar Binay on October 27. Binay and former Department of Justice (DOJ) Secretary Silvestre Bello III, both of whom are APO members, joined fellow APO members in asserting Nepomuceno's innocence. Binay's actions were criticized by several members of the House of Representatives of the Philippines, who said Nepomuceno was cleared prematurely. The Office of the President stated that it had no intention to distance Binay from the matter, but clarified that Binay's statements would have no bearing in the investigation.

In a 27-page DOJ resolution, prosecutors found Nepomuceno's defense "weak", and recommended his indictment. DOJ charged him with multiple murder charges (for almost killing the two amputees), multiple attempted murder charges, and illegal possession of explosives.

The 2010 Bar exam was the last to be conducted in De La Salle University before the eventual return of the bar exams in the university in 2022. The 2011 exam was held at the University of Santo Tomas (UST) in November. The Supreme Court denied that the bombing precipitated the move; the change had already been planned before the blast. It also said that "necessary security measures" will be in force in UST to prevent an event similar to the 2010 bombing.

== Background ==
Velasco Hall, one of the buildings used during the Bar exams

De La Salle University is a private La Sallian university located on a 5.45 ha (13.5-acre) campus in Malate, Manila, Philippines. It faces Taft Avenue, a major thoroughfare named after William Howard Taft. DLSU had a population of 888 faculty and 15,779 students in 2009.

The Philippine Bar exams have been held at DLSU since 2002. An average of over 5,000 examinees used its buildings for the test. For the 2010 exam, 5,012 examinees took the test in 121 rooms inside six DLSU buildings. The number of examinees was lower than the 6,080 who took the test in 2009.

== Incident and response ==
The bar exam ended at 5 pm PST. As with tradition, examinees were to be greeted by loud noises as they exit DLSU. By 5:05 pm, a loud explosion occurred in the area where supporters for the San Beda College examinees were standing. Tremors were felt as far as inside the elevated platform of the Vito Cruz LRT Station near DLSU. People in the area thought that the noise was from fireworks that are a normal part of the post-bar celebrations. A commotion followed as people panicked and ran for safety. A bottle-throwing incident also occurred, according to a police spokesman. The window of a street-side shop was shattered. Glass bottles, broken and intact, were scattered around the area as police evacuated people from the scene. The explosion occurred shortly after a fraternity fight near DLSU.

On the day of the explosion, 34 injuries were reported. This figure rose to 47 two days later. Most of the victims were female and members of Alpha Phi Beta, a fraternity from San Beda. Victims who were identified were from 23 to 28 years old. Ospital ng Maynila Medical Center received 17 of the injured; nine were taken to the Philippine General Hospital, five to Medical Center Manila, three to the Manila Doctors Hospital, and one to the Manila Adventist Medical Center. The Manila Police District bomb squad rushed to the site of the blast and cordoned off the area to search the debris for parts of the explosive.

Two persons (Raissa Laurel and Joanna Ledda; both women) underwent leg amputations because of their injuries.

== Reaction ==
We, legitimate fraternities based in major universities and colleges as well as communities nationwide, joins [sic] the Filipino nation in condemning in the strongest possible terms the brutal act of indiscriminate violence, which occurred during street revelry along Taft Avenue marking the end of this year’s bar examinations at the De La Salle University. We denounce this gross display of brutality, which caused severe injury to innocent people and damage to property.

— Joint statement of six fraternities, Philippine Daily Inquirer

The bombing was condemned by the Supreme Court of the Philippines, who called it "an unfortunate incident." The incident was likewise condemned by San Beda Rector Aloysius Maranan, Akbayan Youth Chairperson Marlon Cornelio, and Negros fraternities. Several members of six fraternities gathered at Quezon City on October 1 to participate in a candlelight vigil and express their sympathies.

Renato Corona, Chief Justice of the Supreme Court, said in a statement that he had already ordered the Supreme Court security, the MPD, and the National Bureau of Investigation (NBI) to investigate the matter and "to identify the perpetrators of this senseless act of cowardice, and bring them to the bar of justice." He also ordered a review of the security protocol. Task Force Bar Operations 2010 was created to specifically investigate the incident.

After visiting a number of victims two days after the incident, President Benigno Aquino III called the attack a "heinous crime", as many of the victims were "preparing for their future as productive citizens of our country." He called for the investigators to make the case their top priority and for the perpetrator to surrender.

On October 3, the Fraternal Order of Utopia from Ateneo de Manila University offered a ₱200,000 (US$4,620)-reward to anyone who could present information identifying the perpetrator. Several anonymous donors offered an additional reward of ₱1 million (US$23,100) the next day. Meanwhile, the Supreme Court created an eight-person investigation committee tasked with making a report by October 15.

== Investigation ==
The ID recovered from Jed Carlo Lazaga

Initial police reports considered improvised explosive devices, fireworks, Molotov cocktails, and fragmentation grenades to be possible causes of the explosion. Reports point to a possible cause of the incident to be a conflict between Alpha Phi Omega and Tau Gamma Phi. Armando Macaraeg, chief of the MPD Homicide Division, said that the real targets of the explosion were members of Tau Gamma Phi, and the perpetrator misfired, causing the explosive to hit Alpha Phi Beta members, who were standing nearby.

=== Lazaga accused ===
MPD received from an unnamed witness, who was slightly injured by the blast, reports of a man in a black jacket and white shirt bearing the emblem of Alpha Kappa Rho. This man allegedly threw the explosive from the other side of Taft Avenue, aiming for Tau Gamma Phi members; the throw fell short, hitting the San Beda students instead. People went after the alleged bomber and cornered him. Identification found on the man indicated he was Jed Carlo Lazaga of University of San Jose–Recoletos in Cebu. The witness said that they were not able to surrender the man to the police, because Lazaga's companions carried guns and threatened to shoot people. Lazaga reportedly filed a mauling complaint.

On September 28, the NBI had three unnamed suspects, and had identified the explosive as a Mk2 grenade. On the same day, NBI questioned Alpha Kappa Rho officials, and expressed interest in summoning other fraternities that were present during the incident. Alpha Kappa Rho President Jojo del Rosario acknowledged Lazaga's membership in the fraternity, and revealed that Lazaga is a fourth-year law student. He denied Lazaga's involvement in the blast, saying "why would he even complain to the police if he is guilty? He even lost his wallet, was mauled even" (trans). Del Rosario and his group presented pictures of Lazaga with at least 20 law students and professors of the university before the explosion. Lazaga was shown to be wearing a white shirt with a graphic design, contrary to the witness's claim. This theory was no longer pursued when the NBI took over the MPD investigation.

=== Identification and surrender to Binay ===
On October 19, the NBI released an artist's sketch of the suspect and several other details. The suspect was said to be a 20- to 25-year-old male of medium build 5 feet 6 inches (1.68 m) to 5 feet 7 inches (1.70 m) in height and weighing 60–65 kilograms (132–143 lb). The suspect was given one week to surrender.

Many of those investigated are APO, including him [Nepomuceno]. We are disappointed that he is being accused but based on our interrogation and according to him, I think he is not at fault.

— Jejomar Binay, trans. from Malaya

Anthony Leal Nepomuceno, NBI's prime suspect, surrendered to Jejomar Binay, Vice President of the Philippines and an APO member, on October 27. At the time, Nepomuceno was a 26-year-old call center agent who graduated with a degree in information technology from Manuel L. Quezon University; he was also a member of APO. Nepomuceno denied all accusations. APO defended his innocence, and formed a legal team in response to the NBI complaints. He said that he was inside a mall in Marikina at 5 pm buying shoes—at the same time as the bombing—and withdrew money from a bank at 7:30 pm.

Binay insisted that Nepomuceno was innocent. This position was acknowledged by former Department of Justice (DOJ) Secretary Silvestre Bello III, who earlier pledged to help prosecute him if the evidence was strong. Upon the request of DOJ Secretary Leila de Lima, Binay presented Nepomuceno to the NBI on October 28.

I'm not saying that Nepomuceno is guilty ... the suspect can be cleared upon investigation or probable cause may be found to charge him. So, therefore, I think it would be premature for anybody to say he is innocent.

— CDO Rep. Rufus Rodriguez, Philippine Daily Inquirer

Binay's actions were criticized by several members of the House of Representatives of the Philippines, saying that Binay should have allowed the DOJ and the NBI to finish the investigation before clearing Nepomuceno. Deputy Presidential Spokesperson Abigail Valte said that the Office of the President had no intention of distancing Binay from the matter, but clarified that Binay's statements would have no bearing on the investigation.

=== NBI actions ===
De Lima said that Nepomuceno matches the artist's sketch and the description given earlier, and the evidence against him is strong, as the NBI has at least 17 witnesses. She revealed that an NBI team had earlier gone to Nepomuceno's mother in Marinduque; his mother initially agreed to convince her son to surrender, but later refused to tell his whereabouts. De Lima clarified that Nepomuceno was merely "invited for questioning and not under arrest" since no charges had been filed yet.

On October 28, the NBI filed to the DOJ numerous complaints of frustrated and attempted murder against Nepomuceno based on the testimonies that Nepomuceno threw the grenade. Police studied the possibility that the incident was linked to a fraternity rumble in December 2009, when Cromwell Dukha Jr. from APO was fatally stabbed, allegedly by Efraim Lim, a member of Tau Gamma Phi. Both were from San Sebastian College. Filing the complaint paved way for the start of the preliminary investigation by the DOJ. More suspects were being considered by the NBI as of the time of filing the complaints.

On November 10, the DOJ identified two more APO members as suspects. Their names were not revealed. NBI believes that the two are responsible for Nepomuceno's escape during the incident. De Lima said that ongoing investigations on grenade-throwing incidents at La Consolacion College in 2008 and University of Perpetual Help System DALTA also suggest APO involvement. The two bombings left 22 and 14 wounded, respectively. She noted an "apparent lack of interest" on the part of the APO leadership to cooperate in the investigation.

On the same day, APO responded:

It disappoints us that we cannot really cooperate with Secretary De Lima because when she once said that two APO members were accomplices, they did not even identify who the two were, of the over 150,000 APO members.

— Ferdie Ramos (APO spokesperson), trans. from Sun.Star

== Indictment ==
In a 27-page resolution signed by Prosecutor Gerardo Gaerlan and Senior Deputy State Prosecutor Richard Anthony Fadullon, DOJ found Nepomuceno's defense to be "weak" and recommended for his indictment on April 28, 2011. He was not able to prove that it was physically impossible for him to be present at the time of the bombing, and witnesses were positive that he is the person who threw the grenade. The DOJ said that Nepomuceno's submission of a photocopy of a receipt from a Metrobank ATM in Marikina does not prove his claim that he was not at Taft during the bombing, since the time on the receipt was more than two hours after the bombing. The resolution stated:

Considering that the scene of the crime is at Taft Avenue, Manila, which is more or less 20 kilometers away from Baranka, Marikina, then, it is not physically impossible for the respondent to be at the scene of the crime when the crime was committed, because his alibi of being in Marikina happened only two hours after the crime was committed.

— DOJ resolution on the bombing, Pilipino Star Ngayon

Nepomuceno submitted testimonies to support his claim, but these were dismissed by Gaerlan. He noted that these were mostly from family, friends, and fellow fraternity members. Nepomuceno accused the DOJ investigation of being "irregular and selective" for disregarding other suspects, and labeled one witnesses' statement as "ill-motivated", since the witness was from a rival fraternity. Gaerlan defended the claims as being "evidentiary in nature."

He faces charges of multiple murder (for causing "almost fatal" injuries to two amputees), multiple frustrated murder, multiple attempted murder, and illegal possession of explosives. On July 14, 2015, the Court of Appeals affirmed Nepomuceno's indictment and denied his petition to nullify the 2011 DOJ resolution.

On July 14, 2015, the Court of Appeals affirmed Nepomuceno's indictment and denied his petition to nullify the 2011 DOJ resolution.

== Aftermath ==
Raissa Laurel, a 23-year-old law student from San Sebastian College who lost both her legs due to the event, was given an award for her "courage and strength" by People Asia on its 11th anniversary on January 10. The award was presented by President Benigno Aquino III. Meanwhile, Chief Justice Renato Corona of the Supreme Court pledged to personally administer Laurel's oath if she passes the bar. He promised that the Supreme Court would hire her when she recovers. Nippon Foundation promised to give her prosthetic legs on her birthday on April 23, 2011. She was released from the Philippine General Hospital on November 7, 2010. Laurel ran for city councilor of San Juan in the 2016 local elections, eventually winning a seat after placing third in her district. She was successfully re-elected in 2019 and 2022.

The 2010 Bar exam was the last to be conducted at De La Salle University before the return of bar exams in the university in 2022. The 2011 exam was held in the University of Santo Tomas in November; DLSU ended its contract with the Supreme Court due to construction plans on the campus. Supreme Court spokesman Midas Marquez denied that the bombing was the reason behind the move; the move had been already planned before the blast. He also said that "necessary security measures" will be in force at UST to prevent an event similar to the 2010 bombing.

== See also ==
- 2005 University of Oklahoma bombing
- 2009 International Islamic University bombing
- Sterling Hall bombing
