= Oblation Run =

Nude fraternity protest event in Philippines

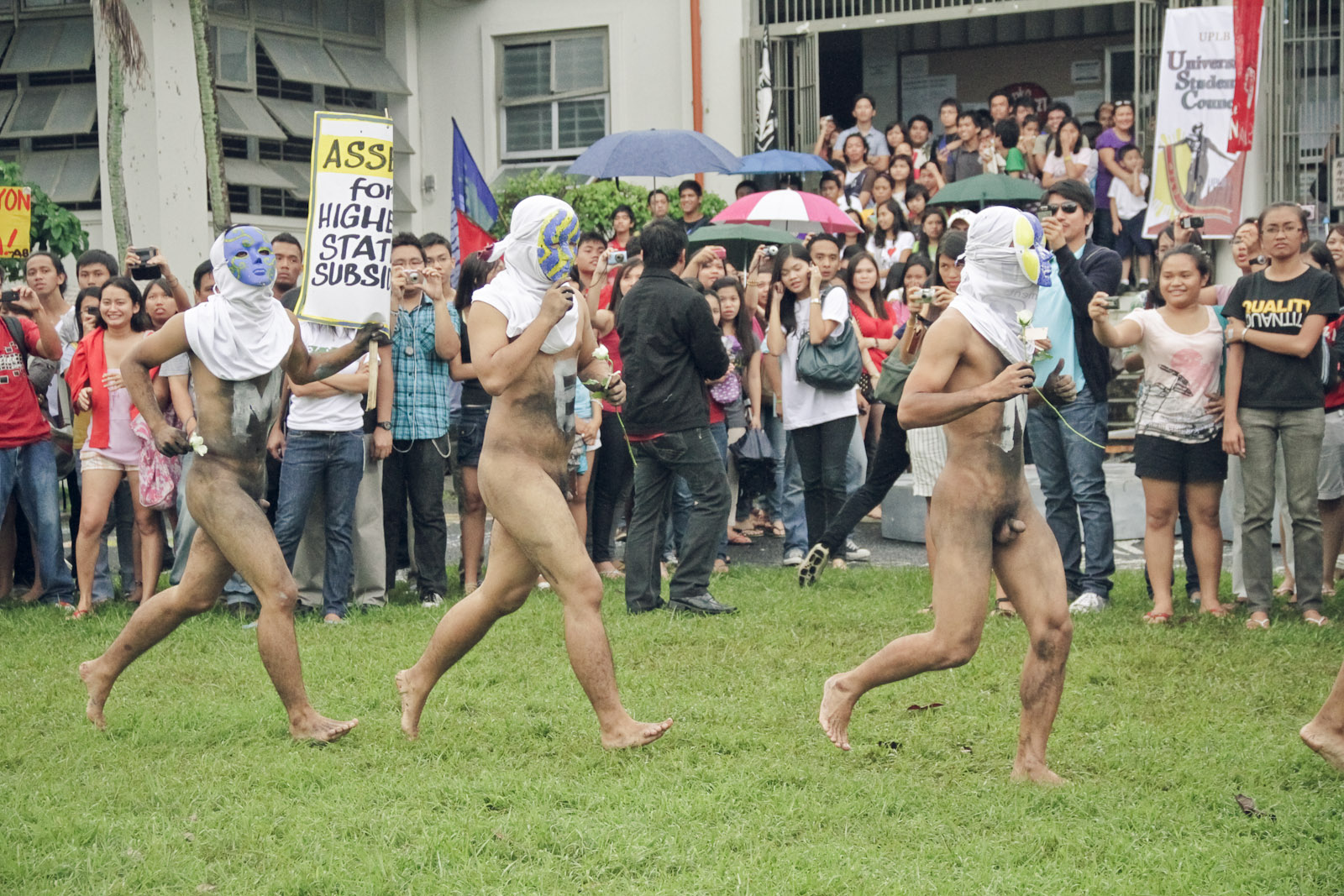
- The 2010 Oblation Run at the University of the Philippines Los Baños
- Genre: Streaking
- Date: December 16
- Frequency: Annual
- Years active: 49
- Inaugurated: 1977
- Participants: 24 (average)
- Attendance: 2,000

The Oblation Run (sometimes referred to as Pylon Run or the Ritual Dance of the Brave) is an annual event held by the University of the Philippines (UP) and Polytechnic University of the Philippines (PUP) chapters of Alpha Phi Omega (APO) on the PUP and different UP campuses. The runners are male, and traditionally run completely naked in public places, with their genitals fully visible, on a designated route. The event was first organized in 1977 at the University of the Philippines Diliman to promote Hubad na Bayani (Tagalog for Naked Hero), a film. It draws its name from the Oblation, a statue of a nude man located in every University of the Philippines campus, which symbolizes "a selfless offering of one's self to the country." The event is usually done on December 16, and serves as a protest to contemporary national issues.

Participants in the Diliman Oblation Run are male APO members numbering 24 on average. Women participating in the event, however, are not unheard of. Runners usually wear masks to hide their identities, and may wear leaves to cover their genitals. They usually hand roses to a number of female spectators. Additional runs are sometimes held at special events, such as the Centennial Run in 2008 where 100 members ran to celebrate the 100th anniversary of UP.

The run has been criticized by Aquilino Pimentel, Jr., a Philippine senator, calling it a "blatant display of male genitals" and a "wanton disregard of the rules of decent society," and comparing it with exhibitionist behaviors that are prohibited by the Revised Penal Code of the Philippines. In line with this, he called for an investigation in March 2009 to determine if the event violated that law.

== History ==
Alpha Phi Omega is a fraternity founded on December 16, 1925 at Lafayette College in Easton, Pennsylvania, United States. The first Philippine APO chapter was chartered on March 2, 1950 at the Far Eastern University in Manila. The Eta chapter was established on February 10, 1953 at UP Diliman. UP Diliman is the main campus of the University of the Philippines, a Philippine state university founded in June 1908. It is particularly known for its student activism.

=== Inception ===
Despite inconsistencies, sources generally agree that the Oblation Run started in 1977. Also known as the Ritual Dance of the Brave, it takes its name from the Oblation, a statue of a nude man unveiled in 1939. Originally completely nude, a fig leaf was added to cover its genitals during UP President Jorge Bocobo's term (1934–1939). It is found in every UP campus, and has since become UP's identifying symbol. The run has since spread to other UP campuses, including Baguio, Los Baños, Manila and Visayas, and non-UP colleges and universities, such as the Polytechnic University of the Philippines, Far Eastern University and Bulacan State University.

According to a 1996 article published by the UP Diliman APO website, the run originated when an unnamed APO member ran naked inside the campus to promote an APO-sponsored play called Hubad na Bayani (Tagalog for Naked Hero). The play is dedicated to Rolly Abad, an APO member who was killed in a brawl a few months earlier. The run was a success so APO decided to stage it every year on the fraternity's anniversary, December 16. This view is supported by a GMA News and Public Affairs report.

A newer account by Oble, a student newspaper of University of the Philippines Baguio, gives a different story. According to a 2011 article of the paper, the first Oblation Run was done by Rolly Abad himself to protest the Ferdinand Marcos's banning of Hubad na Bayani, a play detailing human rights violations during his martial law regime. Rolly Abad would be killed a few months later in a brawl. In his honor, APO decided to stage the run annually and voice contemporary socio-political issues along with it.

Meanwhile, the Philippine Daily Inquirer notes an APO member, Menggie Cobarrubias, saying "We [I and four others] started it as a prank when the Marcos dictatorship did not allow the showing of the play, Hubad na Bayani." The play was a political satire against Marcos.

An Associated Press article likewise details a different version of the story. According to Oliver Teves who wrote the article, the run started as a stunt to promote Hubad na Bayani, a film that depicted oppressed plantation workers. Similar to the account by Oble, the film was banned by Marcos. Similarly, the Internet Movie Database lists Hubad na Bayani as 1977 film directed by Robert Arevalo. It reportedly won the 1978 Gawad Urian Awards for best picture, best production design and best screenplay.

=== Participation of women ===
The two women who ran naked during the 2005 Oblation Run at UP Diliman

During the December 2005 Oblation Run at UP Diliman, two unidentified naked women, according to Philstar, Koreans, were seen tailing 30 members who were part of the event. This is the first ever instance that women took part in the occasion. The two, wearing masks to hide their identities, held banners promoting equal rights for women. After posing for photographers, they entered a car which then sped off. The act, however, was condemned by APO.

We are condemning their act not on gender issues because they are women, they can do run naked if they want to. But the event [Oblation Run] was supposed to be ours.

— Joselito Caparino (APO media liaison officer), The Philippine Star

=== Centennial Run ===
To celebrate the University of the Philippines centennial, 100 APO members ran half a mile around the Diliman campus on June 18, 2008. This is the largest Oblation Run in its history in terms of number of participants. The participants started running on 11 AM PST from Vinzons Hall to the Oblation statue in front of Quezon Hall, the UP administration building. Several runners carried placards stating "Serve the People" and raised social issues, including appeals for greater state subsidy of education and ouster of then-President of the Philippines Gloria Macapagal Arroyo. The event was observed by senior APO alumni, including Jejomar Binay who was the mayor of Makati.

== Event ==
The Oblation Run is usually held on December 16, in honor of the international founding of Alpha Phi Omega on December 16, 1925. The date may be changed if December 16 falls on a weekend. The run may also be held in concurrence with other significant events, such as APO's national anniversary on March, an APO chapter's anniversary, and occasions significant to their home university. Runners usually bear masks to hide their identities, and may wear leaves to cover their genitals. They usually hand roses to a number of female spectators.

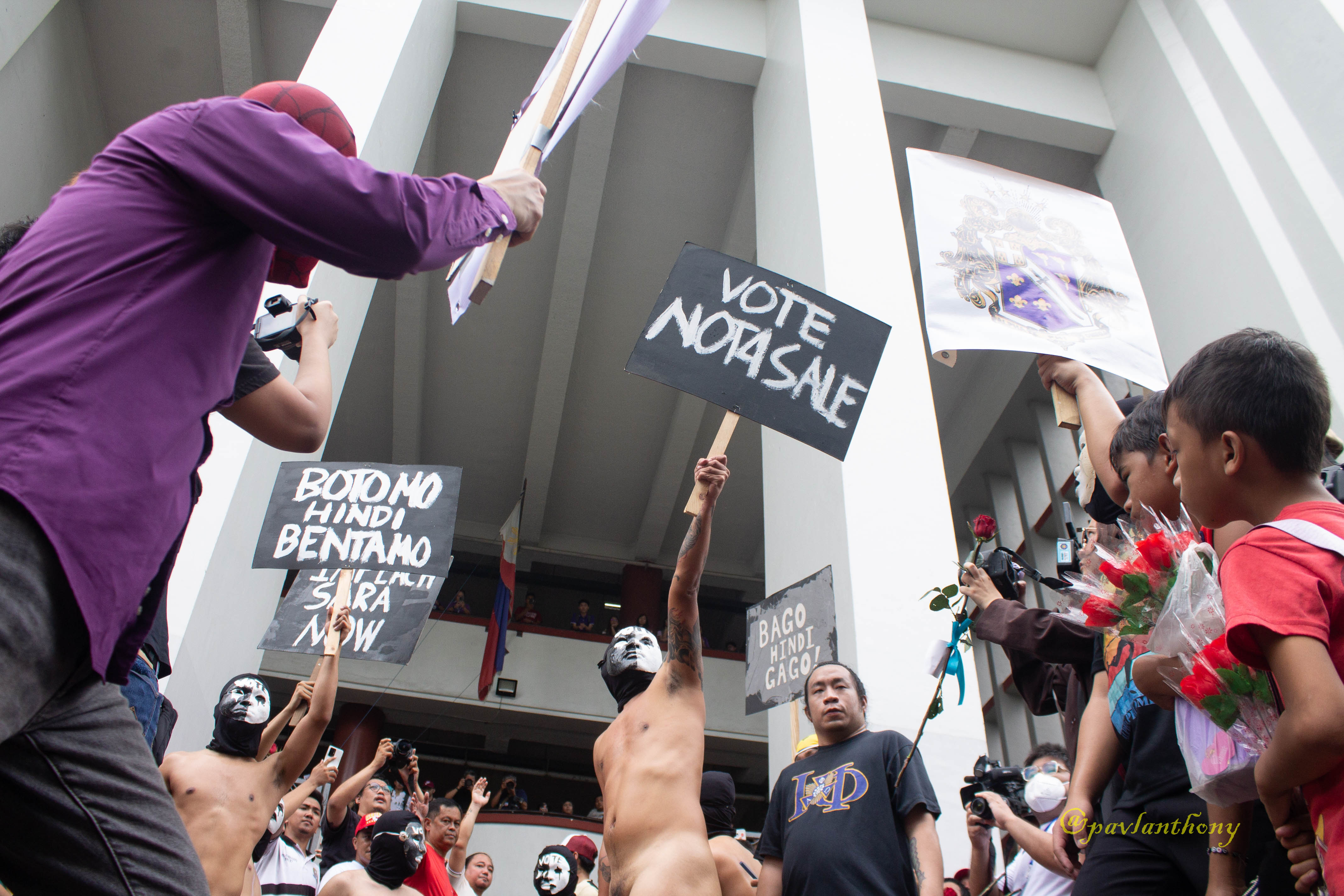
Members of the Alpha Phi Omega fraternity conducting the annual Oblation Run Protest last February 14, 2025 in Palma Hall, University of the Philippines Diliman

Contrary to popular belief, neophytes are forbidden to run.

All those who run are full pledged [sic] members who have volunteered. There is a misconception that the Oblation Run is something our neophytes have to undergo as part of their initiation. That's not true. We never allow our applicants to join [the Oblation Run].

— Ojie Santillan, APO Auxiliary Chancellor

As a sign of protest, it has called attention to several national issues including appeals for the ouster of former President Joseph Estrada, justice for the victims of the Maguindanao massacre and the 2010 Philippine Bar exam bombing.

== Themes ==
=== UP Diliman Campus ===
- 2019 (February 8) Protection of freedom of expression and self-determination.
- 2017 End drug-related killings, rebuild war-torn Marawi City, lift martial law in Mindanao, and resume the peace talks between the government and the Communist Party.
- 2016 Condemnation of former dictator Ferdinand Marcos' burial at the Libingan ng mga Bayani, and justice for Martial Law victims.
- 2015 "Huwad na daan" and "Hubad na daan"
- 2014 Accountability and sustained action on the part of those in power to respect the rule of law.
- 2013 Better disaster risk reduction and management
- 2012 Free, fair and clean 2013 national elections
- 2011 "A Run for Philippine Rivers"
- 2010 Justice for the victims of the 2010 Philippine Bar exam bombing.
- 2009 Justice for the victims of the Maguindanao massacre
- 2008 Opposing Charter Change particularly to any extension of the term of President Gloria Macapagal Arroyo
- 2007 Ouster of President Gloria Macapagal Arroyo and others.
- 2006 Protest against the University of the Philippines tuition increase, Charter change, and the withholding of funds of the Philippine Collegian
- 2005 "Merry Christmas ???", three question marks represent the budget cut for the tuition of the Iskolar ng Bayan ("Scholars of the Nation") the backpay and cost of living allowance woes of the University of the Philippines employees; and the implementation of the EVAT
- 2004 "Environment Restoration and Social Justice for Hacienda Luisita Victims"
- 2003 Clean and peaceful elections (and others)
- 2002 "No to Budget Cuts"
- 2001 "Stop Corruption! Transparency in the Government"/"Walang Ku-Corrupt"
- 2000 "Erap Resign"/Ouster of President Joseph Estrada
- 1999 Calling attention to University of the Philippines Budget Cuts
- 1995 Stop Fraternity Violence

== Polytechnic University of the Philippines ==
Polytechnic University of the Philippines holds the same version of event known as Pylon Run, organized by the PUP chapter of Alpha Phi Omega (Philippines). The event usually held at PUP's foundation day on October 1, situated in the grounds of main building.

- 2018 "Kapatiran at Bayan" (Brotherhood and Nation)
- 2017 Good governance, Respect of Human rights and Better quality of education
- 2016 Respect human dignity and rule of law.
- 2013 Abolishment of the priority development assistance fund, a known pork barrel program.

== Criticism ==
I ask the UP administration why they allow students to publicly go naked and display their private parts. What benefit does this public institution, paid by people's money, get out of it [the Oblation Run]?

— Aquilino Pimentel, Jr., Pilipino Star Ngayon

On March 2009, the Oblation Run was criticized by Aquilino Pimentel, Jr., a Philippine senator, calling it a "blatant display of male genitals" and a "wanton disregard of the rules of decent society." He noted that the Oblation Run, being a public event, was being viewed by young children and "innocent audiences, young and old," comparing it with exhibitionist behaviors that are prohibited by the Revised Penal Code of the Philippines. He also said that it was discriminatory against women.

Pimentel's position was supported by officials of the Catholic Church. For instance, Tagbilaran Bishop Leonardo Medroso identified it as "malicious" and "morally lacking." Like Pimintel, he cited that "innocent youths" are among the spectators of the run. He said that "it could be done in a more decent way without showing their nude bodies" (trans). Lingayen-Dagupan Archbishop Oscar V. Cruz supports this view.

In line with this, he called for an investigation on March 2009 to determine if the event violates the said law. He sought "to sanction the parties responsible, including the university authorities, for failure to exercise their bounden duty to see it that the laws and rules of this country prevail." The Oblation Run was defended by Senator Francis Pangilinan, a former UP Student Council president. He argued that the run is not obscene because the runners were merely exercising their freedom of expression.

I do not feel that students from a Catholic school should be running around the streets naked. It does not show our Christian values in the community.

— Salvador Curutchet, GMA News

In 2010, Salvador Curutchet of the Institute of the Incarnate Word banned De La Salle Araneta University students from participating in the run. Two years prior to banning it in 2010, the APO chapter of De La Salle held the Oblation Run after obtaining a permit from the city government of Malabon. This was in celebration of its 50th anniversary since the university recognized the fraternity. In response to the ban, the chapter held a luncheon on its 2010 anniversary instead of a nude run.

Similarly, there used to be an Oblation Run conducted in Taft Avenue, Manila in support of the APO members taking the bar examinations. However, it has been of prohibited since 2008 by the city government of Manila due to complaints from examinees and their guests regarding "the unnecessary noise and obscenity of the said oblation run."
