= Ervic Vijandre =

Filipino actor, basketball player, and politician

The Honorable Ervic Vijandre
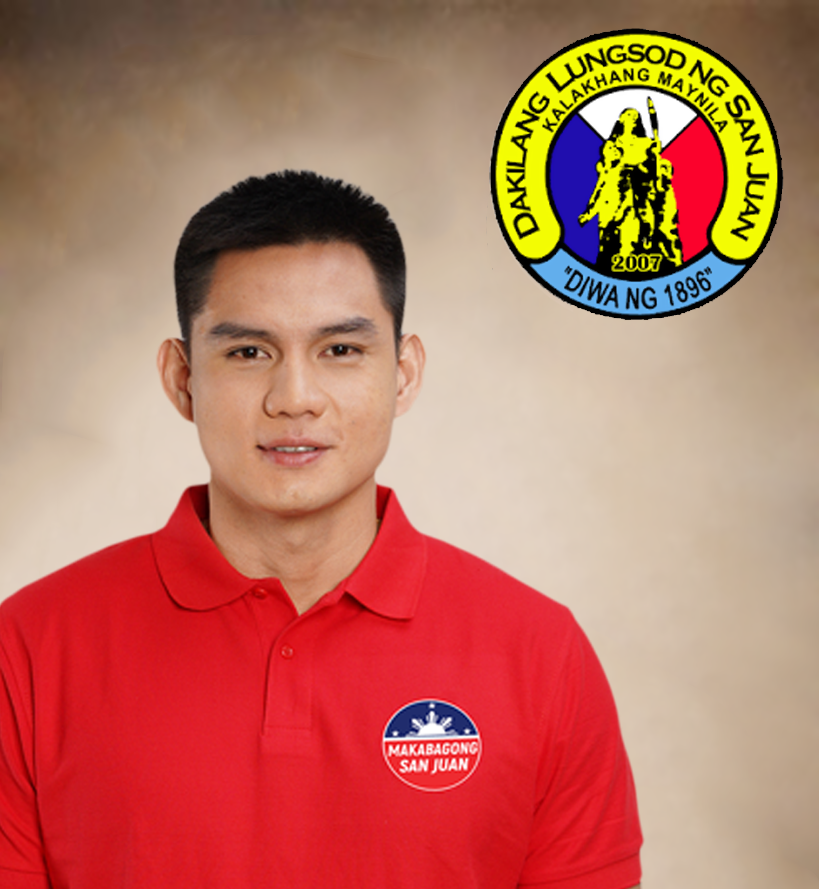
- Official portrait, 2022

Member of the San Juan City Council from the 1st district
- Incumbent
- Assumed office June 30, 2022

Personal details
- Born: John Ervic Manalo Vijandre; January 26, 1986 (age 40) Taguig, Metro Manila, Philippines
- Party: Partido Federal ng Pilipinas (2024–present); Makabagong San Juan (local party)
- Other political affiliations: PDP–Laban (2021–2024); Kilusang Diwa ng Taguig (2013)
- Height: 1.93 m (6 ft 4 in)
- Occupation: Model; actor; Basketball player; entrepreneur; politician
- Nickname(s): John, Ervic
- Basketball career

No. 30 – Marikina Shoemasters
- Position: Shooting guard
- League: MPBL

Personal information
- Listed height: 6 ft 4 in (1.93 m)
- Listed weight: 180 lb (82 kg)

Career information
- College: De La Salle
- PBA draft: 2013: 3rd round, 29th overall pick
- Drafted by: Rain or Shine Elasto Painters
- Playing career: 2011–present

Career history
- 2011–2012: Erase Placenta
- 2012–2013; 2015–2016: Wang's Basketball Couriers
- 2018–2022: GenSan Warriors
- 2022–present: Marikina Shoemasters

John Ervic Manalo Vijandre (born January 26, 1986) is a Filipino professional basketball player, actor, model, and politician. As a basketball player, he plays for the Marikina Shoemasters of the Maharlika Pilipinas Basketball League (MPBL). As a politician, he serves as a councilor of San Juan, Metro Manila from its first district since 2022.

== Filmography ==
=== Television ===
Year	Title	Role
2010	Survivor Philippines: Celebrity Showdown	Himself / Castaway / Runner Up
2011	Party Pilipinas	Himself / Performer
2011	Mars Ravelo's Captain Barbell	Ricky Alejandre / Kidlat
2011	Spooky Nights Presents: Ang Munting Mahadera	Carlos
2011–2012	Ruben Marcelino's Kokak	Borge
2012	Broken Vow	David Sebastian
2012	The Good Daughter	Mario Escobar
2012–2013	Aso ni San Roque	SPO4 Robert Tolentino
2012	Magpakailanman: The Lucy Aroma Story	Jose Aroma
2013	Binoy Henyo	Lito De Guzman
2013	Kahit Nasaan Ka Man	Benjo
2013	Genesis	Ka Blanco
2014	Rhodora X	Dr. Ferdinand "Ferds" Salazar
2014	My Destiny	Rocky
2015	Kailan Ba Tama ang Mali?	Joseph Dela Cruz
2015	Maynila: Substitute for Love	
2015	Magpakailanman: 8Gay Pride	Michael
2015	My Mother's Secret	Edwin Lopez
2015	Beautiful Strangers	Mark
2016	Poor Señorita	Jordan
2016	A1 Ko Sa 'Yo	Erroll
2016	Encantadia	Icarus
2017	Destined to be Yours	Elton
2017	Wish Ko Lang: Pride	Macky
2018	The One That Got Away	Joni Sibuyan
2018	Contessa	Enzo
2018–2019	Cain at Abel	Alex
2019	The Better Woman	Rafael "Paeng" Amante
2020	Madrasta	Doctor
2021	Ang Dalawang Ikaw	young Ernesto
2023	The Seed of Love	Armando "Mandy" Cruzado
2023—2024	Black Rider	Hector Santos-Dimaculangan
2024	Love. Die. Repeat.	Jerome Sandoval

=== Film ===
Year	Title	Role
2011	Shake, Rattle & Roll 13	Pey
2011	Tween Academy: Class of 2012	Dante
2012	My Cactus Heart	Romeo
2012	The Mommy Returns	Rodel
2012	The Reunion	Edilberto
2022	The Buy Bust Queen	Aldrin Dimaano

== Basketball career ==
Vijandre played for Wang's Basketball Couriers of the PBA D-League in 2012. His career high was 22 points. He was drafted by Rain or Shine Elasto Painters in 2013 in the second round as the 29th pick, but was later waived.

Vijandre played for the Congress-LGU Legislators and LGU Vanguards in the UNTV Cup as a celebrity guest player.

Vijandre played for the GenSan Warriors in the MPBL in 2018 as a celebrity basketball player.

== Political career ==
Vijandre's first political venture was in 2013 when he ran for a seat in Taguig city council. He joined the local party Kilusang Diwa ng Taguig and included in then-mayoral candidate Rica Tiñga's ticket for the city's first district. However, he lost when he got the 10th place in the official count. (Taguig's city council is composed of 8 members per district)

In the 2022 elections, Vijandre decided to run again for a seat in the city council, this time, in San Juan. He joined PDP-Laban and included in Mayor Francis Zamora's Makabagong San Juan ticket. He managed to get the 5th place in the official count and proclaimed as councilor-elect for the city's 1st district.
