= 2016 San Juan, Metro Manila, local elections =

Philippine election

2016 San Juan mayoral election
- May 9, 2016
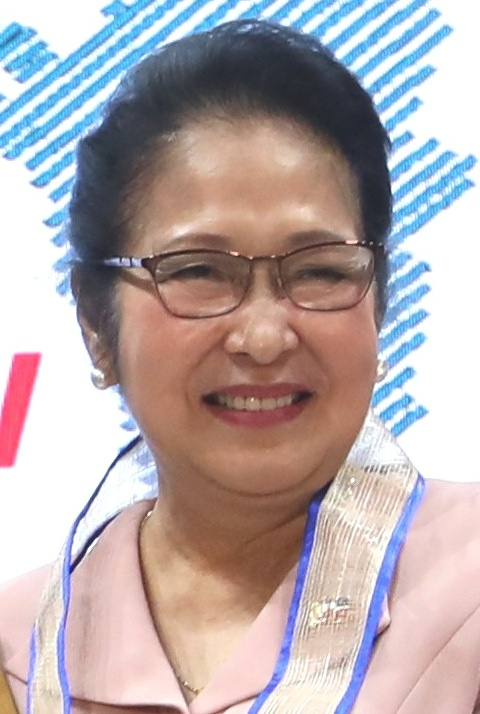

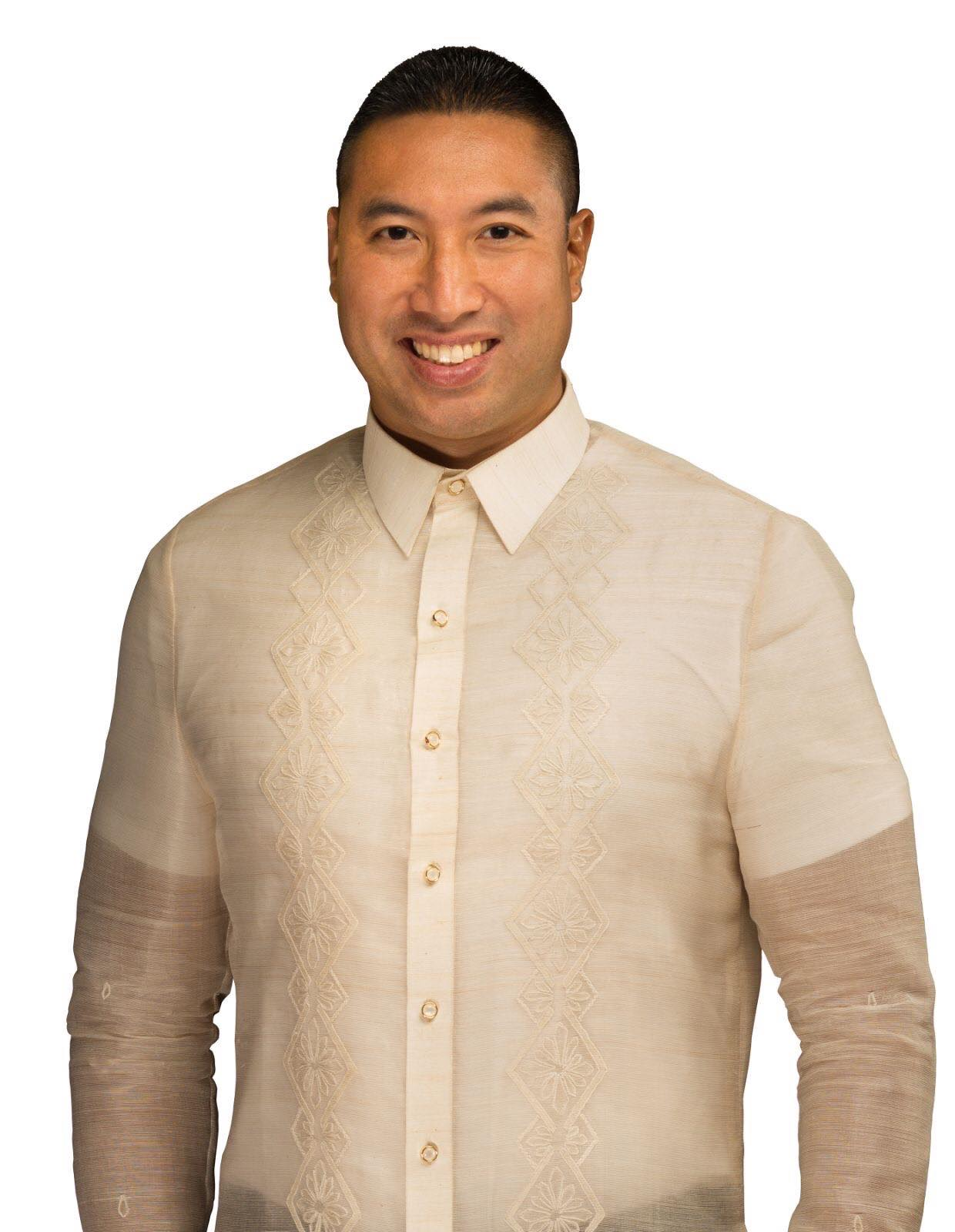
Nominee	Guia Gomez	Francis Zamora
Party	PMP	Nacionalista
Running mate	Janella Ejercito	Rolando "Totoy" Bernardo
Popular vote	28,828	27,604
Percentage	51.08%	48.92%
Mayor before election
Guia Gomez
PMP
Elected mayor
Guia Gomez
PMP

Local elections were held in San Juan on May 9, 2016 within the Philippine general election. The voters elected for the elective local posts in the city: the mayor, vice mayor, the congressman, and the councilors, six of them in the two legislative districts of San Juan.

== Background ==
On September 30, 2015, the current city mayor Guia Gomez, declared that she will run again for the mayoralty seat in the elections, in a political convention held in the Filoil Flying V Arena. Her running mate is incumbent Councilor Janella Ejercito, daughter of Senator Jinggoy Estrada. Gomez is actively supporting the candidacy of Liberal Party presidential candidate Mar Roxas, despite being part of Pwersa ng Masang Pilipino which have been affiliated with the United Nationalist Alliance (UNA) party of fellow presidentiable Jejomar Binay.

Few days later, on October 6, 2015, during the gathering held in San Juan Gym, Vice Mayor Francis Zamora declared his intention to run as Mayor of San Juan, he promised to end the Estrada dynasty in the city who ruled the political landscape for over 46 years. He will be running for the mayoralty seat, against mayor Gomez who is seeking another term for the position. He said that the slogan of San Juan under the reigns of the Estradas, "San Juan Todo Asenso" had no entire progress upon it in the city's economy.

His father Ronaldo Zamora, will seek re-election as congressman, against Jana Ejercito, the cousin of Senators Jinggoy Ejercito Estrada and JV Ejercito.

Vice Mayor Zamora, requested to the PNP on the inclusion of the city in the election hotspots, but the PNP leadership rejects the proposal.

Zamora also proposed a public debate against Gomez to present the platforms for the city's progress. Gomez has yet to be responded to the invitation.

== Results ==
=== For Representative, Lone District ===
Rep. Ronaldo "Ronny" Zamora defeated Jana Ejercito.

Congressional Elections in San Juan's Lone District
Party	Candidate	Votes	%
Nacionalista	Ronaldo "Ronny" Zamora	31,172	56.63
PMP	Jana Ejercito	22,922	41.64
Independent	George Cordero	952	1.73
Total votes		55,046	100.00

=== For Mayor ===
Mayor Guia Gomez defeated Vice Mayor Francis Zamora with a thin margin.

San Juan Mayoralty Election
Party	Candidate	Votes	%
PMP	Guia Gomez	28,828	51.08
Nacionalista	Francis Zamora	27,604	48.92
Total votes		56,432	100.00

=== For Vice Mayor ===
Councilor Janella Ejercito-Estrada defeated her fellow councilor, Rolando "Totoy" Bernardo in vice-mayoral race.

San Juan Vice Mayoralty Election
Party	Candidate	Votes	%
PMP	Janella Ejercito-Estrada	29,939	55.91
Nacionalista	Totoy Bernardo	20,505	38.29
Independent	Glenn Angeles	3,105	5.80
Total votes		53,549	100.00

=== For Councilors (Candidates) ===
==== Puso ng San Juan ====
Pwersa ng Masang Pilipino/Puso ng San Juan 1st District
Name	Party	Result
Angelo Agcaoili	PMP	won
William Go	PMP	won
Raissa Laurel-Subijano	PMP	won
Vincent Pacheco	PMP	won
Ruel Sumaguingsing	PMP	lost
Edith Velasco	PMP	lost

Pwersa ng Masang Pilipino/Puso ng San Juan 2nd District
Name	Party	Result
Beeboy Bargas	PMP	lost
Doni Carballo	NPC	lost
Boy Celles	PMP	won
Cris Mathay	PMP	won
Richie Peralta	PMP	won
Allen Silvano	PMP	won

==== Team San Juan ====
Nacionalista Party/Team San Juan 1st District
Name	Party	Result
Armando Adonis	Nacionalista	lost
Boyet Aquino	Nacionalista	won
Paul Anthony Artadi	Nacionalista	won
AJ Dela Cruz	Nacionalista	lost
Dambu Jucutan	Nacionalista	lost
Onil Mendoza	Nacionalista	lost

Nacionalista Party/Team San Juan 2nd District
Name	Party	Result
Pia Gil	Nacionalista	lost
Joy Ibuna	Nacionalista	won
Lance Raymundo	Nacionalista	lost
Warren Villa	Nacionalista	won
Ericka Villongco	Nacionalista	lost
Allan Yam	Nacionalista	lost

=== For Councilors (Results) ===
==== First District ====
City Council Election in San Juan's First District
Party	Candidate	Votes	%
PMP	Angelo Agcaoili	16,670	
PMP	Vincent Pacheco	15,356	
PMP	Raissa Laurel-Subijano	14,374	
PMP	William Go	12,397	
Nacionalista	Boyet Aquino	11,603	
Nacionalista	Paul Anthony Artadi	11,547	
Independent	Vic Reyes	10,432	
PMP	Ruel "RS" Sumaguingsing	10,060	
PMP	Edith Velasco	8,452	
Nacionalista	Marie O'Neal "Onil" Mendoza	7,770	
Nacionalista	AJ Dela Cruz	7,633	
Nacionalista	Dambu Jucutan	5,903	
Nacionalista	Armando Adonis	5,049	
Independent	Pilar Ebarrete	1,675	
Total votes		138,921	100.00

==== Second District ====
City Council Election in San Juan's Second District
Party	Candidate	Votes	%
PMP	Cris Mathay	15,710	
PMP	Leonardo "Boy" Celles	13,460	
Nacionalista	Joy Ibuna	13,191	
PMP	Allen Silvano	13,186	
Nacionalista	Jose Warren Villa	13,122	
PMP	Richard Peralta	13,095	
Nacionalista	Allan Yam	10,273	
NPC	Doni Carballo	9,266	
Nacionalista	Lance Raymundo	8,396	
Independent	Christopher "Inday Garutay" Borja	8,323	
PMP	Beeboy Bargas	8,284	
Nacionalista	Pia Gil	7,962	
Nacionalista	Ericka Villongco	7,490	
PDP–Laban	Franz Belgica	2,162	
Independent	Joseph Pe	1,719	
Independent	Marvin Dela Cruz	1,242	
Total votes		146,881	100.00
