= 2022 San Juan, Metro Manila, local elections =

Philippine election

2022 San Juan mayoral election
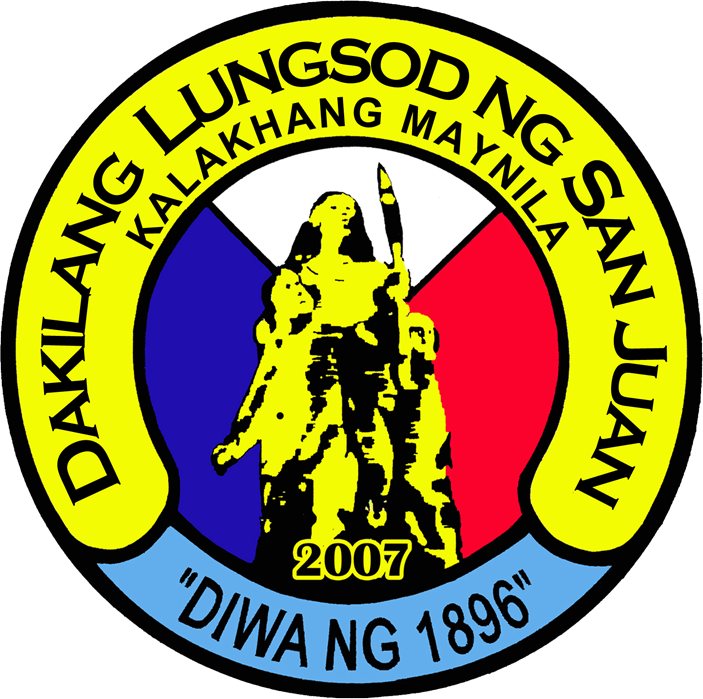
- May 9, 2022
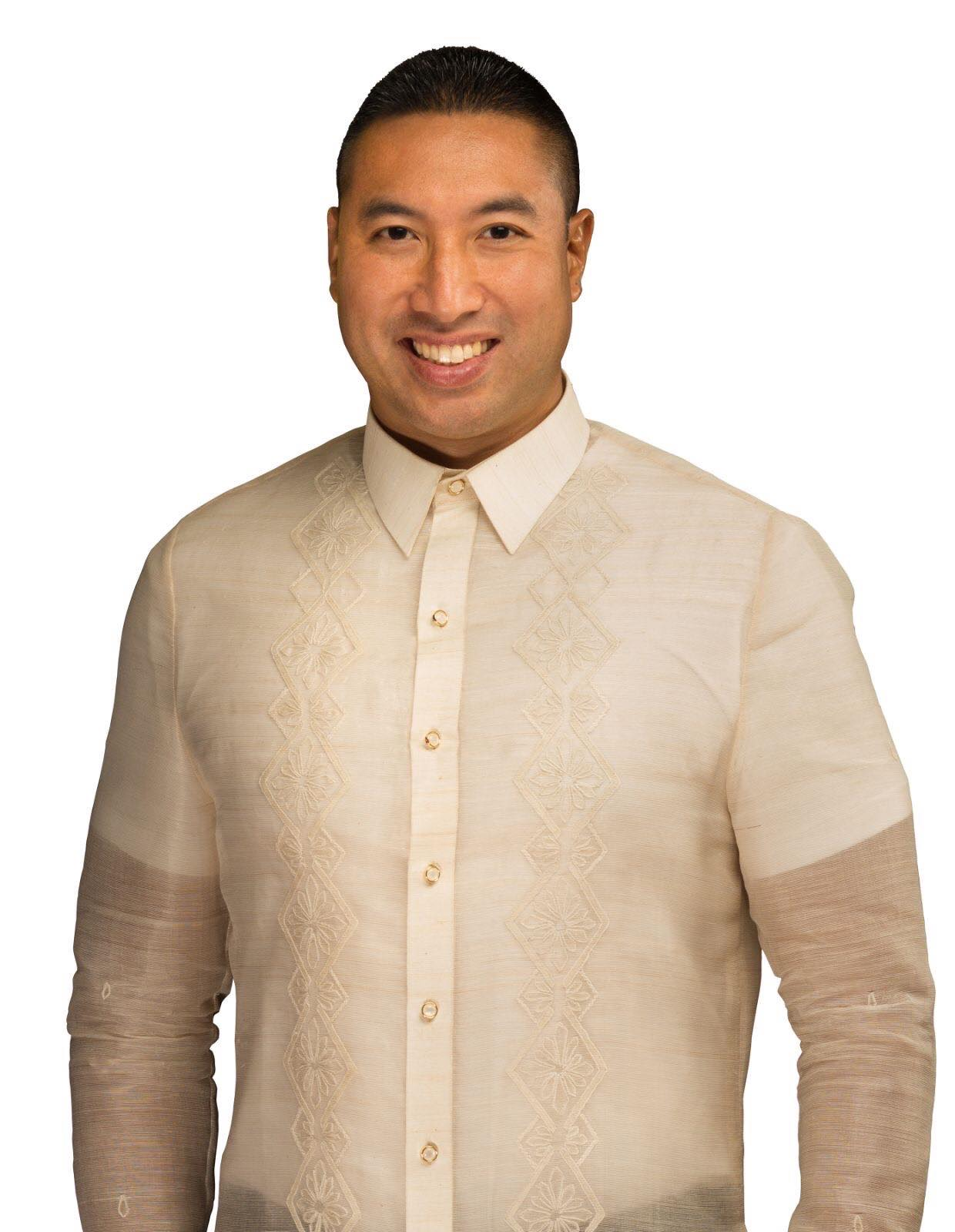
		PMP
Nominee	Francis Zamora	Felix Usman
Party	PDP–Laban	PMP
Running mate	Jose Warren Villa	Philip Cezar
Popular vote	66,883	9,413
Percentage	88.66%	12.34%
Mayor before election
Francis Zamora
PDP–Laban
Elected mayor
Francis Zamora
PDP–Laban

Local elections were held in San Juan on Monday, May 9, 2022, as part of the 2022 Philippine general election.

== Background ==
Incumbent Francis Zamora was elected mayor of San Juan in 2019 and will seek a second consecutive term. He will face former Batis barangay councilor and current San Juan Knights team manager Felix "Jun" Usman, who will represent the Ejercito family-led group.

== Candidates ==
=== Administration coalition ===
Makabagong San Juan (Team Zamora)
#	Name	Party
For House Of Representatives
2.	Bel Zamora	PDP–Laban
For Mayor
2.	Francis Zamora	PDP–Laban
For Vice Mayor
2.	Warren Villa	PDP–Laban
For Councilor 1st District
1.	Angelo Agcaoili	PDP–Laban
2.	Paul Artadi	PDP–Laban
7.	Raissa Laurel-Subijano	PDP–Laban
8.	Ryan Llanos Dee	PDP–Laban
12.	Ervic Vijandre	PDP–Laban
13.	James Yap	PDP–Laban
For Councilor 2nd District
1.	Don Allado	PDP–Laban
3.	Totoy Bernardo	PDP–Laban
7.	Bea De Guzman	PDP–Laban
9.	Macky Mathay	PDP–Laban
11.	Kit Peralta	PDP–Laban
13.	Franco Yam	PDP–Laban

=== Primary opposition coalition ===
Una San Juan (Team Ejercito)
#	Name	Party
For House Of Representatives
1.	Jana Ejercito	NPC
For Mayor
1.	Felix Usman	PMP
For Vice Mayor
1.	Philip Cezar	PMP
For Councilor 1st District
4.	Lou Fiedelan Mariñas	PMP
5.	William Go	PMP
6.	Mari Goitia	PMP
9.	Vic Reyes	PMP
10.	Dante Santiago	PMP
11.	Chesco Velasco	PMP
For Councilor 2nd District
4.	Inday Garutay Borja	PMP
5.	Boy Celles	PMP
6.	Candy Crisologo	PMP
8.	Joy Ibuna	PMP
10.	William Pangilinan	PMP
12.	Sophia Rebullida	PMP

=== Other candidates ===
Lakas–CMD
#	Name	Party
For Councilor 2nd District
2.	Bong Belgica	Lakas

Independent
#	Name	Party
For Councilor 1st District
3.	Triccia Dacer	Independent

== Results ==
=== For Representative ===
Bel Zamora defeated Jana Ejercito, the only member of the Ejercito clan who ran for the local post in San Juan.

Congressional Elections in San Juan's Lone District
Party	Candidate	Votes	%
PDP–Laban	Bel Zamora	49,334	64.52%
NPC	Jana Ejercito	27,133	35.48%
Total votes		76,467	100.00
PDP–Laban hold			

=== For Mayor ===
Mayor Francis Zamora defended his seat against Felix Usman.

San Juan Mayoralty Elections
Party	Candidate	Votes	%
PDP–Laban	Francis Zamora	66,883	88.66%
PMP	Felix Usman	9,413	12.34%
Total votes		76,296	100.00
PDP–Laban hold			

=== For Vice Mayor ===
Vice Mayor Jose Warren Villa won for his second term against former Vice Mayor Philip Cezar.

San Juan Vice Mayoralty Elections
Party	Candidate	Votes	%
PDP–Laban	Jose Warren Villa	55,920	77.10%
PMP	Philip Cezar	16,608	22.90%
Total votes		72,528	100.00
PDP–Laban hold			

=== For Councilors ===
Party	Votes	%	Seats
Partido Demokratiko Pilipino-Lakas ng Bayan	268,840	67.34	12
Pwersa ng Masang Pilipino	114,934	28.79	0
Lakas-CMD	3,634	0.91	0
Independent	11,797	2.96	0
Ex officio seats			2
Total	399,205	100.00	14

==== First District ====
City Council Elections in San Juan's First District
Party	Candidate	Votes	%
PDP–Laban	Angelo Agcaoili	25,912	31.95
PDP–Laban	Paul Artadi	23,247	28.66
PDP–Laban	Raissa Laurel-Subijano	23,174	28.57
PDP–Laban	James Yap	21,427	26.42
PDP–Laban	Ervic Vijandre	18,016	22.21
PDP–Laban	Ryan Llanos Dee	17,666	21.78
PMP	Vic Reyes	14,479	17.85
Independent	Triccia Dacer	11,797	14.55
PMP	Chesco Velasco	11,285	13.91
PMP	William Go	9,802	12.09
PMP	Dante Santiago	9,488	11.70
PMP	Mari Goitia	3,892	4.80
PMP	Lou Fiedelan Mariñas	3,438	4.24
Total votes		193,623	100.00

Party	Votes	%	Seats
Partido Demokratiko Pilipino-Lakas ng Bayan	129,442	66.85	6
Pwersa ng Masang Pilipino	52,384	27.05	0
Independent	11,797	6.09	0
Total	193,623	100.00	6

==== Second District ====
City Council Elections in San Juan's Second District
Party	Candidate	Votes	%
PDP–Laban	Franco Tanada-Yam	25,367	31.28
PDP–Laban	Kit Peralta	24,749	30.52
PDP–Laban	Macky Mathay	23,346	28.79
PDP–Laban	Bea De Guzman	23,336	28.77
PDP–Laban	Rolando "Totoy" Bernardo	22,331	27.53
PDP–Laban	Don Allado	20,269	24.99
PMP	Joy Ibuna-Leoy	15,193	18.73
PMP	Leonardo "Boy" Celles	12,857	15.85
PMP	Christopher "Inday Garutay" Borja	12,559	15.49
PMP	Candy Crisologo	8,117	10.01
PMP	Sophia Rebullida	7,202	8.88
PMP	Walter Pangilinan	6,622	8.16
Lakas	Franz Gurrea "Bong" Belgica	3,634	4.48
Total votes		205,582	100.00

Party	Votes	%	Seats
Partido Demokratiko Pilipino-Lakas ng Bayan	139,398	67.81	6
Pwersa ng Masang Pilipino	62,550	30.43	0
Lakas-CMD	3,634	1.77	0
Total	205,582	100.00	6

== Opinion polling ==
Janella Marie Estrada vs. Francis Zamora
Source of poll aggregation	Dates administered	Janella Marie Estrada	Francis Zamora	Margin
RP-Mission and Development Foundation Inc. (RPMDinc)	August 1–10, 2021	30%	60%	Zamora +30
