= Raissa Laurel-Subijano =

Councilor from San Juan, Metro Manila

City Councilor of San Juan for 1st district
- Incumbent
- Assumed office June 30, 2016

Personal details
- Born: Ma. Antonia Raissa Dawn H. Laurel; April 22, 1987 (age 39)
- Party: PFP (2024–present)
- Other political affiliations: PDP–Laban (2021–2024); PMP (2016–2021)
- Education: San Sebastian College (LLB)

Ma. Antonia Raissa Dawn H. Laurel-Subijano (born April 22, 1987) is a Filipino lawyer and politician serving as a city councilor of San Juan since 2016.

== Bar exam bombing ==
Then a 23-year-old law student from San Sebastian College, Laurel-Subijano was waiting in Taft Avenue for her friends who finished the 2010 bar exam in the law school tradition of salubong when a grenade targeting members of a fraternity exploded next to her. Laurel-Subijano legs were mangled and was left in critical condition.

At the time, doctors estimated her chances of survival at only 20% and had to have both legs amputated below the knee.

== Political career ==
In 2016, Laurel-Subijano was elected as city councilor of San Juan, and re-elected again in 2019, and in 2022.

When she was in the city council, Laurel-Subijano was appointed in three committees as chairperson: Committee on Social Services, Women, Children, and Persons with Disabilities’ Welfare; Committee on Laws and Ethics; and Committee on Public Order, Safety, and Illegal Drugs. As a person with disability (PWD) herself, she pushed the rights of those disabled, and by 2017, the council approved an ordinance providing benefits and allotted funds for indigent PWDs.

== Personal life ==
After recovering from her injuries, Laurel-Subijano continued her law studies at Philippine Christian University and graduated in 2015. As a blast survivor, Laurel-Subijano has been invited to speaking engagements as a motivational speaker.

She is a distant relative of former President Jose P. Laurel.
