= Paul Artadi =

Filipino basketball player, coach, and politician

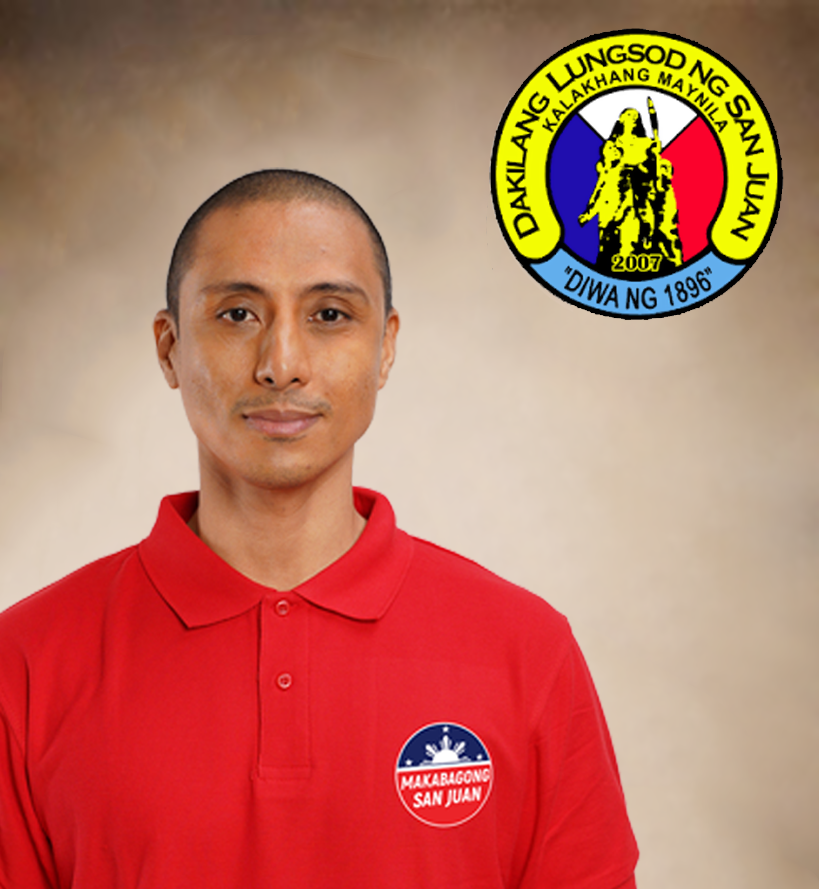
- Artadi in 2022

Member of the San Juan City Council from the 1st district
- In office June 30, 2016 – June 30, 2025

Personal details
- Born: May 5, 1981 (age 45) San Juan, Philippines
- Party: PDP (2018–present)
- Other political affiliations: Nacionalista (2015–2018)
- Basketball career

UE Red Warriors
- Position: Assistant Coach

Personal information
- Listed height: 5 ft 10 in (1.78 m)
- Listed weight: 150 lb (68 kg)

Career information
- High school: La Salle Green Hills (Mandaluyong)
- College: UE
- PBA draft: 2004: 2nd round, 11th overall pick
- Drafted by: Purefoods Tender Juicy Hotdogs
- Playing career: 2004–2015
- Coaching career: 2018–present

Career history

Playing
- 2004–2007: Purefoods Tender Juicy Hotdogs / Purefoods Chunkee Giants
- 2007–2009: Barangay Ginebra Kings
- 2009–2010: Purefoods Tender Juicy Giants / B-Meg Derby Ace Llamados
- 2010–2011: San Miguel Beermen
- 2011–2012: Air21 Express / Barako Bull Energy
- 2012–2014: Meralco Bolts
- 2014–2015: Blackwater Elite

Coaching
- 2018–present: UE (assistant)

Career highlights
- 3x PBA champion (2006 Philippine, 2008 Fiesta, 2009–10 Philippine); 3x PBA All-Star (2004, 2009, 2010); PBA All-Rookie Team (2005); PBA Obstacle Challenge champion (2009); UAAP Mythical Team (2003)

Paul Anthony Dy Artadi (born May 5, 1981) is a Filipino politician, basketball coach, and former professional player. On his eleven-year career in the Philippine Basketball Association (PBA), he played the point guard position and was a three-time PBA All-Star. In the collegiate level, he played for the University of the East (UE) and became an assistant coach for the team after retiring from the professional game. He has been serving as a city councilor of San Juan, Metro Manila since 2016.

== Early life and collegiate career ==
Artadi was born in the University of Santo Tomas Hospital in Manila but grew up in the outskirts of San Juan, Metro Manila, playing pick-up games with taller children.

He played collegiate basketball on the University of the East's Red Warriors in the UAAP, teaming up with James Yap on the back court.

== Professional career ==
Artadi was drafted by Purefoods TJ Hotdogs in the second round of the 2004 PBA draft, where he reunited with former college teammate James Yap to form the Kid Lightning-Boy Thunder backcourt. As backup point guard to Roger Yap, he managed to help Purefoods capture the championship in the 2006 PBA Philippine Cup.

During the 2007 off-season, he demanded to be released by Purefoods because he felt he was given limited playing time by the coaching staff. He finally got his wish, and was traded to the Barangay Ginebra Kings via a three-team trade. While with Ginebra, he had his best career output in the PBA while playing with the team's ace skipper Jayjay Helterbrand. He also won another championship with the Gin Kings during the 2008 PBA Fiesta Conference.

In 2009, he was traded back to his former team, the Purefoods Tender Juicy Giants. In his second stint with the squad, he helped the team win the 2009–10 PBA Philippine Cup Finals.

When coach Ryan Gregorio left Purefoods in 2010, he was traded to the San Miguel Beermen for Jonas Villanueva.

In March 2011, he was traded to Air21 Express (later renamed as Barako Bull Energy) along with Dondon Hontiveros, Dorian Peña and Danny Seigle in exchange for Nonoy Baclao, Rabeh Al-Hussaini and Rey Guevarra, top three picks of the 2010 PBA draft.

In February 2012, he was shipped to the Meralco Bolts for Chico Lanete where he was reunited with his former coach Ryan Gregorio.

After the 2013–14 PBA season ended, he was left off the "Protect 12" list by Meralco. He was eventually picked by expansion team Blackwater Elite during the 2014 PBA Expansion Draft.

== PBA career statistics ==
Legend
GP	Games played	MPG	Minutes per game
FG%	Field-goal percentage	3P%	3-point field-goal percentage	FT%	Free-throw percentage
RPG	Rebounds per game	APG	Assists per game	SPG	Steals per game
BPG	Blocks per game	PPG	Points per game	**Bold**	Career high

=== Season-by-season averages ===
Year	Team	GP	MPG	FG%	3P%	FT%	RPG	APG	SPG	BPG	PPG
2004–05	Purefoods	62	**21.0**	.447	.158	.464	2.3	**3.7**	1.2	.0	5.4
2005–06	Purefoods	48	12.9	.342	.056	.429	1.6	2.3	1.0	.0	3.0
2006–07	Purefoods	38	16.2	**.484**	.000	.636	1.9	2.7	**1.3**	.0	4.6
2007–08	Barangay Ginebra	48	16.4	.467	**.370**	.463	1.8	2.6	**1.3**	.0	6.1
2008–09	Barangay Ginebra	46	20.1	.364	.331	.658	**2.4**	2.5	1.1	.0	**7.1**
2009–10	Purefoods / B-Meg Derby Ace	**64**	18.0	.384	.277	.622	2.1	2.4	1.0	.0	6.0
2010–11	San Miguel	45	9.6	.371	.079	.450	1.3	1.6	.8	.0	3.2
2010–11	Air21	45	9.6	.371	.079	.450	1.3	1.6	.8	.0	3.2
2011–12	Barako Bull	31	14.2	.353	.234	.353	1.5	1.6	.7	.0	3.7
2011–12	Meralco	31	14.2	.353	.234	.353	1.5	1.6	.7	.0	3.7
2012–13	Meralco	22	9.9	.320	.100	**.750**	1.4	1.6	.4	.0	1.9
2013–14	Meralco	11	9.6	.438	.231	.545	1.5	1.3	.5	.0	3.4
2014–15	Blackwater	11	19.1	.388	.353	.667	1.8	2.5	.7	.0	6.5
Career		426	16.0	.402	.263	.536	1.9	2.4	1.0	.0	4.9

== Political career ==
On October 13, 2015, Artadi announced his retirement from professional basketball to shift his focus to politics. He ran as city councilor of San Juan in the 2016 local elections under the ticket of Vice Mayor Francis Zamora, who ran for mayor. He was proclaimed winner as San Juan city councilor for the 1st district. In 2019, he successfully defended his seat city council seat. He finished his third and last term in 2025. Artadi says he will focus on his business. He also insist he will not run for higher public office but does not discount a possible return as a city councilor.

== Personal life ==
Aside from being a professional basketball player, Artadi has an online business, which he named "Pimp Kicks", selling basketball shoes online through his Facebook and Instagram accounts.
