= Guia Gomez =

Filipina actress, businesswoman and politician

The Honorable Guia G. Gomez
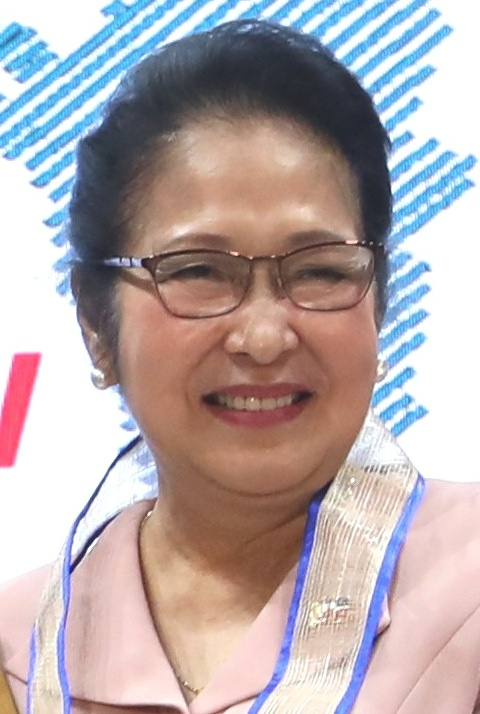
- Gomez in 2018

18th Mayor of San Juan
- In office June 30, 2010 – June 30, 2019
- Vice Mayor: Francis Zamora (2010–2016); Janella E. Estrada (2016–2019)
- Preceded by: JV Ejercito
- Succeeded by: Francis Zamora

Personal details
- Born: Guia Guanzon Gomez; April 21, 1942 (age 84) San Juan, Rizal, Philippine Commonwealth
- Party: PMP (2010–2013, 2016–2019); Partido Magdiwang (local party; 2009–2019)
- Other political affiliations: UNA (2013–2016)
- Domestic partner: Joseph Estrada (1969-1987)
- Children: JV Ejercito
- Education: Philippine Women's University
- Occupation: Entrepreneur, Actress
- Profession: Politician

Guia Guanzon Gomez (Tagalog pronunciation: [ˈgɔmɛs]; born April 21, 1942) is a Filipino actress, businesswoman and politician. She is the former mayor of San Juan, having won 75% of total votes during the 2010 elections. She is known for her previous relationship with former president Joseph Estrada, with whom she has a son, Senator JV Ejercito.

== Early life and education ==
Gomez was born in Bacolod to Silaynon Doctor Dominador Gomez and Paz Guanzon of Iloilo City. She was the valedictorian during her elementary years at the University of Negros Occidental - Recoletos (formerly Occidental Negros Institute) and completed her high school studies at the Philippine Women's College in Davao City. She graduated from the Philippine Women's University with a degree in Business Administration and a major in Accounting.

== Relationship with Joseph Estrada ==
While in college Gomez starred in several films, including Cuatro Cantos (1960), Rancho Grande (1960) and Isang Paa sa Hukay (1958). She was in the film Asiong Salonga whose lead actor was Joseph Estrada. She halted her film career to finish her college degree and pursue a career in business.

She later helped Estrada when he ran for mayor of San Juan in 1967. During his tenure as mayor she served as his first lady and their son JV Ejercito was born.

While first lady of San Juan, Gomez set up over thirty of her own businesses in real estate, food, and trading. She owns several of these companies together with her son.

== Mayor of San Juan (2010–2019) ==
=== 2010 Elections ===
In 2009, Gomez declared her intention to replace her son, JV Ejercito as mayor of San Juan. She formed her own political party, called Partido Magdiwang, of which she is president and her son is chairperson.

She later won with over 42,000 votes, approximately 75% of the total vote.

=== Awards and programs ===
During her tenure as mayor, San Juan was recognized by the Department of Interior and Local Government as the Top Highly Urbanized City in the country in terms of governance for 2011. It was the second ranked in the country in 2010. Mayor Gomez mentions that this is due to her 7K program - Kalinisan (Cleanliness), Katahimikan (Peace), Kaunlaran (Progress), Kalusugan (Health), Kalikasan (Environment), and Kalinga sa Pamilya (Family Welfare). The latter two Ks were added by her, building on the 5Ks initially started by her son.

One of her most important programs, together with architect Jun Palafox is the transformation of San Juan into a vertical green city, with "elevated sidewalks, monorail, high-rises and greenery". This is in response to the danger of floods in the city.

=== 2013 Elections ===
Gomez ran for re-election as mayor of San Juan. She won against Reynaldo San Pascual and Glenn Angeles.

=== 2016 elections ===
On September 30, 2015, she decided to run again for the mayoralty position. Gomez ran for a 3rd and final term as the city mayor against Vice Mayor Francis Zamora. She ran together with her niece of former President Joseph Estrada, Jana Ejercito for congress representative and Jinggoy Estrada's daughter, Janella for vice mayor. She narrowly won re-election against Zamora. She finished her last term as mayor on June 30, 2019.

== Other organizations ==
Gomez is the president of Balikatan sa Kaunlaran (BSK) Movement, an NGO created by the National Commission on the Role of Filipino Women (NCRFW) dedicated to "uplifting the quality of life of women and their families". It supports livelihood programs and training for female entrepreneurs including the creation of Christmas decorations and dolls.

Political offices
Preceded by JV Ejercito	Mayor of San Juan; 2010–2019	Succeeded by Francis Zamora
