= Don Allado =

Filipino basketball player and coach

The Honorable Don Allado
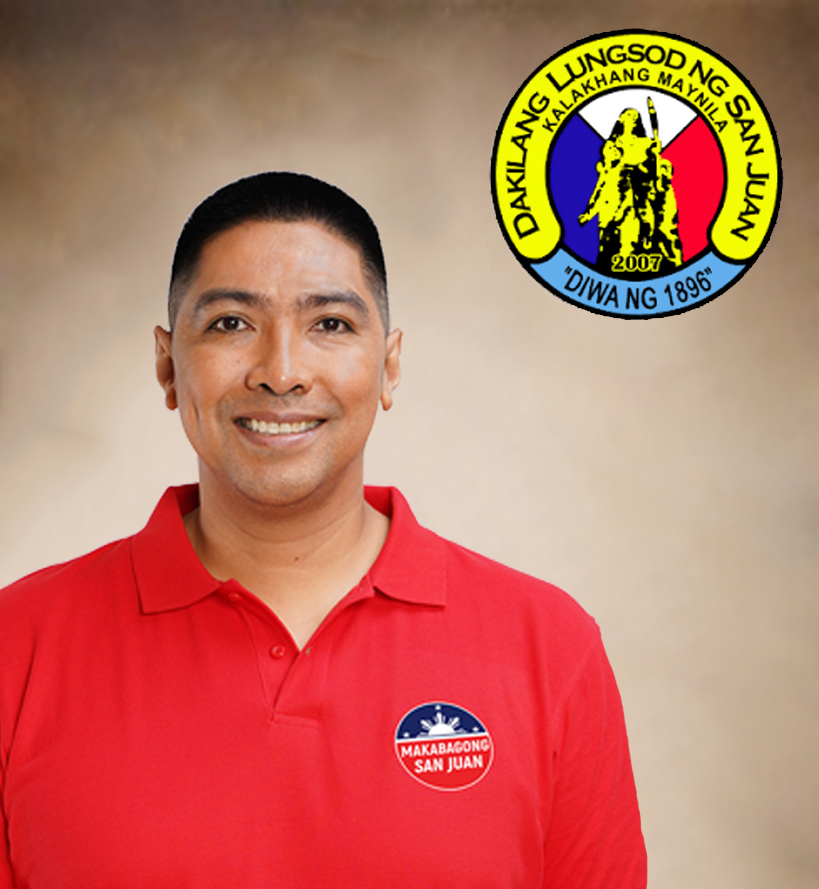
- Official portrait, 2022

Member of the San Juan City Council from the 1st district
- Incumbent
- Assumed office June 30, 2022

Personal details
- Born: June 10, 1977 (age 49) Makati, Philippines
- Party: Partido Federal ng Pilipinas (2024–present); Makabagong San Juan (local party)
- Other political affiliations: PDP–Laban (2018–2024)
- Basketball career

UE Red Warriors
- Title: Assistant coach

Personal information
- Listed height: 6 ft 6 in (1.98 m)
- Listed weight: 225 lb (102 kg)

Career information
- High school: Burbank (Burbank, California)
- College: De La Salle
- PBA draft: 1999: 1st round, 8th overall pick
- Drafted by: Alaska Aces
- Playing career: 1999–2015
- Position: Power forward
- Number: 8, 24, 41, 80
- Coaching career: 2015–present

Career history

Playing
- 1999–2006: Alaska Milkmen / Aces
- 2006–2008: Talk 'N Text Phone Pals/Tropang Texters
- 2008–2009: Air21 Express
- 2009–2011: Purefoods Tender Juicy Giants/B-Meg Llamados
- 2011–2013: Barako Bull Energy Cola
- 2013–2014: Meralco Bolts
- 2014–2015: Purefoods Star Hotshots

Coaching
- 2015–2022: Adamson (assistant)
- 2022–present: UE (assistant)

Career highlights
- 3x PBA champion (2000 All-Filipino, 2003 Invitational, 2010 Philippine); 3× PBA All-Star (2001, 2003-2004); PBA Mythical First Team (2002); PBA Mythical Second Team (2003); 2× UAAP champion (1998, 1999); 2× UAAP Most Valuable Player (1998, 1999); 3× UAAP Mythical Team (1997, 1998, 1999); 2× UAAP Finals MVP (1998, 1999); PBL Most Valuable Player (1999 1st Yakult Challenge)

Don Carlos Armand Crisostomo Allado (born June 10, 1977) is a Filipino basketball coach, former professional player, and politician.

A power forward, he played college basketball for the De La Salle Green Archers, where he won back-to-back UAAP championships, most valuable player (MVP) awards, and Finals MVP awards in 1998 and 1999. In the 1999 draft of the Philippine Basketball Association (PBA), he was selected as the eighth overall pick by Alaska with whom he won two PBA championships: the 2000 All-Filipino Cup and the 2003 Invitational Championship. In 2010, he won the PBA Philippine Cup with Purefoods. In the early 2000s, he was a three-time PBA All-Star and was named to the PBA Mythical Team. He retired in 2015 and became an assistant coach of the Adamson Falcons in the UAAP. In 2022, he was elected to the San Juan City council.

== Amateur and college career ==
He started out his amateur career playing for De La Salle University in 1996 and was known as "The King Archer". He was the Most Valuable Player in his 3rd year after the elimination rounds in the 1998–1999 season (Season 61) as well as the Finals MVP after he helped the Green Archers defeat Far Eastern University in the UAAP season 61 finals. This was the first of La Salle's four championships (four-peat). He did it again the next season and captured the season MVP and Finals MVP awards for the 1999–2000 season after defeating the UST Growling Tigers in overtime of the UAAP season 62 finals. He was a part of the mythical five teams since his sophomore year until his 4th year.

He also played in the Philippine Basketball League under Wilkins Distilled Water in 1998 for one conference until it disbanded. Welcoat Paints immediately picked up the talented power forward and won the first ever championship in franchise history. He was also named season MVP and Finals MVP for the 1999–2000 season. He was also named into the mythical team for 2 years in a row.

== Professional career ==
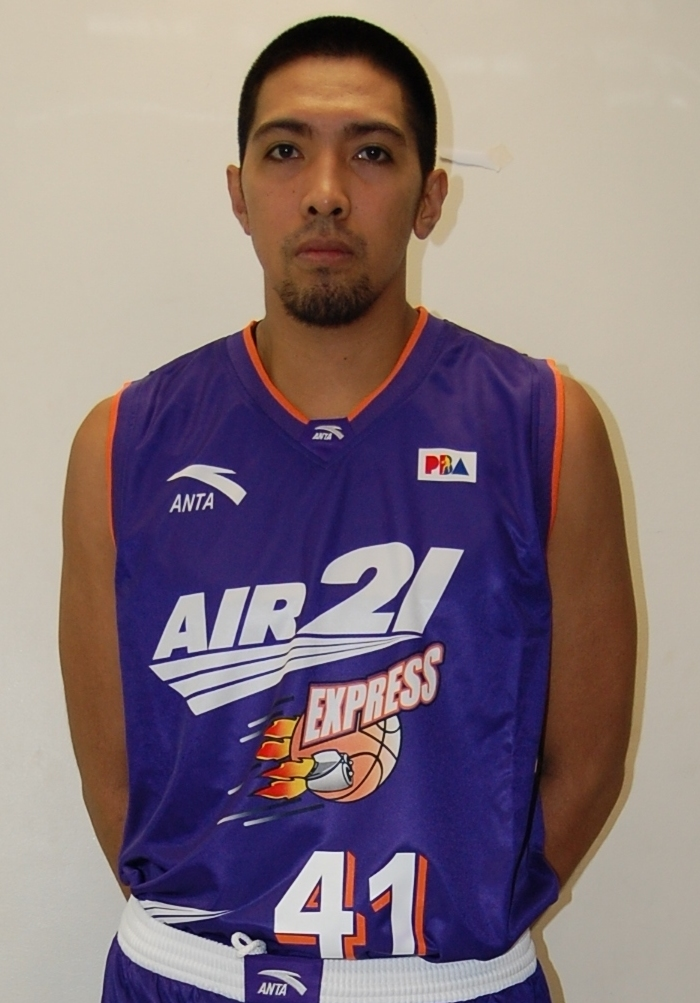
Allado with Air21 in 2008

He was the 8th overall pick in the 1999 PBA draft. After playing seven solid years with Alaska, in December 2006, he was shipped to the Talk 'N Text Phone Pals for Willie Miller and John Ferriols. Allado was again traded by the Talk 'N Text Tropang Texters for Ranidel de Ocampo to the Air21 Express. He wasn't satisfied with the situation he was in so after one season with Air21, he requested to be sent immediately to the Purefoods Tender Juicy Giants/B-Meg Llamados.

Before the start of the 37th Season, he was involved in a three-team trade which saw him being dealt to Barako Bull along with a future second round pick. He was a part of Barako Bull's ragtag veterans Danny Seigle, Mick Pennisi, and Dorian Peña. In June 2013, he was acquired by Meralco Bolts via a three-team, five-player trade. With this trade, he reunited with his former coach at Purefoods in Ryan Gregorio, who gave him the task to add veteran presence to the team and be a mentor to younger teammates.

Allado announced his retirement after 16 years of playing in the PBA on November 25, 2015.

== Personal life ==
Allado is married to GMA-7 actress Maricar de Mesa. They initially dated for four years before they finally tied the knot and got married on December 1, 2006, at Our Lady of Consolation Parish in Tandang Sora, Quezon City. They never had any children. Early in 2014, he and de Mesa already got separated, due to a third-party affair. He already filed for the annulment of their marriage.

== Controversy ==
Allado was suspended for one conference by the PBA and ordered to pay P500,000 as fine for ranting on Twitter against the league. This happened after they were eliminated from playoff contention by Powerade in the 2012 PBA Governors Cup. His tweets were controversial, as it accused the league of fixing games. He tweeted, "I can accept losing to teams. But I can't accept losing bcoz of referees. I'm the guy that says what others can't.#PBA games are fixed. They control who is in & who is out. It's a disgrace to be in this league. I am bitter about losing. Not to Powerade, but to #PBA . In my opinion, this league has little credibility left."

His remarks became a trending topic on Twitter and sparked mixed reactions among netizens. PBA Commissioner Chito Salud made a strong rebuke on Allado's tweet, saying, "these accusations that games are fixed, that we control who goes into the semis/finals/eventual champion are baseless and unfounded it came from someone who has lost his mind and a sore loser".

He immediately deleted his comment and made a public apology on Twitter, saying "It was an error in judgement on my part to let my passion for this game get the best of me. As a professional I should've known better. I understand my statement may be construed by many as discrediting the PBA. Let it be known, however, that such is not my intention. Again, my sincerest apologies to the Comm Salud, Board of Governors & entire PBA.".

Despite his public apology, he was still summoned by Commissioner Salud, who ordered his suspension and fine.

== PBA career statistics ==
Legend
GP	Games played	MPG	Minutes per game
FG%	Field-goal percentage	3P%	3-point field-goal percentage	FT%	Free-throw percentage
RPG	Rebounds per game	APG	Assists per game	SPG	Steals per game
BPG	Blocks per game	PPG	Points per game	**Bold**	Career high

=== Season-by-season averages ===
Year	Team	GP	MPG	FG%	3P%	FT%	RPG	APG	SPG	BPG	PPG
1999	Alaska	16	25.5	.483	—	.742	4.3	1.1	.2	.4	6.8
2000	Alaska	47	21.5	.452	.000	.630	4.6	1.0	.2	.3	5.5
2001	Alaska	42	31.8	.464	.000	.694	7.1	1.7	.2	.4	8.3
2002	Alaska	56	26.8	.425	.167	.737	5.9	**1.8**	.3	.3	7.4
2003	Alaska	55	**33.9**	.447	.000	.628	**8.3**	1.7	.2	.4	**11.2**
2004–05	Alaska	**63**	31.7	.410	.167	.604	7.0	1.7	.3	.6	9.8
2005–06	Alaska	20	29.6	.441	—	.617	7.8	1.7	**.6**	.5	9.7
2005–06	Talk 'N Text	19	27.7	.476	.333	.557	8.0	1.7	.3	.4	10.3
2006–07	Talk 'N Text	48	25.5	**.514**	.286	.750	5.6	1.2	.3	.3	9.7
2007–08	Talk 'N Text	38	22.0	.491	.328	.698	5.7	1.1	.3	.5	8.8
2008–09	Talk 'N Text	31	23.8	.422	.236	.682	6.1	1.2	.5	**.7**	6.4
2008–09	Air21	31	23.8	.422	.236	.682	6.1	1.2	.5	**.7**	6.4
2008–09	Purefoods	31	23.8	.422	.236	.682	6.1	1.2	.5	**.7**	6.4
2009–10	Purefoods / B-Meg Derby Ace	**63**	16.7	.474	**.375**	.750	3.6	.5	.1	.2	4.5
2010–11	B-Meg Derby Ace	37	16.8	.494	.000	.690	4.3	.7	.1	.4	4.9
2011–12	Barako Bull	42	21.5	.474	.154	.755	4.9	1.1	.2	.4	8.0
2012–13	Barako Bull	15	9.2	.333	.000	**.833**	1.5	.3	.1	.1	1.9
2013–14	Meralco	9	9.0	.391	—	.625	2.7	.2	.0	.2	2.6
2014–15	Purefoods / Star	11	5.5	.133	.000	.500	1.0	.2	.0	.0	.5
Career		612	24.3	.453	.259	.676	5.6	1.2	.2	.4	7.5
