= Cris Mathay =

Filipino politician

The Honorable Cris Mathay

Member of the San Juan City Council from the 2nd district
- In office June 30, 2013 – June 30, 2022

Personal details
- Party: Pwersa ng Masang Pilipino
- Other political affiliations: United Nationalist Alliance
- Occupation: Politician

Michael Cristopher "Cris" Reyes Mathay is a Filipino politician who previously served as city councilor in the City of San Juan, Philippines.

== Career ==
Cris comes from a political lineage, with his grandfather Mel Mathay an Assemblyman, Vice Governor of Metro Manila, and then Quezon City's Mayor, and his father Chuck Mathay as Congressman of Quezon City. Nevertheless, he carved his own mark running in San Juan in the 2013 elections as councilor, where he finished the highest in Greenhills and Addition Hills, and finishing #2 overall in his district in San Juan.

His grandmother Sonya Mathay was the first barangay captain of Barangay Greenhills in the late 1970s, and Greenhills has since been Cris' and his own family's home.

He paid his dues as he worked his way up. Cris started as a Board Member of North Greenhills which is home to some of the Philippines' biggest politicians and businessmen including former Philippine President Joseph Estrada and Senator Franklin Drilon. He then became the President of this prestigious Homeowners Association.

In 2009, he ran and won as the barangay captain of Greenhills. In 2013, he became one of San Juan's youngest city councilors.

== Personal life ==
An alumnus of Xavier School San Juan, he pursued further studies in the University of Nebraska. Cris attained his degree in BS-Export Economics from the De La Salle–College of Saint Benilde in 2004. He is married to Rikki Mathay and they have two daughters, Cristah and Mischka. They are active volunteers of the Philippine Red Cross.
