= Francis Zamora =

Filipino basketball player and politician

The Honorable Francis Zamora
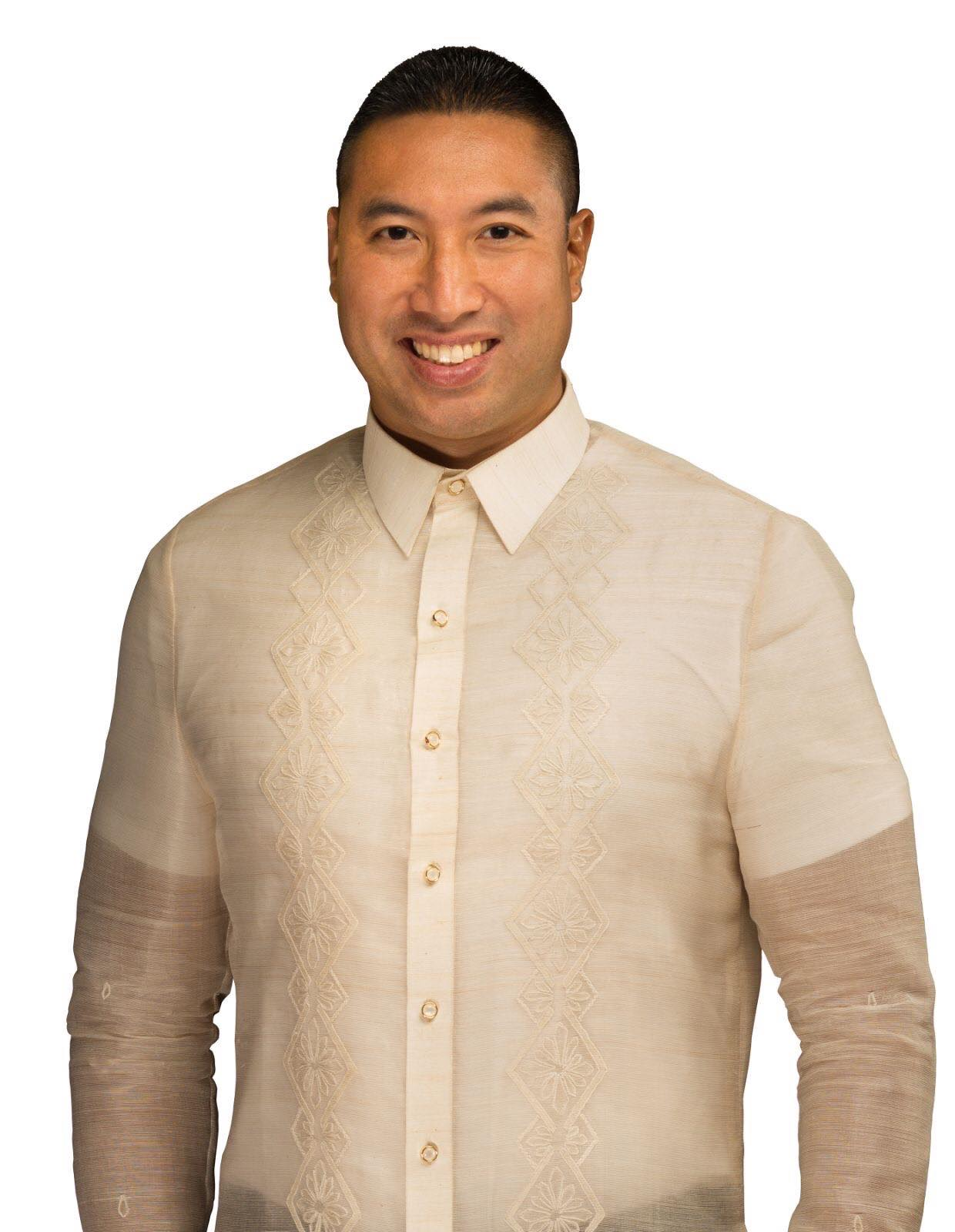

19th Mayor of San Juan
- Incumbent
- Assumed office June 30, 2019
- Vice Mayor: Warren Villa (2019–2023); Angelo Agcaoili (2023–present)
- Preceded by: Guia Gomez

National President of the League of Cities of the Philippines
- Incumbent
- Assumed office August 8, 2025
- Preceded by: Mike Rama

Chairman of the Metro Manila Council
- Incumbent
- Assumed office November 26, 2022
- Preceded by: Edwin Olivarez

Vice Mayor of San Juan
- In office June 30, 2010 – June 30, 2016
- Mayor: Guia Gomez
- Preceded by: Boy Celles
- Succeeded by: Janella Estrada

Member of the San Juan City Council from the 2nd district
- In office June 30, 2007 – June 30, 2010

Personal details
- Born: Francisco Javier Manlapit Zamora; December 5, 1977 (age 48) San Juan, Metro Manila, Philippines
- Party: PFP (2024–present); Partido Magdiwang (local party; 2009–present)
- Other political affiliations: PDP (2018–2024); Nacionalista (2015–2018); UNA (2012–2015); PMP (2007–2012)
- Spouse: Keri Neri (m. 2001)
- Relations: Pammy Zamora (half-sister); Bel Zamora (half-sister)
- Children: 4
- Parent: Ronaldo Zamora (father)
- Education: De La Salle University (AB); University of the Philippines Diliman (MPA)
- Occupation: Politician, basketball player
- Website: franciszamora.com
- Basketball career

Personal information
- Listed height: 6 ft 5 in (1.96 m)

Career information
- High school: La Salle Green Hills (Mandaluyong)
- College: De La Salle
- PBA draft: 2001: 4th round, 35th overall pick
- Drafted by: Sta. Lucia Realtors
- Playing career: 1999–2002
- Position: Center
- Number: 16

Career history
- 1999: Blu Detergent
- 1999–2000: Welcoat Paints
- 2001: Montaña Jewels
- 2001–2002: ICTSI-La Salle

Career highlights
- UAAP champion (1998, 1999); PBL champion (1999 Yakult-Challenge Cup, 1999-2000 2nd Yakult Challenge Cup)

Francisco Javier "Francis" Manlapit Zamora (born December 5, 1977) is a Filipino politician, businessman, and former basketball player serving as the mayor of San Juan, Metro Manila since 2019. He is also concurrently the president of the Metro Manila Council since 2022 and the national president of the League of Cities of the Philippines since 2025. He previously was San Juan's vice mayor from 2010 to 2016, and a council member from 2007 to 2010.

== Basketball career ==
Zamora, standing at 6'5", played as center, initially playing for La Salle Green Hills. He later became as the team captain of the De La Salle Green Archers who won two championships of UAAP Men's Basketball in 1998 and 1999 under then-head coach and fellow future politician Franz Pumaren. He graduated with a Bachelor of Arts degree in psychology in 1999.

After his college career, he played in major leagues, including the Philippine Basketball League for the teams Welcoat Paintmasters (where he won two championships in 1999 and 2000) and Blu Detergent. Zamora was the 35th overall draft pick by the Sta. Lucia Realtors in the 2001 PBA draft. However, he never played in the PBA after being sidelined for a proposed trade that would not materialize. He would then later return to PBL, playing for Montaña Jewels and ICTSI-La Salle. He retired from basketball in 2002.

As a public servant, Zamora played in the UNTV Cup. He played for the Congress-LGU Legislators on UNTV Cup Season 1 in 2013, for the LGU Vanguards on Season 2 in 2014, and for the HOR Solons on Season 4.

== Political career ==
Zamora took up a business and entrepreneurship program at the New York University in 2003. He received a master's degree in Public Administration from the National College of Public Administration and Governance at the University of the Philippines Diliman in 2006, and completed a short course in business and entrepreneurship at New York University. In 2007, Zamora started his career in politics as a councilor from the 2nd district of San Juan. He is also a member of the JCI San Juan group. Three years later, he was elected vice mayor. In 2015, he finished an Executive Education Program at the John F. Kennedy School of Government in Harvard University.

After two consecutive terms as vice mayor, Zamora ran for the mayoralty post in the 2016 elections. He faced the incumbent mayor Guia Gomez, promising to stop the dynasty of the Ejercito-Estradas, who, in his words, had run the city's politics for 47 years. However, he narrowly lost the said election to Gomez.

In 2019, Zamora ran once again for the mayoralty post under the Partido Demokratiko Pilipino-Lakas ng Bayan (PDP–Laban) against incumbent vice mayor Janella Ejercito, the daughter of former mayor and senator Jinggoy Estrada who was endorsed by the administration-backed Hugpong ng Pagbabago her grandfather, former President Joseph Estrada, and the outgoing mayor Guia Gomez. In the election, Zamora defeated Estrada by a margin of 10,247 votes, ending control of the Ejercito-Estrada clan of the city after 50 years.

Zamora was reelected to a second consecutive term as mayor in 2022. On November 26, 2022, he was elected president of the Metro Manila Council (MMC) and co-chairperson of the Regional Development Council. During his term, San Juan received its Seal of Good Local Governance in 2023. He was reelected to his third consecutive term as mayor in 2025 and his second term as MMC president in the same year. On August 8, 2025, he became the national president of League of Cities of the Philippines.

== Personal life ==
Zamora is the son and youngest child of Ronaldo Zamora, a long-time congressman in San Juan who served the city for almost two decades, with his wife Rosemarie "Mimi" Manlapit. He had an older sister named Consuelo Maria Zamora (1970–2008). His half-sisters Ysabel Maria ("Bel") and Amparo Maria ("Pammy") also entered politics, having served as congresswomen from San Juan's lone district and Taguig's 2nd district, respectively.

He married Keri Neri in 2001 and has four children. His daughter, Amanda, is a model who competed as a housemate in the "Connect" season of Pinoy Big Brother in 2021, where she was eliminated in the last eviction alongside Ralph Malibunas. His son, Rocco, serves as the Special Assistant to the Mayor during his term.

Since 2014, Zamora is the owner of a Goldilocks Bakeshop franchise branch at Greenhills Shopping Center.

Political offices
Preceded by Boy Celles	Vice Mayor of San Juan; 2010–2016	Succeeded by Janella Estrada
Preceded by Guia Gomez	Mayor of San Juan; 2019–present	Incumbent
