= Timeline of the Premier Volleyball League =

Organizational history of the Premier Volleyball League

The Premier Volleyball League (PVL) was established in 2017 as a rebranding of the former Shakey's V-League (SVL). As of 2026, the PVL is composed of nine active member teams.

== Before the PVL ==
The last conference of the Shakey's V-League was the 2016 Shakey's V-League Reinforced Open Conference. Eight teams competed in that conference.

Meanwhile the last conference of the first run of Spikers' Turf was the 2016 Spikers' Turf Reinforced Conference. Six teams competed in that conference.

Last conference in SVL; did not join PVL †	Collegiate team ‡

Shakey's V-League	Spikers' Turf
BaliPure Purest Water Defenders	100 Plus Active Spikers
Bureau of Customs Transformers †	Champion Supra
Laoag Power Smashers	Cignal HD Spikers
Philippine Air Force Jet Spikers	IEM Volley Masters
Philippine Coast Guard Lady Dolphins †	Philippine Air Force Air Spikers
Pocari Sweat Lady Warriors	Philippine Army Troopers
UP Lady Fighting Maroons ‡
UST Golden Tigresses ‡

== 2017–2019: Early years ==
=== 2017 Reinforced Conference ===
In the Reinforced Conference, six teams made up the women's division. The BaliPure Purest Water Defenders, Philippine Air Force Jet Spikers, Pocari Sweat Lady Warriors, and the Power Smashers returned from the former Shakey's V-League. Meanwhile, the Creamline Cool Smashers and Perlas Spikers joined as expansion teams.

The men's division was also made up of six teams, all coming from Spikers' Turf. These teams were the Cafe Lupe Sunrisers (formerly 100 Plus Active Spikers), Cignal HD Spikers, IEM Volley Masters, Philippine Air Force Air Spikers, Philippine Army Troopers, and Sta. Elena Wrecking Balls (formerly Champion Supra).

First conference in PVL *

2017 PVL Reinforced Conference teams
Women's division	Men's division
BaliPure Purest Water Defenders	Cafe Lupe Sunrisers
Creamline Cool Smashers *	Cignal HD Spikers
Perlas Spikers *	IEM Volley Masters
Philippine Air Force Jet Spikers	Philippine Air Force Air Spikers
Pocari Sweat Lady Warriors	Philippine Army Troopers
Power Smashers	Sta. Elena Wrecking Balls

=== 2017 Open Conference ===
In the Open Conference, two teams were added to each division. The women's division saw the addition of the Adamson–Akari Lady Falcons and UP Lady Fighting Maroons, while the Philippine Air Force Jet Spikers were renamed as the Hair Fairy Air Force Jet Spikers. On the other hand, the men's division added the Gamboa Coffee Spikers and Megabuilders Volley Bolts.

First conference in PVL *	Collegiate team ‡	
Last conference in PVL †	Last conference before hiatus / rejoined in ST §	Only season in PVL *†

2017 PVL Open Conference teams
Women's division	Men's division
Adamson–Akari Lady Falcons ‡	Cafe Lupe Sunrisers §
BaliPure Purest Water Defenders	Cignal HD Spikers
Creamline Cool Smashers	Gamboa Coffee Spikers *†
Hair Fairy Air Force Jet Spikers §	IEM Volley Masters
Perlas Spikers	Megabuilders Volley Bolts *†
Pocari Sweat Lady Warriors	Philippine Air Force Air Spikers
Power Smashers †	Philippine Army Troopers
UP Lady Fighting Maroons ‡	Sta. Elena Wrecking Balls §

=== 2018 Reinforced Conference ===
The women's division remained at eight teams. Three teams made their debut: the Iriga City–Navy Oragons. Petro Gazz Angels, and Tacloban Fighting Warays. PLDT's women's volleyball team also returned as the PayMaya High Flyers after last competing in the SVL. Adamson–Akari, Philippine Air Force, Power Smashers, and UP departed. BaliPure became the BaliPure–NU Water Defenders while the Perlas Spikers became the BanKo Perlas Spikers. Air Force, while departed, instead partnered with Pocari Sweat, thus becoming the Pocari Sweat–Air Force Lady Warriors.

The men's division saw one expansion team, that being the Vice Co. Blockbusters. PLDT's men's volleyball team also returned from the SVL as the PLDT Home Fibr Power Hitters. However, both Gamboa and Megabuilders leave after just one conference alongside Cafe Lupe and Sta. Elena.

This was also the last PVL conference for all men's division teams, as they would be put back into the relaunched Spikers' Turf beginning with the 2018 Open Conference (the men's division would continue to be held for the 2018 Collegiate Conference before it was discontinued).

First conference in PVL *	Team joined from SVL ^	Team joined from SVL; last conference in PVL ^†
Last conference before hiatus §	Only season in PVL; did not join ST *†	

2018 PVL Reinforced Conference teams
Women's division	Men's division
BaliPure–NU Water Defenders §	Cignal HD Spikers
BanKo Perlas Spikers	IEM Volley Masters
Creamline Cool Smashers	PLDT Home Fibr Power Hitters ^
Iriga City–Navy Oragons *	Philippine Air Force Air Spikers
PayMaya High Flyers ^†	Philippine Army Troopers
Petro Gazz Angels *	Vice Co. Blockbusters *†
Pocari Sweat–Air Force Lady Warriors
Tacloban Fighting Warays *

=== 2018 Open Conference ===
The Ateneo–Motolite Lady Eagles made their debut while Adamson–Akari returned. PayMaya left after one conference while BaliPure took a leave of absence for this conference.

Collegiate team ‡	Last conference in PVL †

2018 PVL Open Conference teams
Adamson–Akari Lady Falcons ‡	Iriga City–Navy Oragons †
Ateneo–Motolite Lady Eagles ‡	Petro Gazz Angels
BanKo Perlas Spikers	Pocari Sweat–Air Force Lady Warriors †
Creamline Cool Smashers	Tacloban Fighting Warays †

=== 2019 Reinforced Conference ===
The league added the Philippine Army Lady Troopers (competing as the PacificTown–Army Lady Troopers) to its lineup while the BaliPure made their return. Additionally, Motolite established the Motolite Power Builders, building from the previous Ateneo–Motolite team. However, following the departures of Adamson–Akari, Iriga–Navy, and Tacloban. Pocari Sweat–Air Force also departed with neither unit returning for this conference.

First conference in PVL *	Rejoined PVL **

2019 PVL Reinforced Conference teams
BaliPure Purest Water Defenders **
BanKo Perlas Spikers
Creamline Cool Smashers
Motolite Power Builders *
PacificTown–Army Lady Troopers *
Petro Gazz Angels

=== 2019 Open Conference ===
The league expanded to nine teams following the additions of the Chef's Classics Lady Red Spikers and Choco Mucho Flying Titans, as well as the Philippine Air Force Lady Jet Spikers, who return as a single unit after partnering with Pocari Sweat prior.

First conference in PVL *	Rejoined; last conference in PVL **†
Last conference in PVL †	Only season in PVL *†

2019 PVL Open Conference teams
BaliPure Purest Water Defenders	Motolite Power Builders †
BanKo Perlas Spikers	PacificTown–Army Lady Troopers
Chef's Classics Lady Red Spikers *†	Petro Gazz Angels
Choco Mucho Flying Titans *	Philippine Air Force Lady Jet Spikers **†
Creamline Cool Smashers

== 2021–2023: Turning pro and PSL teams join ==
=== 2021 Open Conference ===
For the 2021 Open Conference, the league saw major changes as five teams from the now-inactive Philippine Super Liga transferred to the PVL. Four of them made their PVL debut this conference, including the Chery Tiggo Crossovers, Cignal HD Spikers, PLDT Home Fibr Power Hitters, and Sta. Lucia Lady Realtors. A fifth PSL team, the F2 Logistics Cargo Movers, opted out. On top of the five PSL teams, there was initially going to be a sixth expansion team, the UAC Power Hitters, however the team took a leave of absence. As of 2026, UAC has yet to compete.

Six out of the nine teams from the previous conference returned, with Chef's Classics, Motolite, and Philippine Air Force departing from the league. This now puts the league at ten teams. Two teams changed their name: BanKo Perlas Spikers reverted back to Perlas Spikers while the Philippine Army Lady Troopers became the Black Mamba Army Lady Troopers.

Team joined from PSL ^	Team joined from PSL; last conference in PVL ^†	Last conference in PVL †

2021 PVL Open Conference teams
BaliPure Purest Water Defenders	Creamline Cool Smashers
Black Mamba Army Lady Troopers	Perlas Spikers †
Cignal HD Spikers ^	Petro Gazz Angels
Chery Tiggo Crossovers ^	PLDT Home Fibr Power Hitters ^
Choco Mucho Flying Titans	Sta. Lucia Lady Realtors ^†

=== 2022 Open Conference ===
The fifth team coming from the PSL, the F2 Logistics Cargo Movers, made their debut in this conference. On the other hand, two teams departed: the Perlas Spikers and Sta. Lucia Lady Realtors, bringing the league back to nine teams. Another two teams changed their name. Chery Tiggo became the Chery Tiggo 7 Pro Crossovers while PLDT became the PLDT High Speed Hitters.

Team joined from PSL; last conference before hiatus ^§	Last conference in PVL †

2022 PVL Open Conference teams
Army Black Mamba Lady Troopers	Creamline Cool Smashers
BaliPure Purest Water Defenders †	F2 Logistics Cargo Movers ^§
Chery Tiggo 7 Pro Crossovers	Petro Gazz Angels
Choco Mucho Flying Titans	PLDT High Speed Hitters
Cignal HD Spikers

=== 2022 Invitational Conference ===
In the Invitational Conference, BaliPure and F2 Logistics opted out of competing. As of 2026, BaliPure has yet to make a return to the league.

2022 PVL Invitational Conference teams
Army Black Mamba Lady Troopers
Chery Tiggo 7 Pro Crossovers
Choco Mucho Flying Titans
Cignal HD Spikers
Creamline Cool Smashers
Petro Gazz Angels
PLDT High Speed Hitters

=== 2022 Reinforced Conference ===
The only notable change in the Reinforced Conference was the addition of the Akari Chargers in place of the BaliPure Purest Water Defenders. The Philippine Army Lady Troopers were known as the United Auctioneers Army Lady Troopers for this conference while Chery Tiggo simplified its name back to Chery Tiggo Crossovers.

First conference in PVL *	Rejoined PVL **

2022 PVL Reinforced Conference teams
Akari Chargers *	F2 Logistics Cargo Movers **
Chery Tiggo Crossovers	Petro Gazz Angels
Choco Mucho Flying Titans	PLDT High Speed Hitters
Cignal HD Spikers	United Auctioneers Army Lady Troopers
Creamline Cool Smashers

=== 2023 First All-Filipino Conference ===
The First All-Filipino Conference saw no new teams nor departing teams, but the Philippine Army Lady Troopers went back to Army Black Mamba Lady Troopers.

Last conference in PVL †

2023 PVL First All-Filipino Conference teams
Akari Chargers	Creamline Cool Smashers
Army Black Mamba Lady Troopers †	F2 Logistics Cargo Movers
Chery Tiggo Crossovers	Petro Gazz Angels
Choco Mucho Flying Titans	PLDT High Speed Hitters
Cignal HD Spikers

=== 2023 Invitational Conference ===
The Invitational Conference saw eleven PVL teams aside from the two guest teams. Two expansion teams joined in with the Farm Fresh Foxies and Quezon City Gerflor Defenders. The Foton Tornadoes then became the sixth PSL team to make its way to the PVL. Meanwhile the Philippine Army Lady Troopers left, bringing the league to eleven teams.

First conference in PVL *	Team joined from PSL; last conference in PVL ^†

2023 PVL Invitational Conference teams
Akari Chargers	Farm Fresh Foxies *
Chery Tiggo Crossovers	Foton Tornadoes ^
Choco Mucho Flying Titans	Petro Gazz Angels
Cignal HD Spikers	PLDT High Speed Hitters
Creamline Cool Smashers	Quezon City Gerflor Defenders *
F2 Logistics Cargo Movers

=== 2023 Second All-Filipino Conference ===
The league reached twelve teams following the additions of the Galeries Tower Highrisers and Nxled Chameleons. The Foton Tornadoes left after one conference.

First conference in PVL *	Last conference in PVL †

2023 PVL Second All-Filipino Conference teams
Akari Chargers	Farm Fresh Foxies
Chery Tiggo Crossovers	Galeries Tower Highrisers *
Choco Mucho Flying Titans	Nxled Chameleons *
Cignal HD Spikers	Petro Gazz Angels
Creamline Cool Smashers	PLDT High Speed Hitters
F2 Logistics Cargo Movers †	Quezon City Gerflor Defenders †

== 2024–present: Stabilization and contraction ==
=== 2024 All-Filipino Conference ===
Strong Group Athletics took over the Quezon City Gerflor Defenders franchise, creating the eponymous Strong Group Athletics team. The F2 Logistics Cargo Movers left and were replaced by the Capital1 Solar Spikers.

First conference in PVL *

2024 PVL All-Filipino Conference teams
Akari Chargers	Farm Fresh Foxies
Capital1 Solar Spikers *	Galeries Tower Highrisers
Chery Tiggo Crossovers	Nxled Chameleons
Choco Mucho Flying Titans	Petro Gazz Angels
Cignal HD Spikers	PLDT High Speed Hitters
Creamline Cool Smashers	Strong Group Athletics *

=== 2024 Reinforced Conference ===
Strong Group Athletics were renamed to the Zus Coffee Thunderbelles.

Premier Volleyball League teams 2024 Reinforced Conference to 2025 Invitational Conference
Akari Chargers	Farm Fresh Foxies
Capital1 Solar Spikers	Galeries Tower Highrisers
Chery Tiggo Crossovers	Nxled Chameleons
Choco Mucho Flying Titans	Petro Gazz Angels
Cignal HD Spikers	PLDT High Speed Hitters
Creamline Cool Smashers	Zus Coffee Thunderbelles

=== 2025 Reinforced Conference ===
The Chery Tiggo Crossovers and Cignal HD Spikers were renamed to the Chery Tiggo EV Crossovers and Cignal Super Spikers, respectively.

Last conference in PVL †

2025 PVL Reinforced Conference teams
Akari Chargers	Farm Fresh Foxies
Capital1 Solar Spikers	Galeries Tower Highrisers
Chery Tiggo EV Crossovers †	Nxled Chameleons
Choco Mucho Flying Titans	Petro Gazz Angels †
Cignal Super Spikers	PLDT High Speed Hitters
Creamline Cool Smashers	Zus Coffee Thunderbelles

=== 2026 All-Filipino Conference ===
The Chery Tiggo EV Crossovers disbanded while the Petro Gazz Angels took a leave of absence.

Last conference in PVL †

2026 PVL All-Filipino Conference teams
Akari Chargers	Farm Fresh Foxies
Capital1 Solar Spikers	Galeries Tower Highrisers
Choco Mucho Flying Titans	Nxled Chameleons
Cignal Super Spikers †	PLDT High Speed Hitters
Creamline Cool Smashers	Zus Coffee Thunderbelles

=== 2026–27 All-Filipino Conference ===
The Cignal Super Spikers took a leave of absence.

2026–27 PVL All-Filipino Conference teams
Akari Chargers	Galeries Tower Highrisers
Capital1 Solar Spikers	Nxled Chameleons
Choco Mucho Flying Titans	PLDT High Speed Hitters
Creamline Cool Smashers	Zus Coffee Thunderbelles
Farm Fresh Foxies
