= 2017 Premier Volleyball League Open Conference – Men's division =

Second men's tournament of the 2017 PVL season

2017 Premier Volleyball League Open Conference
- Duration: July 1 – August 16, 2017
- Teams: 8
- TV partner(s): ABS-CBN Sports and Action

Results
- Champions: Cignal HD Spikers
- Runners-up: Megabuilders Volley Bolts
- Third place: Philippine Air Force Air Spikers
- Fourth place: Sta. Elena Wrecking Balls

Awards
- Conference MVP: Lorenzo Capate Jr.
- Finals MVP: Lorenzo Capate Jr.
- Best OH: Edwin Tolentino; Isaah Arda
- Best MB: Kim Malabunga; Francis Saura
- Best OPP: Berlin Panglinawan
- Best Setter: Vincent Mangulabnan
- Best Libero: Sandy Domenick Montero

PVL Open Conference chronology
- < 2016 (ST) 2018 (ST) >

PVL conference chronology
- < 2017 Reinforced 2017 Collegiate >

The men's division of the 2017 Premier Volleyball League Open Conference was the second conference of the 2017 Premier Volleyball League men's division season. The conference started on July 1, 2017 at the Filoil Flying V Centre, San Juan. The tournament will have two new teams, Megabuilders and Gamboa Coffee.

== Teams ==
Premier Volleyball League 1st Season Open Conference (Men's Division)
| Abbr. | Team | Company | Head coach | Team captain |
|---|---|---|---|---|
| CIG | Cignal HD Spikers | Cignal TV, Inc. | Oliver Almadro | Ysay Marasigan |
| CLS | Cafe Lupe Sunrisers | Cafe Lupe Hostel & Restaurant | Rodrigo Palmero | Ralph Ocampo |
| GCM | Gamboa Coffee Spikers | Universal Knowledge DermPharma, Inc. | Mario Mia | Sam Damian |
| IEM | IEM Volley Masters | Instituto Estetico Manila | Renz Ordoñez | Eden Canlas |
| MEG | Megabuilders Volley Bolts | One Mega Builders Construction Corporation | Dante Alinsunurin | Francis Saura |
| PAF | Philippine Air Force Air Spikers | Philippine Air Force | Rhovyl Verayo | Jessie Lopez |
| PAR | Philippine Army Troopers | Philippine Army | Rico de Guzman | Benjaylo Labide |
| STE | Sta. Elena Wrecking Balls | Sta. Elena Construction and Development Corporation | Arnold Laniog | Jan Berlin Paglinawan |

== Format ==
Preliminary round

The eight teams compete in a single round-robin tournament, with each team playing one match against all other teams for a total of seven matches. The top four teams will advance to the semifinals while the bottom four will be eliminated and ranked 5th through 8th in the final standings.

Semifinals

The top four teams from the preliminary round compete in the semifinals. Teams compete in best-of-three series with the winners advancing to the finals while the losers will compete in the third place series. The match-ups for the semifinals are as follows:

- SF1: PR #1 vs. PR #4
- SF2: PR #2 vs. PR #3

Third place series

The losing teams from the semifinals compete in a best-of-three series to determine which team will finish third in this conference. If the series is tied at 1–1 when the championship is decided, the pool standing procedure will be used (starting from set ratio).

Finals

The winning teams from the semifinals compete in a best-of-three series to determine the conference champions. The losing team in this round will be declared conference runners-up.

== Pool standing procedure ==
Teams are initially ranked by wins followed by match points. A win awards three points if the match lasted for three or four sets (3–0 or 3–1), or two points if the match lasted for five sets (3–2). A loss only awards one point if the match lasted for five sets (2–3).

If multiple teams tie for wins and match points, the next criteria are set ratio (the number of sets won divided by number of sets lost across all matches) and point ratio (the number of points won divided by number of points lost across all matches). If any teams are still tied, the procedure will be applied again, but only considering matches between the remaining tied teams.

== Preliminary round ==
| Pos | Team | Pld | W | L | Pts | SW | SL | SR | SPW | SPL | SPR | Qualification |
|---|---|---|---|---|---|---|---|---|---|---|---|---|
| 1 | Cignal HD Spikers | 7 | 6 | 1 | 18 | 18 | 4 | 4.500 | 536 | 441 | 1.215 | Semifinals |
| 2 | Megabuilders Volley Bolts | 7 | 6 | 1 | 18 | 20 | 5 | 4.000 | 593 | 504 | 1.177 | Semifinals |
| 3 | Philippine Air Force Air Spikers | 7 | 5 | 2 | 13 | 17 | 13 | 1.308 | 672 | 624 | 1.077 | Semifinals |
| 4 | Sta. Elena Wrecking Balls | 7 | 4 | 3 | 13 | 15 | 11 | 1.364 | 588 | 568 | 1.035 | Fourth-seed playoff |
| 5 | Philippine Army Troopers | 7 | 4 | 3 | 11 | 15 | 13 | 1.154 | 618 | 607 | 1.018 | Fourth-seed playoff |
| 6 | IEM Volley Masters | 7 | 2 | 5 | 8 | 10 | 15 | 0.667 | 534 | 551 | 0.969 | |
| 7 | Gamboa Coffee Spikers | 7 | 1 | 6 | 3 | 3 | 19 | 0.158 | 409 | 546 | 0.749 | |
| 8 | Cafe Lupe Sunrisers | 7 | 0 | 7 | 0 | 3 | 21 | 0.143 | 469 | 588 | 0.798 | |

Rules for classification: 3 points = win match in 3 or 4 sets; 2 points = win match in 5 sets; 1 point = lose match in 5 sets; 0 point = lose match in 3 or 4 sets
- All times are in Philippine Standard Time (UTC+08:00)

| Date | Time | | Score | | Set 1 | Set 2 | Set 3 | Set 4 | Set 5 | Total | Report |
|---|---|---|---|---|---|---|---|---|---|---|---|
| Jul 01 | 10:00 | Philippine Air Force Air Spikers | 3–0 | Gamboa Coffee Spikers | 25–19 | 25–10 | 28–26 | – | – | 78–55 | P–2 |
| Jul 01 | 13:00 | Megabuilders Volley Bolts | 3–2 | Philippine Army Troopers | 25–22 | 19–25 | 23–25 | 25–22 | 20–18 | 112–112 | P–2 |
| Jul 02 | 10:00 | Cignal HD Spikers | 3–0 | Cafe Lupe Sunrisers | 25–19 | 25–18 | 25–13 | – | – | 75–50 | P–2 |
| Jul 02 | 13:00 | IEM Volley Masters | 0–3 | Sta. Elena Wrecking Balls | 16–25 | 20–25 | 21–25 | – | – | 57–75 | P–2 |
| Jul 05 | 10:00 | Cafe Lupe Sunrisers | 0–3 | Megabuilders Volley Bolts | 17–25 | 20–25 | 13–25 | – | – | 50–75 | P–2 |
| Jul 05 | 13:00 | Sta. Elena Wrecking Balls | 2–3 | Philippine Air Force Air Spikers | 25–23 | 20–25 | 19–25 | 25–21 | 10–15 | 99–109 | P–2 |
| Jul 08 | 10:00 | Cignal HD Spikers | 3–1 | Sta. Elena Wrecking Balls | 25–22 | 21–25 | 25–23 | 25–20 | – | 96–90 | P–2 |
| Jul 08 | 13:00 | Cafe Lupe Sunrisers | 0–3 | IEM Volley Masters | 18–25 | 25–27 | 19–25 | – | – | 62–77 | P–2 |
| Jul 09 | 10:00 | Megabuilders Volley Bolts | 3–0 | Gamboa Coffee Spikers | 25–23 | 25–11 | 25–16 | – | – | 75–50 | P–2 |
| Jul 09 | 13:00 | Philippine Air Force Air Spikers | 2–3 | Philippine Army Troopers | 20–25 | 25–23 | 25–17 | 22–25 | 14–16 | 106–106 | P–2 |
| Jul 12 | 10:00 | Philippine Army Troopers | 0–3 | Cignal HD Spikers | 20–25 | 19–25 | 17–25 | – | – | 56–75 | P–2 |
| Jul 12 | 13:00 | Gamboa Coffee Spikers | 0–3 | IEM Volley Masters | 22–25 | 17–25 | 13–25 | – | – | 52–75 | P–2 |
| Jul 15 | 10:00 | Cafe Lupe Sunrisers | 1–3 | Philippine Air Force Air Spikers | 26–24 | 18–25 | 15–25 | 20–25 | – | 79–99 | P–2 |
| Jul 15 | 13:00 | IEM Volley Masters | 0–3 | Megabuilders Volley Bolts | 14–25 | 20–25 | 19–25 | – | – | 53–75 | P–2 |
| Jul 16 | 10:00 | Philippine Army Troopers | 1–3 | Sta. Elena Wrecking Balls | 15–25 | 25–22 | 21–25 | 23–25 | – | 84–97 | P–2 |
| Jul 16 | 13:00 | Cignal HD Spikers | 3–0 | Gamboa Coffee Spikers | 25–11 | 25–15 | 25–18 | – | – | 75–44 | Report |
| Jul 19 | 10:00 | Philippine Air Force Air Spikers | 3–2 | IEM Volley Masters | 13–25 | 23–25 | 25–20 | 25–22 | 16–14 | 102–106 | Report |
| Jul 19 | 13:00 | Megabuilders Volley Bolts | 3–0 | Cignal HD Spikers | 26–24 | 26–24 | 25–17 | – | – | 77–65 | Report |
| Jul 22 | 10:00 | Sta. Elena Wrecking Balls | 0–3 | Megabuilders Volley Bolts | 20–25 | 20–25 | 20–25 | – | – | 60–75 | P–2 |
| Jul 22 | 13:00 | Cignal HD Spikers | 3–0 | Philippine Air Force Air Spikers | 25–20 | 25–21 | 25–23 | – | – | 75–64 | Report |
| Jul 23 | 10:00 | Philippine Army Troopers | 3–2 | IEM Volley Masters | 25–23 | 24–26 | 25–21 | 21–25 | 15–11 | 110–106 | Report |
| Jul 23 | 13:00 | Gamboa Coffee Spikers | 3–1 | Cafe Lupe Sunrisers | 25–21 | 25–22 | 18–25 | 27–25 | – | 95–93 | Report |
| Jul 26 | 10:00 | Sta. Elena Wrecking Balls | 3–0 | Gamboa Coffee Spikers | 25–19 | 25–16 | 25–20 | – | – | 75–55 | Report |
| Jul 26 | 13:00 | Cafe Lupe Sunrisers | 0–3 | Philippine Army Troopers | 16–25 | 20–25 | 17–25 | – | – | 53–75 | Report |
| Jul 29 | 10:00 | Philippine Air Force Air Spikers | 3–2 | Megabuilders Volley Bolts | 25–18 | 25–20 | 23–25 | 26–28 | 15–13 | 114–104 | Report |
| Jul 29 | 13:00 | Gamboa Coffee Spikers | 0–3 | Philippine Army Troopers | 21–25 | 18–25 | 19–25 | – | – | 58–75 | Report |
| Jul 30 | 10:00 | IEM Volley Masters | 0–3 | Cignal HD Spikers | 18–25 | 19–25 | 23–25 | – | – | 60–75 | Report |
| Jul 30 | 13:00 | Sta. Elena Wrecking Balls | 3–1 | Cafe Lupe Sunrisers | 17–25 | 25–20 | 25–15 | 25–22 | – | 92–82 | Report |

=== Fourth seed playoff ===
As Army and Sta. Elena are tied for fourth place in terms of win-loss record, a fourth seed playoff was held to determine the final semifinal berth.

| Date | Time | | Score | | Set 1 | Set 2 | Set 3 | Set 4 | Set 5 | Total | Report |
|---|---|---|---|---|---|---|---|---|---|---|---|
| Aug 02 | 13:00 | Philippine Army Troopers | 0–3 | Sta. Elena Wrecking Balls | 17–25 | 19–25 | 27–29 | – | – | 63–79 | Report |

- Sta. Elena Wrecking Balls advances to the semifinals round.

== Bracket ==
Semifinals
1 | Cignal HD Spikers | 3 | 3
4 | Sta. Elena Wrecking Balls | 1 | 0
2 | Megabuilders Volley Bolts | 3 | 3
3 | Philippine Air Force Air Spikers | 2 | 0

Finals
Cignal HD Spikers | 3 | 2 | 3
Megabuilders Volley Bolts | 1 | 3 | 1
3rd place
Philippine Air Force Air Spikers | 3 | 2 | 3
Sta. Elena Wrecking Balls | 1 | 3 | 0

== Semifinals ==
=== (1) Cignal vs. (4) Sta. Elena ===
| Date | Time | | Score | | Set 1 | Set 2 | Set 3 | Set 4 | Set 5 | Total | Report |
|---|---|---|---|---|---|---|---|---|---|---|---|
| Aug 05 | 13:00 | Cignal HD Spikers | 3–1 | Sta. Elena Wrecking Balls | 25–16 | 25–16 | 20–25 | 25–18 | – | 95–75 | P–2 |
| Aug 06 | 10:00 | Sta. Elena Wrecking Balls | 0–3 | Cignal HD Spikers | 21–25 | 18–25 | 20–25 | – | – | 59–75 | P–2 |

=== (2) Megabuilders vs. (3) Air Force ===
| Date | Time | | Score | | Set 1 | Set 2 | Set 3 | Set 4 | Set 5 | Total | Report |
|---|---|---|---|---|---|---|---|---|---|---|---|
| Aug 05 | 10:00 | Megabuilders Volley Bolts | 3–2 | Philippine Air Force Air Spikers | 19–25 | 16–25 | 25–20 | 26–24 | 15–10 | 101–104 | P–2 |
| Aug 06 | 13:00 | Philippine Air Force Air Spikers | 0–3 | Megabuilders Volley Bolts | 23–25 | 22–25 | 24–26 | – | – | 69–76 | P–2 |

== Third place series ==
| Date | Time | | Score | | Set 1 | Set 2 | Set 3 | Set 4 | Set 5 | Total | Report |
|---|---|---|---|---|---|---|---|---|---|---|---|
| Aug 09 | 10:00 | Philippine Air Force Air Spikers | 3–1 | Sta. Elena Wrecking Balls | 25–22 | 25–22 | 23–25 | 25–16 | – | 98–85 | Report |
| Aug 12 | 10:00 | Sta. Elena Wrecking Balls | 3–2 | Philippine Air Force Air Spikers | 27–25 | 22–25 | 18–25 | 25–19 | 16–12 | 108–106 | P–2 |
| Aug 16 | 10:00 | Philippine Air Force Air Spikers | 3–0 | Sta. Elena Wrecking Balls | 25–22 | 25–20 | 25–23 | – | – | 75–65 | Report |

== Finals ==
| Date | Time | | Score | | Set 1 | Set 2 | Set 3 | Set 4 | Set 5 | Total | Report |
|---|---|---|---|---|---|---|---|---|---|---|---|
| Aug 09 | 13:00 | Cignal HD Spikers | 3–1 | Megabuilders Volley Bolts | 25–23 | 21–25 | 25–19 | 25–17 | – | 96–84 | Report |
| Aug 12 | 13:00 | Megabuilders Volley Bolts | 3–2 | Cignal HD Spikers | 18–25 | 25–23 | 26–24 | 22–25 | 15–13 | 106–110 | P–2 |
| Aug 16 | 13:00 | Cignal HD Spikers | 3–1 | Megabuilders Volley Bolts | 25–23 | 25–17 | 22–25 | 25–22 | – | 97–87 | Report |

Open Conference Men's Division Champions
Cignal HD Spikers
Ysay Marasigan (c), Sandy Montero, Josh Villanueva, Ralph Diezmo, Bonjomar Castel, Edmar Bonono,
Lorenzo Capate Jr., Rex Intal, Vince Mangulabnan, Mark Gil Alfafara, Peter Torres, Alexis Faytaren, Herschel Ramos
Head coach: Oliver Almadro

== Awards ==
| Award | | Recipient |
|---|---|---|
| MVP | Finals: Conference: | Lorenzo Capate Jr. (Cignal; both awards) |
| Best Setter | | Vincent Mangulabnan (Cignal) |
| Best Outside Spiker | 1st: 2nd: | Edwin Tolentino (Air Force); Isaah Arda (Sta. Elena) |
| Best Middle Blocker | 1st: 2nd: | Kim Malabunga (Megabuilders); Francis Saura (Megabuilders) |
| Best Opposite Spiker | | Berlin Panglinawan (Sta. Elena) |
| Best Libero | | Sandy Domenick Montero (Cignal) |

== Final standings ==
| Rank | Team |
|---|---|
| 1st place, gold medalist(s) | Cignal HD Spikers |
| 2nd place, silver medalist(s) | Megabuilders Volley Bolts |
| 3rd place, bronze medalist(s) | Philippine Air Force Air Spikers |
| 4 | Sta. Elena Wrecking Balls |
| 5 | Philippine Army Troopers |
| 6 | IEM Volley Masters |
| 7 | Gamboa Coffee Spikers |
| 8 | Cafe Lupe Sunrisers |
