= Volleyball at the 2014 Philippine National Games – men's tournament =

2014 Men's Volleyball
Tournament details
- Dates: 17–23 May
- Teams: 20
- Venues: 2 (in 2 host cities)

Final positions
- Champions: Philippine Air Force (2nd title)

Tournament awards
- MVP: Alnakran Abdilla

The 2014 edition of the POC-PSC Philippine National Games was held in Manila on May 17 to 23, 2014. The Philippine Air Force won the championship.

== Pools composition ==
Pool A	Pool B	Pool C	Pool D
Autonomous Region in Muslim Mindanao; Emilio Aguinaldo College; Philippine Air Force; Rizal Technological University; Zamboanga	College of Saint Benilde; National University Bulldogs; Philippine College of Criminology; San Juan; Silliman University	Cagayan Rising Suns; Cavite Angels; De La Salle Green Spikers; UP Fighting Maroons	Olivarez; Spikers EXC; TVM-Systema; Taguig; Tayabas

== Venue ==
- Arellano University, Taft Avenue, Pasay
- Ninoy Aquino Stadium, Manila

== Pool standing procedure ==
Match won 3–0 or 3–1: 3 points for the winner, 0 points for the loser
Match won 3–2: 2 points for the winner, 1 point for the loser
In case of tie, the teams will be classified according to the following criteria:
number of matches won, sets ratio and points ratio

== Preliminary round ==
=== Pool A ===
Pos	Team	Pld	W	L	Pts	SW	SL	SR	SPW	SPL	SPR	Qualification
1	Philippine Air Force	2	2	0	6	6	0	MAX	151	105	1.438	Semifinals
2	Rizal Technological University	1	1	0	3	3	1	3.000	94	90	1.044	
3	Autonomous Region in Muslim Mindanao	2	1	1	3	3	3	1.000	126	148	0.851	
4	Zamboanga	2	0	2	0	1	6	0.167	163	176	0.926	
5	Emilio Aguinaldo College	1	0	1	0	0	3	0.000	61	76	0.803	

Date	Time		Score		Set 1	Set 2	Set 3	Set 4	Set 5	Total	Report
17 May	08:00	Emilio Aguinaldo College	-	Zamboanga							
17 May		Autonomous Region in Muslim Mindanao	-	Rizal Technological University							
18 May		Philippine Air Force	-	Rizal Technological University							
18 May		Emilio Aguinaldo College	-	Autonomous Region in Muslim Mindanao							
19 May		Zamboanga	0-3	Autonomous Region in Muslim Mindanao	20-25	28-30	25-27			73–0	
19 May		Philippine Air Force	3-0	Emilio Aguinaldo College	26-24	25-18	25-19			76–0	
20 May		Rizal Technological University	-	Emilio Aguinaldo College							
20 May		Zamboanga	–	Philippine Air Force							
20 May		Rizal Technological University	3-1	Zamboanga	25-23	19-25	25-23	25-19		94–0	
21 May		Autonomous Region in Muslim Mindanao	0–3	Philippine Air Force	16-25	20-25	8-25			44–0	

=== Pool B ===
Pos	Team	Pld	W	L	Pts	SW	SL	SR	SPW	SPL	SPR	Qualification
1	National University Bulldogs	2	2	0	6	6	0	MAX	150	82	1.829	Semifinals
2	College of Saint Benilde	1	1	0	3	3	0	MAX	75	47	1.596	
3	Silliman University	2	1	1	2	3	5	0.600	139	172	0.808	
4	Philippine College of Criminology	2	0	2	1	2	6	0.333	144	175	0.823	
5	San Juan	1	0	1	0	0	3	0.000	43	75	0.573	

Date	Time		Score		Set 1	Set 2	Set 3	Set 4	Set 5	Total	Report
17 May		San Juan	–	Philippine College of Criminology							
17 May		Silliman University	-	College of Saint Benilde							
18 May		National University Bulldogs	–	College of Saint Benilde							
18 May		San Juan	–	Silliman University							
19 May		Philippine College of Criminology	2–3	Silliman University	25-19	17-25	22-25	25-16	8-15	97–0	
19 May		National University Bulldogs	3–0	San Juan	25-13	25-15	25-15			75–0	
20 May		Philippine College of Criminology	–	National University Bulldogs							
20 May		College of Saint Benilde	–	San Juan							
21 May		Silliman University	0-3	National University Bulldogs	12-25	15-25	12-25			39–0	
21 May		College of Saint Benilde	3–0	Philippine College of Criminology	25-12	25-17	25-18			75–0	

=== Pool C ===
Pos	Team	Pld	W	L	Pts	SW	SL	SR	SPW	SPL	SPR	Qualification
1	Cagayan Valley Rising Suns	1	1	0	3	3	0	MAX	75	55	1.364	Semifinals
2	De La Salle Green Spikers	2	2	0	6	6	1	6.000	172	133	1.293	
3	National College of Business and Arts	2	1	1	2	4	5	0.800	184	201	0.915	
4	UP Fighting Maroons	2	0	2	1	2	6	0.333	159	180	0.883	
5	Cavite Angels	1	0	1	0	0	3	0.000	54	75	0.720	

Date	Time		Score		Set 1	Set 2	Set 3	Set 4	Set 5	Total	Report
17 May		Cagayan Valley Rising Suns	–	De La Salle Green Spikers							
17 May		National College of Business and Arts	-	Cavite Angels							
18 May		Cagayan Valley Rising Suns	–	National College of Business and Arts							
18 May		UP Fighting Maroons	-	Cavite Angels							
19 May		De La Salle Green Spikers	3–1	National College of Business and Arts	22-25	25-21	25-18	25-15		97–0	
19 May		UP Fighting Maroons	0–3	Cagayan Valley Rising Suns	17-25	16-25	22-25			55–0	
20 May		Cavite Angels	–	Cagayan Valley Rising Suns							
20 May		De La Salle Green Spikers	–	UP Fighting Maroons							
21 May		National College of Business and Arts	3-2	UP Fighting Maroons	21-25	21-25	19-25	25-22	15-13	101–0	
21 May		Cavite Angels	0–3	De La Salle Green Spikers	22-25	12-25	20-25			54–0	

=== Pool D ===
Pos	Team	Pld	W	L	Pts	SW	SL	SR	SPW	SPL	SPR	Qualification
1	TVM-Systema	2	2	0	6	6	1	6.000	174	138	1.261	Semifinals
2	Spikers EXC	1	1	0	3	3	1	3.000	97	81	1.198	
3	Taguig	2	1	1	2	4	5	0.800	191	202	0.946	
4	Olivarez	2	0	2	1	3	6	0.500	187	209	0.895	
5	Tayabas	1	0	1	0	0	3	0.000	56	75	0.747	

Date	Time		Score		Set 1	Set 2	Set 3	Set 4	Set 5	Total	Report
17 May		Taguig	–	Tayabas							
17 May		Spikers EXC	-	Olivarez							
18 May		Spikers EXC	–	TVM-Systema							
18 May		Olivarez	-	Tayabas							
19 May		TVM-Systema	3–1	Olivarez	25-18	25-21	24-26	25-17		99–0	
19 May		Taguig	1–3	Spikers EXC	22-25	25-22	13-25	21-25		81–0	
20 May		Tayabas	–	Spikers EXC							
20 May		TVM-Systema	–	Taguig							
21 May		Olivarez	2-3	Taguig	23-25	25-22	25-23	19-25	13-15	105–0	
20 May		Tayabas	0–3	TVM-Systema	17-25	24-26	15-25			56–0	

== Final round ==
Semifinals
22 May
Philippine Air Force	3
Cagayan Valley Rising Suns	1
22 May
TVM-Systema	1
National University Bulldogs	3

Final
23 May
Philippine Air Force	3
National University Bulldogs	1
3rd-place match
22 May
Cagayan Valley Rising Suns	1
TVM-Systema	3

=== Semifinals ===
Date	Time		Score		Set 1	Set 2	Set 3	Set 4	Set 5	Total	Report
20 May		Philippine Air Force	3–1	Cagayan Valley Rising Suns	21-25	25–17	25–18	29-27		100–35	Results
20 May		TVM-Systema	1–3	National University Bulldogs	31–29	15–25	22–25	19–25		87–104	Results

=== 3rd-place match ===
Date	Time		Score		Set 1	Set 2	Set 3	Set 4	Set 5	Total	Report
22 May		Cagayan Valley Rising Suns	1–3	TVM-Systema	27–25	20–25	21–25	20-25		88–75	Results

=== Final ===
Date	Time		Score		Set 1	Set 2	Set 3	Set 4	Set 5	Total	Report
23 May		Philippine Air Force	3–1	National University Bulldogs	25–19	26–28	25–20	25-11		101–67	Results

== Final standing ==
Rank	Team
1st place, gold medalist(s)	Philippine Air Force
2nd place, silver medalist(s)	National University Bulldogs
3rd place, bronze medalist(s)	TVM-Systema
4	Cagayan Valley Rising Suns

2014 Men's Volleyball Champions

1st title

Team Roster
(c),
Head coach

== Awards ==
- Most valuable player
  Alnakran Abdilla (Philippine Air Force
- Best attacker
  Peter Torres (National University Bulldogs)
- Best blocker
  AJ Pareja (TVM-Systema)
- Best server
  Jeffrey Malabanan (Philippine Air Force)
- Best setter
  Jessie Lopez (Philippine Air Force)
- Best receiver
  Raffy Mosuela (Philippine Air Force)
- Best digger
  Joseph Tipay
- Best coach
  Jasper Jimenez
