= 2017 Premier Volleyball League men's division season =

Third season of the Premier Volleyball League men's division

2017 PVL men's division season
- League: Premier Volleyball League
- Sport: Volleyball
- Duration: April 30 – October 29, 2017
- TV partner: ABS-CBN Sports and Action

Conferences
- Reinforced champions: Cignal
- Reinforced runners-up: Philippine Air Force
- Open champions: Cignal
- Open runners-up: Megabuilders
- Collegiate champions: Ateneo
- Collegiate runners-up: FEU

PVL men's division seasons
- ← 2016 (ST) 2018 →

The 2017 Premier Volleyball League men's division season was the third season of the men's league operated by Sports Vision and the first season of the Spikers' Turf integration into the Premier Volleyball League (PVL). The season ran from April 30 to October 29, 2017. The conference order was reversed from the previous two seasons with the Reinforced Conference coming first, followed by the Collegiate Conference, and culminating with the Open Conference.

== Reinforced Conference ==
=== Participating teams ===
Premier Volleyball League 1st Season Reinforced Open Conference (Men's Division)
Abbr.	Team	Company	Head coach	Team captain
CLS	Cafe Lupe Sunrisers	Cafe Lupe Hostel & Restaurantbox	John Patrick de Guzman	Ralph Ocampo (Mapúa)
CIG	Cignal HD Spikers	Cignal TV, Inc.	Oliver Allan Almadro	Ysay Marasigan (Ateneo)
IEM	IEM Volley Masters	Instituto Estetico Manila	Ernesto Balubar	Rence Ordoñez (Letran)
PAF	Philippine Air Force Air Spikers	Philippine Air Force	Rhovyl Verayo	Jessie Lopez (FEU)
PAR	Philippine Army Troopers	Philippine Army	Rico de Guzman	Benjaylo Labide (FEU)
STE	Sta. Elena Wrecking Balls	Sta. Elena Construction and Development Corporation	Arnold Laniog	Jan Berlin Paglinawan (NU)

=== Preliminary round ===
Pos	Team	Pld	W	L	Pts	SW	SL	SR	SPW	SPL	SPR	Qualification
1	Philippine Air Force Air Spikers	5	4	1	12	12	3	4.000	367	332	1.105	Semifinals
2	Cignal HD Spikers	5	4	1	11	12	7	1.714	444	388	1.144	Semifinals
3	Sta. Elena Wrecking Balls	5	3	2	8	11	8	1.375	431	403	1.069	Semifinals
4	IEM Volley Masters	5	2	3	7	8	10	0.800	401	407	0.985	Fourth-seed playoff
5	Philippine Army Troopers	5	2	3	6	8	11	0.727	397	424	0.936	Fourth-seed playoff
6	Cafe Lupe Sunrisers	5	0	5	1	3	15	0.200	343	429	0.800	

Rules for classification: 3 points = win match in 3 or 4 sets; 2 points = win match in 5 sets; 1 point = lose match in 5 sets; 0 point = lose match in 3 or 4 sets

==== Fourth-seed playoff ====
Date	Time		Score		Set 1	Set 2	Set 3	Set 4	Set 5	Total	Report
Jun 01	13:00	PAR	3–1	IEM	25–16	21–25	25–15	25–23	–	96–79	P–2

=== Final round ===
- All series are best-of-3

Semifinals
1	Philippine Air Force Air Spikers	1	3	3
4	Philippine Army Troopers	3	0	2
2	Cignal HD Spikers	1	3	3
3	Sta. Elena Wrecking Balls	3	0	1

Finals
Philippine Air Force Air Spikers	1	2	–
Cignal HD Spikers	3	3	–
3rd place
Philippine Army Troopers	1	3	–
Sta. Elena Wrecking Balls	3	0	–

=== Final standings ===
Rank	Men's
1st place, gold medalist(s)	Cignal HD Spikers
2nd place, silver medalist(s)	Philippine Air Force Air Spikers
3rd place, bronze medalist(s)	Philippine Army Troopers
4	Sta. Elena Wrecking Balls
5	IEM Volley Masters
6	Cafe Lupe Sunrisers

=== Awards ===
Award		Name
Most Valuable Player	Finals: Conference:	(Philippines) Lorenzo Capate Jr. (Cignal) (Philippines) Alnakran Abdilla (Air Force)
Best Setter		(Philippines) Vincent Raphael Mangulabnan (Cignal)
Best Outside Spiker	1st: 2nd:	(Philippines) Mark Gil Alfafara (Cignal) (Philippines) Fauzi Ismail (Air Force)
Best Middle Blocker	1st: 2nd:	(Philippines) Jayvee Sumagaysay (Army) (Philippines) Gregorio Dolor (IEM)
Best Opposite Spiker		(Philippines) Edward Camposano (Sta. Elena)
Best Libero		(Philippines) Rence Melgar (IEM)

== Open Conference ==
=== Participating teams ===
Premier Volleyball League 1st Season Open Conference (Men's Division)
Abbr.	Team	Company	Head coach	Team captain
CIG	Cignal HD Spikers	Cignal TV, Inc.	Oliver Almadro	Ysay Marasigan
CLS	Cafe Lupe Sunrisers	Cafe Lupe Hostel & Restaurant	Rodrigo Palmero	Ralph Ocampo
GCM	Gamboa Coffee Spikers	Universal Knowledge DermPharma, Inc.	Mario Mia	Sam Damian
IEM	IEM Volley Masters	Instituto Estetico Manila	Renz Ordoñez	Eden Canlas
MEG	Megabuilders Volley Bolts	One Mega Builders Construction Corporation	Dante Alinsunurin	Francis Saura
PAF	Philippine Air Force Air Spikers	Philippine Air Force	Rhovyl Verayo	Jessie Lopez
PAR	Philippine Army Troopers	Philippine Army	Rico de Guzman	Benjaylo Labide
STE	Sta. Elena Wrecking Balls	Sta. Elena Construction and Development Corporation	Arnold Laniog	Jan Berlin Paglinawan

=== Preliminary round ===
Pos	Team	Pld	W	L	Pts	SW	SL	SR	SPW	SPL	SPR	Qualification
1	Cignal HD Spikers	7	6	1	18	18	4	4.500	536	441	1.215	Semifinals
2	Megabuilders Volley Bolts	7	6	1	18	20	5	4.000	593	504	1.177	Semifinals
3	Philippine Air Force Air Spikers	7	5	2	13	17	13	1.308	672	624	1.077	Semifinals
4	Sta. Elena Wrecking Balls	7	4	3	13	15	11	1.364	588	568	1.035	Fourth-seed playoff
5	Philippine Army Troopers	7	4	3	11	15	13	1.154	618	607	1.018	Fourth-seed playoff
6	IEM Volley Masters	7	2	5	8	10	15	0.667	534	551	0.969	
7	Gamboa Coffee Spikers	7	1	6	3	3	19	0.158	409	546	0.749	
8	Cafe Lupe Sunrisers	7	0	7	0	3	21	0.143	469	588	0.798	

Rules for classification: 3 points = win match in 3 or 4 sets; 2 points = win match in 5 sets; 1 point = lose match in 5 sets; 0 point = lose match in 3 or 4 sets

Fourth-seed playoff

Date	Time		Score		Set 1	Set 2	Set 3	Set 4	Set 5	Total	Report
Aug 02	13:00	PAR	0–3	STE	17–25	19–25	27–29	–	–	63–79	Report

- Sta. Elena Wrecking Balls advances to the semifinals round.

=== Final round ===
Semifinals
1	Cignal HD Spikers	3	3
4	Sta. Elena Wrecking Balls	1	0
2	Megabuilders Volley Bolts	3	3
3	Philippine Air Force Air Spikers	2	0

Finals
Cignal HD Spikers	3	2	3
Megabuilders Volley Bolts	1	3	1
3rd place
Philippine Air Force Air Spikers	3	2	3
Sta. Elena Wrecking Balls	1	3	0

=== Final standings ===
Rank	Men's
1st place, gold medalist(s)	Cignal HD Spikers
2nd place, silver medalist(s)	Megabuilders Volley Bolts
3rd place, bronze medalist(s)	Philippine Air Force Air Spikers
4	Sta. Elena Wrecking Balls
5	Philippine Army Troopers
6	IEM Volley Masters
7	Gamboa Coffee Spikers
8	Cafe Lupe Sunrisers

=== Awards ===
Award		Name
Most Valuable Player	Finals: Conference:	Lorenzo Capate Jr. (Cignal)
Best Setter		Vincent Raphael Mangulabnan (Cignal)
Best Outside Spiker	1st: 2nd:	Edwin Tolentino (Air Force); Isaah Arda (Sta. Elena)
Best Middle Blocker	1st: 2nd:	Kim Malabunga (Megabuilders); Francis Philipp Saura (Megabuilders)
Best Opposite Spiker		Berlin Panglinawan (Sta. Elena)
Best Libero		Sandy Domenick Montero (Cignal)

== Collegiate Conference ==
=== Participating teams ===
Premier Volleyball League 1st Season Collegiate Conference (Men's Division)
Abbr.	Team	Head coach	Team captain
ADM	Ateneo Blue Eagles	Oliver Almadro	Karl Irvin Baysa
CSB	Benilde Blazers	Arnold Laniog	Isaah Arda
DLS	De La Salle Green Archers	Norman Miguel	Ruel Asia
FEU	FEU Tamaraws	Reynaldo Diaz Jr.	Richard Solis
NUI	NU Bulldogs	Dante Alinsunurin	Francis Saura
SBC	San Beda Red Lions	Ernesto "Nes" Pamilar	Mark Santos
UST	UST Growling Tigers	Arthur Alan "Odjie" Mamon	Isaiah Icalina
UPD	UP Fighting Maroons	Rodrigo Palmero	Jerry San Pedro

=== Preliminary round ===
Pos	Team	Pld	W	L	Pts	SW	SL	SR	SPW	SPL	SPR	Qualification
1	Ateneo Blue Eagles	7	7	0	21	21	1	21.000	547	428	1.278	Semifinals
2	FEU Tamaraws	7	5	2	15	18	10	1.800	641	616	1.041	Semifinals
3	NU Bulldogs	7	4	3	13	16	13	1.231	646	608	1.063	Semifinals
4	UST Growling Tigers	7	4	3	12	13	11	1.182	566	508	1.114	Semifinals
5	San Beda Red Lions	7	3	4	8	11	14	0.786	544	582	0.935	
6	De La Salle Green Archers	7	3	4	8	11	16	0.688	605	638	0.948	
7	UP Fighting Maroons	7	2	5	5	8	18	0.444	534	623	0.857	
8	Benilde Blazers	7	0	7	2	6	21	0.286	564	644	0.876	

Rules for classification: 3 points = win match in 3 or 4 sets; 2 points = win match in 5 sets; 1 point = lose match in 5 sets; 0 point = lose match in 3 or 4 sets

=== Final round ===
- All series are best-of-3

Semifinals
1	Ateneo Blue Eagles	3	1	3
4	UST Growling Tigers	0	3	1
2	FEU Tamaraws	3	3
3	NU Bulldogs	2	2

Finals
Ateneo Blue Eagles	3	3
FEU Tamaraws	0	0
3rd place
NU Bulldogs	2	1
UST Growling Tigers	3	3

=== Final standings ===
Rank	Men's
1st place, gold medalist(s)	Ateneo Blue Eagles
2nd place, silver medalist(s)	FEU Tamaraws volleyball
3rd place, bronze medalist(s)	UST Growling Tigers
4	NU Bulldogs
5	San Beda Red Lions
6	De La Salle Green Archers
7	UP Fighting Maroons
8	Benilde Blazers

=== Awards ===
Award		Name
Most Valuable Player	Finals and Conference:	Marck Espejo (Ateneo)
Best Setter		Ish Polvorosa (Ateneo)
Best Outside Spiker	1st: 2nd:	Marck Espejo (Ateneo); Fauzi Ismail (NU)
Best Middle Blocker	1st: 2nd:	John Paul Bugaoan (FEU); Kim Malabunga (NU)
Best Opposite Spiker		Joshua Umandal (UST)
Best Libero		Manuel Sumanguid III (Ateneo)

== Conference Results ==
Conference	Champion	Runner-up	3rd	4th	5th	6th	7th	8th
Reinforced	Cignal	Air Force	Army	Sta.Elena	IEM	CafeLupe	—N/a	
Open	Cignal	Megabuilders	Air Force	Sta.Elena	Army	IEM	Gamboa	CafeLupe
Collegiate	Ateneo	FEU	UST	NU	San Beda	De La Salle	UP	Benilde

== All-Star Game ==
At the end of the season, the league hosted an all-star exhibition match on October 29, 2017 at the Filoil Flying V Centre in San Juan.
