= AJ Pareja =

Filipino volleyball player

Personal information
- Full name: Andre Joseph Pareja
- Nationality: Filipino
- Born: May 2, 1988 (age 38)
- Height: 1.94 m (6 ft 4 in)
- Education: Ateneo de Manila University

Volleyball information
- Position: Middle Blocker

Andre Joseph Pareja (born May 2, 1988) is a Filipino beach volleyball and former indoor volleyball player.

== Career ==
=== Collegiate ===
Pareja play for the Blue Eagles of Ateneo de Manila University in the UAAP.

He played his last playing year with Ateneo in Season 72, where he became Season's MVP and Best Attacker.

=== Clubs ===
In 2013, he was signed by the Systema Active Smashers and play in the 2013 PSL Grand Prix Conference, where they bagged the silver medal.

In 2019, he came back playing in volleyball and joined Cignal HD Spikers in the Spikers' Turf.

After his stint with Cignal, he started to play in the beach volleyball and joined different beach volleyball competition.

== Education ==
Pareja graduated high school from Lourdes College in Cagayan De Oro City. He finished his Bachelor of Science Degree in Biology at the Ateneo de Manila University and studied medicine at the Ateneo School of Medicine and Public Health. He passed the physician licensure exam in 2014.

== Clubs ==
- (Philippines) Systema Active Smashers (2013)
- (Philippines) Cignal HD Spikers

== Awards ==
=== Individual ===
Year	League	Season/Conference	Award	Ref
2010	UAAP	72	Most Valuable Player (Season)	
2010	UAAP	72	Best Attacker	
2013	PSL	Grand Prix	1st Best Middle Blocker	
2014	POC-PSC	Philippine National Games	Best Blocker	

=== Collegiate ===
Ateneo Blue Eagles

Year	UAAP Season	Award	Ref
2010	72	3rd place	

=== Clubs ===
Year	League	Season/Conference	Club	Title	Ref
2013	PSL	Grand Prix	Systema Active Smashers	Runner Up	
2014	POC-PSC	Philippine National Games	TVM-Systema	3rd place	
2019	Spikers' Turf	Open	Cignal HD Spikers	Champions	
