= 2017 Premier Volleyball League Collegiate Conference – Men's division =

Third men's tournament of the 2017 PVL season

2017 Premier Volleyball League Collegiate Conference
- Duration: September 2 – October 14, 2017
- Teams: 8
- TV partner(s): ABS-CBN Sports and Action

Results
- Champions: Ateneo Blue Eagles
- Runners-up: FEU Tamaraws
- Third place: UST Growling Tigers
- Fourth place: NU Bulldogs

Awards
- Conference MVP: Marck Espejo
- Finals MVP: Marck Espejo
- Best OH: Marck Espejo; Fauzi Ismail
- Best MB: John Paul Bugaoan; Kim Malabunga
- Best OPP: Joshua Umandal
- Best Setter: Ish Polvorosa
- Best Libero: Manuel Sumanguid III

PVL Collegiate Conference chronology
- < 2016 (ST) 2018 >

PVL conference chronology
- < 2017 Open 2018 Reinforced >

The men's division of the 2017 Premier Volleyball League Collegiate Conference was the third and final conference of the 2017 Premier Volleyball League men's division season. The conference started on September 2, 2017 at the Filoil Flying V Centre, San Juan.

== Teams ==
Premier Volleyball League 1st Season Collegiate Conference (Men's Division)
Abbr.	Team	Head coach	Team captain
ADM	Ateneo Blue Eagles	Oliver Almadro	Karl Irvin Baysa
CSB	Benilde Blazers	Arnold Laniog	Isaah Arda
DLS	De La Salle Green Archers	Norman Miguel	Ruel Asia
FEU	FEU Tamaraws	Reynaldo Diaz Jr.	Richard Solis
NUI	NU Bulldogs	Dante Alinsunurin	Francis Saura
SBC	San Beda Red Lions	Ernesto "Nes" Pamilar	Mark Santos
UST	UST Growling Tigers	Arthur Alan "Odjie" Mamon	Isaiah Icalina
UPD	UP Fighting Maroons	Rodrigo Palmero	Jerry San Pedro

Line-up

Legend
G	Guest Player
S	Setter
MH	Middle Hitter
OH	Outside Hitter
OP	Opposite Hitter
L	Libero
(c)	Team captain
HC	Head coach

Ateneo Blue Eagles
No.	Name	Position
1	MAGADIA, Lawrence Gil	S
2	BAYSA, Karl Irvin (c)	OH
3	MEDALLA, Ron Adrian	OP
5	TAN, Jasper Rodney	MH
9	LABAO, Hermino	OH
10	TRINIDAD, Paulo Lorenzo	OP
12	NJIGHA, Chumason Celestine	MH
13	SUMANGUID, Manuel III	L
14	POLVOROSA, Esmilzo Joner	S
15	ESPEJO, Marck Jesus	OH
16	GLORIOSO, Gian Carlo	MH
17	CUERVA, Sebastian Enrique	OH
18	RIVERA, Ishmael John	OH
19	LLENOS, Canciano	OH
	ALMADRO, Oliver Allan	HC

Benilde Blazers
No.	Name	Position
1	MAGSINO, Kevin	S
2	MONTANO, Josh Renen	OH
4	ARDA, Isaah Oneal (c)	OH
5	SALDAVIA, Sean Anthony	
6	BAUTISTA, Anthony	
7	BACANI, Owen	
8	ORIAN, Mark Jethro	MH
9	DY, Aljian Paul	L
10	ROJAS, Rod Tyron	
11	ABBOT, Ruvince	
12	GARCIA, Russel	L
14	BASILAN, Francis	
15	SAN MIGUEL, Joshua	
19	DE SEQUERA, Jerico	
	LANIOG, Arnold	HC

De La Salle Green Archers
No.	Name	Position
1	MACASPAC, Rafael	L
2	BACON, Geriant Bell	
3	WOO, Raymark	OH
4	HENDRIYANTO, Randy	OH
5	DE LOS REYES, John David	MH
6	MOVIDO, Jopet Adrian	L
7	DUMAGO, Cris Bernard	OP
8	ONIA, John Arjay	OH
9	MARCO, Wayne Ferdi	S
10	JOSE, Joshua	MB
11	ASIA, Reuel (c)	OH
13	REYES, Keiffer	MB
15	MARAVILLA, Zosimo	OH
18	DIMAYUGA, Levin Anthony	OP
	MIGUEL, Norman	HC

FEU Tamaraws
No.	Name	Position
1	BARRICA, Jeremiah	L
2	SOLIS, Richard (c)	OP
3	SILANG, Kris Cian	S
4	SUAREZ, Owen Jaime	S
5	MAMERTO, Rikko Marius	L
7	GARCIA, Jude	OH
8	BUGAOAN, John Paul	MB
9	DETABLAN, Christian	
10	PALER, Redijohn	OH
11	DABLO, Ralph	MB
12	SALBSAB, John Paul	OH
14	BAUTISTA, Raymond	
15	QUIEL, Peter John	OH
17	PROVIDO, Salmar	OH
	DIAZ, Reynaldo Jr.	HC

NU Bulldogs
No.	Name	Position
1	BAGUNAS, Bryan	OH
3	DAYANDANTE, Kim Harold	S
4	OGOC, John Vincent	OH
5	PONTI, Krisvan	OH
6	MONDERO, Banjo	OH
7	ANCHETA, Jann Paulo	OH
8	SUMAGUI, Jann Mariano	L
9	NATIVIDAD, James Martin	OH
10	ISMAIL, Fauzi	OH
12	SAURA, Francis Philip (c)	MH
14	DAYMIL, Berhashidin	MH
15	MARCOS, Ricky	L
16	BAYSAC, Ruben	MH
17	MALABUNGA, Kim Niño	MH
18	GAMPONG, Madzlan	OP
	ALINSUNURIN, Dante	HC

San Beda Red Lions
No.	Name	Position
1	AMAGAN, Jomaru	OH
2	GENOBATEN, Gian Carlo	OH
3	TORRES, Angelo	MH
4	VIRAY, Aldrin	OH
5	MANLICLIC, Yeshua	
6	PATENIO, Limuel	OP
7	CASIN, Rodel Nelas	L
8	GONZALES, Bryan James	
9	ULIBAS, Ferdinand	
11	ENCISO, Mark Christian	OP
14	GONZALES, Earl Kenneth	
15	SANTOS, Mark Lorenze (c)	OH
16	DESUYO, John Carlo	
17	ZABALA, Gerard	
	PAMILAR, Ernesto	HC

UST Growling Tigers
No.	Name	Position
1	SAWAL, Lester Kim Sawal	L
2	VALENZUELA, Vyxen Vaughn	OH
3	BAUSTITA, Arnold Jr.	OH
4	TAJANLANGIT, Jerald David	L
5	MILLADO, John Michael	
6	CASILAN, Aldous Darcy	
7	SUMAGAYSAY, Jayvee	MB
9	TAJANLANGIT, Timothy James	S
10	MEDINA, Manuel Andrei	OH
11	UMANDAL, Joshua	
12	CORDA, Hermel Gem	
14	BURO, Juren Jireh	
15	ICALINA, Isaiah (c)	
16	CARODAN, Tyrone Jan	OP
	MAMON, Arthur Alan "Odjie"	HC

UP Fighting Maroons
No.	Name	Position
1	BALDELOVAR, Jarahmeel	S
2	CONSUELO, Nicolo Brylle	OH
3	SAN PEDRO, Jerry Earl Jr. (c)	OH
4	CASTILLO, John Mark Joshua	MB
5	GOHOC, Matthew	MB
7	NASOL, John Miguel	L
8	FORTES, Joshua Emmanuel	OH
9	MADRIGALEOS, John Carlo	L
10	MIGUEL, Wendel	OH
12	MILLETE, John Mark	OP
13	IJIRAN, Ruskin Joss	
14	YAN, Martin David	
15	ACUÑA, Charles Drake	S
16	SAN PASCUAL, Gian Kyle	MB
	PALMERO, Rodrigo	HC

== Format ==
Preliminary round

The eight teams compete in a single round-robin tournament, with each team playing one match against all other teams for a total of seven matches. The top four teams will advance to the semifinals while the bottom four will be eliminated and ranked 5th through 8th in the final standings.

Semifinals

The top four teams from the preliminary round compete in the semifinals. Teams compete in best-of-three series with the winners advancing to the finals while the losers will compete in the third place series. The match-ups for the semifinals are as follows:

- SF1: PR #1 vs. PR #4
- SF2: PR #2 vs. PR #3

Third place series

The losing teams from the semifinals compete in a best-of-three series to determine which team will finish third in this conference. If the series is tied at 1–1 when the championship is decided, the pool standing procedure will be used (starting from set ratio).

Finals

The winning teams from the semifinals compete in a best-of-three series to determine the conference champions. The losing team in this round will be declared conference runners-up.

== Pool standing procedure ==
Teams are initially ranked by wins followed by match points. A win awards three points if the match lasted for three or four sets (3–0 or 3–1), or two points if the match lasted for five sets (3–2). A loss only awards one point if the match lasted for five sets (2–3).

If multiple teams tie for wins and match points, the next criteria are set ratio (the number of sets won divided by number of sets lost across all matches) and point ratio (the number of points won divided by number of points lost across all matches). If any teams are still tied, the procedure will be applied again, but only considering matches between the remaining tied teams.

== Preliminary round ==
Pos	Team	Pld	W	L	Pts	SW	SL	SR	SPW	SPL	SPR	Qualification
1	Ateneo Blue Eagles	7	7	0	21	21	1	21.000	547	428	1.278	Semifinals
2	FEU Tamaraws	7	5	2	15	18	10	1.800	641	616	1.041	Semifinals
3	NU Bulldogs	7	4	3	13	16	13	1.231	646	608	1.063	Semifinals
4	UST Growling Tigers	7	4	3	12	13	11	1.182	566	508	1.114	Semifinals
5	San Beda Red Lions	7	3	4	8	11	14	0.786	544	582	0.935	
6	De La Salle Green Archers	7	3	4	8	11	16	0.688	605	638	0.948	
7	UP Fighting Maroons	7	2	5	5	8	18	0.444	534	623	0.857	
8	Benilde Blazers	7	0	7	2	6	21	0.286	564	644	0.876	

Rules for classification: 3 points = win match in 3 or 4 sets; 2 points = win match in 5 sets; 1 point = lose match in 5 sets; 0 point = lose match in 3 or 4 sets

Match results

- All times are in Philippines Standard Time (UTC+08:00)

Date	Time		Score		Set 1	Set 2	Set 3	Set 4	Set 5	Total	Report
Sep 02	10:00	De La Salle Green Archers	3–1	Benilde Blazers	25–27	26–24	25–23	25–22	–	101–96	P–2
Sep 02	13:00	UP Fighting Maroons	0–3	UST Growling Tigers	17–25	22–25	15–25	–	–	54–75	P–2
Sep 03	10:00	NU Bulldogs	3–0	San Beda Red Lions	25–15	25–16	25–18	–	–	75–49	P–2
Sep 03	13:00	Ateneo Blue Eagles	3–1	FEU Tamaraws	25–20	25–21	25–20	–	–	75–61	P–2
Sep 04	08:00	Benilde Blazers	2–3	UP Fighting Maroons	18–25	25–21	23–25	25–21	14–16	105–108	P–2
Sep 04	10:00	UST Growling Tigers	3–0	De La Salle Green Archers	25–17	25–13	25–22	–	–	75–52	P–2
Sep 06	08:00	San Beda Red Lions	0–3	Ateneo Blue Eagles	23–25	16–25	25–27	–	–	64–77	P–2
Sep 06	10:00	FEU Tamaraws	3–2	NU Bulldogs	25–23	21–25	25–21	14–25	15–13	100–107	P–2
Sep 09	08:00	Ateneo Blue Eagles	3–0	UST Growling Tigers	25–21	25–17	25–18	–	–	75–56	P–2
Sep 09	10:00	De La Salle Green Archers	1–3	FEU Tamaraws	23–25	19–25	25–23	18–25	–	85–98	P–2
Sep 11	08:00	UP Fighting Maroons	0–3	San Beda Red Lions	22–25	22–25	19–25	–	–	63–75	P–2
Sep 11	10:00	NU Bulldogs	2–3	De La Salle Green Archers	29–31	23–25	25–20	25–19	6–15	108–110	P–2
Sep 13	08:00	Benilde Blazers	0–3	Ateneo Blue Eagles	13–25	22–25	22–25	–	–	57–75	P–2
Sep 13	10:00	FEU Tamaraws	3–0	UST Growling Tigers	25–23	25–23	26–24	–	–	76–70	P–2a
Sep 16	08:00	San Beda Red Lions	1–3	De La Salle Green Archers	16–25	25–23	16–25	30–32	–	87–105	P–2
Sep 16	10:00	Ateneo Blue Eagles	3–0	UP Fighting Maroons	25–18	25–18	25–18	–	–	75–54	P–2b
Sep 18	08:00	UST Growling Tigers	1–3	NU Bulldogs	21–25	25–17	25–27	23–25	–	94–94	P–2
Sep 18	10:00	Benilde Blazers	0–3	FEU Tamaraws	22–25	25–27	21–25	–	–	68–77	P–2c
Sep 23	08:00	NU Bulldogs	3–1	UP Fighting Maroons	25–13	24–26	25–15	25–17	–	99–71	P–2
Sep 23	10:00	De La Salle Green Archers	0–3	Ateneo Blue Eagles	15–25	20–25	22–25	–	–	57–75	P–2
Sep 25	08:00	UP Fighting Maroons	1–3	FEU Tamaraws	22–25	25–23	24–26	14–25	–	85–99	P–2
Sep 25	10:00	San Beda Red Lions	3–0	Benilde Blazers	25–23	25–15	25–22	–	–	75–60	P–2
Sep 27	08:00	UST Growling Tigers	3–1	San Beda Red Lions	25–21	25–20	23–25	25–22	–	98–88	P–2
Sep 27	10:00	De La Salle Green Archers	1–3	UP Fighting Maroons	22–25	25–22	25–27	23–25	–	95–99	P–2
Sep 30	08:00	Benilde Blazers	1–3	UST Growling Tigers	14–25	10–25	25–23	20–25	–	69–98	P–2
Sep 30	10:00	Ateneo Blue Eagles	3–0	NU Bulldogs	25–19	25–19	25–15	–	–	75–53	P–2
Oct 02	08:00	FEU Tamaraws	2–3	San Beda Red Lions	27–29	25–15	20–25	25–22	7–15	104–106	P–2
Oct 02	10:00	NU Bulldogs	3–2	Benilde Blazers	25–27	29–27	25–19	16–25	15–11	110–109	P–2

== Bracket ==
- All series are best-of-3

Semifinals
1	Ateneo Blue Eagles	3	1	3
4	UST Growling Tigers	0	3	1
2	FEU Tamaraws	3	3
3	NU Bulldogs	2	2

Finals
Ateneo Blue Eagles	3	3
FEU Tamaraws	0	0
3rd place
NU Bulldogs	2	1
UST Growling Tigers	3	3

== Semifinals ==
=== (1) Ateneo vs. (4) UST ===
Date	Time		Score		Set 1	Set 2	Set 3	Set 4	Set 5	Total	Report
Oct 04	08:00	Ateneo Blue Eagles	3–0	UST Growling Tigers	25–19	25–15	25–21	–	–	75–55	P–2
Oct 07	10:00	UST Growling Tigers	3–1	Ateneo Blue Eagles	25–22	25–23	22–25	25–21	–	97–91	P–2
Oct 09	16:00	Ateneo Blue Eagles	3–1	UST Growling Tigers	22–25	25–22	31–29	25–13	–	103–89	P–2

=== (2) FEU vs. (3) NU ===
Date	Time		Score		Set 1	Set 2	Set 3	Set 4	Set 5	Total	Report
Oct 04	10:00	FEU Tamaraws	3–2	NU Bulldogs	25–22	19–25	19–25	25–22	16–14	104–108	P–2
Oct 07	08:00	NU Bulldogs	2–3	FEU Tamaraws	14–25	25–16	22–25	25–22	12–15	98–103	P–2

== Third place series ==
Date	Time		Score		Set 1	Set 2	Set 3	Set 4	Set 5	Total	Report
Oct 11	08:00	NU Bulldogs	2–3	UST Growling Tigers	25–17	26–28	25–20	21–25	25–27	122–117	P–2
Oct 14	08:00	UST Growling Tigers	3–1	NU Bulldogs	21–25	30–28	28–26	25–21	–	104–100	P–2

== Finals ==
Date	Time		Score		Set 1	Set 2	Set 3	Set 4	Set 5	Total	Report
Oct 11	10:00	Ateneo Blue Eagles	3–0	FEU Tamaraws	25–22	25–20	25–19	–	–	75–61	P–2
Oct 14	10:00	FEU Tamaraws	0–3	Ateneo Blue Eagles	21–25	22–25	16–25	–	–	59–75	P–2

Collegiate Conference Men's Division Champions
Ateneo de Manila University Blue Eagles
Lawrence Gil Magadia, Karl Irvin Baysa (c), Ron Adrian Medalla, Jasper Rodney Tan, Hermino Labao, Paulo Lorenzo Trinidad, Chumason Celestine Njigha, Manuel Sumanguid III, Esmilzo Joner Polvorosa, Marck Jesus Espejo, Gian Carlo Glorioso, Sebastian Enrique Cuerva, Ishmael John Rivera, Canciano Llenos
Head coach: Oliver Almadro

== Awards ==
- Most Valuable Player (Finals)
  - Marck Espejo (Ateneo)
- Most Valuable Player (Conference)
  - Marck Espejo (Ateneo)
- Best Outside Spikers
  - Marck Espejo (Ateneo)
  - Fauzi Ismail (NU)
- Best Setter
  - Ish Polvorosa (Ateneo)
- Best Opposite Spiker
  - Joshua Umandal (UST)
- Best Middle Blockers
  - John Paul Bugaoan (FEU)
  - Kim Malabunga (NU)
- Best Libero
  - Manuel Sumanguid III (Ateneo)

== Final standings ==
Rank	Team
1st place, gold medalist(s)	Ateneo Blue Eagles
2nd place, silver medalist(s)	FEU Tamaraws
3rd place, bronze medalist(s)	UST Growling Tigers
4	NU Bulldogs
5	San Beda Red Lions
6	De La Salle Green Archers
7	UP Fighting Maroons
8	Benilde Blazers
