= 2014 Philippine Super Liga All-Filipino Conference =

First conference of the 2014 Philippine Super Liga season

- Duration: May 16 – July 26, 2014
- Teams: Women's: 7 Men's: 5
- TV partner(s): Solar Sports

Women's division
- Champions: Generika–Army Lady Troopers
- Runners-up: RC Cola–Air Force Raiders
- Third place: PLDT Home TVolution Power Attackers
- Fourth place: AirAsia Flying Spikers
- MVP: Tina Salak
- Best OH: Stephanie Mercado; Joy Cases
- Best MB: Aby Maraño; Ging Balse
- Best OPP: Sue Roces
- Best Setter: Rhea Dimaculangan
- Best Libero: Lizlee Ann Pantone

Men's division
- Champions: PLDT Home Telpad–Air Force Turbo Boosters
- Runners-up: Cignal HD Spikers
- Third place: Systema Active Smashers
- Fourth place: Instituto Estetico Manila Phoenix Volley Masters
- MVP: Alnakran Abdilla
- Best OH: Alnakran Abdilla; Howard Mojica
- Best MB: Chris Macasaet; Alexis Faytaren
- Best OPP: Gilbert Ablan
- Best Setter: Jessie Lopez
- Best Libero: Raffy Mosuela

PSL All-Filipino Conference chronology
- 2015 >

PSL conference chronology
- < 2013 Grand Prix 2014 Grand Prix >

The 2014 Philippine Super Liga All-Filipino Conference was the first conference of the 2014 season of the Philippine Super Liga (PSL). The tournament ran from May 16, 2014 to July 26, 2014. The tournament's major sponsor was PLDT Home DSL.

Seven teams took part in the women's division with the debuting AirAsia Flying Spikers. Five teams took part in the men's division which saw three new teams: the Cignal HD Spikers men's team, Instituto Estetico Manila Phoenix Volley Masters, and Via Mare Voyagers; while the Giligan's Sisig Kings and Maybank Tigers both left.

The Generika–Army Lady Troopers won the women's tournament, giving them three consecutive women's titles, while the PLDT Home Telpad–Air Force Turbo Boosters won the men's tournament, making them back-to-back champions.

== Women's division ==
2014 Philippine Super Liga All-Filipino Conference – Women's division
Abbr.	Team	Affiliation	Head coach	Team captain
AIR	AirAsia Flying Spikers	AirAsia Philippines	Ramil de Jesus	Charleen Abigail Cruz (DLSU)
CAG	Cagayan Valley Lady Rising Suns	Alvaro Antonio	Nestor Pamilar	Maria Angeli Tabaquero
CIG	Cignal HD Spikers	Cignal TV, Inc.	Sammy Acaylar	Michelle Datuin
GEN-PA	Generika–Army Lady Troopers	Erikagen, Inc. and Philippine Army	Enrico De Guzman	Maria Theresa Iratay
PET	Petron Blaze Spikers	Petron Corporation	George Pascua	Gretchen Ho
PLDT	PLDT Home TVolution Power Attackers	Philippine Long Distance Telephone Company	Roger Gorayeb	Sue Roces
RCC	RC Cola–Air Force Raiders	ARC Refreshments Corporation	Clarence Esteban	Wendy Semana

=== Format ===
Classification round

- The classification round was a single round-robin tournament, with each team playing one match against all other teams in their pool for a total of six matches.
- The top two teams earned a bye to the semifinals while teams ranked third to sixth started in the quarterfinals. The seventh-place team was eliminated.

Quarterfinals

- The quarterfinals featured single-elimination matches.
- The match-ups were as follows:
  - QF1: #3 vs. #6
  - QF2: #4 vs. #5
- The winners advanced to the semifinals while the losers would play in the fifth-place match.

Semifinals

- The semifinals also featured single-elimination matches.
- The match-ups were as follows:
  - SF1: #1 vs. QF2 winner
  - SF2: #2 vs. QF1 winner
- The winners advanced to the championship match while the losers would play in the third-place match.

Finals

- The championship, third-place, and fifth-place matches were all single-elimination.
- The match-ups were as follows:
  - Championship match: Semifinal round winners
  - Third-place match: Semifinal round losers
  - Fifth-place match: Quarterfinal round losers

=== Classification round ===
Pos	Team	Pld	W	L	Pts	SW	SL	SR	SPW	SPL	SPR	Qualification
1	Generika–Army Lady Troopers	6	4	2	13	15	8	1.875	546	492	1.110	Semifinals
2	RC Cola–Air Force Raiders	6	4	2	11	13	8	1.625	480	442	1.086	Semifinals
3	Petron Blaze Spikers	6	4	2	11	13	10	1.300	439	404	1.087	Quarterfinals
4	AirAsia Flying Spikers	6	4	2	11	13	10	1.300	415	427	0.972	Quarterfinals
5	Cagayan Valley Lady Rising Suns	6	2	4	7	10	13	0.769	512	514	0.996	Quarterfinals
6	PLDT Home TVolution Power Attackers	6	2	4	6	9	12	0.750	532	584	0.911	Quarterfinals
7	Cignal HD Spikers	5	1	4	4	5	13	0.385	453	521	0.869	

Date	Time		Score		Set 1	Set 2	Set 3	Set 4	Set 5	Total	Report
16 May	16:00	AirAsia Flying Spikers	3–0	Cagayan Valley Lady Rising Suns	26–24	25–19	27–25			78–68	P2
21 May	14:00	PLDT Home TVolution Power Attackers	2–3	Petron Blaze Spikers	27–25	23–25	25–19	24–26	10–15	109–110	P2
21 May	16: 00	AirAsia Flying Spikers	3–2	Cignal HD Spikers	25–21	25–21	20–25	23–25	15–11	108–103	P2
25 May	15:00	Cagayan Valley Lady Rising Suns	1–3	PLDT Home TVolution Power Attackers	22–25	22–25	25–20	23–25		92–95	P2
25 May	17:00	RC Cola–Air Force Raiders	3–0	Cignal HD Spikers	25–17	25–21	25–22			75–60	P2
28 May	14:00	Generika–Army Lady Troopers	2–3	PLDT Home TVolution Power Attackers	26–28	25–16	27–29	25–13	12–15	115–101	P2
28 May	16:00	Cagayan Valley Lady Rising Suns	1–3	Petron Blaze Spikers	25–22	14–25	20–25	21–25		80–97	P2
1 June	15:00	RC Cola–Air Force Raiders	3–0	PLDT Home TVolution Power Attackers	25–18	25–23	25–18			75–59	P2
1 June	17:00	Cagayan Valley Lady Rising Suns	3–1	Generika–Army Lady Troopers	25–17	25–21	23–25	25–17		98–80	P2
4 June	14:00	Cagayan Valley Lady Rising Suns	2–3	RC Cola–Air Force Raiders	25–21	14–25	25–19	19–25	12–15	95–105	P2
4 June	16:00	Generika–Army Lady Troopers	3–0	Cignal HD Spikers	26–24	25–11	25–22			76–57	P2
8 June	15:00	RC Cola–Air Force Raiders	0–3	Petron Blaze Spikers	22–25	13–25	24–26			59–76	P2
8 June	17:00	AirAsia Flying Spikers	1–3	Generika–Army Lady Troopers	20–25	25–23	20–25	15–25		80–98	P2
11 June	14:00	AirAsia Flying Spikers	0–3	RC Cola–Air Force Raiders	17–25	18–25	15–25			50–75	P2
15 June	15:00	AirAsia Flying Spikers	3–1	PLDT Home TVolution Power Attackers	24–26	25–19	25–20	25–18		99–83	P2
15 June	17:00	Cagayan Valley Lady Rising Suns	3–0	Cignal HD Spikers	25–14	29–27	25–18			79–59	P2
18 June	14:00	Generika–Army Lady Troopers	3–1	RC Cola–Air Force Raiders	25–21	27–29	25–20	25–21		102–91	P2
18 June	16:00	PLDT Home TVolution Power Attackers	1–3	Cignal HD Spikers	20–25	23–25	25–18	17–25		85–93	P2
02 July	14:00	Generika–Army Lady Troopers	3–0	Petron Blaze Spikers	25–23	25–23	25–19			75–65	P2
05 July	16:00	AirAsia Flying Spikers	3–1	Petron Blaze Spikers	25–23	19–25	25–19	25–23		94–90	P2
09 July	14:00	Petron Blaze Spikers	3–1	Cignal HD Spikers	25–17	23–25	25–20	25–19		98–81	P2

=== Playoffs ===
Quarterfinals
4	AirAsia	3
5	Cagayan Valley	2
3	Petron	1
6	PLDT	3

Semifinals
1	Generika–Army	3
4	AirAsia	0
2	RC Cola–Air Force	3
6	PLDT	2

Championship
1	Generika–Army	3
2	RC Cola–Air Force	0

==== Quarterfinals ====
Date	Time		Score		Set 1	Set 2	Set 3	Set 4	Set 5	Total	Report
13 July	15:00	Petron Blaze Spikers	1–3	PLDT Home TVolution Power Attackers	25–16	21–25	18–25	22–25		86–91	P2
13 July	17:00	AirAsia Flying Spikers	3–2	Cagayan Valley Lady Rising Suns	16–25	16–25	25–16	25–17	15–13	97–96	P2

==== Semifinals ====
Date	Time		Score		Set 1	Set 2	Set 3	Set 4	Set 5	Total	Report
20 July	15:00	RC Cola–Air Force Raiders	3–2	PLDT Home TVolution Power Attackers	16–25	25–21	19–25	25–20	15–12	100–103	P2
20 July	17:00	Generika–Army Lady Troopers	3–0	AirAsia Flying Spikers	25–19	25–23	25–16			75–58	P2

==== Finals ====
===== Fifth place match =====
Date	Time		Score		Set 1	Set 2	Set 3	Set 4	Set 5	Total	Report
23 July	14:00	Petron Blaze Spikers	3–0	Cagayan Valley Lady Rising Suns	25–22	25–19	25–23			75–64	P2

===== Third place match =====
Date	Time		Score		Set 1	Set 2	Set 3	Set 4	Set 5	Total	Report
26 July	13:30	PLDT Home TVolution Power Attackers	3–1	AirAsia Flying Spikers	25–17	18–25	25–18	25–23		93–83	

===== Championship match =====
Date	Time		Score		Set 1	Set 2	Set 3	Set 4	Set 5	Total	Report
26 July	17:30	RC Cola–Air Force Raiders	0–3	Generika–Army Lady Troopers	22–25	19–25	16–25			57–75	

=== Final standing ===
Rank	Team
1st place, gold medalist(s)	Generika–Army Lady Troopers
2nd place, silver medalist(s)	RC Cola–Air Force Raiders
3rd place, bronze medalist(s)	PLDT Home TVolution Power Attackers
4	AirAsia Flying Spikers
5	Petron Blaze Spikers
6	Cagayan Valley Lady Rising Suns
7	Cignal HD Spikers

2014 Philippine Super Liga All-Filipino Conference
Women's Division Champions
Generika–Army Lady Troopers
3rd title

Team roster
1 Genie Sabas
5 Mary Jean Balse (c)
6 Jacqueline Alarca
7 Joyce Palad
8 Jovelyn Gonzaga
10 Angela Nunag
11 Dahlia Cruz
12 Ma. Theresa Iratay
13 Rachel Daquis
14 Nerissa Bautista
15 Christine Agno
16 Sara Jane Gonzales
17 Tina Salak
18 Jessey Laine De Leon

Head coach
Sgt. Rico Deguzman

== Men's division ==
2014 Philippine Super Liga All-Filipino Conference – Men's division
Abbr.	Team	Affiliation	Head coach	Team captain
CIG	Cignal HD Spikers	Cignal TV, Inc.	Michael Cariño	Dexter Clamor
IEM	Instituto Estetico Manila Phoenix Volley Masters	Instituto Estetico Manila	Ernesto Balubar	John Angelo Macalma
PLDT	PLDT Home TVolution-Air Force Power Attackers	Philippine Long Distance Telephone Company	Jasper Jimenez	Dante Alinsunurin
SYS	Systema Active Smashers	Peerless Lion Corporation	Oliver Almadro	André Joseph Pareja
VIA	Via Mare Voyagers	Via Mare Corporation	Vip Isada	Jerrico Hubalde

=== Format ===
Classification round

- The classification round was a double round-robin tournament, with each team playing two matches against all other teams in their pool for a total of eight matches.
- The top two teams advanced to the championship match while the remaining teams were eliminated.

Championship

- The championship was a single-elimination match.

=== Classification round ===
Pos	Team	Pld	W	L	Pts	SW	SL	SR	SPW	SPL	SPR	Qualification
1	PLDT Home TVolution-Air Force Power Attackers	8	8	0	23	24	5	4.800	703	556	1.264	Finals
2	Cignal HD Spikers	8	6	2	16	16	12	1.333	700	690	1.014	Finals
3	Systema Active Smashers	8	3	5	10	15	18	0.833	620	617	1.005	
4	Instituto Estetico Manila Phoenix Volley Masters	8	3	5	10	12	15	0.800	590	607	0.972	
5	Via Mare Voyagers	8	0	8	1	5	24	0.208	683	826	0.827	

Date	Time		Score		Set 1	Set 2	Set 3	Set 4	Set 5	Total	Report
16 May	14:00	Cignal HD Spikers	3–2	Systema Active Smashers	25–14	25–17	17–25	23–25	15–13	105–94	P2
21 May	18:00	Instituto Estetico Manila Phoenix Volley Masters	3–0	Via Mare Voyagers	25–14	25–19	25–21			75–54	P2
25 May	19:00	Cignal HD Spikers	3–1	Via Mare Voyagers	25–19	25–19	28–30	25–22		103–90	P2
28 May	18:00	PLDT Home TVolution–Air Force Power Attackers	3–1	Systema Active Smashers	25–21	25–27	25–15			75–63	P2
1 June	19:00	PLDT Home TVolution–Air Force Power Attackers	3–0	Instituto Estetico Manila Phoenix Volley Masters	25–20	25–20	25–20			75–60	P2
4 June	18:00	PLDT Home TVolution–Air Force Power Attackers	3–1	Cignal HD Spikers	23–25	25–11	25–10	25–14		98–60	P2
8 June	19:00	Systema Active Smashers	3–2	Via Mare Voyagers	25–27	29–27	30–32	25–8	15–7	124–101	P2
11 June	16:00	Systema Active Smashers	3–1	Instituto Estetico Manila Phoenix Volley Masters	25–18	23–25	25–23	25–23		98–89	P2
11 June	18:00	PLDT Home TVolution–Air Force Power Attackers	3–0	Via Mare Voyagers	25–13	25–19	25–21			75–53	P2
15 June	19:00	Cignal HD Spikers	3–2	Instituto Estetico Manila Phoenix Volley Masters	20–25	25–19	22–25	25–15	15–11	107–95	P2
18 June	18:00	PLDT Home TVolution–Air Force Power Attackers	3–0	Instituto Estetico Manila Phoenix Volley Masters	25–17	25–21	25–22			75–60	P2
2 July	16:00	PLDT Home TVolution–Air Force Power Attackers	3–0	Cignal HD Spikers	25–16	25–22	25–20			75–58	P2
2 July	18:00	Systema Active Smashers	3–0	Via Mare Voyagers	25–20	25–11	25–20			75–51	P2
5 July	14:00	Cignal HD Spikers	3–1	Systema Active Smashers	21–25	25–19	25–23	25–23		96–90	P2
9 July	16:00	Systema Active Smashers	0–3	Instituto Estetico Manila Phoenix Volley Masters	23–25	21–25	19–25			63–75	P2
9 July	18:00	Cignal HD Spikers	3–1	Via Mare Voyagers	25–22	19–25	25–20	25–20		94–87	P2
13 July	18:00	PLDT Home TVolution–Air Force Power Attackers	3–1	Via Mare Voyagers	25–19	23–25	27–25	25–18		100–87	P2
20 July	19:00	Instituto Estetico Manila Phoenix Volley Masters	3–0	Via Mare Voyagers	25–17	25–20	25–23			75–60	P2
23 July	16:00	Cignal HD Spikers	3–0	Instituto Estetico Manila Phoenix Volley Masters	25–18	25–22	25–21			75–61	P2
23 July	18:00	PLDT Home TVolution–Air Force Power Attackers	3–2	Systema Active Smashers	18–25	25–22	25–19	22–25	15–9	105–100	P2

==== Finals ====
Date	Time		Score		Set 1	Set 2	Set 3	Set 4	Set 5	Total	Report
26 July	15:30	PLDT Home TVolution–Air Force Power Attackers	3–0	Cignal HD Spikers	0–0	0–0	0–0			0–0	

=== Final standing ===
Rank	Team
1st place, gold medalist(s)	PLDT Home TVolution-Air Force Power Attackers
2nd place, silver medalist(s)	Cignal HD Spikers
3rd place, bronze medalist(s)	Systema Active Smashers
4	Instituto Estetico Manila Phoenix Volley Masters
5	Via Mare Voyagers

2014 Philippine Super Liga All-Filipino Conference
Men's Division Champions
PLDT Home TVolution-Air Force Power Attackers
2nd title

Team roster
2 Alnasip Laja
3 Raffy Mosuela
4 Ron Jay Galang
5 Jeffrey Malabanan
6 Nino Jeruz
7 Rodolfo Labrador
8 Arvin Avila
9 Dante Alinsunurin (c)
10 John Paul Torres
11 Alnakran Abdilla
12 Roberty Boto
14 Jason Ramos
15 Jonathan Tan
17 Jessie Lopez
18 Christian Ian Fernandez

Head coach
Jasper Jimenez

== Awards ==
Award		Men's	Women's
MVP		Alnakran Abdilla (PLDT)	Tina Salak (GEN-PA)
Best Outside Spiker	1st: 2nd:	Alnakran Abdilla (PLDT); Howard Mojica (CIG)	Stephanie Mercado (AIR); Joy Cases (RCC)
Best Middle Blocker	1st: 2nd:	Chris Macasaet (SYS); Alexis Faytaren (IEM)	' Abigail Maraño (AIR); Mary Jean Balse (GEN-PA)
Best Setter		Jessie Lopez (PLDT)	Rhea Dimaculangan (RCC)
Best Opposite Spiker		Gilbert Ablan (CIG)	Suzanne Roces (PLDT)
Best Libero		Raffy Mosuela (PLDT)	Lizlee Ann Pantone (PLDT)

== Venues ==
- Cuneta Astrodome
- University of San Carlos
