= AirAsia Flying Spikers =

Former Filipino professional women's volleyball team

- Full name: AirAsia Flying Spikers
- Short name: AirAsia
- Founded: 2014
- Dissolved: 2014
- Chairman: Dr. Michael L. Romero, Ph.D.
- Manager: Edwin Jeremillo
- Captain: Charleen Abigail Cruz (DLSU)
- League: Philippine Super Liga
- 2014 All-Filipino: 4th place
- Website: Club home page

Uniforms
Home	Away

The AirAsia Flying Spikers was a Philippine women's volleyball team owned by AirAsia Philippines. The team competed in the Philippine Super Liga (PSL) and only participated in one conference: the 2014 All-Filipino Conference, after which the team was acquired by Actimed Inc., creating the Generika Lifesavers.

== Roster ==
For the 2014 PSL All-Filipino Conference:

AirAsia Flying Spikers
No.	Last name	First name	Position	Ht.	Wt.	College	Birth Date
1	Esperanza	Maria Mikaela	Setter	5'5"	50 kg	DLSU	November 8, 1993 (age 32)
2	Maraño	Abigail	Middle Hitter	5'9"	54 kg	DLSU	December 22, 1992 (age 33)
3	Estampa	Royce	Middle Hitter	5'11"	64 kg	USLS	July 7, 1992 (age 34)
4	Mercado	Stephanie	Open Hitter	5'8"	58 kg	DLSU	July 1, 1989 (age 37)
5	Gohing	Melissa	Libero	5'3"	65 kg	DLSU	October 22, 1991 (age 34)
6	Penetrante-Ouano	Maureen	Middle Hitter	5'10"	72 kg	DLSU	August 4, 1983 (age 43)
7	Gumabao	Michele Theresa	Opposite Hitter	5'9"1/2	63 kg	DLSU	September 2, 1992 (age 34)
8	Hingpit	April Ross	Setter	5'5"	59 kg	USLS	January 11, 1989 (age 37)
9	Tiu	Jeushl Wensh	Open Hitter	5'8"	59 kg	DLSU	April 10, 1991 (age 35)
10	Angustia	Arianna May	Middle Hitter	5'10"	59 kg	EAC	April 28, 1992 (age 34)
11	Cruz (c)	Charleen Abigail	Opposite/Outside Hitter	5'8"	60 kg	DLSU	May 11, 1988 (age 38)
12	Sison	Rochelle	Libero	4'11"	46 kg	DLSU	October 10, 1992 (age 34)
14	Macatuno	May Jennifer	Setter	5'3"	58 kg	AdU	May 23, 1991 (age 35)
17	Laborte	Michelle	Opposite/Middle Hitter	5'10"	65 kg	USLS	June 14, 1980 (age 46)

Coaching staff

- Head coach:
  (Philippines) Ramil de Jesus
- Assistant coach(s):
  (Philippines) Noel Orcullo
  (Philippines) Benson Bocboc

Team staff

- Team manager:
  (Philippines) Edwin Jeremillo
- Team Utility:

Medical Staff

- Team Physician:
- Physical Therapist:
  (Philippines) Lace Salimbao

== Honors ==
=== Team ===
Season	Conference	Title	Source
2014	All-Filipino	4th Place	

=== Individual ===
Season	Conference	Award	Name	Source
2014	All-Filipino	1st Best Outside Spiker	(Philippines) Stephanie Mercado	
2014	All-Filipino	1st Best Middle Blocker	(Philippines) Abigail Maraño	

== See also ==
- Shopinas.com Lady Clickers
