= Wensh Tiu =

Filipino volleyball athlete

Personal information
- Full name: Jeushl Wensh Asumbrado Tiu
- Nationality: Filipino
- Born: April 10, 1991 (age 35)
- Home town: Batangas
- Education: De La Salle University
- Height: 5 ft 8 in (1.73 m)
- Weight: 59 kg (130 lb)

Volleyball information
- Position: Open hitter
- Number: 17

Career
- Years: Team
- 2013–14: DLSU Lady Spikers
- 2014–15: AirAsia Flying Spikers
- 2015–16: Generika-Ayala Lifesavers
- 2018–19: Petro Gazz Angels

Jeushl Wensh Asumbrado Tiu (born April 10, 1991) is a Filipino volleyball athlete. She played with the DLSU Lady Spikers of the University Athletic Association of the Philippines (UAAP). She holds a pre-law degree from DLSU and finished Juris Doctor at Far Eastern University.

== Career ==
Tiu was a three-time collegiate champion and was a part of the DLSU Lady Spikers' three-peat in UAAP Season 75. That title was nothing new to her, having led the DLSU Dasmariñas Lady Patriots to several crowns in various leagues including the CHED Palaro, Universities and Colleges Athletic Association, and the National Capital Region Athletic Association during her three years with the team based in Dasmariñas, Cavite.

She was the team captain of the Generika-Ayala Lifesavers in the Philippine Super Liga in 2016.

Tiu's last team as a pro was the Petro Gazz Angels in the Premier Volleyball League (PVL) as she decided to pursue law school at FEU.

== Personal life ==
She passed the bar examinations in 2024.
