= 2017 Premier Volleyball League Reinforced Conference – Men's division =

First men's tournament of the 2017 PVL season

2017 Premier Volleyball League Reinforced Conference
- Duration: April 30 – June 13, 2017
- Teams: 6
- TV partner(s): ABS-CBN Sports and Action

Results
- Champions: Cignal HD Spikers
- Runners-up: Philippine Air Force Air Spikers
- Third place: Philippine Army Troopers
- Fourth place: Sta. Elena Construction Wrecking Balls

Awards
- Conference MVP: Alnakran Abdilla
- Finals MVP: Lorenzo Capate Jr.
- Best OH: Mark Gil Alfafara; Fauzi Ismail
- Best MB: Jayvee Sumagaysay; Gregorio Dolor
- Best OPP: Edward Camposano
- Best Setter: Vince Mangulabnan
- Best Libero: Rence Melgar

PVL Reinforced Conference chronology
- < 2016 (ST) 2018 >

PVL conference chronology
- < 2016 Reinforced (ST) 2017 Open >

The men's division of the 2017 Premier Volleyball League Reinforced Conference was the first conference of the 2017 Premier Volleyball League men's division season. The conference started on April 30, 2017 and concluded on June 13, 2017. All elimination round games were played at the FilOil Flying V Centre in San Juan while the semifinals and Finals games were held at the PhilSports Arena in Pasig.

== Teams ==
2017 Premier Volleyball League Reinforced Conference – Men's division teams
Abbr.	Team	Company	Head coach	Team captain
CLS	Cafe Lupe Sunrisers	Cafe Lupe Hostel & Restaurantbox	John Patrick de Guzman	Ralph Ocampo (Mapúa)
CIG	Cignal HD Spikers	Cignal TV, Inc.	Oliver Allan Almadro	Ysay Marasigan (Ateneo)
IEM	IEM Volley Masters	Instituto Estetico Manila	Ernesto Balubar	Rence Ordoñez (Letran)
PAF	Philippine Air Force Air Spikers	Philippine Air Force	Rhovyl Verayo	Jessie Lopez (FEU)
PAR	Philippine Army Troopers	Philippine Army	Rico de Guzman	Benjaylo Labide (FEU)
STE	Sta. Elena Construction Wrecking Balls	Sta. Elena Construction and Development Corporation	Arnold Laniog	Jan Berlin Paglinawan (NU)

== Format ==
Preliminary round

The six teams compete in a single round-robin tournament, with each team playing one match against all other teams for a total of five matches. The top four teams will advance to the semifinals while the bottom two will be eliminated and ranked 5th through 6th in the final standings.

Semifinals

The top four teams from the preliminary round compete in the semifinals. Teams compete in best-of-three series with the winners advancing to the finals while the losers will compete in the third place series. The match-ups for the semifinals are as follows:

- SF1: PR #1 vs. PR #4
- SF2: PR #2 vs. PR #3

Third place series

The losing teams from the semifinals compete in a best-of-three series to determine which team will finish third in this conference. If the series is tied at 1–1 when the championship is decided, the pool standing procedure will be used (starting from set ratio).

Finals

The winning teams from the semifinals compete in a best-of-three series to determine the conference champions. The losing team in this round will be declared conference runners-up.

== Pool standing procedure ==
Teams are initially ranked by wins followed by match points. A win awards three points if the match lasted for three or four sets (3–0 or 3–1), or two points if the match lasted for five sets (3–2). A loss only awards one point if the match lasted for five sets (2–3).

If multiple teams tie for wins and match points, the next criteria are set ratio (the number of sets won divided by number of sets lost across all matches) and point ratio (the number of points won divided by number of points lost across all matches). If any teams are still tied, the procedure will be applied again, but only considering matches between the remaining tied teams.

== Preliminary round ==
=== Standings ===
Pos	Team	Pld	W	L	Pts	SW	SL	SR	SPW	SPL	SPR	Qualification
1	Philippine Air Force Air Spikers	5	4	1	12	12	3	4.000	367	332	1.105	Semifinals
2	Cignal HD Spikers	5	4	1	11	12	7	1.714	444	388	1.144	Semifinals
3	Sta. Elena Construction Wrecking Balls	5	3	2	8	11	8	1.375	431	403	1.069	Semifinals
4	IEM Volley Masters	5	2	3	7	8	10	0.800	401	407	0.985	Fourth-seed playoff
5	Philippine Army Troopers	5	2	3	6	8	11	0.727	397	424	0.936	Fourth-seed playoff
6	Cafe Lupe Sunrisers	5	0	5	1	3	15	0.200	343	429	0.800	

Rules for classification: 3 points = win match in 3 or 4 sets; 2 points = win match in 5 sets; 1 point = lose match in 5 sets; 0 point = lose match in 3 or 4 sets

=== Match results ===
- All times are in Philippines Standard Time (UTC+08:00)

Date	Time		Score		Set 1	Set 2	Set 3	Set 4	Set 5	Total	Report
Apr 30	10:00	Philippine Army Troopers	3–2	IEM Volley Masters	25–19	23–25	20–25	25–21	16–14	109–104	P2
May 02	13:00	Sta. Elena Construction Wrecking Balls	3–2	Cafe Lupe Sunrisers	21–25	20–25	25–14	25–18	15–12	106–94	P2
May 04	10:00	Philippine Air Force Air Spikers	0–3	Sta. Elena Construction Wrecking Balls	18–25	20–25	22–25	–	–	60–75	P2
May 04	13:00	IEM Volley Masters	0–3	Cignal HD Spikers	19–25	16–25	22–25	–	–	57–75	P2
May 06	09:00	Cafe Lupe Sunrisers	0–3	Philippine Army Troopers	20–25	18–25	19–25	–	–	57–75	
May 09	13:00	Cignal HD Spikers	3–1	Cafe Lupe Sunrisers	23–25	25–19	25–16	25–23	–	98–83	
May 11	13:00	Sta. Elena Construction Wrecking Balls	1–3	IEM Volley Masters	25–22	23–25	26–28	22–25	–	96–100	P2
May 13	13:00	IEM Volley Masters	0–3	Philippine Air Force Air Spikers	23–25	22–25	20–25	–	–	65–75	P2
May 16	13:00	Philippine Army Troopers	2–3	Cignal HD Spikers	27–25	12–25	25–21	17–25	8–15	89–111	P2
May 18	13:00	Philippine Air Force Air Spikers	3–0	Philippine Army Troopers	25–22	25–20	27–25	–	–	77–67	P2
May 20	10:00	Cignal HD Spikers	0–3	Philippine Air Force Air Spikers	28–30	19–25	21–25	–	–	68–80	P2
May 23	13:00	Cafe Lupe Sunrisers	0–3	IEM Volley Masters	14–25	17–25	21–25	–	–	52–75	P2
May 25	10:00	Philippine Air Force Air Spikers	3–0	Cafe Lupe Sunrisers	25–16	25–22	25–19	–	–	75–57	
May 27	13:00	Sta. Elena Construction Wrecking Balls	3–0	Philippine Army Troopers	25–17	25–19	25–21	–	–	75–57	P2
May 30	13:00	Cignal HD Spikers	3–1	Sta. Elena Construction Wrecking Balls	25–14	17–25	25–19	25–21	–	92–79	P2

=== Fourth seed playoff ===
Date	Time		Score		Set 1	Set 2	Set 3	Set 4	Set 5	Total	Report
Jun 01	13:00	Philippine Army Troopers	3–1	IEM Volley Masters	25–16	21–25	25–15	25–23	–	96–79	P2

- Philippine Army Troopers advances to the semifinals round.

== Semifinals ==
- Ranking is based from the preliminary round.
- All series are best-of-3

Semifinals
1	Philippine Air Force Air Spikers	1	3	3
4	Philippine Army Troopers	3	0	2
2	Cignal HD Spikers	1	3	3
3	Sta. Elena Construction Wrecking Balls	3	0	1

Finals
Philippine Air Force Air Spikers	1	2	–
Cignal HD Spikers	3	3	–
3rd place
Philippine Army Troopers	1	3	–
Sta. Elena Construction Wrecking Balls	3	0	–

=== (1) Air Force vs. (4) Army ===
Date	Time		Score		Set 1	Set 2	Set 3	Set 4	Set 5	Total	Report
Jun 03	10:00	Philippine Air Force Air Spikers	1–3	Philippine Army Troopers	23–25	22–25	25–21	20–25	–	90–96	P2
Jun 06	13:00	Philippine Army Troopers	0–3	Philippine Air Force Air Spikers	17–25	18–25	20–25	–	–	55–75	P2
Jun 08	10:00	Philippine Air Force Air Spikers	3–2	Philippine Army Troopers	24–26	21–25	25–20	25–21	15–9	110–101	P2

=== (2) Cignal vs. (3) Sta. Elena ===
Date	Time		Score		Set 1	Set 2	Set 3	Set 4	Set 5	Total	Report
Jun 03	13:00	Cignal HD Spikers	1–3	Sta. Elena Construction Wrecking Balls	20–25	26–24	22–25	28–30	–	96–104	P2
Jun 06	10:00	Sta. Elena Construction Wrecking Balls	0–3	Cignal HD Spikers	17–25	19–25	22–25	–	–	58–75	P2
Jun 08	13:00	Cignal HD Spikers	3–1	Sta. Elena Construction Wrecking Balls	27–25	24–26	25–18	26–24	–	102–93	P2

== Third place series ==
Date	Time		Score		Set 1	Set 2	Set 3	Set 4	Set 5	Total	Report
Jun 10	10:00	Philippine Army Troopers	1–3	Sta. Elena Construction Wrecking Balls	25–18	23–25	22–25	18–25	–	88–93	P2
Jun 13	10:00	Sta. Elena Construction Wrecking Balls	0–3	Philippine Army Troopers	24–26	18–25	19–25	–	–	61–76	P2

== Finals ==
Date	Time		Score		Set 1	Set 2	Set 3	Set 4	Set 5	Total	Report
Jun 10	13:00	Philippine Air Force Air Spikers	1–3	Cignal HD Spikers	25–18	22–25	16–25	19–25	–	82–93	P2
Jun 13	12:00	Cignal HD Spikers	3–2	Philippine Air Force Air Spikers	17–25	27–25	27–25	16–25	15–10	102–110	P2

2017 PVL Reinforced Open Conference
Men's Division champions
Cignal HD Spikers

Team roster
Sandy Montero, Joshua Villanueva, Ralph Diezmo, Bonjomar Castel, Edmar Bonono, Lorenzo Capate Jr., Rex Intal,
Ysay Marasigan (c), Vince Mangulabnan, Mark Gil Alfafara, Peter Torres, Alexis Faytaren, Herschel Ramos
Head coach
(Philippines) Oliver Almadro

== Awards ==
Award		Recipient
MVP	Finals: Conference:	(Philippines) Lorenzo Capate Jr. (Cignal) (Philippines) Alnakran Abdilla (Air Force)
Best Setter		(Philippines) Vince Mangulabnan (Cignal)
Best Outside Spiker	1st: 2nd:	(Philippines) Mark Gil Alfafara (Cignal) (Philippines) Fauzi Ismail (Air Force)
Best Middle Blocker	1st: 2nd:	(Philippines) Jayvee Sumagaysay (Army) (Philippines) Gregorio Dolor (IEM)
Best Opposite Spiker		(Philippines) Edward Camposano (Sta. Elena)
Best Libero		(Philippines) Rence Melgar (IEM)

== Final standings ==
Rank	Team
1st place, gold medalist(s)	Cignal HD Spikers
2nd place, silver medalist(s)	Philippine Air Force Air Spikers
3rd place, bronze medalist(s)	Philippine Army Troopers
4	Sta. Elena Construction Wrecking Balls
5	IEM Volley Masters
6	Cafe Lupe Sunrisers
