= Olivarez =

Olivarez, Olívarez or Olivárez is a Spanish-language surname. Notable people with the surname include:

- Edwin Olivarez (1963), Filipino politician, athlete, and businessman
- Graciela Olivarez (1928–1987), American civil rights lawyer
- José Olivarez, American poet of Mexican descent
- Sebastián Olivarez (1992), Argentine professional footballer
- Vanessa Olivarez (1981), American singer, songwriter and actress

== Other ==
- Olivarez, Texas, a census-designated place
- Olivarez College, in the Philippines

== See also ==
- Olivares (disambiguation)
