= 2016 Spikers' Turf Reinforced Conference =

Third conference of the 2016 SPT season

- Duration: October 1 – November 12, 2016
- Teams: 6

Results
- Champions: Philippine Air Force Air Spikers
- Runners-up: Cignal HD Spikers
- Third place: Champion Supra Smashers
- Fourth place: IEM Phoenix Volley Masters

Awards
- Conference MVP: Howard Mojica
- Finals MVP: Bryan Bagunas
- Best OH: Howard Mojica; Lorenzo Capate
- Best MB: Kheeno Franco; Peter Torres
- Best OPP: Jan Berlin Paglinawan
- Best Setter: Jessie Lopez
- Best Libero: Sandy Montero

Spikers' Turf Reinforced Conference chronology
- < 2015 2017 (PVL) >

Spikers' Turf conference chronology
- < 2016 Collegiate 2017 Reinforced (PVL) >

The 2016 Spikers' Turf Reinforced Conference was the third and final conference of the 2016 season of Spikers' Turf and the second running of the Reinforced Conference. The tournament started on October 1, 2016 and ended on November 12, 2016 with games held at the PhilSports Arena in Pasig. There were six competing teams in this conference.

This would be last tournament under the Spikers' Turf name until the 2018 Open Conference, as the league became the men's division of the upcoming Premier Volleyball League from 2017 to late 2018.

== Teams ==
2016 Spikers' Turf Reinforced Conference
Abbr.	Team	Affiliation
100	100 Plus Active Spikers	100plus
CHA	Champion Supra Smashers	Peerless Products Manufacturing Corporation
CHD	Cignal HD Spikers	Cignal TV, Inc.
IEM	IEM Phoenix Volley Masters	Instituto Estetico Manila
PAF	Philippine Air Force Air Spikers	Philippine Air Force
PAR	Philippine Army Troopers	Philippine Army

== Format ==
Preliminary round

- The preliminary round was a single round-robin tournament, with each team playing one match against all other teams for a total of five matches.
- The top two teams advanced to the semifinals while the bottom two were eliminated.

Semifinals

- The semifinals featured best-of-three series.
- The match-ups were as follows:
  - SF1: #1 vs. #4
  - SF2: #2 vs. #3
- The winners advanced to the championship while the losers would play in the third-place series.

Finals

- The championship and third-place series were best-of-three series.
- The match-ups were as follows:
  - Championship: Semifinal round winners
  - Third-place series: Semifinal round losers

== Pool standing procedure ==
- First, teams are ranked by the number of matches won.
- If the number of matches won is tied, the tied teams are then ranked by match points, wherein:
  - Match won 3–0 or 3–1: 3 match points for the winner, 0 match points for the loser.
  - Match won 3–2: 2 match points for the winner, 1 match point for the loser.
- In case of any further ties, the following criteria shall be used:
  - Set ratio: the number of sets won divided by number of sets lost.
  - Point ratio: number of points scored divided by number of points allowed.
  - Head-to-head standings: any remaining tied teams are ranked based on the results of head-to-head matches involving the teams in question.

== Preliminary round ==
=== Standings ===
Pos	Team	Pld	W	L	Pts	SW	SL	SR	SPW	SPL	SPR	Qualification
1	Philippine Air Force Air Spikers	5	4	1	12	13	5	2.600	436	392	1.112	Final round
2	Cignal HD Spikers	5	4	1	10	13	7	1.857	468	416	1.125	Final round
3	Champion Supra Smashers	5	3	2	11	13	8	1.625	495	455	1.088	Final round
4	IEM Phoenix Volley Masters	5	3	2	7	10	10	1.000	426	443	0.962	Final round
5	Philippine Army Troopers	5	3	2	7	9	11	0.818	422	459	0.919	
6	100 Plus Active Spikers	5	0	5	0	2	15	0.133	337	419	0.804	

=== Match results ===
- All times are in Philippines Standard Time (UTC+08:00)

Date	Time		Score		Set 1	Set 2	Set 3	Set 4	Set 5	Total	Report
Oct 01	12:30	100	0–3	PAF	11–25	16–25	23–25	–	–	50–75	
Oct 03	12:30	CIG	3–0	IEM	25–23	25–20	26–24	–	–	76–67	
Oct 05	12:30	PAR	3–1	100	28–26	25–21	19–25	25–18	–	97–90	
Oct 08	12:30	IEM	3–2	CHA	20–25	25–23	25–23	22–25	15–10	107–106	
Oct 10	12:30	PAF	3–1	CIG	16–25	25–22	25–23	25–23	–	91–93	
Oct 12	12:30	100	3–0	IEM	25–22	25–19	25–23	–	–	75–64	
Oct 15	12:30	CIG	3–2	CHA	25–18	37–35	23–25	17–25	15–12	117–115	
Oct 17	12:30	PAR	0–3	PAF	22–25	25–27	17–25	–	–	64–77	
Oct 19	12:30	CHA	3–1	100	25–22	22–25	25–23	25–14	–	97–84	
Oct 22	12:30	CHA	3–0	PAR	25–13	25–16	25–22	–	–	75–51	
Oct 24	12:30	CIG	3–2	PAR	18–25	21–25	28–26	25–21	15–13	107–110	
Oct 26	12:30	PAF	3–1	IEM	22–25	25–22	25–15	25–21	–	97–83	
Oct 29	12:30	100	0–3	CIG	19–25	14–25	16–25	–	–	49–75	
Nov 02	10:30	CHA	3–1	PAF	25–27	25–22	25–22	27–25	–	102–96	
Nov 02	12:30	IEM	3–2	PAR	25–17	25–23	23–25	22–25	15–10	110–100	

== Bracket ==
- All series are best-of-3

Semifinals
1	Philippine Air Force Air Spikers	3	3
4	IEM Phoenix Volley Masters	1	1
2	Cignal HD Spikers	3	3
3	Champion Supra Smashers	2	0

Finals
Philippine Air Force Air Spikers	3	3
Cignal HD Spikers	2	1
3rd place
Champion Supra Smashers	3	3
IEM Phoenix Volley Masters	1	2

== Semifinals ==
=== Rank 1 vs. Rank 4 ===
Date	Time		Score		Set 1	Set 2	Set 3	Set 4	Set 5	Total	Report
Nov 05	10:30	PAF	3–1	IEM	25–22	23–25	25–23	25–17	–	98–87	
Nov 07	12:30	IEM	1–3	PAF	25–23	16–25	12–25	17–25	–	70–98	

=== Rank 2 vs. Rank 3 ===
Date	Time		Score		Set 1	Set 2	Set 3	Set 4	Set 5	Total	Report
Nov 05	12:30	CIG	3–2	CHA	26–28	25–18	17–25	25–22	16–14	109–107	
Nov 07	10:30	CHA	0–3	CIG	20–25	19–25	20–25	–	–	59–75	

== Third place series ==
Date	Time		Score		Set 1	Set 2	Set 3	Set 4	Set 5	Total	Report
Nov 09	10:30	CHA	3–1	IEM	25–19	25–23	27–29	25–13	–	102–84	
Nov 12	10:30	IEM	2–3	CHA	25–27	28–26	15–25	25–23	11–15	104–116	

== Finals ==
Date	Time		Score		Set 1	Set 2	Set 3	Set 4	Set 5	Total	Report
Nov 09	10:30	PAF	3–2	CIG	25–23	25–19	19–25	25–27	15–12	109–106	
Nov 12	10:30	CIG	1–3	PAF	25–20	21–25	20–25	22–25	–	88–95	

== Awards ==
- Most Valuable Player (Finals)
  - Bryan Bagunas ( Air Force)
- Most Valuable Player (Conference)
  - Howard Mojica ( Air Force)
- Best Setter
  - Jessie Lopez ( Air Force)
- Best Outside Spikers
  - Howard Mojica ( Air Force)
  - Lorenzo Capate ( Cignal)
- Best Middle Blockers
  - Kheeno Franco ( IEM)
  - Peter Torres ( Cignal)
- Best Opposite Spiker
  - Berlin Paglinawan ( Champion)
- Best Libero
  - Sandy Montero ( Cignal)

== Final standings ==
Rank	Team
1st place, gold medalist(s)	Philippine Air Force Air Spikers
2nd place, silver medalist(s)	Cignal HD Spikers
3rd place, bronze medalist(s)	Champion Supra Smashers
4	IEM Phoenix Volley Masters
5	Philippine Army Troopers
6	100 Plus Active Spikers

Spikers' Turf 2nd Season Reinforced Open Conference
Philippine Air Force Air Spikers
2nd title

Team Roster
Jeffrey Malabanan (c), Bryan Bagunas, Raffy Masuela, Howard Mojica, Niño Jerus, Rodolfo Labrador, Arvin Avila, Ruben Inaudito, Fauzi Ismail, Reyson Fuentes, Mike Abria, Pitrus de Ocampo, Rey Carl Dimaculangan, Jessie Lopez, Edwin Tolentino, Mark Alfafara
Rhovyl Verayo (Head Coach), Dante Alinsunurin (Asst. Coach)

Note:
(c) - Team Captain
(L) - Libero
