= Sta. Elena Construction Wrecking Balls =

Volleyball Team

- Full name: Sta. Elena Construction Wrecking Balls (Team Volleyball Manila)
- Short name: Sta. Elena Construction
- Founded: 2013
- History: Team Volleyball Manila; 2013–present Systema Active Smashers; 2013–2014; Champion Infinity Active Smashers; 2015; Sta. Elena Construction Wrecking Balls; 2015–2016, 2017–2018; Champion Supra Smashers; 2016
- Manager: Sammy Gaddi
- Captain: Ave Joshua Retamar (NU)
- League: Spikers' Turf; Philippine Super Liga (PSL)
- 2019 Reinforced: 4th place
- Website: Club home page

Uniforms
Home	Away

The Sta. Elena Construction Wrecking Balls were a men's volleyball team in the Philippines owned by Sta. Elena Construction & Development Corporation. The team was established in 2013 and first played in the Philippine Super Liga until 2014. Later that year, the team moved to the Sports Vision umbrella, competing in Spikers' Turf and the men's division of the Premier Volleyball League.

While Sta. Elena no longer operates its own team, it has sponsored the NU Bulldogs in Spikers' Turf from 2018 to 2023.

== History ==
The team debuted in the Philippine Superliga (PSL) as the Systema Active Smashers (under the sponsorship of Peerless Products Manufacturing Corporation), playing as one of the pioneer teams in the men's division. The team also participated in the inaugural men's conference of the Shakey's V-League (the precursor of the Spikers' Turf). In 2015, the team was renamed the Champion Infinity Active Smashers and became one of the pioneer teams of the Spikers' Turf, the male counterpart of the Shakey's V-League.

In September 2015, Sta. Elena Construction & Development Corporation took over sponsorship of the team and played as the Sta. Elena Construction Wrecking Balls. In October 2016, the team was renamed the Champion Supra Smashers with the return of Peerless Products Manufacturing Corporation as its sponsor.

In 2017, Sta. Elena Construction & Development Corporation returned as its sponsor.

== Honors ==
=== Team ===
Premier Volleyball League/spikers' Turf:

Season	Conference	Title	Source
2014	Reinforced	Runner-up	
2015	Open	6th place	
2015	Reinforced	6th place	
2016	Open	3rd Place	
2016	Reinforced Open	3rd Place	
2017	Reinforced	4th place	
2017	Open	4th place	

Philippine Super Liga:

Season	Conference	Title	Source
2013	Grand Prix	Runner Up	
2014	All-Filipino	3rd Place	
2014	Grand Prix	5th place	

NOTE: Played as Team Volleyball Manila (TVM).

Others:

Season	Tournament	Title	Source
2014	POC-PSC Philippine National Games	3rd place	

=== Individual ===
Spikers' Turf / Premier Volleyball League:

Season	Conference	Award	Name	Source
2014	Reinforced	Best Scorer	(Philippines) Salvador Depante	
2014	Reinforced	Best Blocker	(Philippines) Rocky Honrade	
2016	Open	Best Libero	(Philippines) Juvie Mangaring	
2016	Reinforced	Best Opposite Spiker	(Philippines) Berlin Paglinawan	
2017	Reinforced	Best Opposite Spiker	(Philippines) Edward Camposano	
2017	Open	2nd Best Outside Spiker	(Philippines) Isaah Arda	
2017	Open	Best Opposite Spiker	(Philippines) Berlin Panglinawan	

Philippine Super Liga:

Season	Conference	Award	Name	Source
2013	Grand Prix	1st Best Middle Blocker	(Philippines) AJ Pareja	
2013	Grand Prix	2nd Best Middle Blocker	(Philippines) Rocky Honrade	
2014	All-Filipino	1st Best Middle Blocker	(Philippines) Chris Macasaet	

Others:

Season	Tournament	Award	Name	Source
2014	POC-PSC Philippine National Games	Best Blocker	(Philippines) AJ Pareja	

== Team captains ==
- (Philippines) Renz Ordoñez (2013)
- (Philippines) AJ Pareja (2014)
- (Philippines) Chris Macasaet (2014 - 2014)
- (Philippines) Sylvester Honrade (2015- 2016)
- (Philippines) Jan Berlin Paglinawan (2016 – 2017)
