= Gamboa Coffee Spikers =

Philippine professional volleyball team

- Short name: GCM
- Nickname: Coffee Spikers
- Founded: 2017
- Dissolved: 2017
- Captain: Sam Damian
- League: Premier Volleyball League
- 2017 Open: 7th place

Uniforms
Home	Away

The Gamboa Coffee Spikers were a men's volleyball team in the Philippines owned by Universal Knowledge DermPharma. The team competed in the men's division of the Premier Volleyball League and took part in just one conference: the 2017 Open Conference.

== Honors ==
=== Team ===
Premier Volleyball League

Season	Conference	Title	Source
2017	Open	7th place	
