= Mandaluyong =

Highly urbanized city in Metro Manila, Philippines

- Highly urbanized city
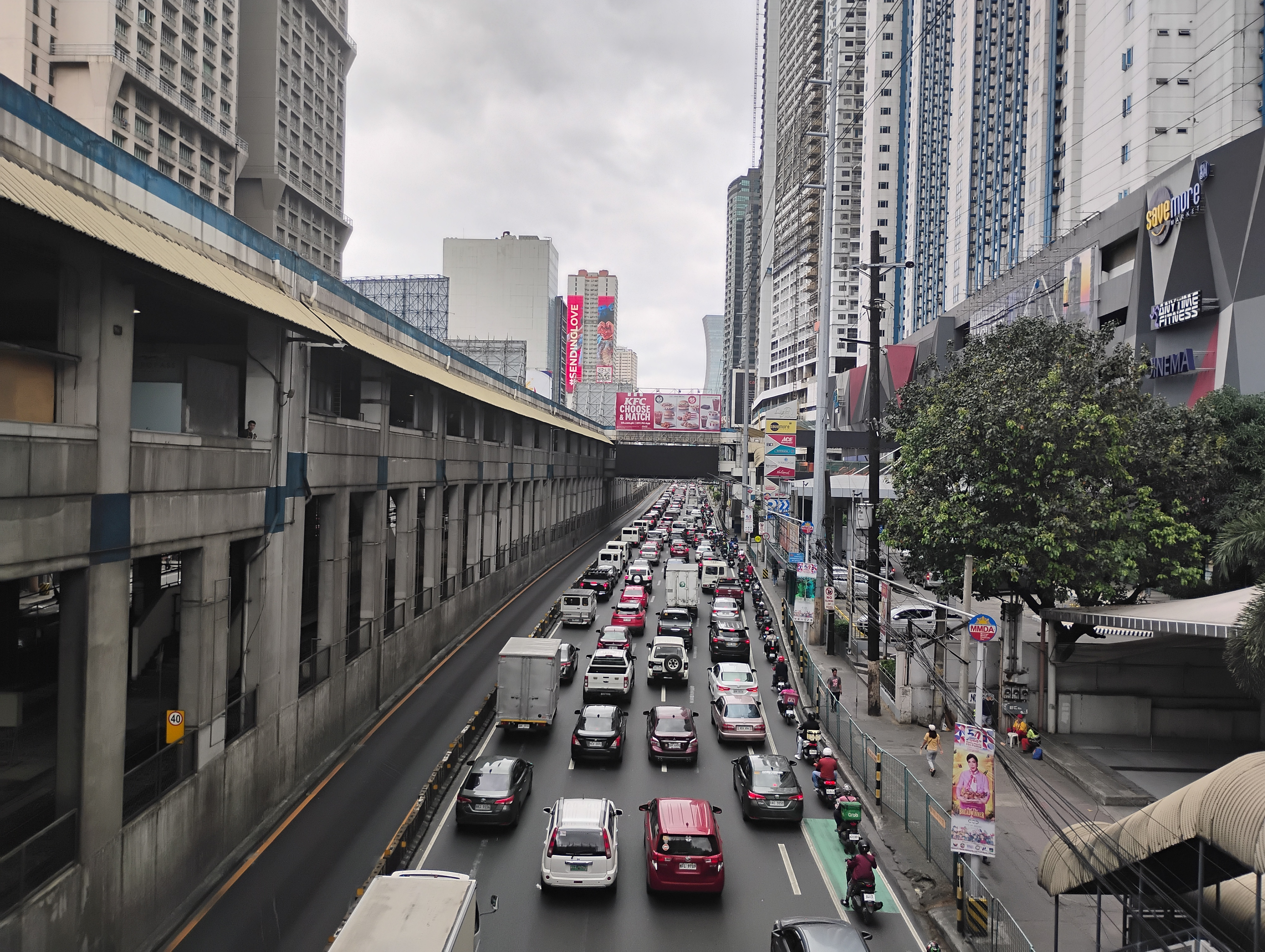
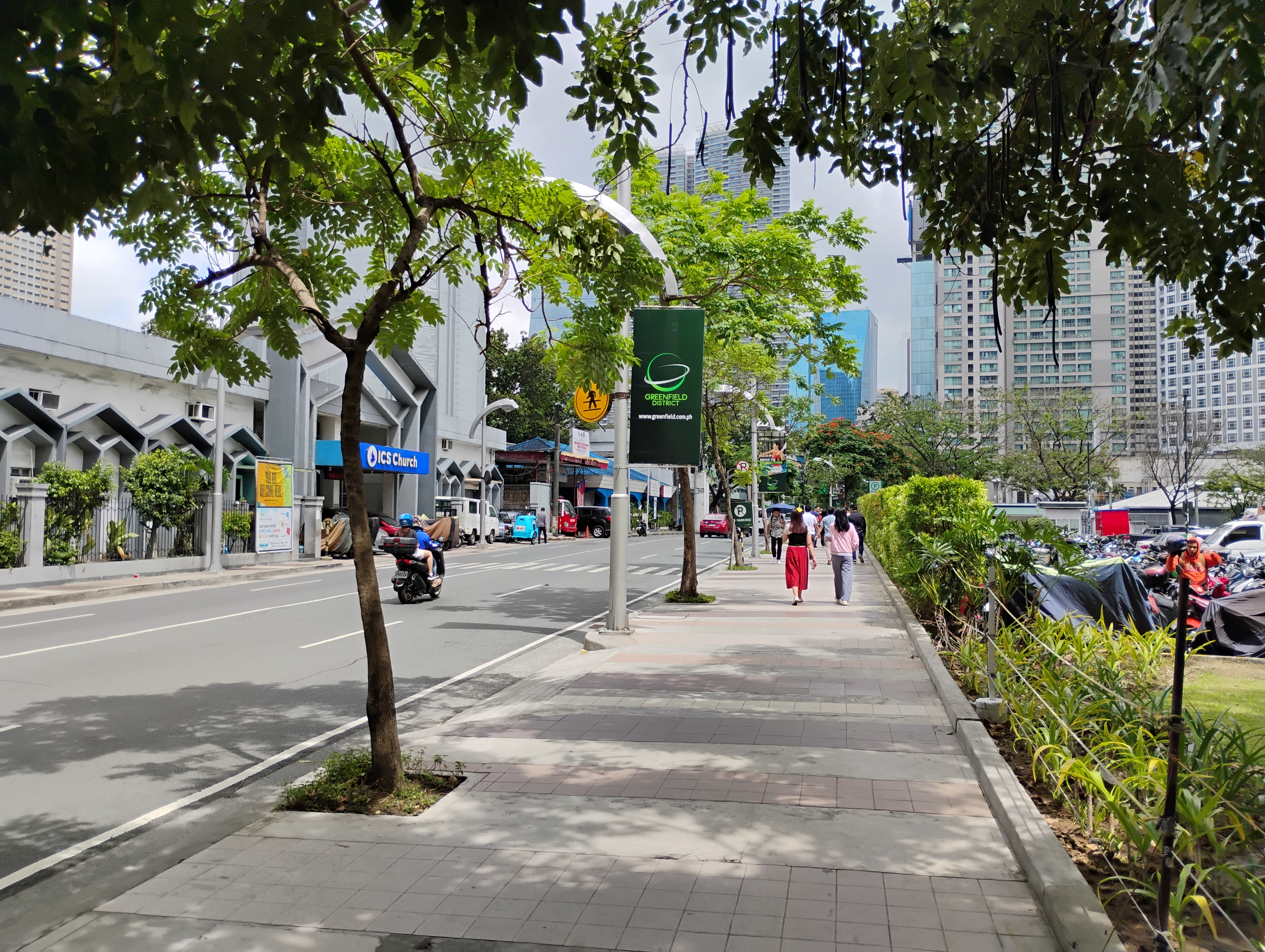
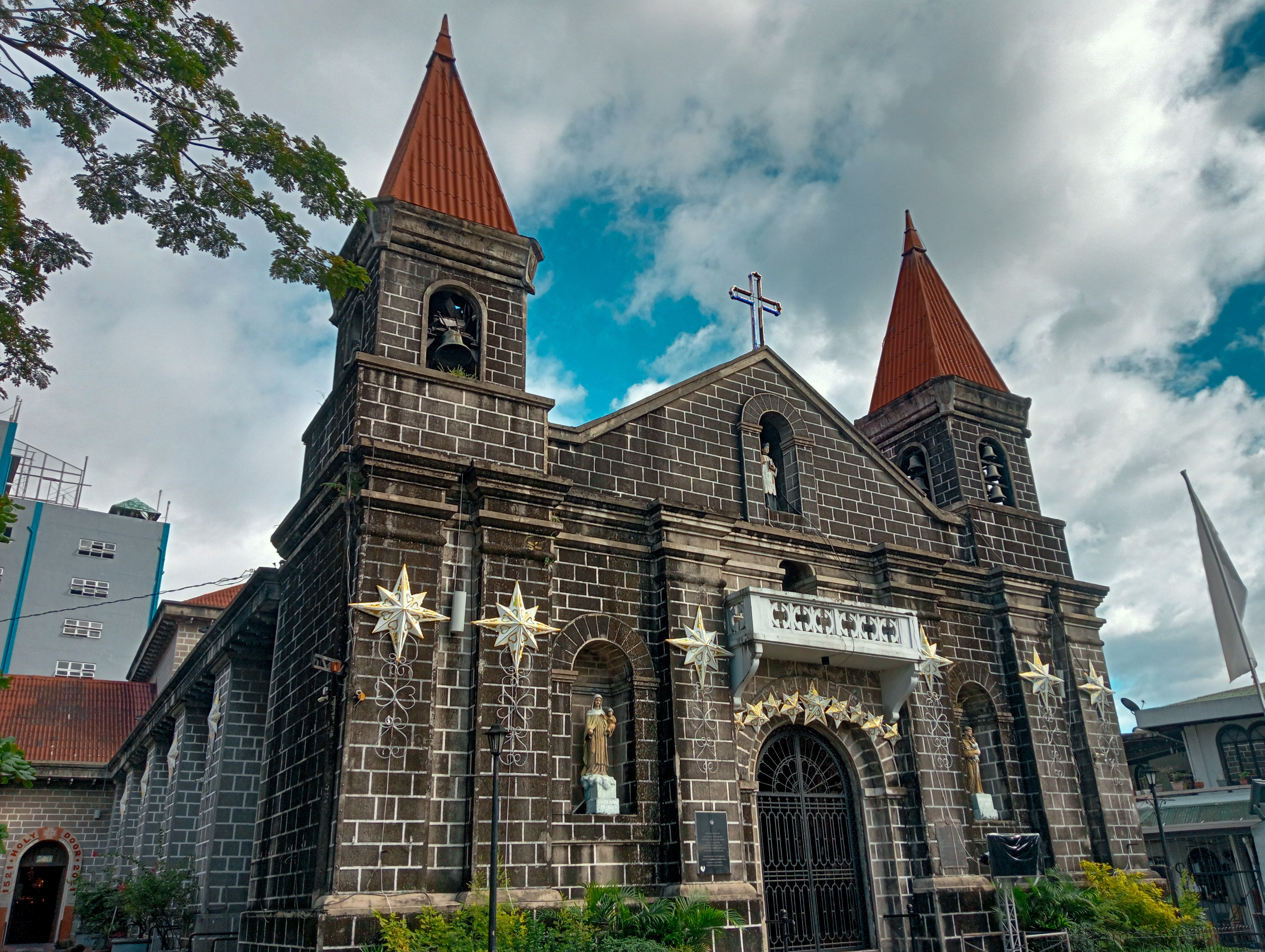
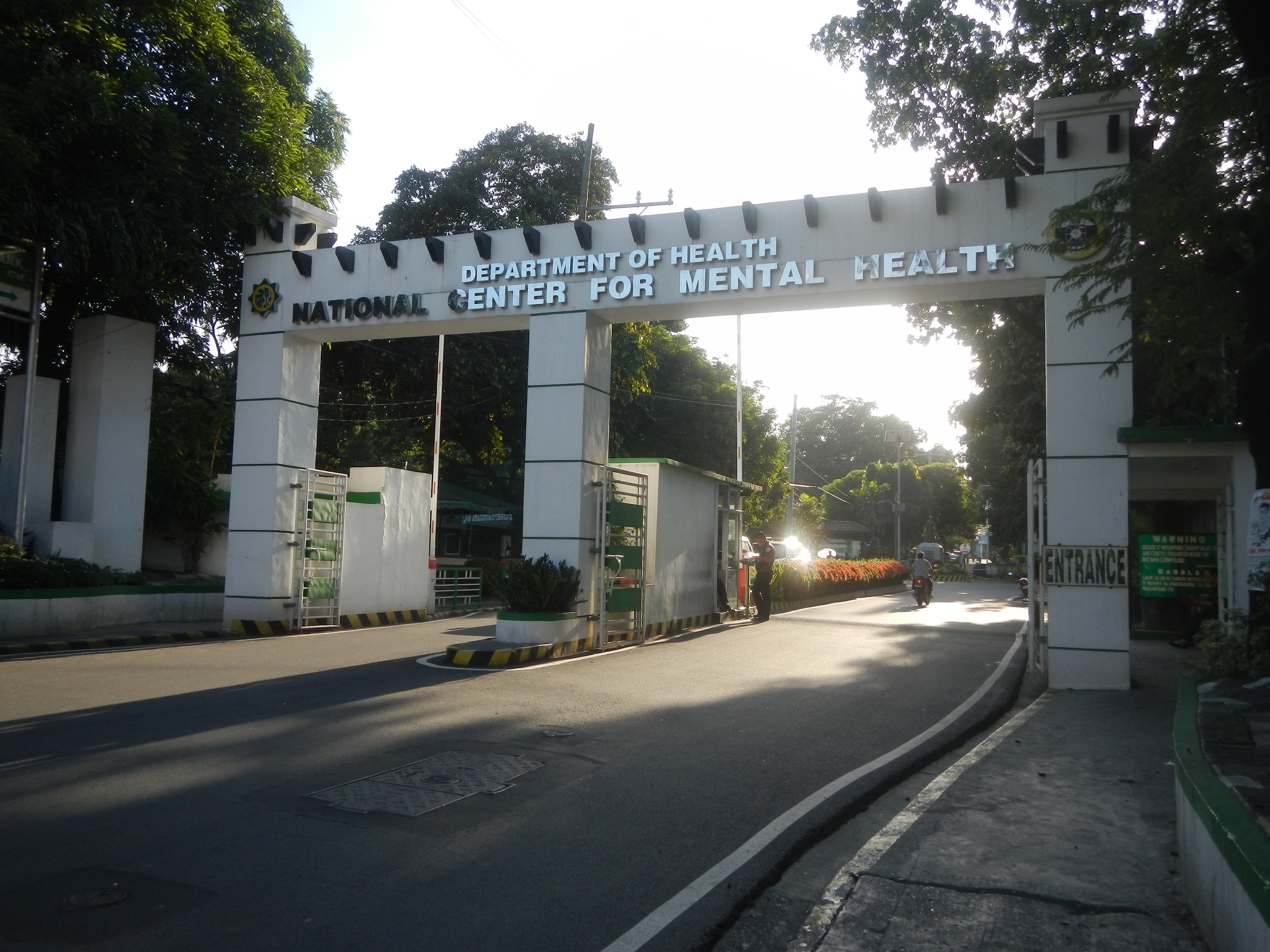
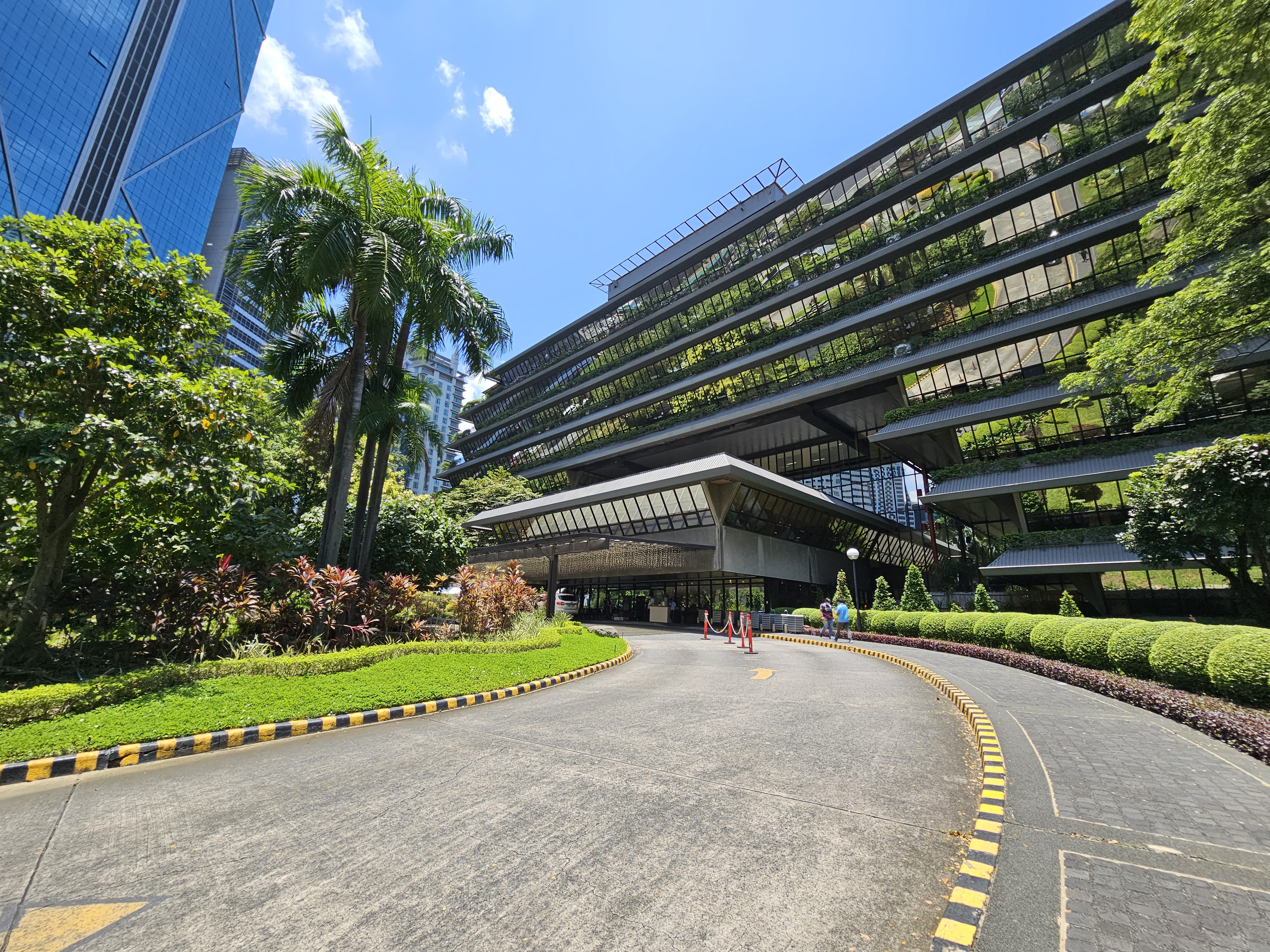
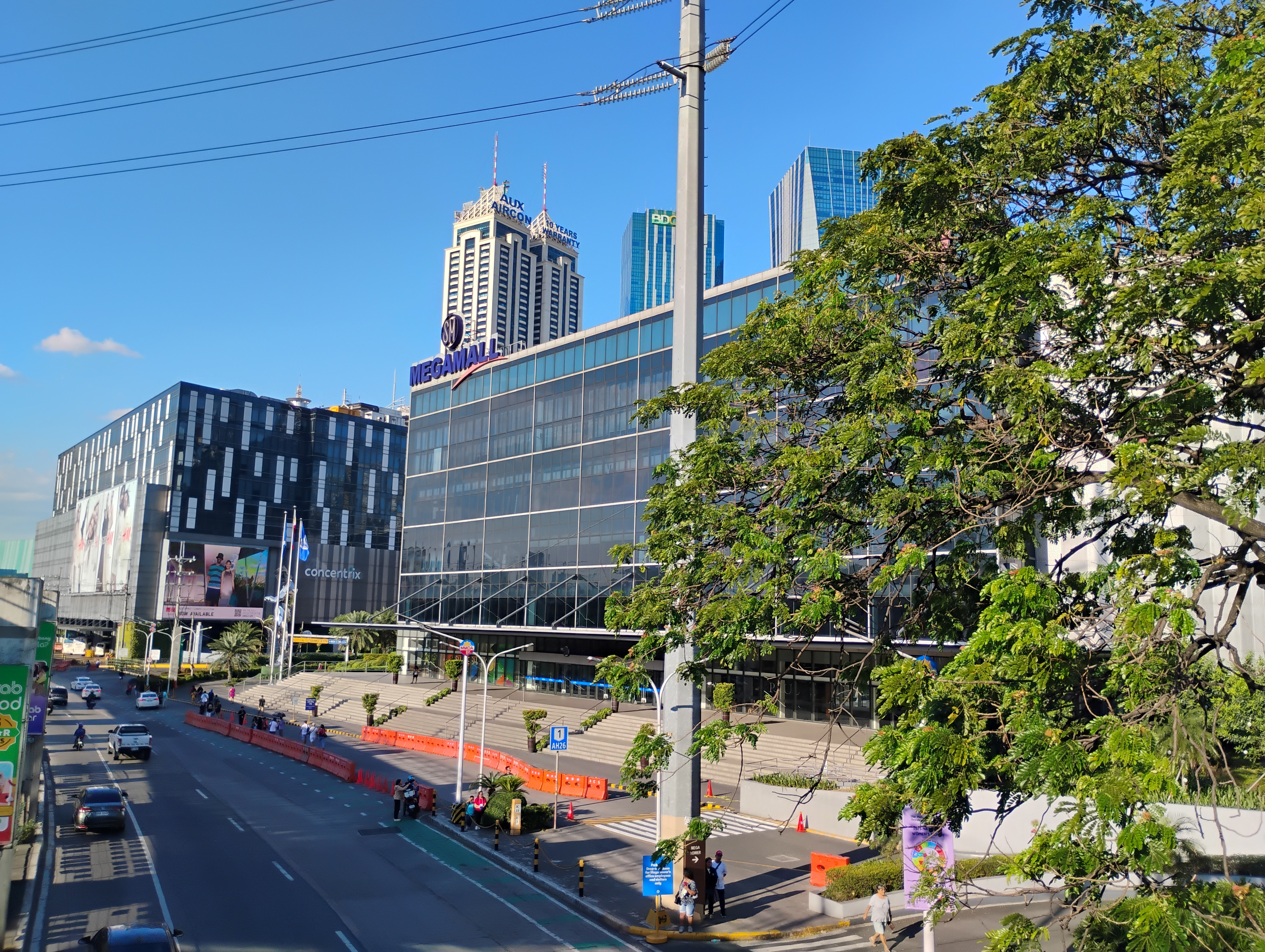
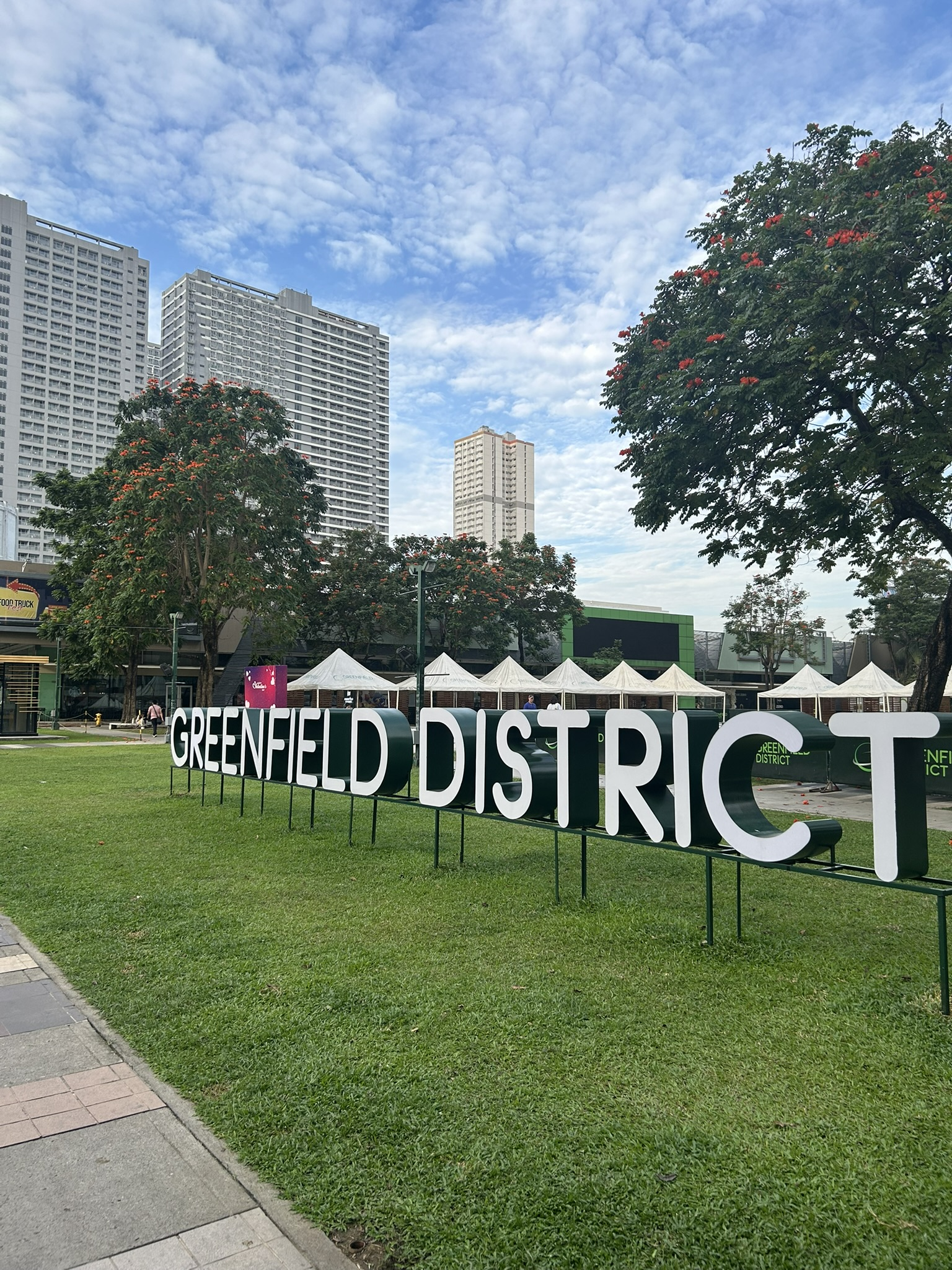
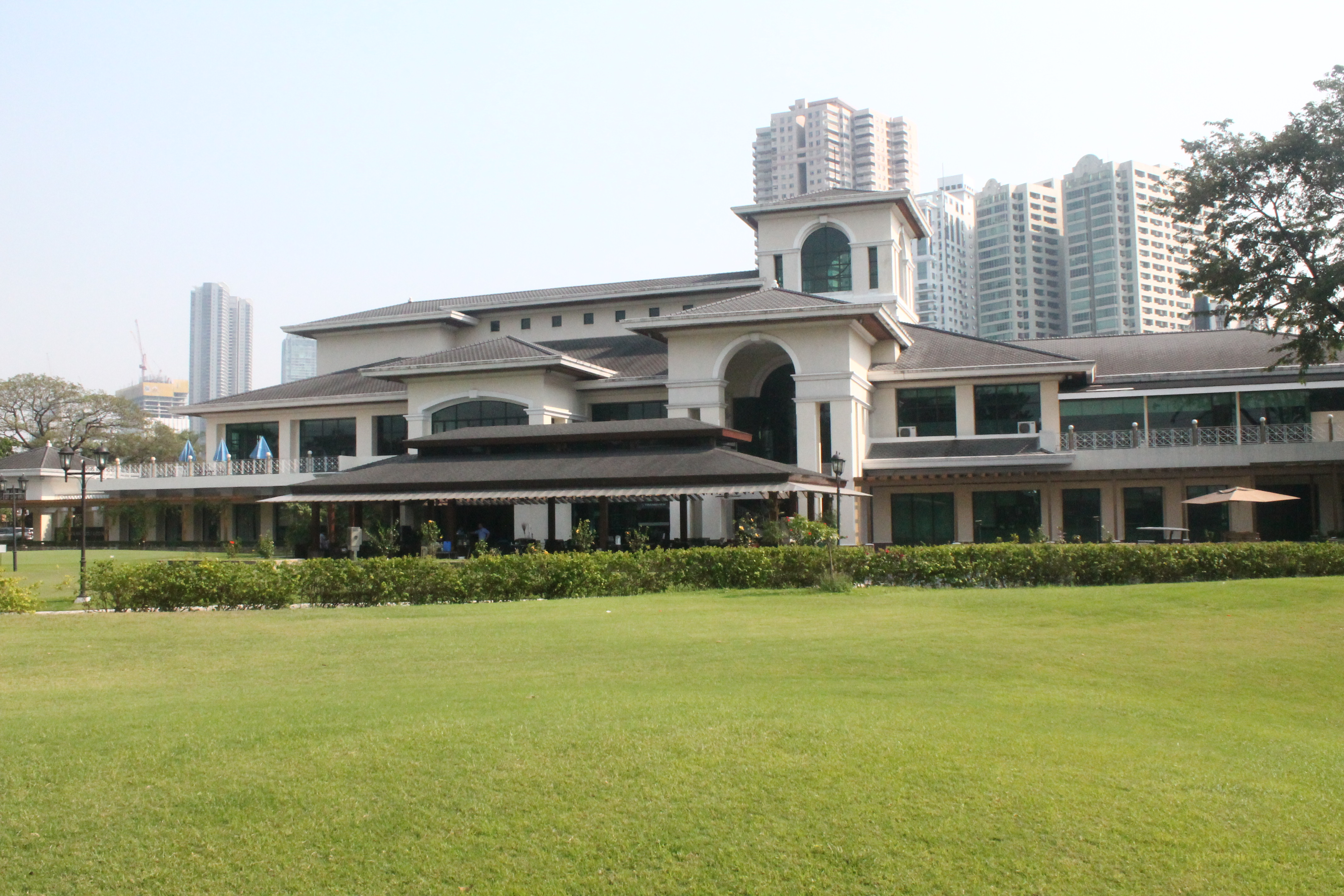
- EDSA Northbound Greenfield District Mandaluyong City Hall San Felipe Neri Parish Church National Center for Mental Health SMC Headquarters SM Megamall Greenfield District Wack Wack Golf and Country Club

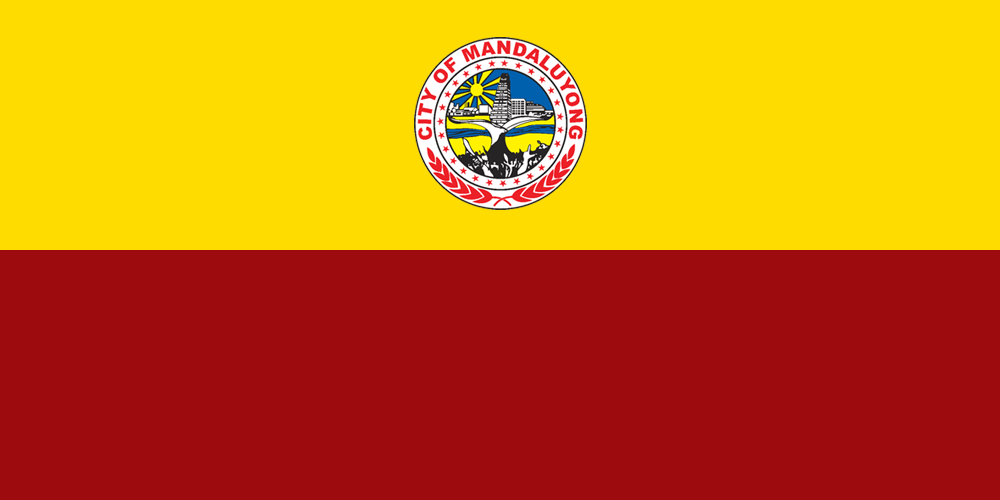
- Flag Seal
- Nicknames: Tiger City of the Philippines, Shopping Capital of the Philippines
- Motto(s): Gawa, hindi salita! English: "Action, not words!"
- Anthem: Martsa ng Mandaluyong; English: Mandaluyong March
- Map of Metro Manila with Mandaluyong highlighted
- Interactive map of Mandaluyong
- Location within the Philippines
- Coordinates: 14°35′N 121°02′E
- Country: Philippines
- Region: National Capital Region
- District: Lone district
- Founded: 1841
- Chartered: March 27, 1907
- Renamed: November 6, 1931 (as Mandaluyong)
- Cityhood and HUC: February 9, 1994
- Barangays: 27 (see Barangays)

Government
  - Type: Sangguniang Panlungsod
  - Mayor: Carmelita Abalos (PFP)
  - Vice Mayor: Antonio D. Suva Jr. (PFP)
  - Representative: Alexandria P. Gonzales (NUP)
  - Councilors: List: 1st District; Charisse Marie A. Aguilar-Vargas; Anjelo Elton P. Yap; Danilo L. De Guzman; Carissa Mariz S. Manalo; Grace Marie V. Antonio; Estanislao V. Alim III; 2nd District; Benjamin A. Abalos III; Alexander C. Sta. Maria; Michael Eric G. Cuejilo; Fernando S. Ocampo; Reginald S. Antiojo; Leslie F. Cruz; ABC President; Darwin Fernandez; SK Federation President; Aeron Sedrick Mangaliag
  - Electorate: 223,624 voters (2025)

Area
  - Total: 11.26 km^{2} (4.35 sq mi)
- Elevation: 32 m (105 ft)
- Highest elevation: 592 m (1,942 ft)
- Lowest elevation: −2 m (−6.6 ft)

Population (2024 census)
  - Total: 465,902
  - Density: 41,380/km^{2} (107,200/sq mi)
  - Households: 116,954
- Demonym: Mandaleño

Economy
  - Income class: 1st city income class
  - Poverty incidence: 0.5% (2023)
  - Revenue: ₱ 9,277 million (2025)
  - Assets: ₱ 34,591 million (2025)
  - Expenditure: ₱ 8,069 million (2025)

Service provider
  - Electricity: Manila Electric Company (Meralco)
- Time zone: UTC+8 (PST)
- PSGC: 1380500000
- IDD : area code: +63 (0)02
- Native languages: Filipino
- Major religions: Roman Catholic
- Feast date: May 26
- Catholic diocese: Roman Catholic Archdiocese of Manila
- Patron saint: Saint Philip Neri Immaculate Conception
- Website: mandaluyong.gov.ph

Mandaluyong (/məndɑːˈlujɒŋ/ mən-dah-LOO-yong; Tagalog pronunciation: [mɐndɐˈlujoŋ]), officially the City of Mandaluyong (Filipino: Lungsod ng Mandaluyong, Tagalog pronunciation: [luŋˈsod nɐŋ mɐndɐˈlujoŋ]), is a highly urbanized city in the National Capital Region of the Philippines. According to the 2024 census, it has a population of 465,902 people.

Located directly east of Manila, Mandaluyong was originally the barrio of San Felipe Neri under the jurisdiction of Santa Ana de Sapa. It became a separate municipality within the province of Tondo (later Manila) in 1841 and was annexed to the province of Rizal in 1901, briefly serving as the latter's provincial capital in 1904. The municipality was officially renamed Mandaluyong in 1931 during the American colonial period and became part of the City of Greater Manila from 1942 to 1945 and finally Metro Manila upon the region's establishment in 1975. It was granted cityhood in 1994, becoming the first municipality in Metro Manila to be converted into a city since the region's establishment.

Mandaluyong is home to part of Ortigas Center, one of Metro Manila's principal central business districts, which it shares with Pasig. It is also the site of the headquarters of the Asian Development Bank, Banco de Oro, and San Miguel Corporation. The city is bordered by Manila, San Juan, Quezon City, Pasig, Taguig, and Makati, and is the fourth-smallest city in the Philippines by land area, covering 11.26 km^{2} (4.35 sq mi).

== Etymology ==
There are different stories on the origin of the name Mandaluyong.

One tells of how the place was abundant with a kind of tree called luyong, now more commonly known as anahaw (Saribus rotundifolius), from which canes and furniture were made.

Another claims that the Spaniards named the place based on the report of a navigator named Acapulco, who saw the rolling hills frequently being lashed at by daluyong (“big waves from the sea”). This seems to confirm traditional pre-Hispanic stories that giant waves from the sea would meet the adjoining hills of the vast lowland, referred to as salpukan ng alon. Felix dela Huerta, a Franciscan historian, observed that the rolling topography of this land resembled giant waves of the sea.

As with the etymological legends of many Philippine places, when the foreigners asked what the place was called, the locals answered with the description "madaluyong" ("undulating"), later transcribed by Spanish writers as "Mandaluyong," with the addition of an “n”.

Another version of the name is based on a legend that a Maharlika named Luyong fell in love with Manda, the lovely daughter of a barangay chieftain. The chieftain did not like Luyong and forbade him Manda's hand. Luyong overcame this objection by winning a series of tribal contests, as was the custom at the time. The couple settled thereafter in a place which was later called “Mandaluyong" – a term made up of joining their names.

== History ==
=== Early history ===
Natives of Mandaluyong trace their roots to Emperor Soledan (also known as "Anka Widyaya" of the Great Majapahit Empire) and Empress Sasaban of the Kingdom of Sapa, whose son Prince Balagtas ruled as sovereign of the kingdom in about the year 1300.

More than a century later, in about the year 1470, it expanded and was called the "Kingdom of Namayan" with "Lakan Takhan" as sovereign. The vast Kingdom comprised what are now Quiapo, San Miguel, Sta, Mesa, Paco, Pandacan, Malate and Santa Ana in Manila, and Mandaluyong, San Juan, Makati, Pasay, Pateros, Taguig and Parañaque.

=== Spanish colonial era ===
==== Foundation ====
Mandaluyong was first known as a barrio of Santa Ana de Sapa, which was part of the District of Paco, Province of Tondo (later known as the Province of Manila). It was named San Felipe Neri by the Spaniards in honor of the patron saint of Rome. It was separated civilly from Santa Ana de Sapa in 1841.

On September 15, 1863, San Felipe Neri established its own parish. Under the administration of the Congregation “Dulcísimo Nombre de Jesús” (lit. transl. Sweet Name of Jesus), it constructed its own church, convent and school. The Parish of San Felipe Neri played a significant role as a relay station for propagating the Katipunan during the 1896–1898 Revolution.

==== Original barrios ====
In 1829, the then-barrio of Mandaloyon had 10 barangays, each named after saints: San Pedro Bautista, San Roque, San Pascual, San Antonio, San Francisco, San Pedro Apostol, San Miguel, San Rafael, San Pedro Alcantara, and San Isidro. By 1840, there were a total of 14 barangays, and in 1845, when Mandaluyong became a separate pueblo, there were 17 barangays. This would increase to 28 barangays in 1864, until the early 1880s where the practice of naming barangays after saints were dropped and the number of barangays (which was changed to barrios) was reduced to ten: Poblacion, Buhangin, Licod Hacienda, Hagdanbato, Pasobancal, Barranca, Jolo, Punta, Santo Nino, and Zaniga.

During the American colonial era, the first recorded census in 1903 listed five barrios: Poblacion, Barangka, Hagdang Bato, Namayan, and Hulo. From these five evolved 22 sub-barrios.

==== The Philippine revolution ====
Mandaluyong was significant in the Philippine Revolution of 1896 as the baluarte (territory) of the Katipunan or "Makabuhay" group, with seventeen branches.

On August 29, 1896, Andres Bonifacio, together with Emilio Jacinto and other members of the Katipunan went into the house of Romualdo Vicencio at Sitio Balakbak (now Villa San Miguel) to prepare for the upcoming revolution against Spanish authority. In this site, Bonifacio read the last manifestation of the Katipunan before they transferred in Hagdan Bato, in the house of Felix Sanchez. This event is also known as the "29 De Agosto" and "Pinagtipunan" in which it is already named in two streets near the historic Barangay Hagdan Bato Itaas. It was in Barangay Hagdang Bato on August 28, 1896, where Andres Bonifacio issued a proclamation setting Saturday, August 29, 1896, as the date of the attack on Manila.

On August 30, 1896, after the successfully revolution in San Felipe Neri, the Katipuneros went to San Juan del Monte and attacked the El Polvorin (gunpowder depot) in order to amass more weapons to use against the Spaniards. This event is popularly known as the Battle of San Juan del Monte. It was also in this town that the revolutionary paper, La Republika, was established on September 15, 1896.

=== American colonial era ===
On June 11, 1901, San Felipe Neri was incorporated into the newly established province of Rizal. During the American Occupation, it was raised to a first-class municipality with five barrios, namely: Poblacion, Barangka, Hagdang Bato, Namayan and Hulo. By virtue of Act No. 942 dated November 6, 1903, it was consolidated with the municipality of San Juan del Monte and became the seat of the municipal government. For several months in 1904, San Felipe Neri became the capital of Rizal. San Juan del Monte was later separated from San Felipe Neri to regain its independent municipality status on March 27, 1907.

San Felipe Neri was renamed to its present name of Mandaluyong on November 6, 1931, by virtue of Act No. 3836. Many government infrastructures are established during the American Period, including the Correctional Institute for Women, Welfareville Compound, The Boy's Town, and the National Center for Mental Health.

=== Japanese occupation era ===
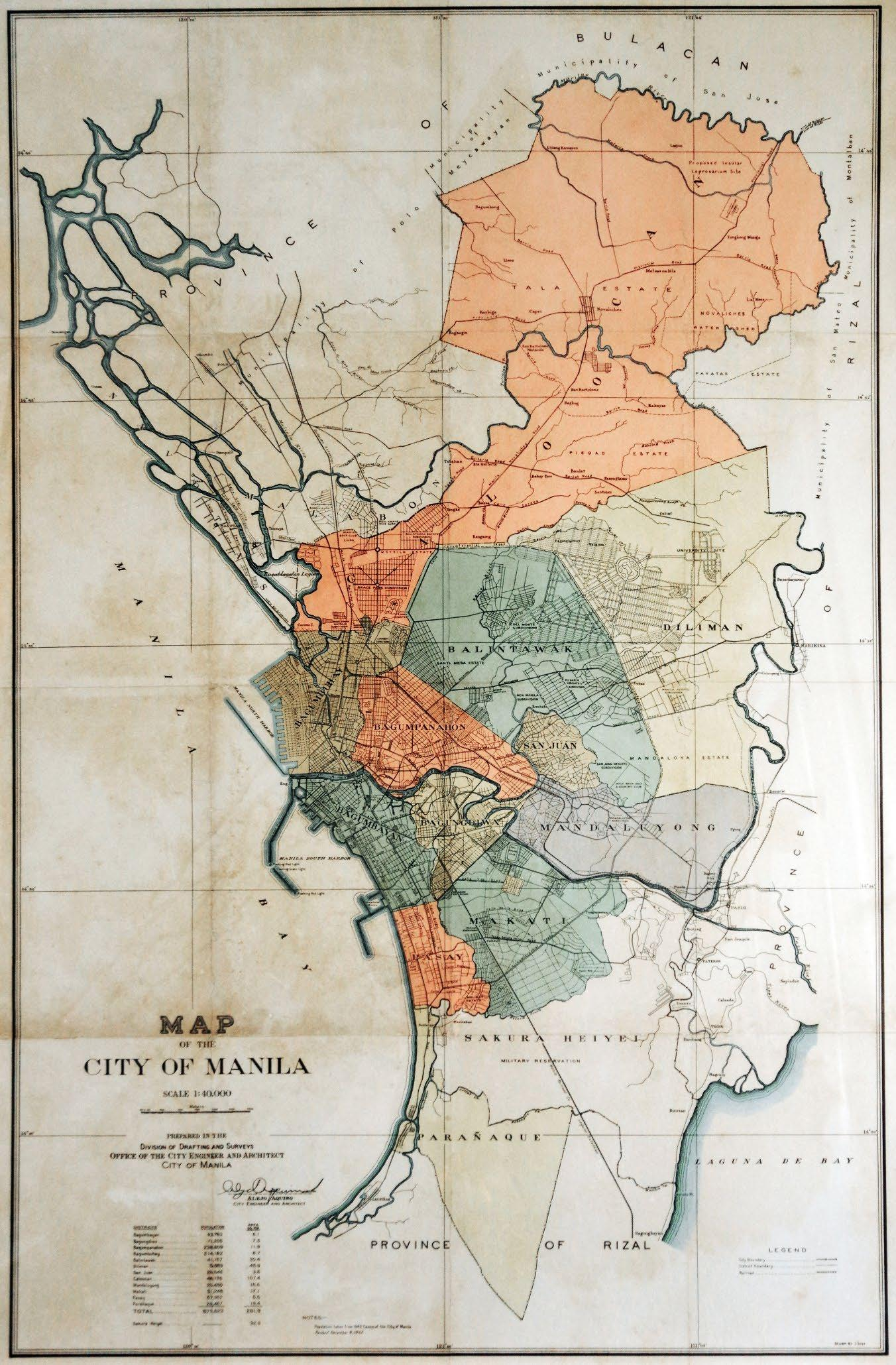
Map of the City of Greater Manila, showing Mandaluyong's territory that reached up to Marikina River at the east.

From 1942 to 1945, during World War II, Mandaluyong formed part of the City of Greater Manila, along with Manila, Quezon City, and other nearby towns of Rizal. Also during the war, Mandaluyong lost many of her people; among them were Catholic priests and civilians. Destruction was felt all over, but with the timely arrival of the American Liberation Forces and the Philippine Commonwealth troops on February 9, 1945, the municipality was saved from further damages. That day became a red calendar day for Mandaluyong marking its liberation from the Japanese Imperial forces by the Allies.

=== Philippine independence ===
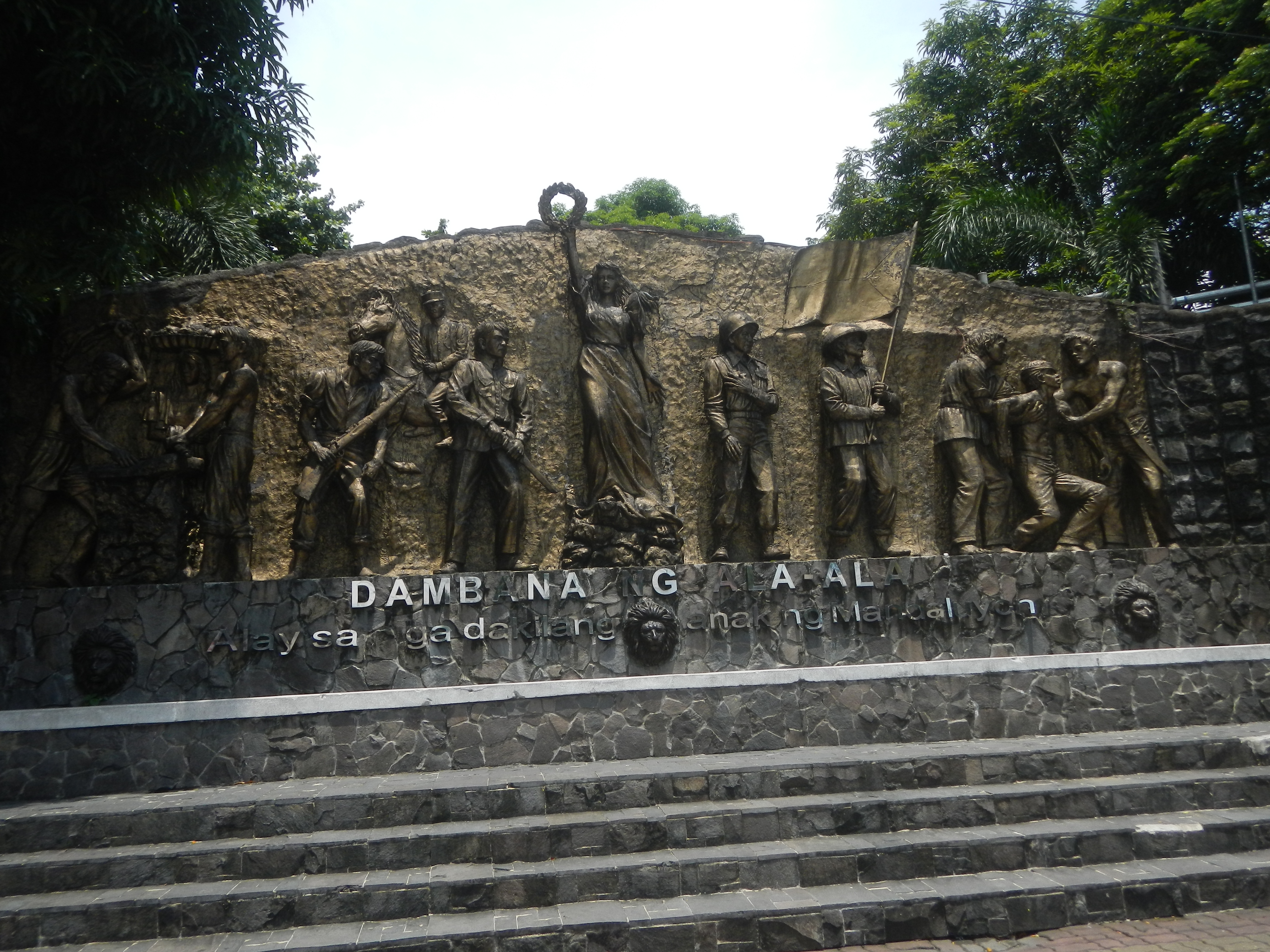
Dambana ng Ala-ala Alay sa mga Dakilang Anak ng Mandaluyong (lit. transl. Shrine of Remembrance Offering to the Great Sons of Mandaluyong), a memorial dedicated to the gallant locals of Mandaluyong

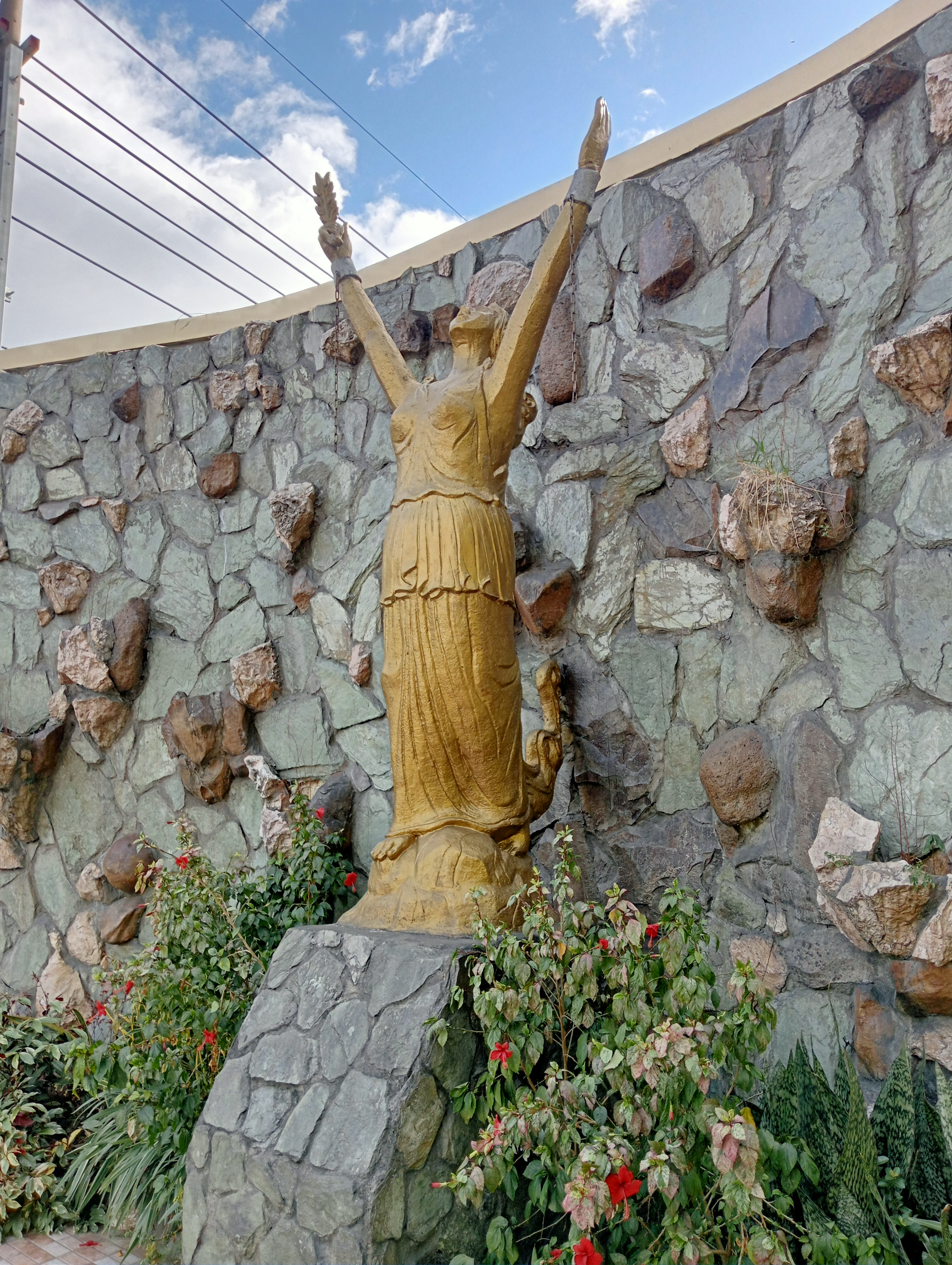
Liberation Monument at Liberation Park, Pag-asa, Mandaluyong

After World War II, Mandaluyong began to become progressive and dramatically increase the economy. Many infrastructures, companies, and other businesses were developed in 1950s–1960s and as the result, making Mandaluyong recognized as the most developed municipality in the province of Rizal.

In 1967, actor and Mandaluyong native Pancho Magalona ran for governor of Rizal under the Liberal Party, but was defeated by incumbent Nacionalista governor Isidro Rodriguez from Montalban (now Rodriguez).

In May 1970, the Mandaluyong-based textile firm Continental Manufacturing Corporation of Rufino Deeunhong and his son Dewey Dee began exporting Vonnel yarn to both the Middle East and West Germany with the cooperation of Mitsubishi Corporation (owner of the Vonnel brand), which was credited as the first time a Philippine-manufactured good was exported to the Middle East.

==== The martial law era ====
===== Ambush of Juan Ponce Enrile =====
Mandaluyong played a small part in Ferdinand Marcos' efforts to rationalize his declaration of Martial law because the alleged 1972 ambush of Juan Ponce Enrile took place in Wack Wack Village, an exclusive neighborhood in Mandaluyong, in the hours immediately preceding its implementation. Because the alleged ambush took place in an exclusive subdivision, no independent eyewitnesses of the event have come forward, and witnesses of the immediate aftermath are few. This has lent credence to accounts which say that the ambush was faked, and that the site was selected specifically because it was easy to stage the incident there. The 14-year period which followed that night is remembered for the Marcos administration's record of human rights abuses, particularly targeting political opponents, student activists, journalists, religious workers, farmers, and others who fought against the Marcos dictatorship.

===== Industrial growth and government takeover efforts =====
A prominent figure in Philippine business before Martial Law was Mandaluyong-based industrialist Domingo M. Guevarra Sr., whose success began when he created Radiowealth, a brand of affordable Philippine-made appliances including radios and televisions. This eventually became the Mandaluyong-based Guevara Enterprises which dominated the fields of electronics, communications, agriculture and industrial development, transportation, and manufacturing in the Philippines, whose headquarters was on Libertad (now D.M. Guevara). National Artist Nick Joaquin noted that Guevara's projects - which included the manufacturing the "Sakbayan," which was the ever first Philippine-made car - brought the Philippine economy to the verge of Newly Industrialized Country status in the years before Martial Law. However, the growth of Guevara's businesses stopped when he refused to surrender control of his businesses to President Ferdinand Marcos during Martial Law, and Marcos retaliated by making it difficult for Guevara to do business.

===== Separation from Rizal province =====
On November 7, 1975, Mandaluyong was formally included in newly established Metropolitan Manila by virtue of Presidential Decree No. 824 signed by President Ferdinand Marcos.

=== Cityhood ===
By virtue of the 1987 Constitution, Mandaluyong and the then-municipality of San Juan were represented in Congress by a single congressman.

San Juan–Mandaluyong Representative Ronaldo Zamora sponsored a House Bill which eventually became Republic Act No. 7675 otherwise known as "An Act Converting the Municipality of Mandaluyong into a Highly Urbanized City to be known as the City of Mandaluyong." President Fidel V. Ramos signed R.A. No. 7675 into law on February 9, 1994 (the 49th anniversary of its liberation from the Japanese), which was ratified through a plebiscite on April 10, 1994, making Mandaluyong the fifth city in Metro Manila. Mandaluyong became a lone district with its own representative in Congress. Prior to the enactment of the assailed statute, the municipalities of Mandaluyong and San Juan belonged to only one legislative district.

=== Contemporary ===
Mandaluyong today is composed of 27 barangays divided into two political districts mainly by Boni Avenue and G. Aglipay Street.

In 2002, Mandaluyong was recognized as "The Tiger City of the Philippines" because of the dramatic improvement in the city's economy.

== Geography ==
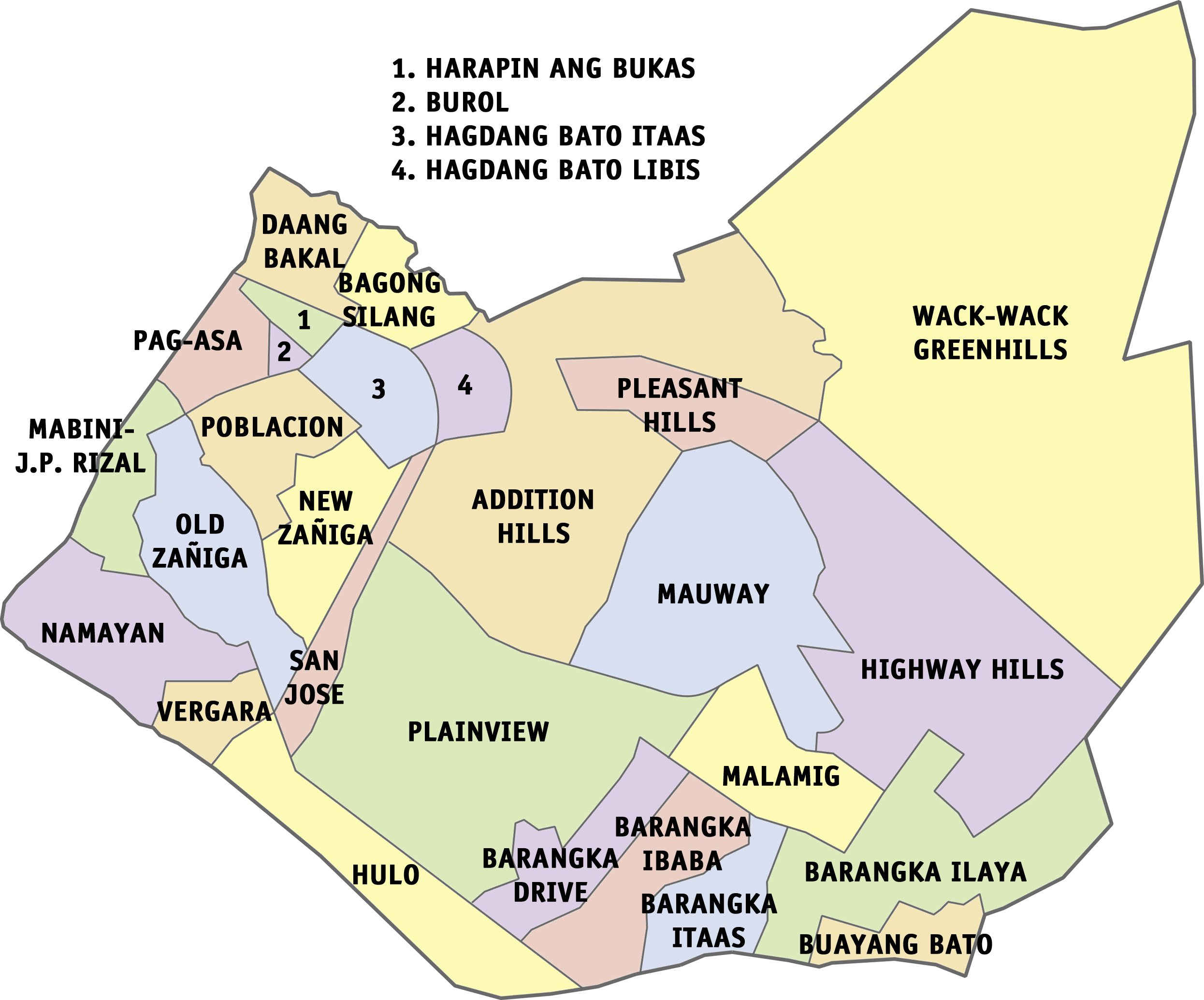
Political map of Mandaluyong

Mandaluyong lies on a heart-shaped 21.26 square kilometers (8.21 sq mi) of land, 7 kilometers (4.3 mi) southeast of Manila and 8 kilometers (5.0 mi) west of Pasig. To the south lies Makati across Pasig River, To the southeast lies Taguig also across Pasig River, to the northwest, San Juan, and to the northeast, Quezon City. Thus, Mandaluyong is located at the center of Metro Manila.

=== Barangays ===
Mandaluyong is politically subdivided into 27 barangays.

District	Barangay	Barangay Chairman	Land Area (has.)	Population (2007)	Population (2010)	Population (2015)	Population (2020)
1	Addition Hills	Carlito Cernal	162.00	81,221	86,731	99,058	108,896
1	Bagong Silang	Kristofer Dominguez	14.26	3,747	4,652	5,572	4,939
2	Barangka Drive	Darwin Fernandez	24.54	12,134	12,227	13,310	15,474
2	Barangka Ibaba	Edwin Santa Maria	16.92	9,372	9,241	9,540	9,040
2	Barangka Ilaya	Joselito Pangilinan	47.45	4,185	5,049	17,896	22,334
2	Barangka Itaas	Ronaldo Camacho	17.21	11,212	11,061	11,252	11,242
2	Buayang Bato	Reynaldo Nobela	7.26	999	1,340	1,782	2,913
1	Burol	Dan Carl De Guzman	2.78	2,322	2,606	2,740	2,650
1	Daang Bakal	Richard Bassig	17.34	2,980	3,931	3,660	4,529
1	Hagdan Bato Itaas	Merlyn Espiritu	18.36	9,431	10,102	10,314	10,267
1	Hagdan Bato Libis	Danilo Torres	15.48	6,241	6,716	6,962	6,715
1	Harapin Ang Bukas	Federico Ogbac	4.89	4,069	4,073	4,496	4,244
1	Highway Hills	Maria Corazon Abalos	105.12	18,682	22,684	28,703	43,267
2	Hulo	Joseph Jose	29.30	20,850	21,107	27,515	31,335
2	Mabini–J.Rizal	Antonio Castañeda	11.88	4,826	6,773	7,628	7,882
2	Malamig	Cynthia Caluya	29.52	6,898	7,007	12,667	12,054
1	Mauway	Froilo Achilles Evangelista	19.25	21,700	25,129	29,103	25,800
2	Namayan	Victor Francisco	30.60	4,846	5,706	6,123	7,670
1	New Zañiga	Elizabeth Cruz	21.96	5,413	6,354	7,534	8,444
2	Old Zañiga	Alex Lacson	42.48	6,674	7,712	7,013	6,636
1	Pag-Asa	Conrado Angga Jr.	12.60	3,112	3,688	4,053	4,195
2	Plainview	Nerissa Garcia	115.92	24,706	24,396	26,575	29,378
1	Pleasant Hills	Marc Renniel Evangelista	20.33	6,495	5,648	5,910	6,003
1	Poblacion	Elmer Jose Malabanan	24.12	14,778	15,191	14,733	16,333
2	San Jose	Joan Batan	3.80	7,629	7,041	7,262	8,483
2	Vergara	Ernesto Mendiola	15.12	4,928	4,645	5,910	4,357
1	Wack-Wack Greenhills	Margarita Climaco	294.48	6,126	7,889	8,965	10,678

=== Climate ===
Mandaluyong's climate is classified as tropical. In winter, there is much less rainfall in Mandaluyong than in summer. This climate is considered to be Aw according to the Köppen-Geiger climate classification. The temperature here averages 27.2 °C (81.0 °F). In a year, the average rainfall is 2,093 mm (82.4 in). Precipitation is the lowest in February, with an average of 8 mm (0.31 in). With an average of 448 mm (17.6 in), the most precipitation falls in August. At an average temperature of 29.2 °C (84.6 °F), May is the hottest month of the year. January has the lowest average temperature of the year. It is 25.5 °C (77.9 °F). Between the driest and wettest months, the difference in precipitation is 440 mm (17 in). During the year, the average temperatures vary by 3.7 °C (38.7 °F).

Climate data for Mandaluyong
Month	Jan	Feb	Mar	Apr	May	Jun	Jul	Aug	Sep	Oct	Nov	Dec	Year
Mean daily maximum °C (°F)	29.7 (85.5)	30.5 (86.9)	32.1 (89.8)	33.7 (92.7)	33.8 (92.8)	32.3 (90.1)	31.1 (88.0)	30.6 (87.1)	30.7 (87.3)	30.9 (87.6)	30.4 (86.7)	29.7 (85.5)	31.3 (88.3)
Daily mean °C (°F)	25.5 (77.9)	25.9 (78.6)	27.2 (81.0)	28.7 (83.7)	29.2 (84.6)	28.4 (83.1)	27.6 (81.7)	27.3 (81.1)	27.2 (81.0)	27.2 (81.0)	26.7 (80.1)	25.9 (78.6)	27.2 (81.0)
Mean daily minimum °C (°F)	21.3 (70.3)	21.4 (70.5)	22.4 (72.3)	23.8 (74.8)	24.7 (76.5)	24.5 (76.1)	24.1 (75.4)	24.0 (75.2)	23.8 (74.8)	23.5 (74.3)	23.0 (73.4)	22.1 (71.8)	23.2 (73.8)
Average precipitation mm (inches)	13.5 (0.53)	7.3 (0.29)	21.4 (0.84)	18.7 (0.74)	138.6 (5.46)	283.8 (11.17)	364.1 (14.33)	476.3 (18.75)	334.1 (13.15)	200.5 (7.89)	111.4 (4.39)	56.0 (2.20)	2,025.7 (79.74)
Average rainy days (≥ 0.10 mm)	4	2	3	3	10	16	22	22	20	18	14	9	143
Average relative humidity (%)	72	73	66	64	68	76	80	83	81	78	76	75	74
Mean monthly sunshine hours	176.7	197.8	225.8	258.0	222.7	162.0	132.8	132.8	132.0	157.6	153.0	151.9	2,103.1
Percentage possible sunshine	51	61	61	70	57	42	34	34	36	44	45	44	48
Source 1: Climate-Data.org (Temperature)
Source 2: Climatemps.com (Sunshine)

== Demographics ==
Population census of Mandaluyong
Year	Pop.	±% p.a.
1903	4,349	—
1918	5,806	+1.94%
1939	18,200	+5.59%
1948	26,309	+4.18%
1960	71,619	+8.70%
1970	149,407	+7.62%
1975	182,267	+4.07%
1980	205,366	+2.41%
1990	248,143	+1.91%
1995	286,870	+2.75%
2000	278,474	−0.63%
2007	305,576	+1.29%
2010	328,699	+2.69%
2015	386,276	+3.12%
2020	425,758	+2.07%
2024	465,902	+2.19%
Source: Philippine Statistics Authority

As of the 2024 census, Mandaluyong has a population of 465,902 residents and a population density of approximately 41,380 inhabitants per square kilometer or 107,200 inhabitants per square mile.

=== Demonym ===
Residents of Mandaluyong are referred to as "Mandaleños," with almost all being Filipinos of various ethnicities.

=== Language ===
Filipino, a standardized version of Tagalog, is spoken primarily in Metro Manila. Filipino and English are the official languages of the Philippines.

=== Religion ===
Mandaluyong is predominantly Roman Catholic, with a minority distributed among religious denominations including the Iglesia ni Cristo, Evangelical Christianity, Protestantism, Jehovah’s Witness, and Philippine Independent Church.

== Economy ==
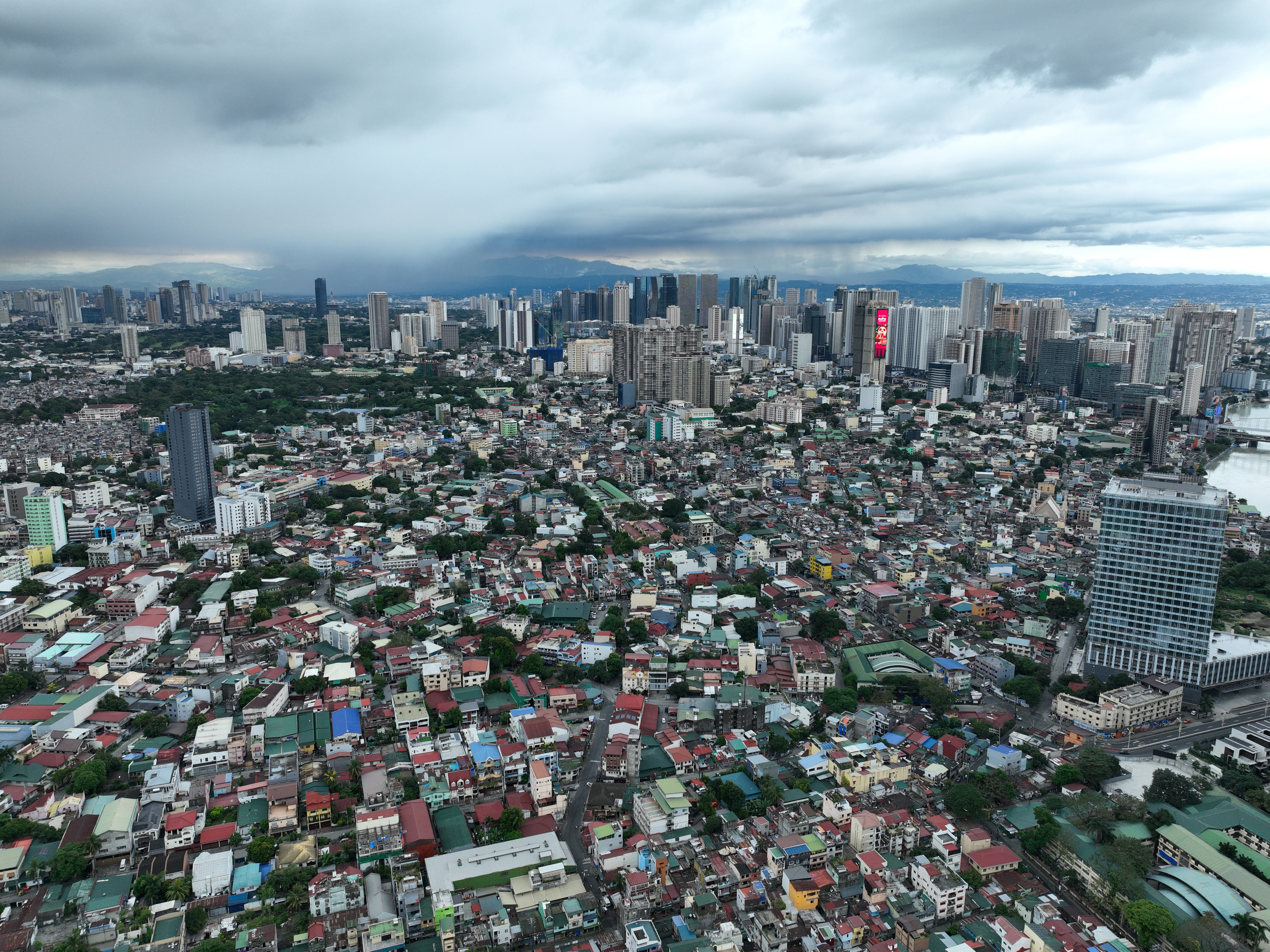
A drone shot of central Mandaluyong City, with buildings from the Ortigas Center, Greenfield District, Eastwood City, Greenhills Shopping Center, and the Araneta City at the background

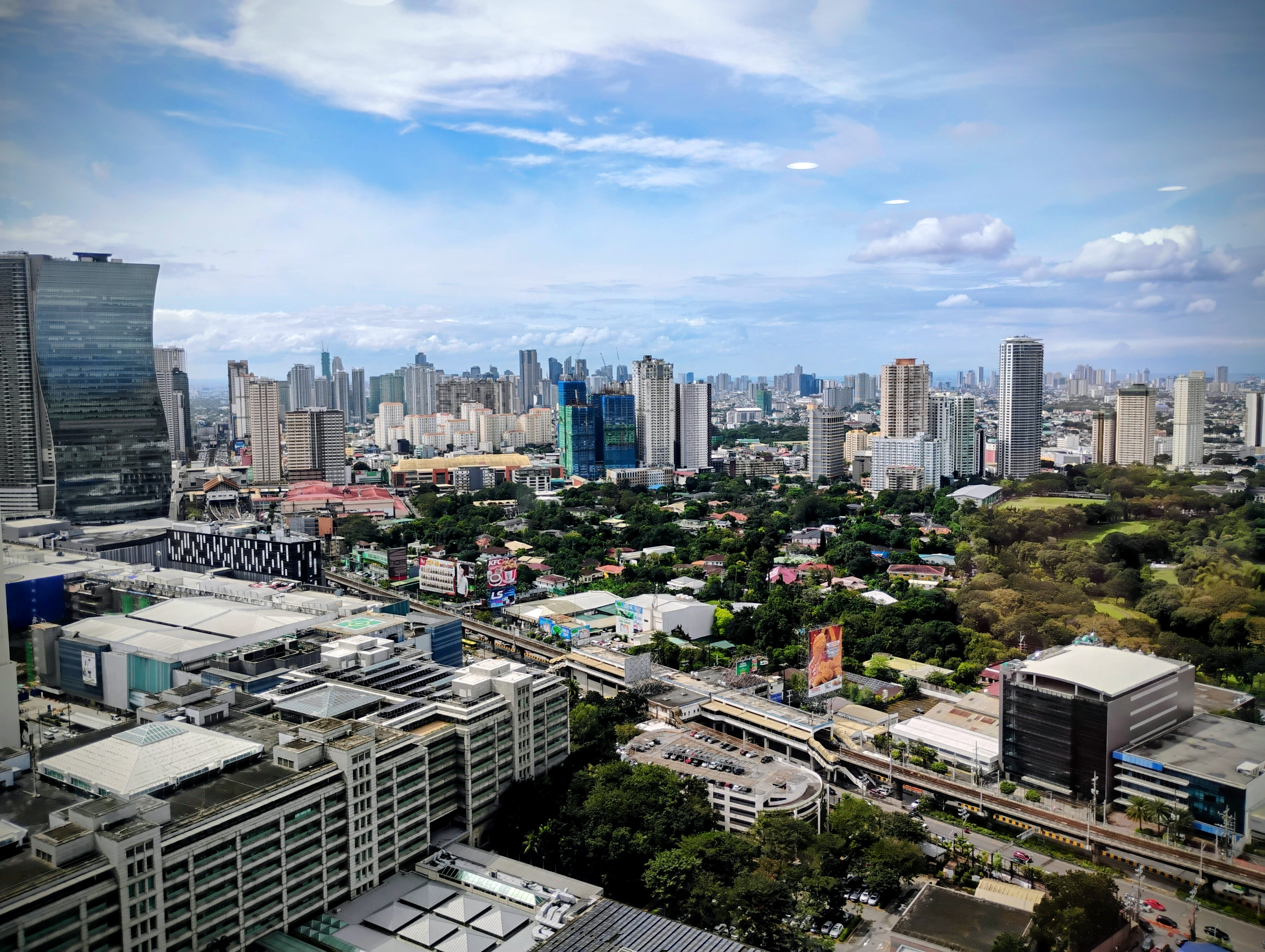
Aerial view of the eastern part of Mandaluyong.

Mandaluyong has the fourth-highest per capita GDP of the country at ₱629,421 (US$11,700).

The city is home to a number of shopping centers, entertainment hubs, commercial establishments, high-rise offices, residential condominiums and hotels. The city is one of the important business and financial areas in the metropolis.

=== Commercial activities ===
Like other cities in Metro Manila, Mandaluyong has its own share of commercial strips and a central business district. The former commercial area, consisting mostly of banks, offices and service establishments, stretch along public transport routes thereby serving both local consumers and passers-by from the neighboring localities. Major commercial strips of the city include the stretch of Boni Avenue, Shaw Boulevard, Libertad-Sierra Madre area, Kalentong, San Francisco, part of Felix Martinez Lorenzo or F. Martinez Ave, Sgt. Bumatay towards Barangka Drive and Pinatubo towards EDSA. Mandaluyong's central business district is concentrated on the EDSA-Shaw-Pioneer area; it includes the Greenfield District development.

Poverty incidence of Mandaluyong (%)

Source: Philippine Statistics Authority

=== Industrial activities ===
TV5 Media Center

Industrial activities are mostly concentrated within the Shaw Boulevard-Pioneer area and along the Pasig River. Although prominent in the manufacture of foods, medicines and laboratory equipment, these industries are gradually declining in number, opting to relocate in newly developed industrial zones outside Metropolitan Manila. In the Pasig River area, particularly in Barangays Namayan and Mabini–J. Rizal, areas formerly industrial are now the sites for residential subdivisions and townhouses. In the EDSA-Shaw-Pioneer area, the transformation is toward a more economically profitable and globally competitive commercial activity. And since December 2013, Mandaluyong is the home of one of the largest television networks in the country TV5 and one of the largest pay TV operator Cignal TV (both owned by the PLDT-backed firm MediaQuest Holdings located at the TV5 Media Center which also serving as the master playout facility of CNN Philippines' successor RPTV), along with both the master playout facility of Solar Entertainment Corporation and the relay playout facility of RPTV (located at the Worldwide Corporate Center which also housed the main offices of companies owned by real estate magnate, former Senator, and All TV's owner Manny Villar and formerly the Nine Media Corporation-owned news channel CNN Philippines), and several radio stations associated to the Vera Group (Mellow 94.7, Magic 89.9, 99.5 Play FM, All Radio 103.5, DWBL and the now-defunct DWSS, all are located at the Paragon Plaza).

=== Shopping centers ===
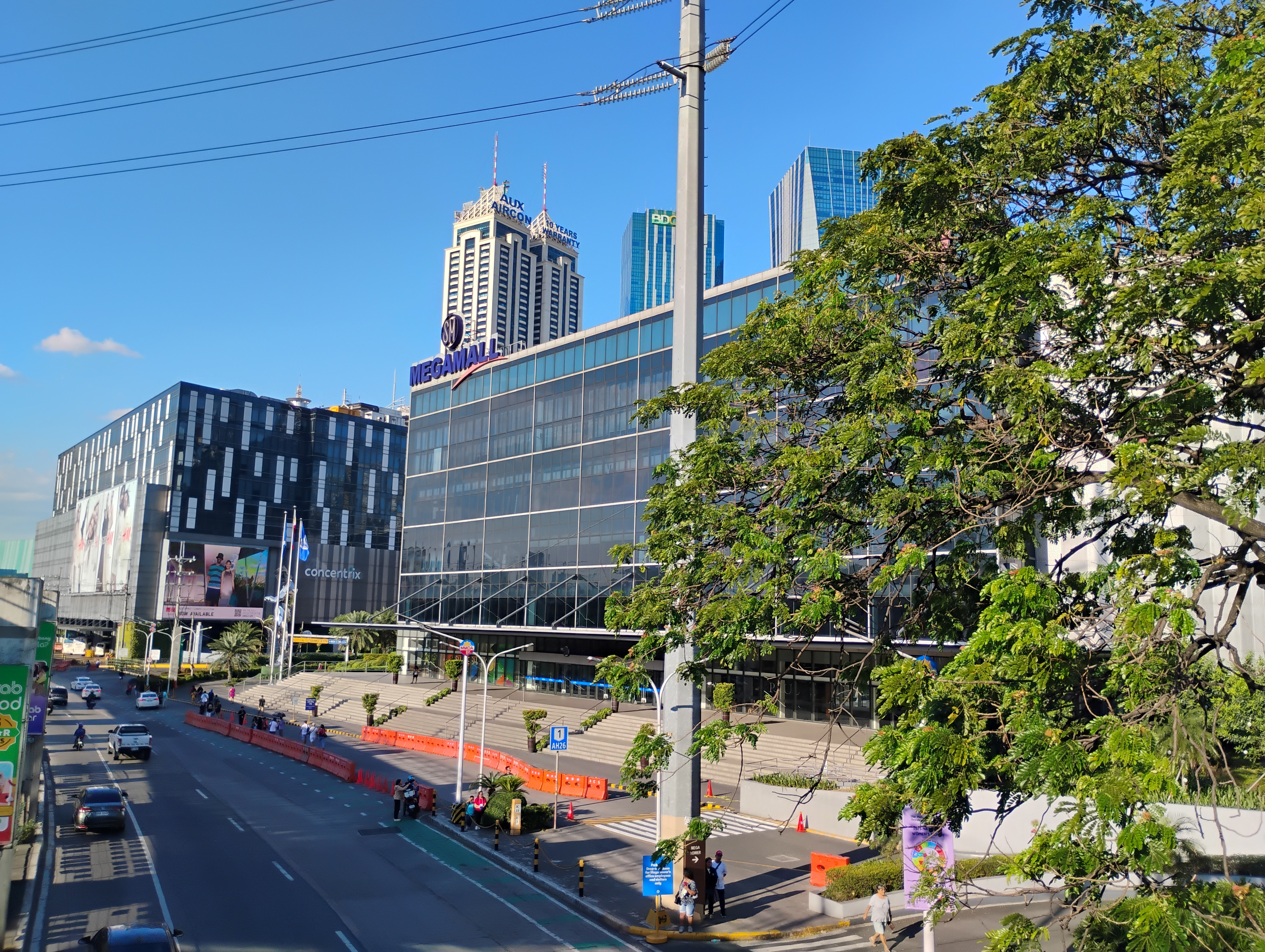
SM Megamall

These super-regional supermalls each have over a hundred local and international stores and are anchored by at least one department store and supermarket or hypermarket. They are the largest malls in Metro Manila which feature not just stores but also such attractions as movie theaters, rides, skating rinks, bowling alleys and other recreational facilities. Each provides thousands of automobile parking spaces and are located mostly near rail stations and established business districts within the metropolis. These malls serve not only the Metro Manila and Greater Manila Area residents, but also local and foreign tourists. Among the malls in the city are Shangri-La Plaza, SM Megamall, The Podium, St. Francis Square, Starmall EDSA-Shaw, SM Cherry Shaw, The Marketplace Shopping Mall (the site of the Mandaluyong Public Market), Shaw Center Mall, four strip malls at the Greenfield District, and pocket malls at residential condominiums. Multiple streets named after soldiers such as Petronilo Martinez or P. Martinez St., Sgt. Bumatay, both colleagues from World War II, and Sgt. Kalentong from the Philippine Revolution have been turned into landmarks for clinics and shopping districts.

The city is also home to Puregold Shaw, the supermarket chain's inaugural branch that opened in 1998.

== Government ==
Mandaluyong City Hall

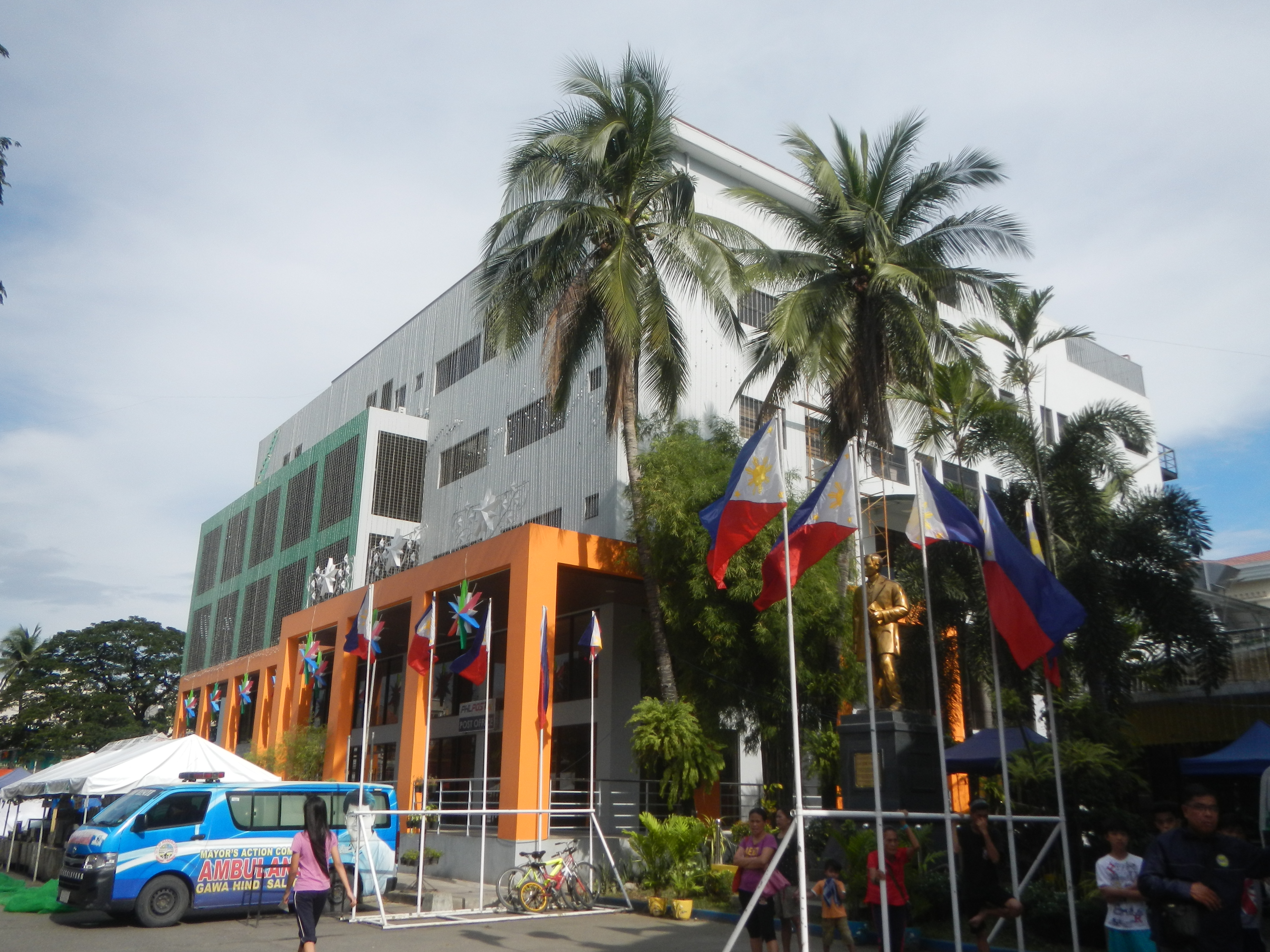
Mandaluyong Hall of Justice

=== Incumbent city officials ===
Position	Candidate	Party
Representative; Lone Legislative District	Alexandria P. Gonzales	NUP
Mayor	Carmelita A. Abalos	PFP
Vice Mayor	Antonio D. Suva Jr.	PFP
City Councilors
City Councilors	1st Councilor District	
City Councilors	Charisse Marie A. Abalos-Vargas	PFP
City Councilors	Anjelo Elton P. Yap	PFP
City Councilors	Danilo L. De Guzman	PFP
City Councilors	Carissa Mariz S. Manalo	PFP
City Councilors	Grace Marie V. Antonio	PFP
City Councilors	Estanislao V. Alim III	PFP
City Councilors	2nd Councilor District	
City Councilors	Benjamin A. Abalos III	PFP
City Councilors	Alexander C. Sta. Maria	PFP
City Councilors	Michael Eric G. Cuejilo	PFP
City Councilors	Fernando S. Ocampo	PFP
City Councilors	Reginald S. Antiojo	PFP
City Councilors	Leslie F. Cruz	PFP
ABC President	Darwin Fernandez	
SK President	Aeron Sedrick Mangaliag	

=== History of the Seal of Mandaluyong ===
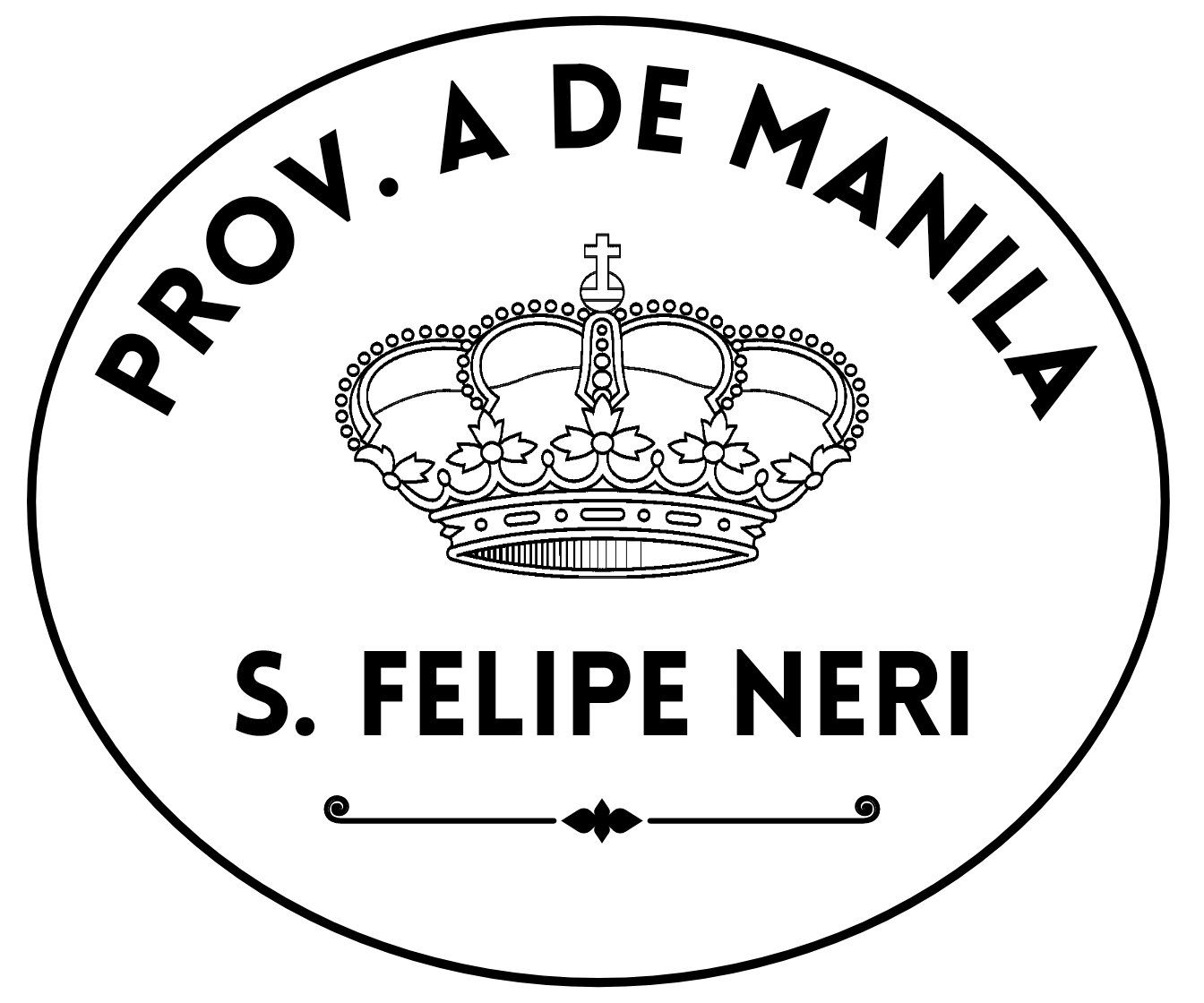
Seal of the Municipal of San Felipe Neri (1623 -1901)

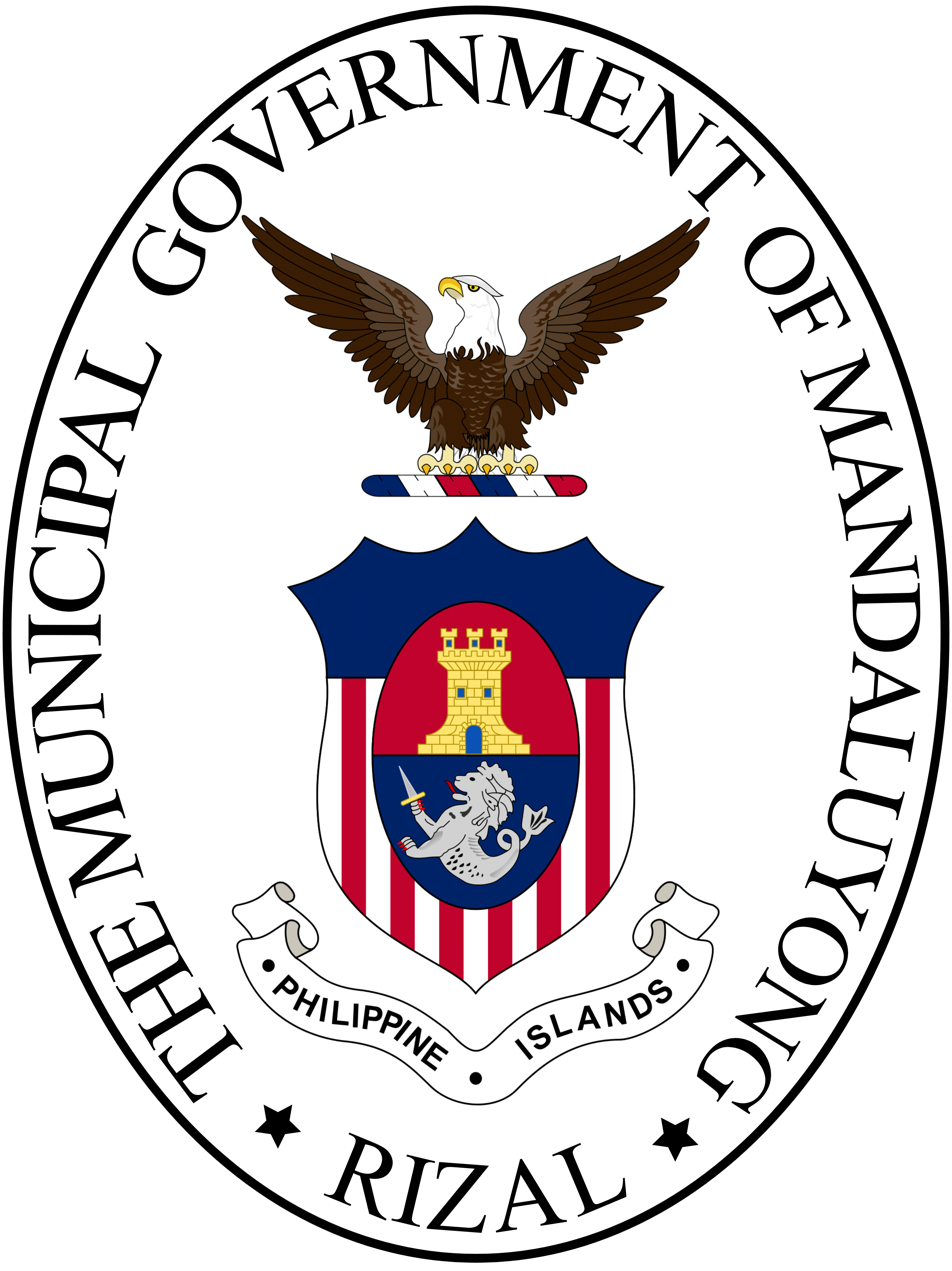
Seal of the Municipal Government of Mandaluyong (1901 - 1934)

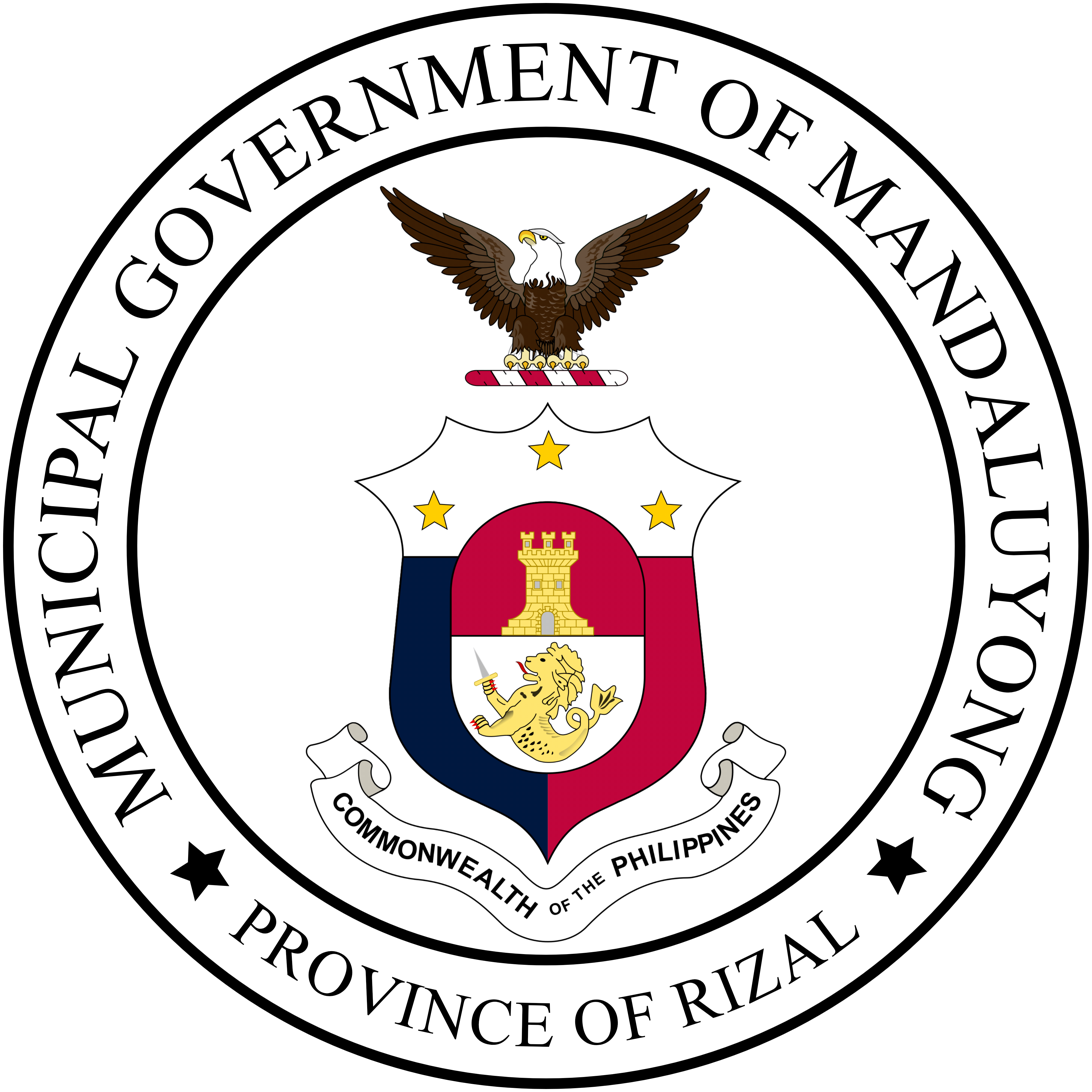
Seal of the Municipal Government of Mandaluyong (1935 - 1945)

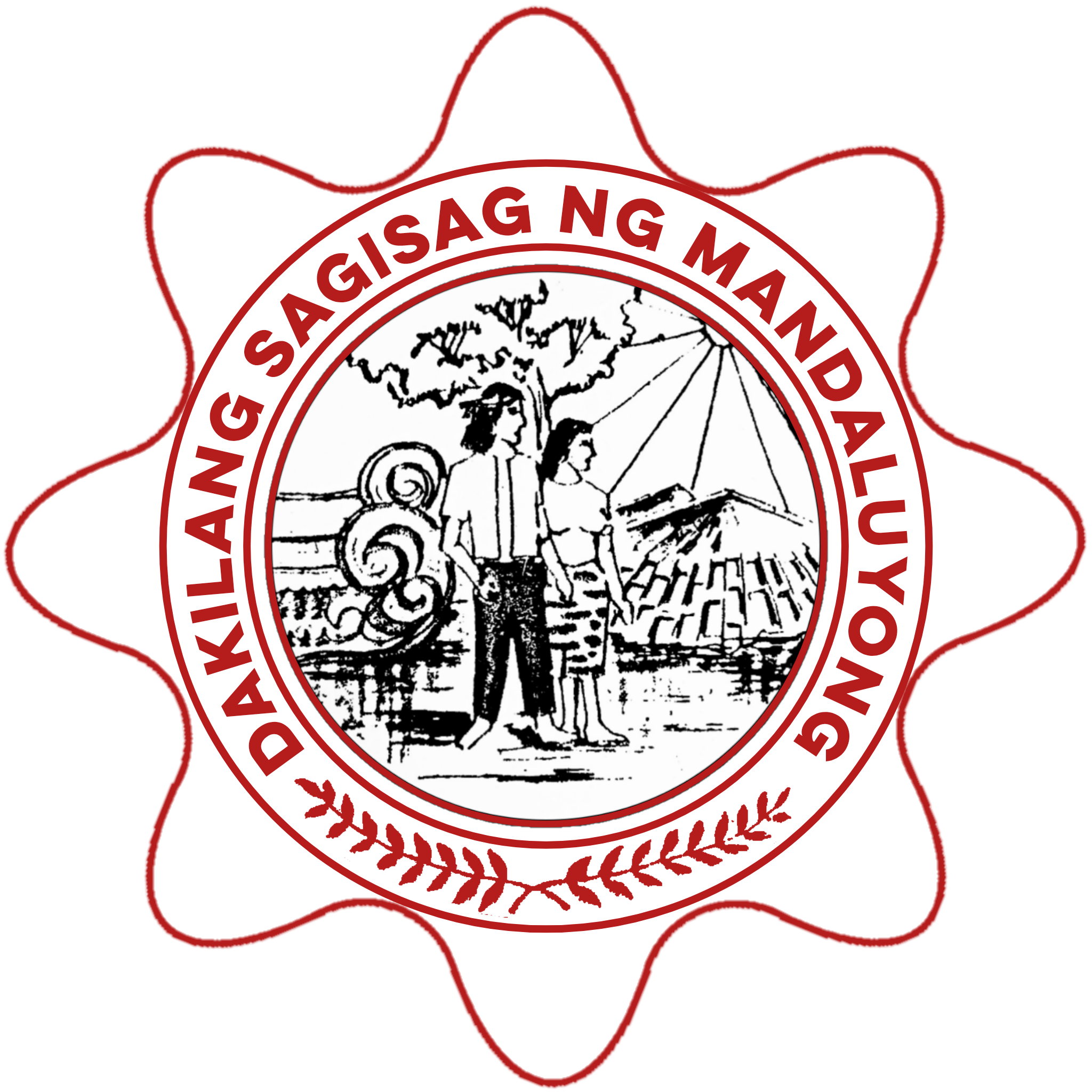
Seal of the Municipal of Mandaluyong (1946 - 1986)

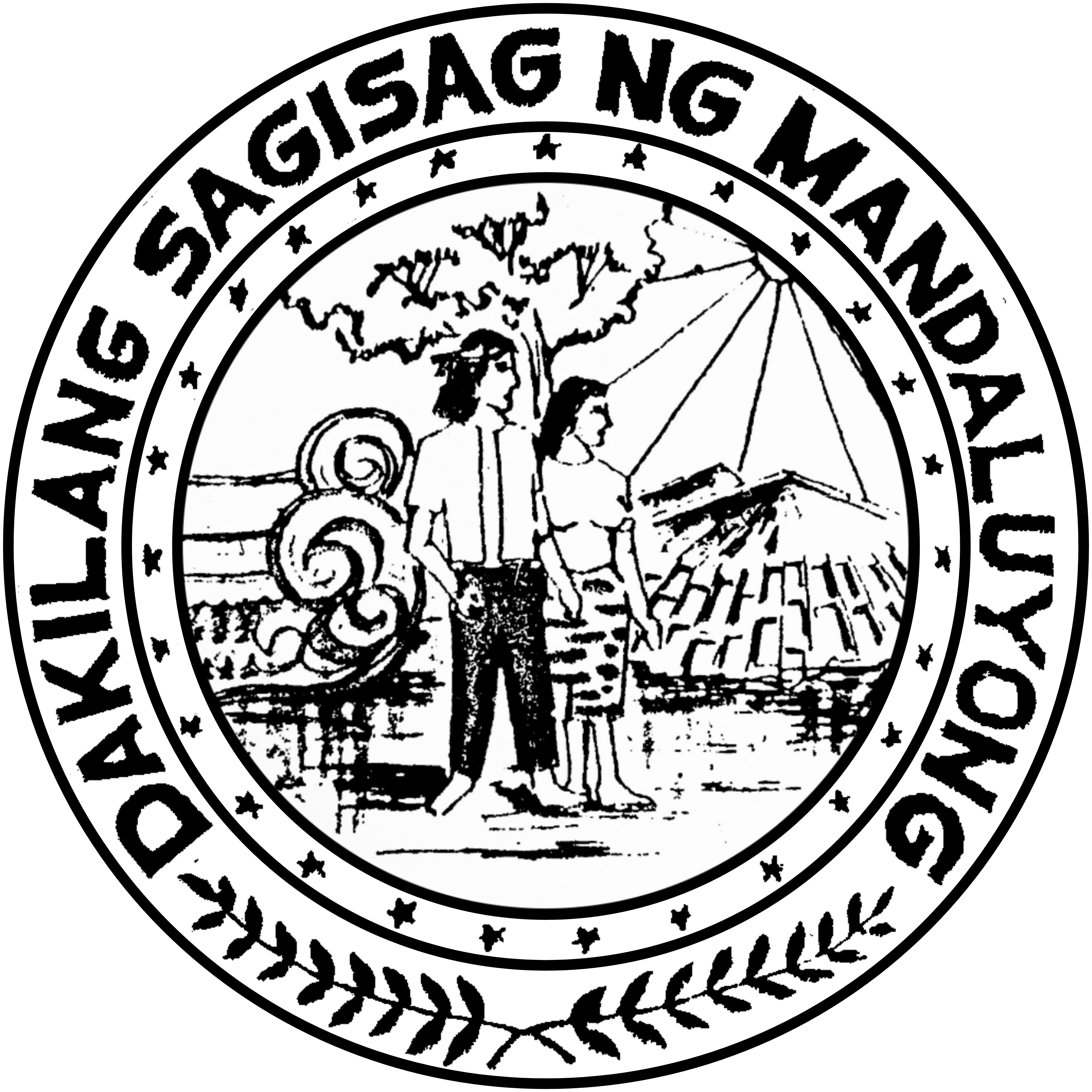
Seal of the Municipal of Mandaluyong (1986 - 1989)

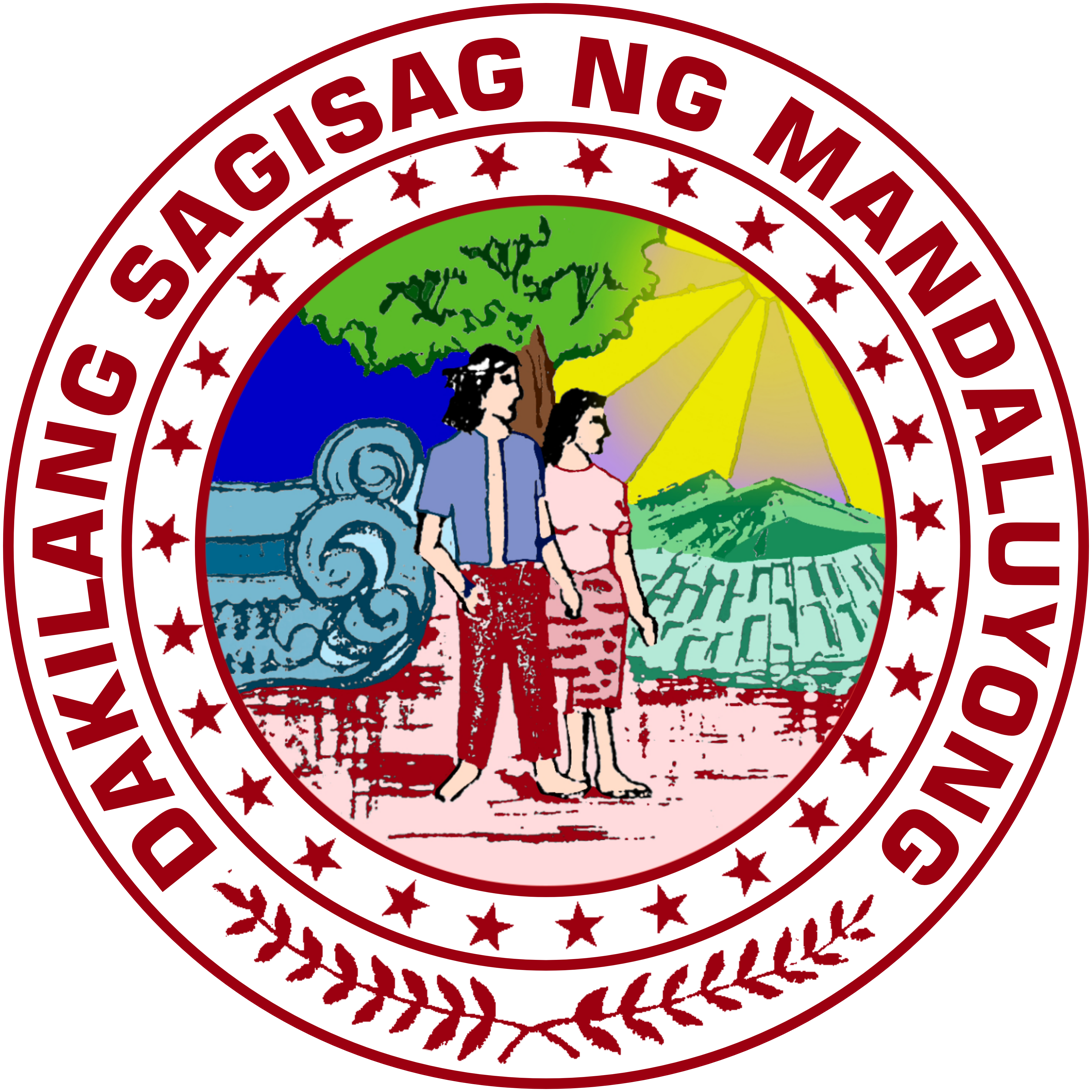
Seal of the Municipal of Mandaluyong (1990 - 1994)

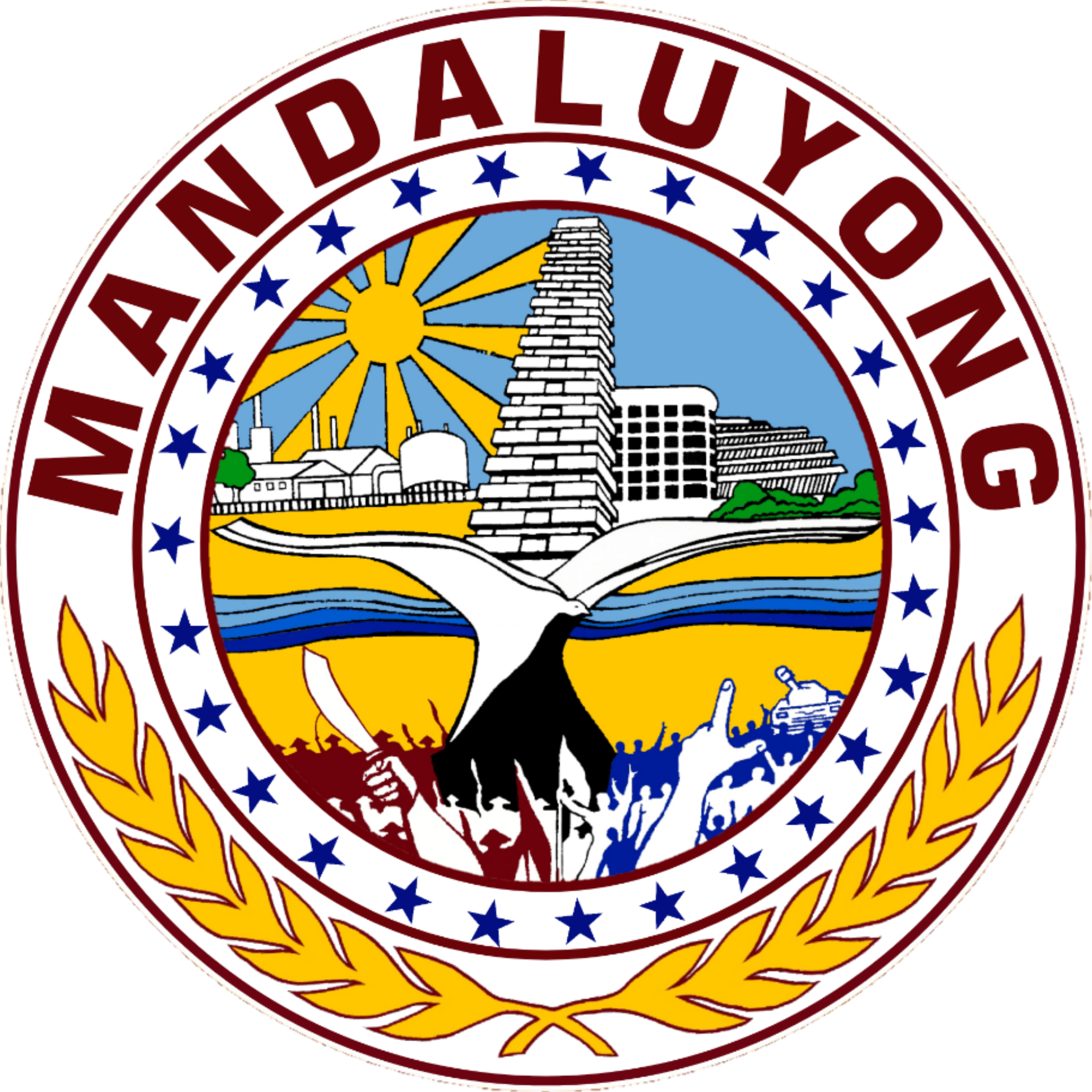
Seal of the City of Mandaluyong (1994 - 1997)

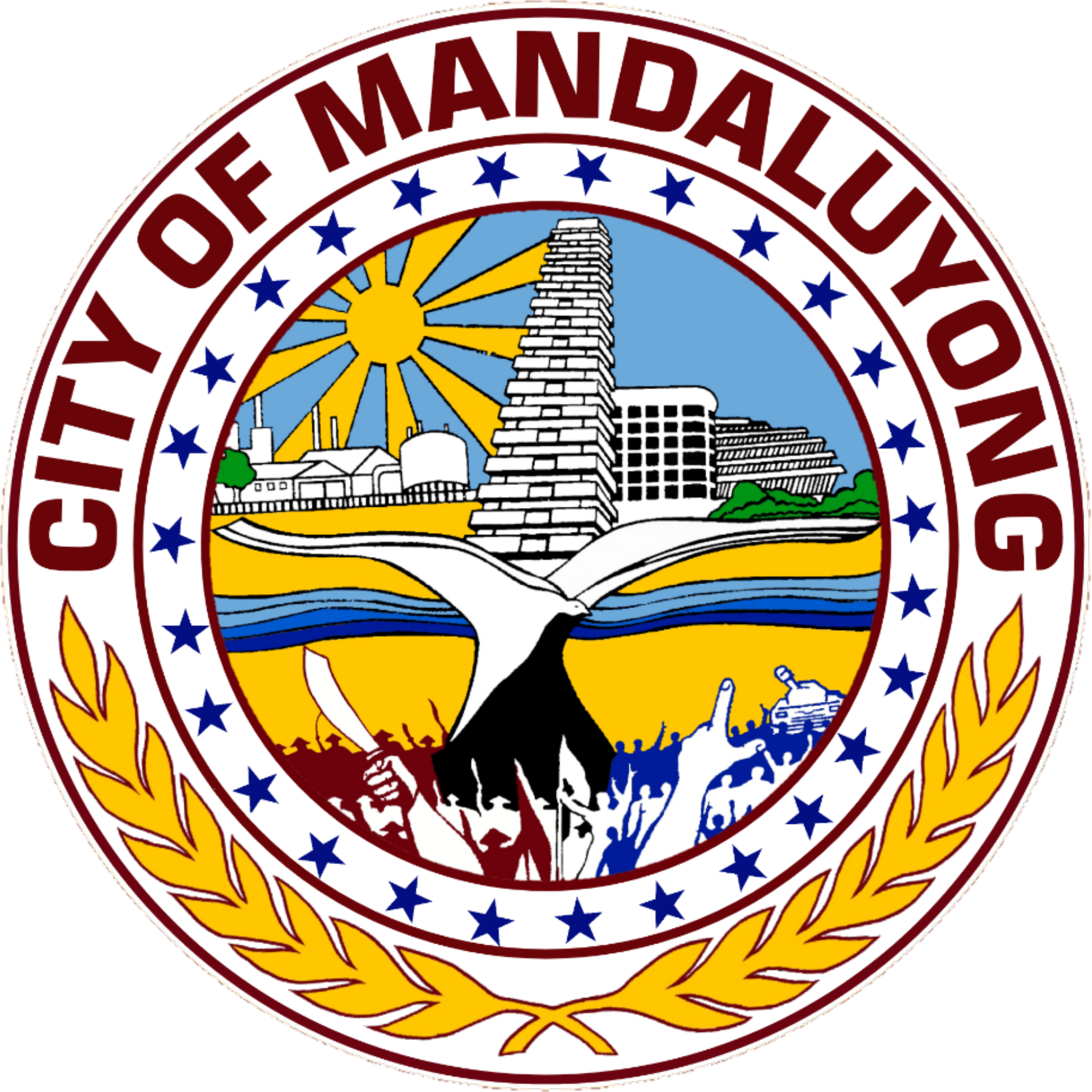
Seal of the City of Mandaluyong (1997 - 2004)

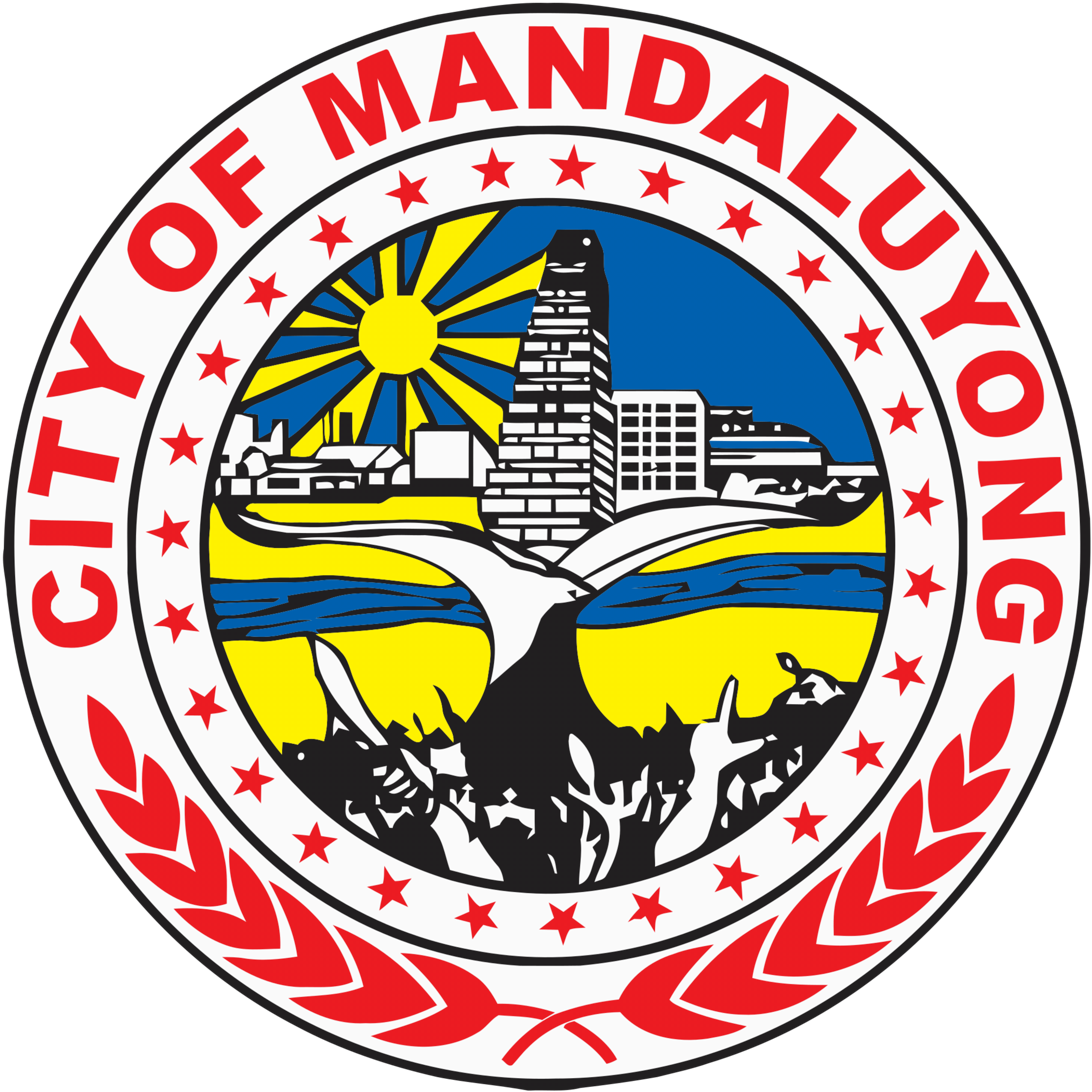
Seal of the City of Mandaluyong (2004 Present)

== Transportation ==
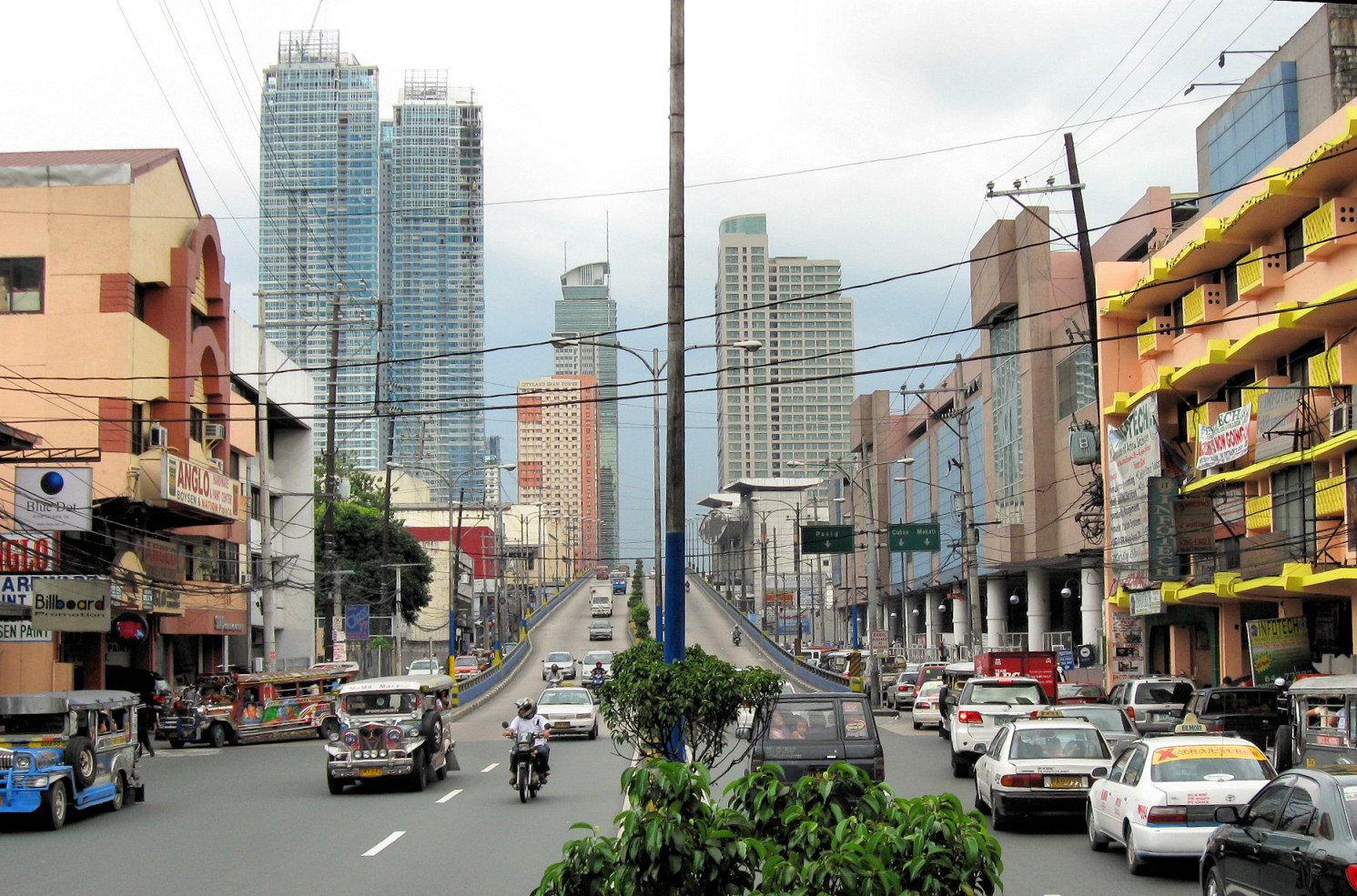
Shaw Boulevard, one of the major thoroughfares in the city

The city is provided with good access roads to and from adjacent cities in Metro Manila through main roads such as the Epifanio de los Santos Avenue (EDSA), Ortigas Avenue and Shaw Boulevard.

=== Land ===
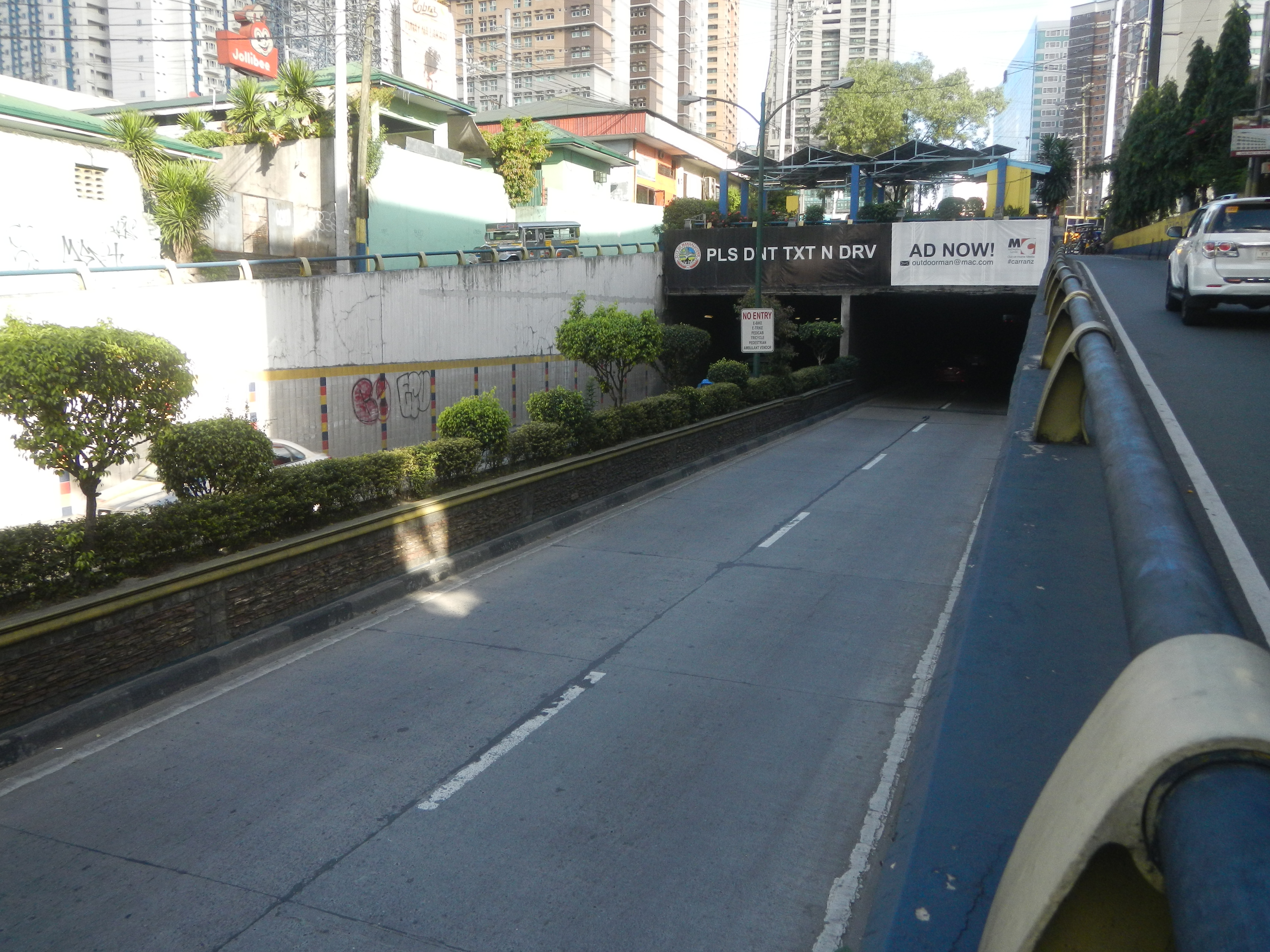
Boni-Pioneer Underpass

Mandaluyong is primarily served by a public road network consisting of 80.93 km (50.29 mi) concrete and asphalt roads. With a total road density of 7.19 km (4.47 mi) per 1 ha (0.010 km^{2}) of land, the city is considered to be over-served with roads.

The city is mainly served by EDSA, Metro Manila's main thoroughfare. Considered as the heart of the metropolis, main roads such as Ortigas Avenue and Shaw Boulevard provide inter-city linkages, while Boni Avenue and F. Martinez Street serve as alternate routes in the city. Other major roads in Mandaluyong include the Boni-Pioneer Underpass, a 280-meter-long (920 ft) tunnel underneath EDSA connecting Boni Avenue on its western-end and Pioneer Street on the east. and Julia Vargas Avenue in Ortigas Center. Jeepneys are one of the most common modes of public transportation for commuters in the city. Aside from jeepneys, tricycles and pedicabs are also one of the important modes of public transportation in Mandaluyong, especially on alleys around the city.

=== Water ===
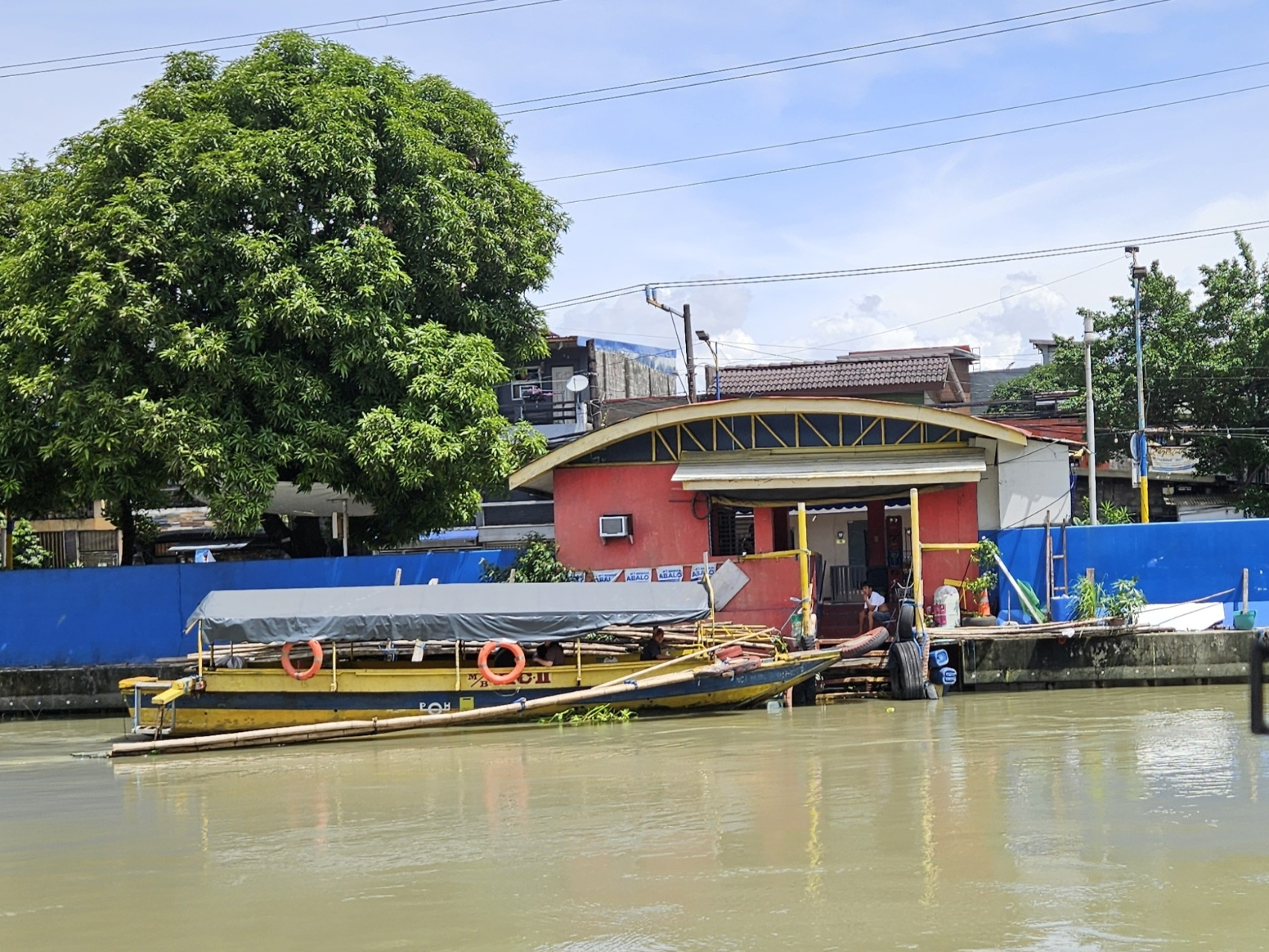
Hulo station of the Pasig River Ferry Service.

The presence of the Pasig River stretching along the south border of Mandaluyong provides an alternative route and mode of public transportation mainly for cargo freight of industries along the river, and for commuters seeking for a faster and more direct route to and from the cities of Pasig and Manila. The Pasig River Ferry Service has one station in the city, located at Hulo.

=== Railway ===
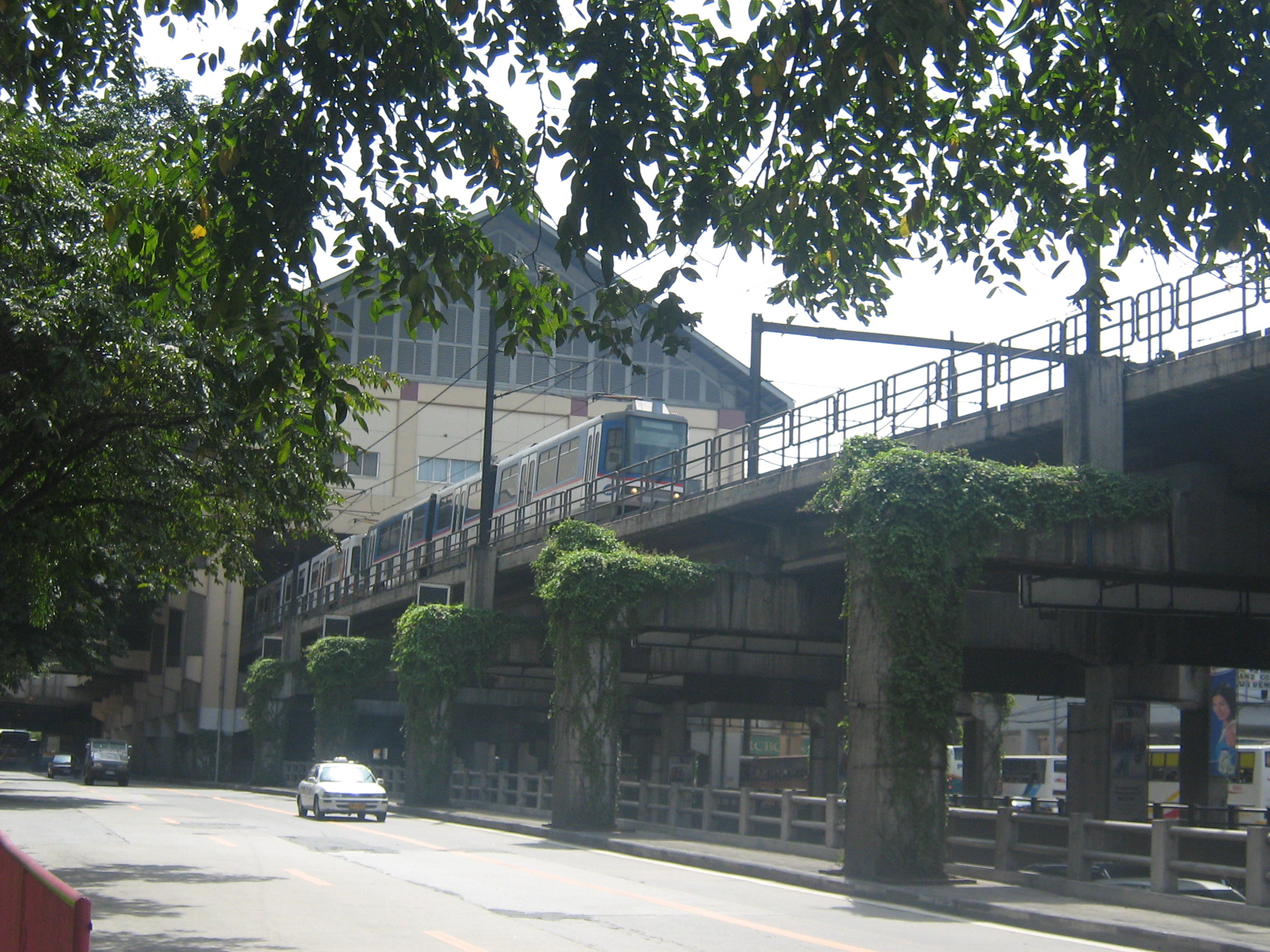
MRT Line 3 train leaving Shaw Boulevard station

The city is also served by rail via the Manila Metro Rail Transit System Line 3 (MRT-3), located along EDSA. The city is served by the three MRT-3 stations of Ortigas, Shaw Boulevard, and Boni.

Philippine National Railways once served Mandaluyong through its defunct Santa Mesa–Antipolo branch until the bridge that carried it across the San Juan River collapsed in 1982.

== Healthcare ==
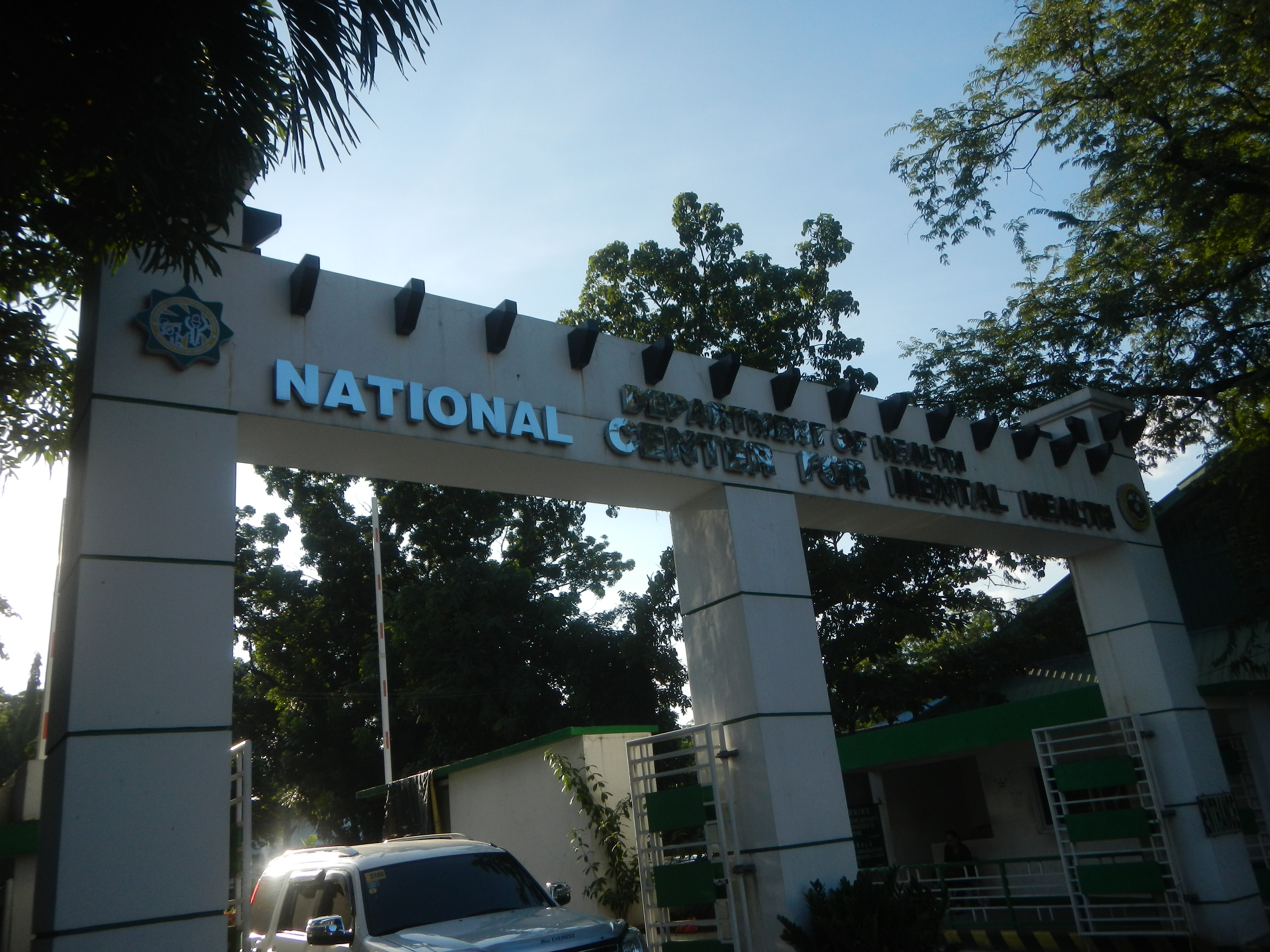
The National Center for Mental Health

Mandaluyong has several private and public hospitals & health center, namely the privately owned Dr. Victor R. Potenciano Medical Center along EDSA and Unciano General Hospital, and the government hospital Mandaluyong City Medical Center. The city is also home to the National Center for Mental Health. Many residents, specifically the middle-to-upper class medical clientele, visit the nearby The Medical City in Ortigas Center, Pasig.

In 2007, the Mandaluyong city government, together with non-governmental organization Rehabilitation and Empowerment of Adults and Children (REACH) Foundation, established a community-based rehabilitation program called Project Therapy, Education, and Assimilation of Children with Handicap (TEACH), that caters to children with special needs coming from indigent families. Services given by Project TEACH include free occupational therapy, physical therapy, speech therapy and special education classes.

== Education ==
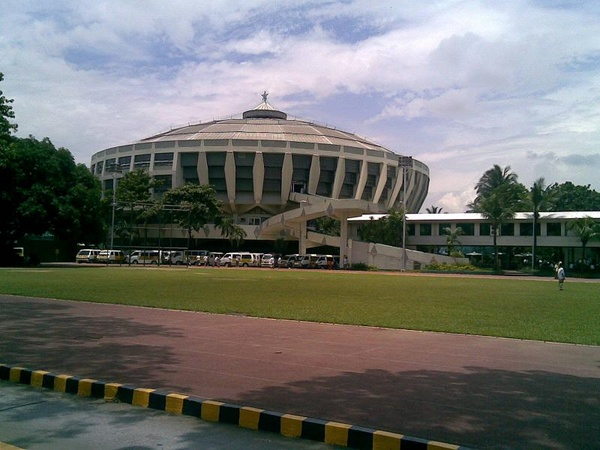
St. Benilde Gymnasium in La Salle Green Hills

Four well-known educational institutions in the city are the Arellano University – Plaridel Campus, Don Bosco Technical College, José Rizal University and Rizal Technological University.

A good number of city officials of Mandaluyong are alumni of Don Bosco, including incumbent Mayor, Benjamin Abalos Jr. (HS '79); former Vice Mayor, Renato Santa Maria (HS '65); City Councilors Edward Bartolome (HS '96), Noel Bernardo (HS '79), and Jonathan Abalos (HS '85). Other notable alumni include rapper Francis Magalona (HS '81); and actor Ricky Davao (HS '78). Meanwhile, the alumni of JRU that includes President Ramon Magsaysay, Roderick Paulate, and Armand Fabella. Other colleges in the city include the Our Lady of Guadalupe Colleges (specializing in Medicine and Nursing), STI and AMA (both specializing in Computer Technology education, both located on Shaw Boulevard), NAMEI Polytechnic Institute (specializing in Marine Sciences), and the International Baptist College.

The city is also home to Lourdes School of Mandaluyong (est. 1911), a Franciscan-Marian all-boys school, located in the Ortigas Center district managed by the OFM Capuchins; La Salle Green Hills (est. 1959), a private co-educational school, managed by the De La Salle Brothers, located along Ortigas Avenue; and Saint Pedro Poveda College (est. 1960), another all-girls institution, offering pre-school, grade school, high school, and college education. Although the official school address is Quezon City, part of the lot Poveda's campus stands on is under Mandaluyong.

Mandaluyong High School (est. 1977) is the oldest public high school in the city. City of Mandaluyong Science High School (est. 1996) is a public science high school on E. Pantaleon Street. The city has 18 public schools, including primary and secondary schools, all under the supervision of Department of Education's Schools Division Office (SDO) of Mandaluyong. The Mataas Na Paaralang Neptali A. Gonzales, named after Mandaluyong native and former Senator Neptali Gonzales, is the largest school in Mandaluyong and the only school in the city with the STEM high school program.

== International relations ==
=== Diplomatic missions ===
Countries that have set up permanent missions or embassies in the city include:

- Malta
- Peru
- Slovenia
- Sudan
- Tanzania

=== Sister cities ===
National
- Legazpi, Albay
- Silay, Negros Occidental
- Tagum, Davao del Norte
- Alaminos, Laguna

== Notable personalities ==
- Aljon Mariano (b. 1992) - basketball player
- Ara Mina (b. 1979) - actress, tv host
- Gio Alvarez (b. 1976) - actor
- Joem Bascon (b.1986) - actor
- Kristine Singson-Meehan (b. 1973) - deputy speaker of the House of Representatives of the Philippines
- Alan Peter Cayetano (b. 1970) - senator, 26th Secretary of Foreign Affairs
- Anicka Castañeda (b. 1999) - footballer
- Antonio Cabangon-Chua (b. 1934, d. 2016) - Philippine Ambassador to Laos, entrepreneur, and businessman
- Benjamin Abalos (b. 1934) - 16th and 23rd mayor of Mandaluyong, former Chairperson of the Metropolitan Manila Development Authority, and former chairman of the Commission on Elections
- Benjamin Abalos Jr. (b. 1962) - 15th mayor of Mandaluyong, former Chairperson of the Metropolitan Manila Development Authority, and current Secretary of the Interior and Local Government
- Jonathan Clement "JC" Abalos II (b. 1994) politician
- Brigiding (b. 1992) – drag performer, Drag Race Philippines (Season 1) contestant
- Carmela Tunay (b. 1995) - former volleyball player, actress, and TV host
- Carmelita Abalos (b. 1962) - 22nd and 24th mayor of Mandaluyong
- Coleen Garcia (b. 1992) - actress, host, and model
- Dante Jimenez (b. 1952, d. 2021) - chairman of the Presidential Anti-Corruption Commission, founder of Volunteers Against Crime and Corruption, and educator
- Elmer Borlongan (b. 1967) - painter
- Francis Magalona (b. 1964, d. 2009) - rapper, singer, and songwriter
- Freddy Gonzalez (b. 1978) - former football player
- Fyang Smith (b. 2006) - social media influencer and model
- Gio Alvarez (b. 1976) - actor
- Imee Marcos (b. 1955) - current Senator, politician, sister of current Philippine president Bongbong Marcos
- Javi Gómez de Liaño (b. 1998) - basketball player
- John Raspado (b. 1981) - businessman, titleholder of Mr. Gay World Philippines 2016 and Mr Gay World 2017
- Johnedel Cardel (b. 1970) - basketball coach, former basketball player
- Juami Tiongson (b. 1991) - basketball player
- Kevin Racal (b. 1991) - basketball player
- Lance Serrano (b. 1992) - actor, model, and basketball player
- Lei Ponce (b. 1984) - make-up artist and titleholder of Mr. Fahrenheit 2016
- Louie Mar Gangcuangco (b. 1987) - physician, HIV researcher, and professor
- Manny Victorino (b. 1958) - retired basketball player
- Maico Buncio (b. 1988, d. 2011) - motorcycle racer
- Mark Cardona (b. 1981) - basketball player
- Marlon Manalo (b. 1975) - former pool player
- Michele Bumgarner (b. 1989) - racing driver
- Mikey Bustos (b. 1981) - YouTuber, vlogger, singer, and comedian
- Neptali Gonzales (b. 1923, d. 2001) - 13th Senate president, former congressman of the first district of Rizal and San Juan–Mandaluyong
- Neptali Gonzales II (b. 1954) - 14th mayor of Mandaluyong and current representative of the Lone District of Mandaluyong
- Paul Zamar (b. 1987) - basketball player
- Renz Ongkiko (b. 1988) - newscaster, media personality, and model
- Ria Atayde (b. 1992) - actress
- Rico Yan (b. 1975, d. 2002) - actor and entrepreneur
- Shehyee (b. 1992) - rapper, songwriter, and Internet personality
- Sophie Albert (b. 1990) - actress
- Camille Villar (b. 1985) - politician and former TV host
- Troy Rosario (b. 1992) - basketball player

== See also ==
- List of renamed cities and municipalities of the Philippines

Preceded by Pasig	Capital of Rizal as San Felipe Neri; 1904	Succeeded by Pasig
