= Mandaluyong High School =

School in Metro Manila, Philippines

Location
- Mandaluyong, Metro Manila; Philippines; 14°35′13.4″N 121°01′30.1″E

Information
- Established: 1977
- Principal: Ervin Salazar
- Grades: 7–12
- Enrollment: ~3,800
- Newspaper: Mandaluyong Journal, Ang Daloy
- Website: mhs.depedmandaluyong.org

Mandaluyong High School is a high school located in Mandaluyong, Metro Manila, Republic of the Philippines. Founded in 1977 through the initiative of the late Mayor Renato I. Lopez, Mandaluyong High School is the oldest public secondary school of Mandaluyong. Due to its scarcity of classrooms during its pioneering years, some classes had to be held in three different elementary schools. Evolving into a comprehensive four-year public high school with the construction of additional buildings and various facilities, the school now educates around 3,800 students in six buildings. With 55 classrooms, it has the largest building of all the city's schools.

== History ==
Mandaluyong High School was established when Rizal Technological University (formerly Rizal Technological Colleges) started to reduce enrolment with the plan of gradual phase out of its high school department. From 1977 to 1978, the emerging new secondary school enrolled the first and second year high school students from Rizal Technological Colleges. Mandaluyong High School started to operate on July 21, 1977.

On March 28, 2000 a government act was passed that decreed that the Mauway Annex be separated and converted into an independent high school initially known as Mandaluyong East High School. The name was subsequently changed to 'Mataas na Paaralang Neptali A. Gonzales' (Neptali A. Gonzales High School) after Neptali Gonzales II, the lawmaker who promoted the Act.

=== Building history ===
In due course, a national budget for the new school was allocated for the construction of the 20-classroom third and fourth year buildings, now called Lopez I and II, located in Aglipay St., Brgy Poblacion, Mandaluyong. In 1985, a two-storey four-room building was donated by a Chinese philanthropist, Mr. Tan Tian Huay, as one of the projects of the Federation of Philippine Chinese Chamber of Commerce and Industry.

In the late 1980s, a two-storey six-classroom building was constructed – the Abalos Building. In 1991, through the Educational Support Fund of the United States of America, the three-storey E.S.F. Building was built to adhere to the needs of the growing school population. In 1998, the Neptali Gonzales Administration Building, was constructed. In 2002 the four-storey 16-classroom Gonzales Building was built. The two-storey Abalos Building was demolished and a new four-storey 23-room Abalos Building was erected in 2005. In September 2008, the school received P900,000 from the City for the construction of a speech laboratory.

The school is now also used as a polling place.

== Admissions ==
First year enrollees are required to undergo an oral reading test for diagnostic and classification purposes and submit other documentation including a certificate of good moral character.

== Principals ==
- 1977–1993 Jesusa Ballesteros
- 1993–1999 Manuel Dingcong Jr.
- 1999–2004 Veneranda Raz
- 2003–2004 Maria Miguel (Officer-in-Charge)
- 2004 Erdelina Diaz (Officer-in-Charge)
- 2004–2007 Evangelina Diaz
- 2007 Maria Miguel (Officer-in-Charge)
- 2007 Alma Divina (Officer-in-Charge)
- 2007–2015 Rosarito Septimo
- 2015–2016 Victor Javeña (Officer-in-Charge)
- 2016–2021 Ervin Salazar
- 2021–2022 Aurelio Alfonso (Officer-in-Charge)
- 2022–2023 Roberto Redobante
- 2023–2025 Pompio Floro Jr.
- 2025–Present Corazon Regino

Miss Ederlinda G. Diaz, Education Supervisor in EPP/TLE was also designated as Officer In-charge Mrs. Alma D. Divina, Education Supervisor in English and then Officer In-charge (OIC) - Office of the Assistant Schools Division Superintendent (ASDS) also served as OIC before the designation of Mr. Rosarito Septimo.

== Levels ==
Junior High School ( JHS ) and Senior High School ( SHS ) by Grades 7 to 12
