= Mayor of Mandaluyong =

Local chief executive of Mandaluyong, Philippines

- Punong Lungsod ng Mandaluyong
- Seal of City of Mandaluyong

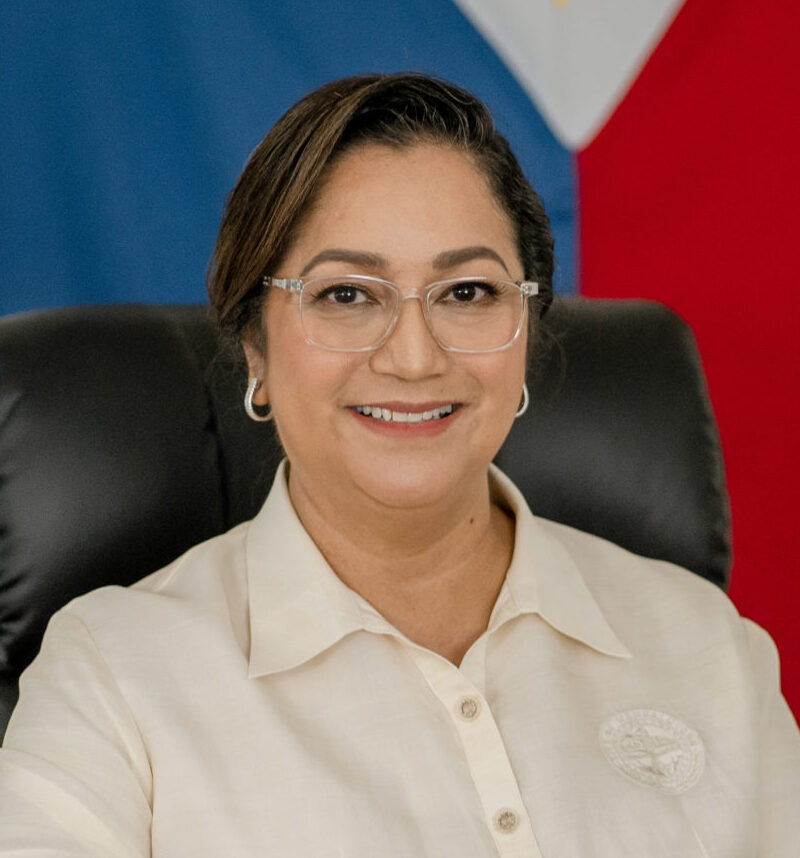
- Incumbent; Carmelita Abalos since June 30, 2025
- Style: Mayor, The Honorable
- Seat: Mandaluyong City Hall, Plainview
- Appointer: Elected via popular vote
- Term length: 3 years
- Inaugural holder: Buenaventura Domingo
- Formation: 1901

The mayor of Mandaluyong (Filipino: Punong Lungsod ng Mandaluyong) is the head of the executive branch of Mandaluyong's government. The mayor holds office at the Mandaluyong City Hall.

== History ==
The position was established as municipal president in 1901, the same year when San Felipe Neri (later renamed Mandaluyong in 1931) became part of the newly created province of Rizal. From 1903 to 1907, San Juan del Monte was placed under the administration of San Felipe Neri. The position was renamed to mayor during Isaac López's tenure in the 1935.

During World War II, President Manuel L. Quezon established the City of Greater Manila in 1942, which absorbed Mandaluyong and its municipal mayor became a district chief reporting to the city's Chief of the Division of Districts and of the District and Neighborhood Association. Mandaluyong Mayor Pedro Cruz served in this capacity. The City of Greater Manila was abolished on August 1, 1945, restoring Mandaluyong’s municipal status and the position of its mayor. Three military mayors occupied the position in 1945 before it was handed back to Cruz.

In 1975, Mandaluyong was incorporated into the newly created Metro Manila. Following the 1986 People Power Revolution, Benjamin Abalos was appointed by President Corazon Aquino as Officer-in-Charge, beginning a long-standing political tenure and family grip on the mayoralty. He would later serve as mayor from 1988 to 1998—thus becoming the first city mayor when Mandaluyong attained cityhood in 1995—and again from 2022 to 2025. The mayoralty was later held by his son Benhur (1998–2004; 2007–2016) and his daughter-in-law Menchie (2016–2022; since 2025), who became the first female mayor. The family's hold on the office saw two brief interruptions: Román de los Santos served as acting mayor from 1987 to 1988 and Abalos ally Neptali Gonzales II served as mayor from 2004 to 2007.

== List of mayors ==
#	Image	Mayor	Term Began	Term Ended	Deputy (later Vice Mayor)	Notes
Municipal President of San Felipe Neri, Province of Rizal
1		Buenaventura Domingo	1901	1901		First municipal president of San Felipe Neri
2		Dr. Antonio Fernando	1901	1902		
3		Januario Coronado	1902	1903		
4		Miguel Vergara	1903	1903		
5		Pantaleón Blas	1903	1903		Municipal president after the annexation of San Juan del Monte
6		Apolinar Coronado	1903	1907	José Colonel Sr. (1906–1916)	
7		Claro Castañeda	1907	1909	José Colonel Sr. (1906–1916)	Municipal president after the restoration of San Juan del Monte
8		Marcelo Lerma	1909	1909	José Colonel Sr. (1906–1916)	
*		Januario Coronado	1909	1912	José Colonel Sr. (1906–1916)	
*		Marcelo Lerma	1912	1916	José Colonel Sr. (1906–1916)	
9		Mariano Castañeda	1916	1922		
10		Clemente Fernando	1922	1925		
11		Gregorio Pedro	1925	1928		
Municipal President of Mandaluyong, Province of Rizal
*		Clemente Fernando	1928	1934	Isaac López (1928–1931)	Mandaluyong renamed from San Felipe Neri
12		Isaac López	1934	1937	Ponciano Enríquez (1934–1937)	
Municipal Mayor of Mandaluyong, Province of Rizal
*		Isaac López	1938	November 18, 1939	Ponciano Enríquez (1938–1939)	Municipal president, become first municipal mayor
13		Ponciano Enríquez	1939	1940	Amado T. Reyes (1939–1940)	
13		Ponciano Enríquez	1939	1940	José Colonel Sr. (1940–1941)	
*		Jorge Vargas	1941	1942		Mayor of the City of Greater Manila
*		León Guinto	1942	1944		Mayor of the City of Greater Manila
14		Pedro Cruz	1941	1945	Primo Guzmán (1941–1945)	District Chief of Mandaluyong under the City of Greater Manila (1941–1944)
15		Amado T. Reyes	February 9, 1945	February 11, 1945		First Military Mayor
16		Valente Garcia	February 11, 1945	April 4, 1945		Second Military Mayor
17		Primo Guzmán	April 4, 1945	August 31, 1945		Third Military Mayor
*		Pedro Cruz	September 1, 1946	June 30, 1946		
18		Bonifacio Javier	1946	1955		
*		Pedro Cruz	1956	1959		
*		Bonifacio Javier	1960	January 19, 1962	Amado T. Reyes (1960–1962)	
*		Amado T. Reyes	1962	October 21, 1963		
* Acting		Filemón Javier	1963	1963		
* Acting		Melchor Arcangel	1963	1963		
* Acting		Macario Trinidad	1963	1963		
19		Filemón Javier	January 1, 1964	December 31, 1971	Renato López (1964–1971)	
20		Renato López	January 1, 1972	1975	Teodoro Bernardo (1972–1974)	
20		Renato López	January 1, 1972	1975	Benito Francisco (1974–1975)	
Municipal Mayor of Mandaluyong, Metropolitan Manila
20		Renato López	1975	March 3, 1980	Benito Francisco (1975–1980)	
21		Ernesto Domingo	March 3, 1980	February 25, 1986	Soledad López (1980–1986)	
*		Benjamin Abalos Sr.	February 25, 1986	December 1, 1987		Officer-in-Charge mayor
*		Román de los Santos	December 5, 1987	February 2, 1988	Romeo Enriquez (1987–1988)	Officer-in-Charge mayor
22		Benjamin Abalos Sr.	February 2, 1988	1994	Ramon Guzmán (1988–1994)	
City Mayor of Mandaluyong, Metropolitan Manila
22		Benjamin Abalos Sr.	1994	June 30, 1998	Ramon Guzmán (1994–1995)	First city mayor in 1994
22		Benjamin Abalos Sr.	1994	June 30, 1998	Ernesto Domingo Jr. (1995–1998)	First city mayor in 1994
23		Benhur Abalos	June 30, 1998	June 30, 2004	Jesus C. Cruz (1998–2007)	
24		Neptali Gonzales II	June 30, 2004	June 30, 2007	Jesus C. Cruz (1998–2007)	
*		Benhur Abalos	June 30, 2007	June 30, 2016	Renato B. Sta. Maria (2007–2010)	
*		Benhur Abalos	June 30, 2007	June 30, 2016	Danilo L. De Guzman (2010–2013)	
*		Benhur Abalos	June 30, 2007	June 30, 2016	Edward Bartolome (2013–2016)	
25		Carmelita Abalos	June 30, 2016	June 30, 2022	Antonio D. Suva (2016–2022)	First female mayor
*		Benjamin Abalos Sr.	June 30, 2022	June 30, 2025	Carmelita Abalos (2022–2025)	
*		Carmelita Abalos	June 30, 2025	present	Antonio D. Suva (2025–present)	

== Elections ==
- 1995 Mandaluyong local elections
- 1998 Mandaluyong local elections
- 2001 Mandaluyong local elections
- 2004 Mandaluyong local elections
- 2007 Mandaluyong local elections
- 2010 Mandaluyong local elections
- 2013 Mandaluyong local elections
- 2016 Mandaluyong local elections
- 2019 Mandaluyong local elections
- 2022 Mandaluyong local elections
- 2025 Mandaluyong local elections
