= 2025 Mandaluyong local elections =

11th City elections in Mandaluyong

- May 12, 2025
- Mayoral election
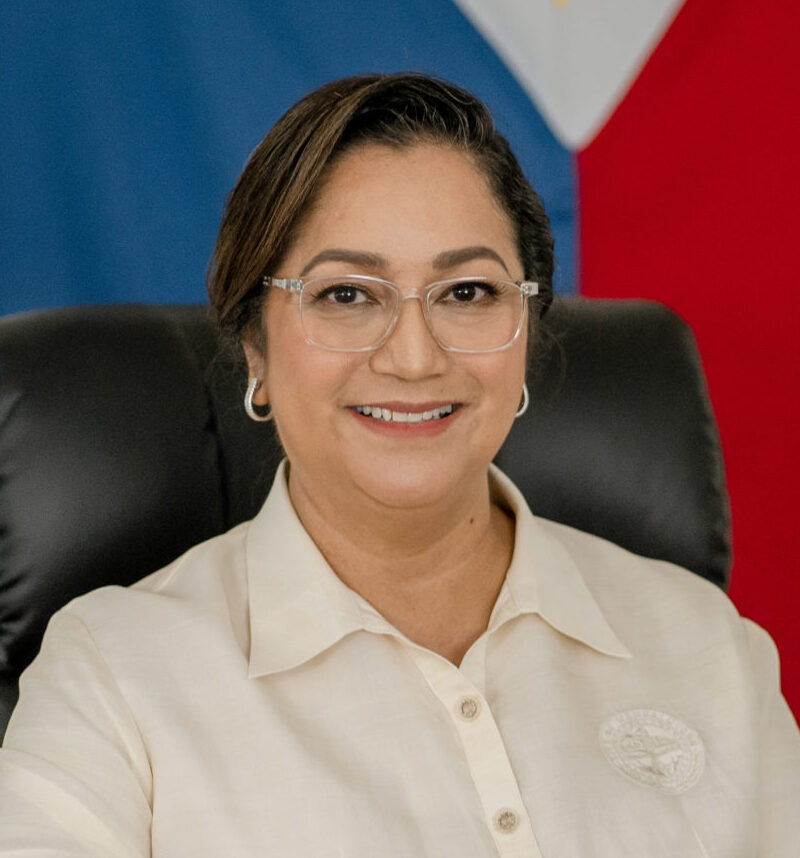
Candidate	Carmelita Abalos
Party	PFP
Running mate	Anthony Suva
Popular vote	143,315
Percentage	100.00%
Mayor before election
Benjamin Abalos
PFP
Elected Mayor
Carmelita Abalos
PFP
- Vice mayoral election
Candidate	Anthony Suva
Party	PFP
Popular vote	134,572
Percentage	100.00%
Vice Mayor before election
Carmelita Abalos
PDP–Laban
Elected Vice Mayor
Anthony Suva
PFP
- City Council election

12 of 14 seats in the Mandaluyong City Council 8 seats needed for a majority
	First party	Second party	Third party
Party	PFP	PDP	Aksyon
Last election	Did not contest	8 seats, 57.97%	1 seat, 8.83%
Seats won	11	1	0
Seat change	▲11	▼7	▼1
Popular vote	576,355	51,984	32,037
Percentage	78.82%	7.11%	4.38%

Local elections were held in Mandaluyong on May 12, 2025, as part of the 2025 Philippine general election. The electorate will elect a mayor, a vice mayor, 12 members of the Mandaluyong City Council, and district representative to the House of Representatives of the Philippines. The officials elected in the election will assume their respective offices on June 30, 2025, for a three-year-long term.

== Background ==
Incumbent Mayor Benjamin Abalos did not seek reelection as mayor for a second term. While Carmelita Abalos was eligible to run for vice mayor supposedly for a second term, she instead ran again for mayor.

== Result ==
=== Mayor ===
Incumbent Benjamin Abalos (Partido Federal ng Pilipinas) is retiring. Abalos was elected under PDP–Laban with 84.84% of the vote in 2022. Carmelita Abalos won elected for a first term unopposed.

Candidate	Party	Votes	%
Carmelita Abalos	Partido Federal ng Pilipinas	143,315	100.00
Total		143,315	100.00
Source: Commission on Elections

=== Vice mayor ===
Incumbent Carmelita Abalos (Partido Federal ng Pilipinas) is running for mayor of Mandaluyong. Abalos was elected under PDP–Laban unopposed in 2022.

Candidate	Party	Votes	%
Anthony Suva	Partido Federal ng Pilipinas	134,572	100.00
Total		134,572	100.00
Source: Commission on Elections

=== Congressional election ===
Incumbent Neptali Gonzales II (National Unity Party) is retiring. He was re-elected with 78.18% of the vote in 2022.

Candidate	Party	Votes	%
Alexandria Gonzales	National Unity Party	141,464	100.00
Total		141,464	100.00
Source: Commission on Elections

=== City council elections ===
The Mandaluyong City Council is composed of 14 councilors, 12 of whom are elected.

Party	Votes	%	Seats
Partido Federal ng Pilipinas	576,355	78.82	11
Independent	70,847	9.69	0
Partido Demokratiko Pilipino	51,981	7.11	1
Aksyon Demokratiko	32,037	4.38	0
Total	731,220	100.00	12

==== First district ====
Mandaluyong's 1st councilor district consists of the barangays of Addition Hills, Bagong Silang, Burol, Daang Bakal, Hagdan Bato Itaas, Hagdan Bato Libis, Harapin Ang Bukas, Highway Hills, Mauway, New Zañiga, Pag-Asa, Pleasant Hills, Poblacion and Wack-Wack Greenhills. Six councilors are elected from this councilor district.

Candidate	Party	Votes	%
Charisse Abalos	Partido Federal ng Pilipinas	78,830	77.36
Elton Yap (incumbent)	Partido Federal ng Pilipinas	71,520	70.19
Danny de Guzman (incumbent)	Partido Federal ng Pilipinas	65,250	64.04
Mariz Manalo (incumbent)	Partido Federal ng Pilipinas	58,994	57.90
Grace Antonio	Partido Federal ng Pilipinas	58,802	57.71
Junis Alim (incumbent)	Partido Federal ng Pilipinas	50,992	50.04
Chris Tan	Independent	26,130	25.64
Rolando Cristobal	Independent	11,356	11.14
Florencio Solomon	Independent	10,466	10.27
Delmer del Rosario	Independent	10,268	10.08
Total		442,608	100.00
Source: Commission on Elections

==== Second district ====
Mandaluyong's 2nd councilor district consists of the barangays of Barangka Drive, Barangka Ibaba, Barangka Ilaya, Barangka Itaas, Buayang Bato, Hulo, Mabini–J.Rizal, Malamig, Namayan, Old Zañiga, Plainview, San Jose and Vergara. Six councilors are elected from this councilor district.

Candidate	Party	Votes	%
Benjie Abalos (incumbent)	Partido Federal ng Pilipinas	45,959	66.27
Alex Santa Maria (incumbent)	Partido Federal ng Pilipinas	42,626	61.47
Botong Gonzales Cuejilo (incumbent)	Partido Federal ng Pilipinas	35,788	51.61
Dong Ocampo	Partido Demokratiko Pilipino	34,818	50.21
Regie Antiojo (incumbent)	Partido Federal ng Pilipinas	34,186	49.30
Leslie Cruz (incumbent)	Partido Federal ng Pilipinas	33,408	48.18
Boyett Bacar	Aksyon Demokratiko	32,037	46.20
Boy de Quinto	Partido Demokratiko Pilipino	17,166	24.75
Darius Apacionado	Independent	12,627	18.21
Total		288,615	100.00
Source: Commission on Elections
