= 2016 Mandaluyong local elections =

8th City elections in Mandaluyong

2016 Mandaluyong mayoral elections
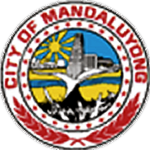
- May 9, 2016
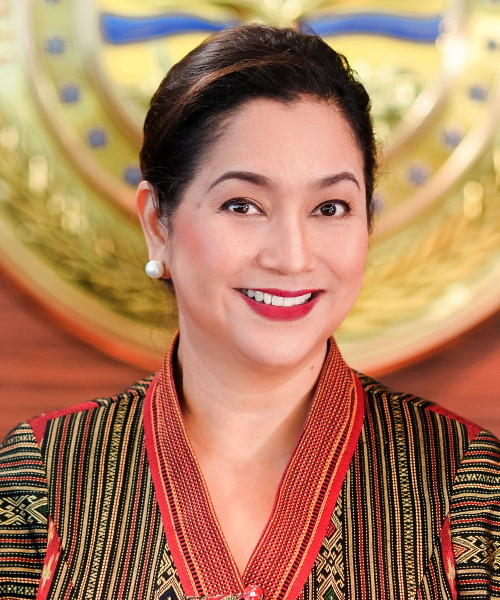

Nominee	Carmelita Abalos	Georgie Antonio
Party	UNA	PMP
Running mate	Anthony Suva	Danny De Guzman (Aksyon)
Popular vote	118,077	24,501
Percentage	81.34	16.88
Mayor before election
Benhur Abalos
UNA
Elected mayor
Carmelita Abalos
UNA
- Vice mayoral election
Candidate	Anthony Suva	Edward Bartolome	Danny De Guzman
Party	UNA	Liberal	Aksyon
Popular vote	65,412	43,124	12,267
Percentage	54.15%	35.70%	10.15%
Vice Mayor before election
Edward Bartolome
Liberal
Elected Vice Mayor
Anthony Suva
UNA

Local elections were held in Mandaluyong on May 9, 2016, within the Philippine general election. The voters elected for the elective local posts in the city: the mayor, vice mayor, one Congressman, and the councilors, six in each of the city's two legislative districts.

== Background ==
The wives of the current city officials, will be running in their husbands' respective positions in the city. Carmelita Abalos, wife of Mayor Benhur Abalos will run for the Mayoralty position under the United Nationalist Alliance. Meanwhile, former ABC reporter Queenie Gonzales, wife of Representative Neptali Gonzales II will run as the representative of lone district of the city under the Liberal Party, one of her opponents is Reyes Barbecue president Francisco Reyes, an independent candidate.

== Candidates ==
=== Mayor ===
Mayor Benhur Abalos' wife, Carmelita won the elections.

Mandaluyong Mayoralty Election
Party	Candidate	Votes	%
UNA	Carmelita "Menchie" Abalos	118,077	81.34
PMP	Georgie Antonio	24,501	16.88
Independent	Florencio Solomon	2,592	1.79
Total votes		145,170	100.00

=== Vice Mayor ===
Edward Bartolome is the incumbent. His opponents are First District Councilor Anthony Suva and former Vice Mayor Danny De Guzman.

Mandaluyong Vice Mayoralty Election
Party	Candidate	Votes	%
UNA	Anthony Suva	65,412	54.15
Liberal	Edward Bartolome	43,124	35.70
Aksyon	Danny De Guzman	12,267	10.15
Total votes		120,803	100.00

=== Representative, Lone District ===
Neptali "Boyet" Gonzales II is term-limited. His party nominated his wife, former ABC reporter Queenie Gonzales. Her main opponents are Reyes Barbecue president Francisco Reyes (running as independent), Albert Yap (also running independent) and Jack Ramel (running under PDP–Laban).

2016 Philippine House of Representatives election in Mandaluyong's Lone District
Party	Candidate	Votes	%
Liberal	Alexandra "Queenie" Gonzales	122,792	88.95
Independent	Francisco Reyes	9,543	6.91
PDP–Laban	Jack Ramel	4,147	3.01
Independent	Albert Yap	1,560	1.13
Valid ballots		138,042	88.81
Invalid or blank votes		17,391	11.19
Total votes		155,433	100.00
Liberal hold			

=== Councilors ===
==== 1st District ====
2016 Mandaluyong 1st district council election
Party	Candidate	Votes	%
UNA	Charisse Marie Abalos	72,414	
Liberal	Ayla Alim	63,341	
PMP	Grace Antonio	50,682	
NPC	Louie Espinosa	47,727	
NPC	Rodolfo Posadas	45,312	
UNA	Brando Dominguez	39,139	
NPC	Edmon Espiritu	38,400	
PMP	Lito De Guzman	29,103	
PMP	Lei Esteban	19,228	
Independent	Manuel Ballelos, Jr.	6,113	
Aksyon	Emelito Custodio	5,740	
Aksyon	Bojie Caldino	5,202	
Total votes			

==== 2nd District ====
2016 Mandaluyong 2nd district council election
Party	Candidate	Votes	%
Liberal	Alex Sta. Maria	44,036	
NPC	Boy Esteban	40,510	
Liberal	Jesse Cruz	40,072	
Independent	Boyett Bacar	39,229	
NPC	Che-Che Pablo-Santos	38,127	
UNA	Fernando Ocampo	32,929	
Independent	Hazel Razote	28,642	
PMP	Julio De Quinto	9,023	
PDP–Laban	Ed Geronimo	7,899	
PMP	Bay Guisando	5,824	
PMP	Mark Valenzuela	5,067	
Independent	Katherine Reglo	3,866	
Aksyon	John Michael Taronas	2,726	
Aksyon	Juan Almonicar	2,345	
Total votes			
