= Administrative divisions of Metro Manila =

Metro Manila, the capital region of the Philippines, is a large metropolitan area that has several levels of subdivisions. Administratively, the region is divided into seventeen primary local government units with their own separate elected mayors and councils who are coordinated by the Metropolitan Manila Development Authority, a national government agency headed by a chairperson directly appointed by the Philippine president. The cities and municipality that form the region's local government units are further divided into several barangays or villages (formerly called barrios) which are headed by an elected barangay captain and barangay council.

The region as a whole is geographically divided into four districts, of which the first district is the central capital City of Manila, the second and third districts located to the east and north of the City, respectively, and the fourth district covering the remaining areas of the region south of the City and the Pasig River.

== Districts ==
Unlike other administrative regions in the Philippines, Metro Manila is not composed of provinces. Instead, the region is divided into four geographic areas called "districts." The districts have their district centers at the four original cities in the region: the city-district of Manila (Capital District), Quezon City (Eastern Manila), Caloocan (Northern Manila, also informally known as Camanava), and Pasay (Southern Manila). The districts serve mainly to organize the region's local government units for fiscal and statistical purposes.

Districts of Metro Manila

Districts of Metro Manila
District	Cities/Municipality	Population (2024)	Area
Capital District (1st District)	Manila	1,902,590	42.34 km^{2} (16.35 sq mi)
Eastern Manila District (2nd District)	Mandaluyong; Marikina; Pasig; Quezon City; San Juan	5,008,857	236.36 km^{2} (91.26 sq mi)
Northern Manila District (Camanava) (3rd District)	Caloocan; Malabon; Navotas; Valenzuela	3,080,925	126.42 km^{2} (48.81 sq mi)
Southern Manila District (4th District)	Las Piñas; Makati; Muntinlupa; Parañaque; Pasay; Pateros; Taguig	4,009,379	208.28 km^{2} (80.42 sq mi)
Metro Manila		14,001,751	636.00 km^{2} (245.56 sq mi)
Sources: Population; Land area; Pateros area

== Cities and municipality ==
=== Administrative divisions ===
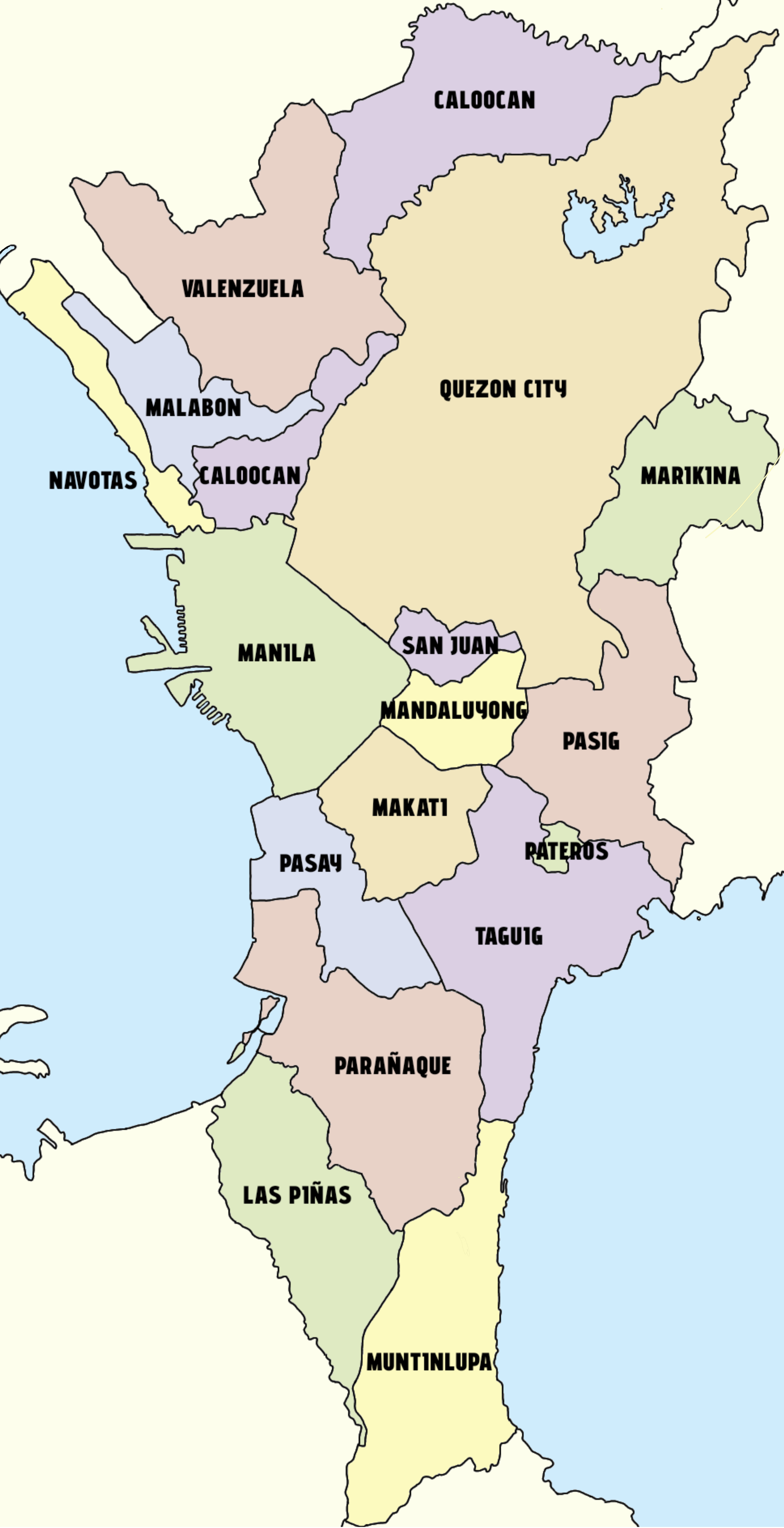
Map of Metro Manila with NAMRIA-drawn boundaries.

The political and administrative boundaries of the National Capital Region has not changed since its formation in 1975 as a public corporation under Presidential Decree No. 824. They are composed of sixteen independent cities, classified as highly urbanized cities, and one independent municipality: Pateros.

- † Regional center

City or municipality	Population (2020)		Area^{[a]}		Density		Incorporated (city)
			km^{2}	sq mi	/km^{2}	/sq mi	
Caloocan	12.3%	1,661,584	53.33	20.59	31,000	80,000	1962
Las Piñas	4.5%	606,293	32.02	12.36	19,000	49,000	1997
Makati	4.7%	629,616	27.36	10.56	23,000	60,000	1995
Malabon	2.8%	380,522	15.96	6.16	24,000	62,000	2001
Mandaluyong	3.2%	425,758	11.06	4.27	38,000	98,000	1994
† Manila	13.7%	1,846,513	42.88	16.56	43,000	110,000	1571
Marikina	3.4%	456,059	22.64	8.74	20,000	52,000	1996
Muntinlupa	4.0%	543,445	41.67	16.09	13,000	34,000	1995
Navotas	1.8%	247,543	11.51	4.44	22,000	57,000	2007
Parañaque	5.1%	689,992	47.28	18.25	15,000	39,000	1998
Pasay	3.3%	440,656	18.64	7.20	24,000	62,000	1947
Pasig	6.0%	803,159	31.46	12.15	26,000	67,000	1995
Pateros	0.5%	65,227	1.76	0.68^{[b]}	37,000	96,000	1909 (Not a city)
Quezon City	22.0%	2,960,048	161.11	62.20	18,000	47,000	1939
San Juan	0.9%	126,347	5.87	2.27	22,000	57,000	2007
Taguig	6.6%	886,722	45.18	17.44	20,000	52,000	2004
Valenzuela	5.3%	714,978	45.75	17.66	16,000	41,000	1998
Total		13,484,462	619.57	239.22	22,000	57,000	
1. Land area figures are from the Philippine Institute of Volcanology and Seismology and Geoscience Australia.; 2. Land area of Pateros from the Municipality of Pateros official government website.

== Barangays ==
The cities and municipality of Metro Manila are divided into barangays with populations ranging from under 1,000 to over 200,000. In the City of Manila, Caloocan and Pasay, the barangays are grouped into zones for strategical purposes. As of 2015, there are 1,710 barangays in Metro Manila.

== Other divisions ==
=== Congressional districts ===
In terms of congressional representation, the region has 32 congressional districts with each city comprising one or more districts. The lone municipality of Pateros shares a congressional district with the first district of Taguig.

Congressional districts of Metro Manila
City / Municipality	District	Area (km^{2})	Population (2020)	Electorate (2022)	Representative (20th Congress)	Party
Caloocan	1st	34,86	953,125	342,766	Oscar Malapitan	Nacionalista
Caloocan	2nd	8.40	381,690	233,294	Edgar Erice	Liberal
Caloocan	3rd	12.54	327,769	124,219	Dean Asistio	Lakas–CMD
Las Piñas	Lone	32.69	606,293	291,074	Mark Anthony Santos	Independent
Makati	1st	16.31	254,600	209,859	Monique Lagdameo	MKTZNU
Makati	2nd	15.65	375,016	248,503	Alden Almario	MKTZNU
Malabon	Lone	15.71	380,522	258,115	Antolin Oreta III	NUP
Mandaluyong	Lone	21.26	425,758	232,492	Alexandria Gonzales	NUP
Manila	1st	4.57	441,282	264,362	Ernix Dionisio	NUP
Manila	2nd	4.08	212,938	152,929	Rolando Valeriano	NUP
Manila	3rd	6.24	220,029	164,664	Joel Chua	NUP
Manila	4th	5.14	388,305	162,767	Giselle Maceda	NPC
Manila	5th	11.56	395,065	217,787	Irwin Tieng	NUP
Manila	6th	7.79	300,186	170,533	Benny Abante	NUP
Marikina	1st	9.03	174,892	114,298	Marcelino Teodoro	NUP
Marikina	2nd	13.62	281,167	146,451	Miro Quimbo	PFP
Muntinlupa	Lone	39.75	543,445	311,750	Jaime Fresnedi	Liberal
Navotas	Lone	10.77	247,543	150,693	Toby Tiangco	Navoteño
Parañaque	1st	17.06	265,839	142,815	Eric Olivarez	Lakas–CMD
Parañaque	2nd	27.99	424,153	203,263	Brian Yamsuan	NUP
Pasay	Lone	13.97	440,656	276,579	Antonino Calixto	Lakas–CMD
Pasig	Lone	48.46	803,159	457,370	Roman Romulo	NPC
Pateros–Taguig	Lone	20.61	484,906	227,906	Ading Cruz	Nacionalista
Quezon City	1st	19.59	384,384	224,351	Arjo Atayde	NUP
Quezon City	2nd	19.59	738,238	309,300	Ralph Tulfo	PFP
Quezon City	3rd	46.27	319,371	161,366	Franz Pumaren	NUP
Quezon City	4th	23.42	407,402	210,720	Bong Suntay	UNA
Quezon City	5th	28.03	596,047	264,130	Patrick Michael Vargas	PFP
Quezon City	6th	21.97	514,516	234,028	Marivic Co-Pilar	NUP
San Juan	Lone	5.95	126,347	109,240	Bel Zamora	Lakas–CMD
Taguig	Lone	24.6	467,043	249,644	Jorge Daniel Bacobo	Nacionalista
Valenzuela	1st	25.82	360,894	199,294	Kenneth Gatchalian	NPC
Valenzuela	2nd	18.69	354,084	244,317	Gerald Galang	Lakas–CMD
Total		619.57	13,484,462	7,310,879	Total	

=== Council districts ===
In terms of Sangguniang Panlungsod (city council, or in the case of Pateros, Sangguniang Bayan or municipal council) representation, each city is divided into city or municipal council districts. These are coextensive to congressional districts above, except that those cities that elect their representative at-large (Las Piñas, Malabon, Mandaluyong, Muntinlupa, Navotas, Pasay, Pasig and San Juan) their city council representation is divided into two districts.

For Taguig, its two congressional districts, with the first district taken without Pateros, are used to determine representation to its city council. For Pateros, it is divided into two districts, independent of Taguig.

Each district sends in an equal number of councilors.

=== Old districts ===
Metro Manila cities may also be divided into traditional districts, such as the former municipalities (now city districts) that make up the City of Manila and the historical municipalities and estates like Novaliches, Balintawak, San Francisco del Monte and Diliman that were amalgamated to form Quezon City. Neither division has its own government. In Pasay, traditional districts include Malibay, Santa Clara, San Rafael and Maricaban.

=== Gated communities ===
Some cities in Metro Manila may also be divided into several gated communities, also known as subdivisions, which may or may not constitute their own barangays or low-level local government units. Some examples are: Dasmariñas Village in Makati; Ayala Alabang in Muntinlupa; Marina Bay, Merville, Tahanan Village and Better Living Subdivision in Parañaque; Greenhills in San Juan; La Vista, White Plains, BF Homes, Greenmeadows and Filinvest Homes in Quezon City.

== Historical divisions ==
=== Before 1901 ===
Before 1901, the Province of Manila which today encompasses most of Metro Manila and the northern part of the neighboring province of Rizal was divided into 24 municipalities with Intramuros (then known as Manila) as its capital.

=== 1901–1942 ===
Except for the City of Manila which amalgamated six smaller municipalities in June 1901, the Province of Manila was absorbed by the newly created Province of Rizal with Pasig as its provincial capital.

=== 1942–1947 ===
The City of Greater Manila was formed in January 1942 combining the City of Manila and Quezon City, as well as six other municipalities from Rizal: Caloocan, Makati, Mandaluyong, Parañaque, Pasay and San Juan.

=== 1947–1975 ===
The seven municipalities of the City of Greater Manila were restored and reorganized under the Province of Rizal.

In November 1975 through Presidential Decree No. 824, Metropolitan Manila was created out of four cities and thirteen municipalities (twelve from the province of Rizal and the municipality of Valenzuela from Bulacan) which covers the present-day territory of Metro Manila. It was declared the National Capital Region of the Philippines in June 1978.
