= 2013 Mandaluyong local elections =

7th City elections in Mandaluyong

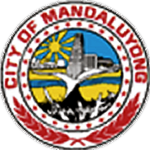
- May 13, 2013
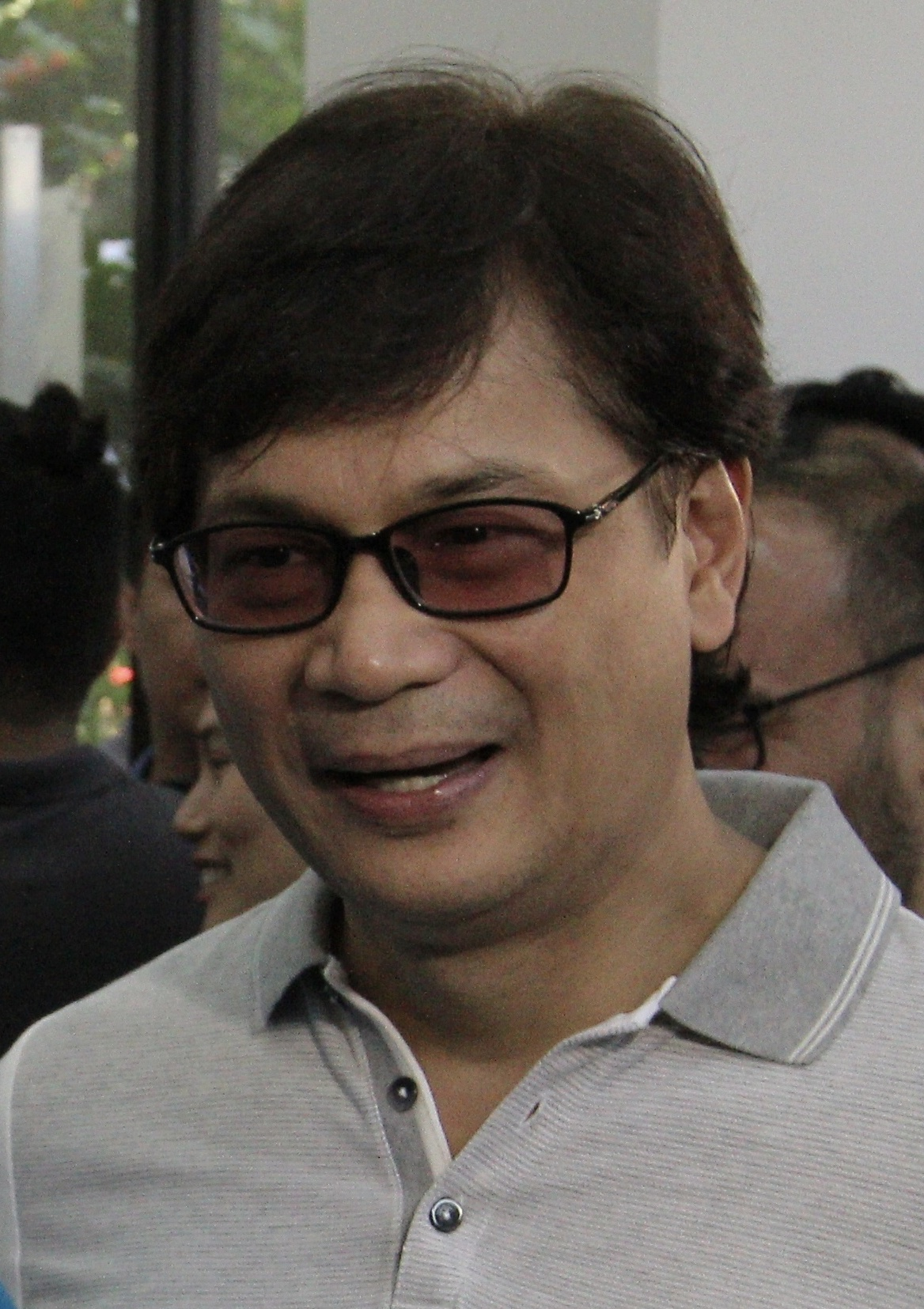
Candidate	Benjamin Abalos Jr.	Danilo "Danny" de Guzman
Party	Lakas–Kampi	Aksyon
Popular vote	62,273	28,621
Percentage	68.51	31.49
Mayor before election
Benjamin Abalos Jr.
Lakas–Kampi
Elected mayor
Benjamin Abalos Jr.
Lakas–Kampi
- Vice mayoral election
Candidate	Edward Bartolome	Doki Pe
Party	Liberal	Independent
Popular vote	72,345	28,215
Percentage	71.94%	28.06%
Vice Mayor before election
Danilo de Guzman
Aksyon
Elected Vice Mayor
Edward Bartolome
Liberal

Local elections in Mandaluyong was held on May 13, 2013 within the Philippine general election. The voters elected for the elective local posts in the city: the mayor, vice mayor, one Congressman, and the councilors, six in each of the city's two legislative districts.

== Background ==
Mayor Benjamin "Benhur" Abalos Jr. sought re-election for a third and final term under Lakas-CMD. He faced Vice Mayor Danilo "Danny" de Guzman of Aksyon Demokratiko, and independent candidate Florencio Solomon.

Vice Mayor Danilo "Danny" de Guzman ran for mayor. His party slated no candidate for the position. His position was contested by Councilor Edward Bartolome of Liberal Party and independent candidate Doki Pe.

Rep. Neptali "Boyet" Gonzales II ran for re-election for third and final term. He faced candidates Frank Reyes of Ang Kapatiran, and independents Gerard Castillo and Renato Parem.

== Results ==
=== For Mayor ===
Mayor Benjamin "Benhur" Abalos Jr. won against Vice Mayor Danilo "Danny" de Guzman.

Mandaluyong Mayoral Elections
Party	Candidate	Votes	%
Lakas	Benjamin "Benhur" Abalos Jr.	62,273	68.55
Aksyon	Danny de Guzman	34,975	31.06
Independent	Florencio Solomon	434	0.39
Total votes		112,592	100.00
Lakas hold			

Popular vote percentage
Abalos	68.55%
de Guzman	31.06%
Solomon	0.39%

=== For Vice Mayor ===
Second District Councilor Edward Bartolome won against independent candidate Doki Pe.

Mandaluyong Vice Mayoral Elections
Party	Candidate	Votes	%
Liberal	Edward Bartolome	72,345	71.94
Independent	Doki Pe	28,215	28.06
Total votes		100,560	100.00
Liberal gain from Aksyon			

Popular vote percentage
Bartolome	71.94%
Pe	28.06%

=== For Representative ===
Rep. Neptali Gonzales II overwhelmingly won against his fellow candidates Frank Reyes, Gerard Castillo and Renato Parem.

Congressional Elections in Mandaluyong's Lone District
Party	Candidate	Votes	%
Liberal	Neptali "Boyet" Gonzales II	92,950	89.03
Ang Kapatiran	Frank Reyes	9,522	9.12
Independent	Gerard Castillo	1,511	1.45
Independent	Renato Parem	423	0.41
Total votes		104,406	100.00
Liberal hold			

Popular vote percentage
Gonzales	89.03%
Reyes	9.12%
Others	1.86%

=== For Councilors ===
==== First District ====
City Council Elections in Mandaluyong's First District
Party	Candidate	Votes	%
Lakas	Charisse Abalos	49,144	
Lakas	Anthony Suva	45,177	
UNA	Grace Antonio	37,818	
Liberal	Ayla Alim	37,335	
Liberal	Alex Santos	34,187	
NPC	Louie Espinosa	32,443	
Liberal	Berong Servillon	27,861	
Independent	Lito De Guzman	18,988	
Independent	Darius Razon Apacionado	14,954	
Independent	Gloria Pilos-Quintos	13,384	
Independent	Willy Talag	11,812	
Independent	Ed Panoso	11,533	
Independent	Edgar Manood	9,326	
Independent	Severino Bargola Sr.	3,541	
Independent	Gabino Labastida Jr.	1,397	
Independent	Bojie Caldino	1,090	
Total votes			100.00

Second District

City Council Elections in Mandaluyong's Second District
Party	Candidate	Votes	%
Liberal	Alex Sta. Maria	26,835	
Liberal	Jesse Cruz	25,136	
NPC	Cheche Pablo-Santos	23,291	
Lakas	Boy Esteban	22,989	
Lakas	Dong Ocampo	21,807	
Independent	Roehl Bacar	21,047	
Lakas	Jess Garcia	20,652	
Independent	Hazel Razote	15,305	
Independent	Lyn Francisco	11,402	
Independent	Boy De Quinto	7,382	
Independent	Felipe Camacho Jr.	3,909	
Independent	Dave Vergel Castro	3,638	
Independent	Eduardo Geronimo Jr.	3,514	
Independent	Erning Cruz	3,175	
Independent	Boy Perez	834	
Total votes			100.00
