= 2019 Mandaluyong local elections =

9th City elections in Mandaluyong

2019 Mandaluyong mayoral election
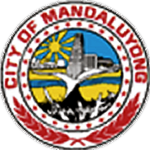
- May 13, 2019
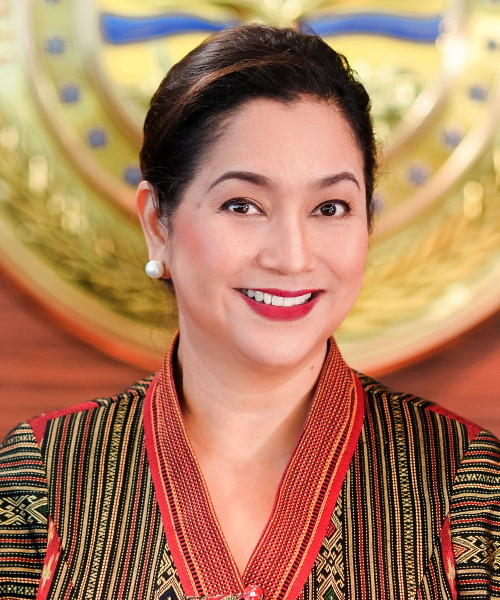

Nominee	Carmelita Abalos	Florencio Solomon
Party	PDP–Laban	Independent
Running mate	Anthony Suva
Popular vote	128,661	8,589
Percentage	94.00	6.00
Mayor before election
Carmelita Abalos
PDP–Laban
Elected mayor
Carmelita Abalos
PDP–Laban
- Vice mayoral election
Candidate	Anthony Suva	Boy de Quinto
Party	PDP–Laban	PFP
Popular vote	111,922	18,981
Percentage	85.00%	15.00%
Vice Mayor before election
Anthony Suva
PDP–Laban
Elected Vice Mayor
Anthony Suva
PDP–Laban

Local elections in Mandaluyong were held on May 13, 2019, within the Philippine general election. The voters elected for the elective local posts in the city: the mayor, vice mayor, one Congressman, and the councilors, six in each of the city's two legislative districts.

== Background ==
Then-mayor Carmelita Abalos was elected in 2016 and sought for reelection. Independent candidate Florencio Solomon challenged Abalos for the top post.

== Results ==
Abalos easily won re-election as mayor with 128,661 votes against her opponent's 8,589 votes. Her running mate Suva won re-election as vice-mayor with 111,922 votes against his opponent's 18,981 votes.

=== Mayoral election ===
Mandaluyong mayoral election
Party	Candidate	Votes	%
PDP–Laban	Carmelita Abalos	128,661	94.00
Independent	Florencio Solomon	8,589	6.00
Total votes		137,250	100.00
PDP–Laban hold			

=== Vice Mayoral election ===
Mandaluyong vice mayoral election
Party	Candidate	Votes	%
PDP–Laban	Anthony Suva	111,922	85.00
PFP	Boy de Quinto	18,981	15.00
Total votes		130,903	100.00
PDP–Laban hold			

=== Congressional election ===
2019 Philippine House of Representatives election in Mandaluyong's Lone District
Party	Candidate	Votes	%
PDP–Laban	Boyet Gonzales	127,268	100.00
Total votes		127,268	100.00
PDP–Laban hold			

=== Council elections ===
==== 1st District ====
Mandaluyong Council election - 1st District
Party	Candidate	Votes	%
PDP–Laban	Charisse Abalos	73,915	18.00
PDP–Laban	Elton Yap	58,272	14.00
Aksyon	Danny de Guzman	54,690	13.00
Independent	Grace Antonio	54,221	13.00
PDP–Laban	Kuyog Posadas	54,057	13.00
PDP–Laban	Junis Alim	44,525	11.00
PDP–Laban	Edmond Espiritu	43,109	10.00
Independent	Adonis Bacarra	11,063	3.00
Aksyon	Adel Inocentes	8,441	2.00
Independent	Manuel Ballelos Jr.	5,884	1.00
Independent	William Belaro	5,219	1.00
Total votes		413,396	100.00

==== 2nd District ====
Mandaluyong Council election - 2nd District
Party	Candidate	Votes	%
PDP–Laban	Benjie Abalos	44,635	16.00
PDP–Laban	Che-Che Pablo-Santos	42,035	16.00
PDP–Laban	Boyett Bacar	40,653	15.00
PDP–Laban	Jesse Cruz	40,288	15.00
PDP–Laban	Dong Ocampo	40,172	15.00
PDP–Laban	Botong Cuejilo	29,089	11.00
PFP	Kaed Geronimo	10,459	4.00
Aksyon	Oca Cadag	9,801	4.00
PFP	Toto Alcibar	5,901	2.00
PFP	Liberty Carlos	5,353	2.00
Total votes		268,386	100.00
