= 2022 Mandaluyong local elections =

10th City elections in Mandaluyong

2022 Mandaluyong mayoral elections
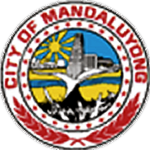
- May 9, 2022
- Mayoral election
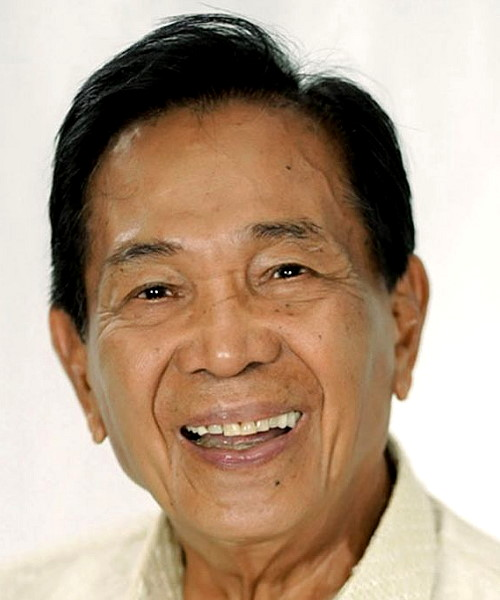
		IND
Nominee	Benjamin Abalos	Florencio Solomon
Party	PDP–Laban	Independent
Running mate	Carmelita Abalos
Popular vote	137,713	24,620
Percentage	84.83	15.17
- Vice mayoral election
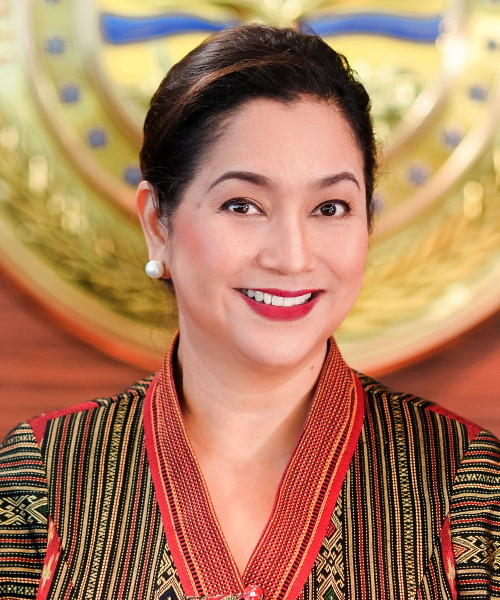
Nominee	Carmelita Abalos
Party	PDP–Laban
Popular vote	149,643
Percentage	100.00
Mayor before election
Carmelita Abalos
PDP–Laban
Elected mayor
Benjamin Abalos
PDP–Laban

Local elections in Mandaluyong was held on May 9, 2022 within the Philippine general election. The voters elected for the elective local posts in the city: the mayor, vice mayor, one Congressman, and the councilors, six in each of the city's two legislative districts.

== Background ==
Incumbents Carmelita Abalos and Anthony Suva are on their second term as Mayor and Vice Mayor of Mandaluyong, respectively; they are thus eligible for a third and final term. On September 23, 2021, Abalos had initially declared her intention to seek reelection, with Suva as her running mate. However, she gave way to her father-in-law, Benjamin Abalos Sr., and would instead run as his running mate for vice mayor. Suva would instead run for councilor from the 1st District. Abalos Sr. served as mayor from 1986 to 1987 as officer-in-charge and from 1988 to 1998. Incumbent Representative and Deputy Speaker Neptali Gonzales II ran for reelection against incumbent 2nd District Councilor Boyett Bacar.

== Tickets ==
=== Administration coalition ===
Team Performance
#	Name	Party
For House Of Representatives
2.	Neptali Gonzales II	NUP
For Mayor
1.	Benjamin Abalos Sr.	PDP–Laban
For Vice Mayor
1.	Carmelita Abalos	PDP–Laban
For Councilor (1st District)
1.	Junis Alim	PDP–Laban
3.	Miguel Carlos Aquino	PDP–Laban
5.	Danny de Guzman	Aksyon
7.	Rodolfo Posadas	PDP–Laban
9.	Anthony Suva	PDP–Laban
10.	Elton Yap	PDP–Laban
For Councilor (2nd District)
1.	Benjamin Abalos III	PDP–Laban
4.	Leslie Cruz	PDP–Laban
5.	Botong Gonzales Cuejilo	Nacionalista
8.	Marco Merza	Independent
9.	Mike Ocampo	PDP–Laban
10.	Alex Sta. Maria	PDP–Laban

=== Aksyon Demokratiko ===
Aksyon Demokratiko
#	Name	Party
For House Of Representatives
1.	Boyett Bacar	Aksyon

=== Partido Federal ng Pilipinas ===
Partido Federal ng Pilipinas
#	Name	Party
For Councilor (1st District)
2.	MJ Angga	PFP
8.	Fermin Romualdez	PFP

=== Independent ===
Independent
#	Name	Party
For Mayor
2.	Florencio Solomon	Independent
For Councilor (1st District)
4.	Romeo Cabus	Independent
6.	Mariz Manalo	Independent
For Councilor (2nd District)
2.	Regie Antiojo	Independent
3.	Josh Bacar	Independent
6.	Eduardo Geronimo Jr.	Independent
7.	Rogie Gonzales	Independent

== Results ==
=== Mayoral election ===
Mandaluyong Mayoral election
Party	Candidate	Votes	%
PDP–Laban	Benjamin Abalos	137,713	84.83
Independent	Florencio Solomon	24,620	15.17
Total votes		161,333	100.00
PDP–Laban hold			

=== Vice Mayoral election ===
Mandaluyong Vice Mayoral election
Party	Candidate	Votes	%
PDP–Laban	Carmelita Abalos	149,643	100.00
Total votes		149,643	100.00
PDP–Laban hold			

=== Congressional election ===
2022 Philippine House of Representatives election in Mandaluyong's Lone District
Party	Candidate	Votes	%
NUP	Neptali Gonzales II (Incumbent)	132,558	78.18
Aksyon	Boyett Bacar	36,998	21.82
Total votes		169,556	100.00
NUP hold			

=== Council elections ===
Party or alliance		Votes	%	Seats
Team Performance	Partido Demokratiko Pilipino-Lakas ng Bayan	475,831	57.97	8
Team Performance	Aksyon Demokratiko	72,454	8.83	1
Team Performance	Nacionalista Party	36,799	4.48	1
Team Performance	Independent	30,958	3.77	0
Team Performance	Total	616,042	75.05	10
Partido Federal ng Pilipinas		41,356	5.04	0
Independent		163,420	19.91	2
Ex officio seats				2
Total		820,818	100.00	14

==== 1st District ====
Mandaluyong City Council election - 1st District
Party	Candidate	Votes	%
PDP–Laban	Anthony Suva	76,855	41.67
PDP–Laban	Elton Yap (Incumbent)	72,706	39.42
Aksyon	Danny de Guzman (Incumbent)	72,454	39.29
PDP–Laban	Rodolfo Posadas (Incumbent)	61,467	33.33
Independent	Mariz Manalo	60,073	32.57
PDP–Laban	Junis Alim (Incumbent)	54,034	29.30
PDP–Laban	Miguel Carlos Aquino	45,792	24.83
PFP	MJ Angga	45,338	40.75
PFP	Fermin Romualdez	14,078	7.63
Independent	Romeo Cabus	8,470	4.79
Total votes		493,207	100.00

Party or alliance		Votes	%	Seats
Team Performance	Partido Demokratiko Pilipino-Lakas ng Bayan	310,854	63.03	4
Team Performance	Aksyon Demokratiko	72,454	14.69	1
Team Performance	Total	383,308	77.72	5
Partido Federal ng Pilipinas		41,356	8.39	0
Independent		68,543	13.90	1
Total		493,207	100.00	6

==== 2nd District ====
Mandaluyong City Council election - 2nd District
Party	Candidate	Votes	%
PDP–Laban	Benjamin Abalos III (Incumbent)	45,984	24.93
PDP–Laban	Alex Sta. Maria	44,362	24.05
Independent	Regie Antiojo	38,178	20.70
PDP–Laban	Leslie Cruz	37,476	20.32
PDP–Laban	Mike Ocampo	37,155	20.15
Nacionalista	Botong Gonzales Cuejilo (Incumbent)	36,799	19.95
Independent	Marco Merza	30,958	16.79
Independent	Josh Bacar	30,045	16.29
Independent	Rogie Gonzales	15,852	8.60
Independent	Eduardo Geronimo Jr.	10,802	5.86
Total votes		327,611	100.00

Party or alliance		Votes	%	Seats
Team Performance	Partido Demokratiko Pilipino-Lakas ng Bayan	164,977	50.36	4
Team Performance	Nacionalista Party	36,799	11.23	1
Team Performance	Independent	30,958	9.45	0
Team Performance	Total	232,734	71.04	5
Independent		94,877	28.96	1
Total		327,611	100.00	6
