= Boni Avenue =

Major road in Mandaluyong, Philippines

Coordinates: 14°34′36″N 121°2′5″E

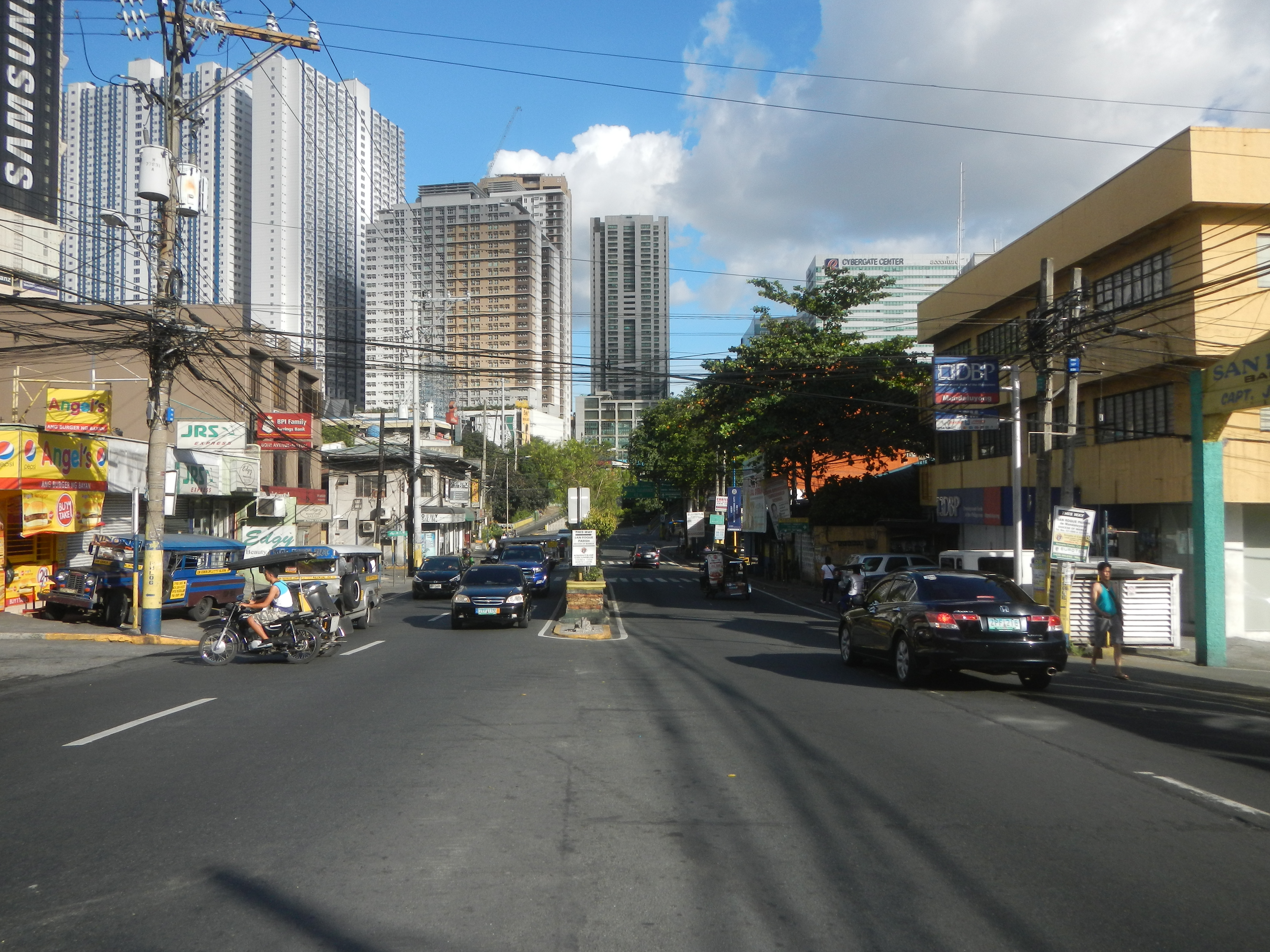
- Boni Avenue eastbound

Route information
- Maintained by the Department of Public Works and Highways – Metro Manila 1st District Engineering Office
- Length: 3.1 km (1.9 mi)

Major junctions
- West end: Rev. Aglipay Street in Población
- East end: AH26 (Epifanio de los Santos Avenue) in Barangka Ilaya and Malamig

Location
- Country: Philippines
- Major cities: Mandaluyong

Highway system
- Roads in the Philippines; Highways; Expressways; List

Boni Avenue is a major east–west thoroughfare in Mandaluyong, eastern Metro Manila, Philippines. It is a six-lane divided avenue from Aglipay Street to Epifanio de los Santos Avenue (EDSA). After crossing EDSA via the EDSA-Boni tunnel, the road continues as Pioneer Street towards Pasig. The avenue is named after the nickname of Bonifacio Javier, a decorated guerrilla leader during World War II and former mayor of Mandaluyong.

== Route description ==
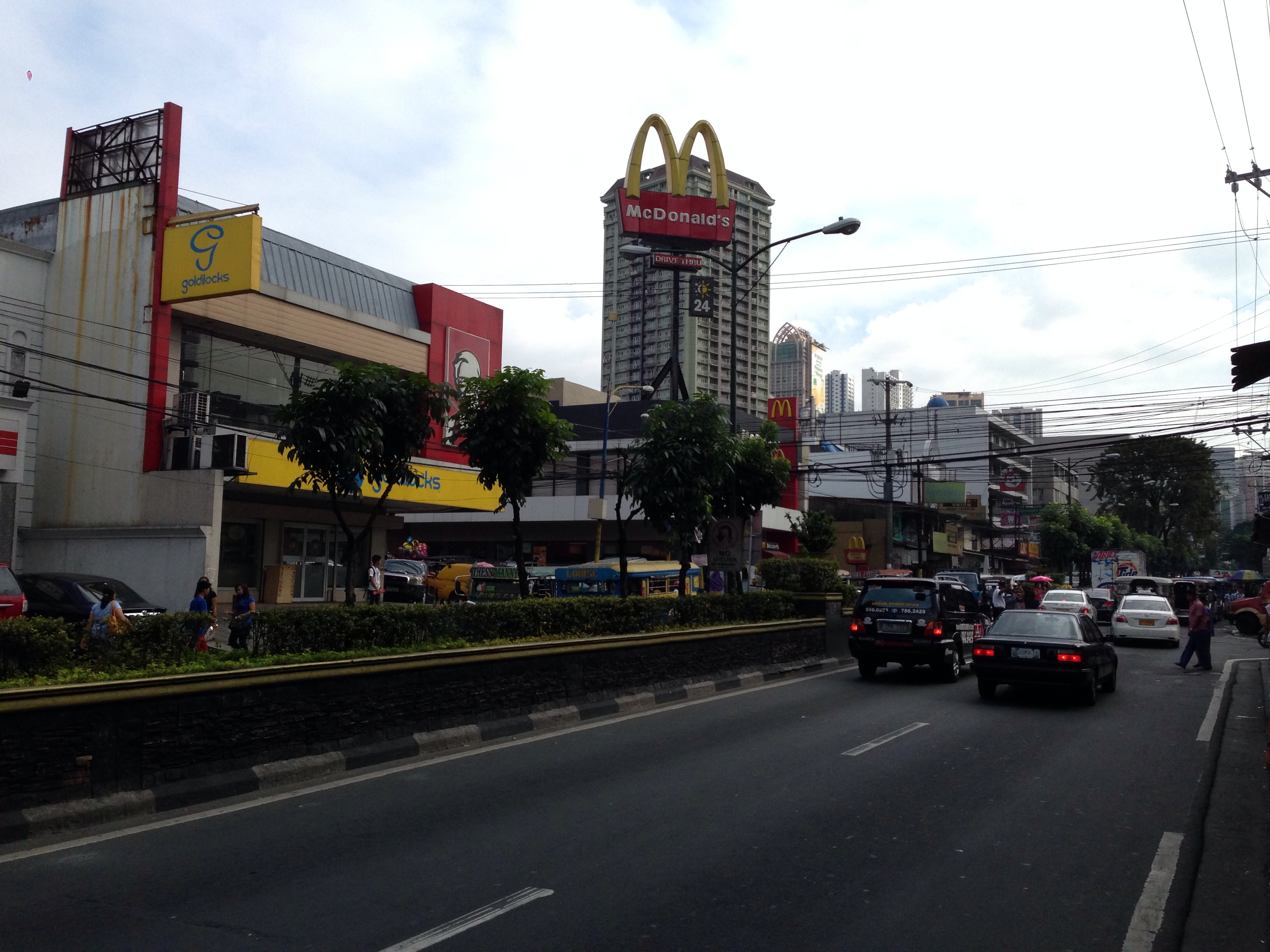
Boni Avenue at Barangka Drive

The avenue commences at the junction with Rev. Aglipay Street in the city's old downtown area (poblacíon), where the Cathedral of the Holy Child (Aglipay Church) and San Felipe Neri Church (Roman Catholic Church) are located. It heads southeasterly, traversing the barangays of Old and New Zañiga and San José, crossing Primo Cruz Street before coming to a large roundabout called Maysilo Circle in Plainview. At this roundabout, which houses the Mandaluyong City Hall complex and the Archdiocesan Shrine of the Divine Mercy, Boni intersects with F. Martinez Avenue and San Francisco Street. It curves northeast past Maysilo Circle as it approaches a commercial district at Barangka Drive. East of Barangka, the avenue becomes more commercial, with several retail outlets and condominium developments lining this section of Boni, where the Rizal Technological University is also situated. The avenue ends at the junction with EDSA, near Boni station of the Manila MRT-3.

== Intersections ==
The entire route is located in Mandaluyong.

| km | mi | Destinations | Notes |
|---|---|---|---|
| | | Aglipay Street | Western terminus. |
| | | F. Ortigas Street | |
| | | Ballesteros Street | |
| | | Primo Cruz Street | Traffic light intersection. |
| | | Neptali Gonzales Street | |
| | | San Rafael Street | |
| | | San Joaquin Street | |
| | | Santo Rosario Street | |
| | | Maysilo Circle | |
| | | Santo Rosario Street | |
| | | Sikap Street | |
| | | Ligaya Street | |
| | | Aliw Street | |
| | | Barangka Drive | Traffic light intersection. |
| | | Halcon Street | No access to opposite directions. |
| | | Basilan Street | One-way entrance |
| | | Sacrepante Street | |
| | | M. Vicente Street | |
| | | Pulog Street / San Roque Street | San Roque Street in one-way northbound. No left turn from westbound. |
| | | Mayon Street / Lion's Road | |
| | | Pinatubo Street | Access to Pinatubo Street towards EDSA via u-turn slot. |
| | | West end of EDSA–Boni Tunnel | |
| | | AH26 (EDSA) – Makati | Eastern terminus. |
1.000 mi = 1.609 km; 1.000 km = 0.621 mi: Incomplete access

== Landmarks ==
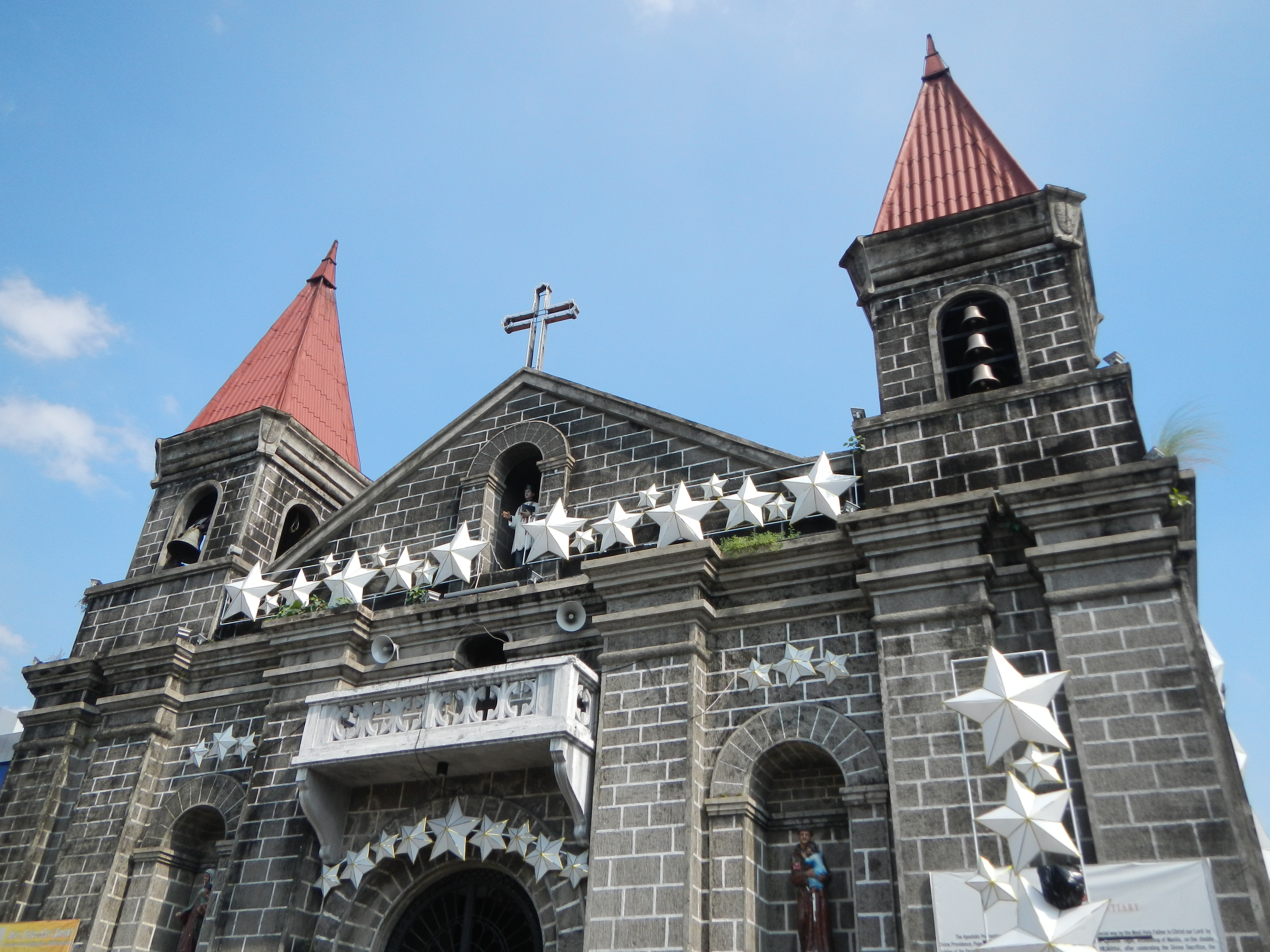
San Felipe Neri Church

- Archdiocesan Shrine of the Divine Mercy
- Dansalan Gardens
- Mandaluyong City Hall
- Mandaluyong City Medical Center
- Maysilo Circle
- Rizal Technological University
- San Felipe Neri Catholic Cemetery
- San Felipe Neri Church
- San Felipe Neri Parochial School
- San Francisco Gardens
