= Bonifacio Javier =

Filipino politician (died 1962)

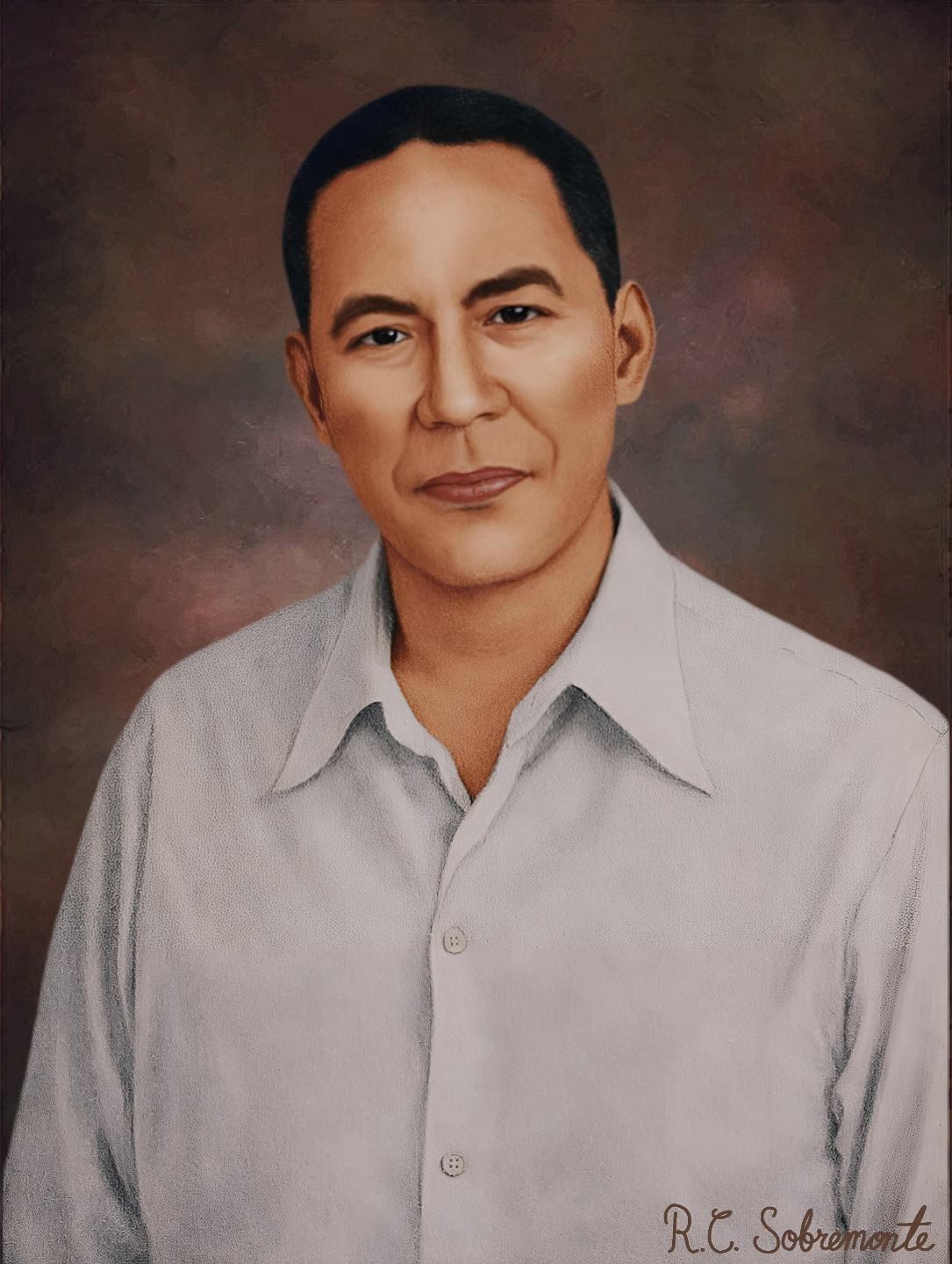

Mayor of Mandaluyong
- In office 1960–1962
- Vice Mayor: Amado T. Reyes
- Preceded by: Pedro Cruz
- Succeeded by: Amado T. Reyes
- In office 1946–1955
- Preceded by: Pedro Cruz
- Succeeded by: Pedro Cruz

Personal details
- Born: Bonifacio J. Javier; June 5, 1894
- Died: January 19, 1962 (aged 67)
- Resting place: San Felipe Neri Cemetery, Mandaluyong
- Occupation: Politician
- Nickname: Boni

Bonifacio "Boni" Javier (June 5, 1894 – January 19, 1962) was a Filipino politician and World War II guerilla leader who served as Mayor of Mandaluyong from 1946 to 1955 and from 1960 to 1962. An avenue in Mandaluyong and, in turn, the adjacent train station are named after his nickname.

His oldest son, Filemon served as mayor from 1964 to 1971.
