= Benhur Abalos =

Filipino lawyer and politician (born 1962)

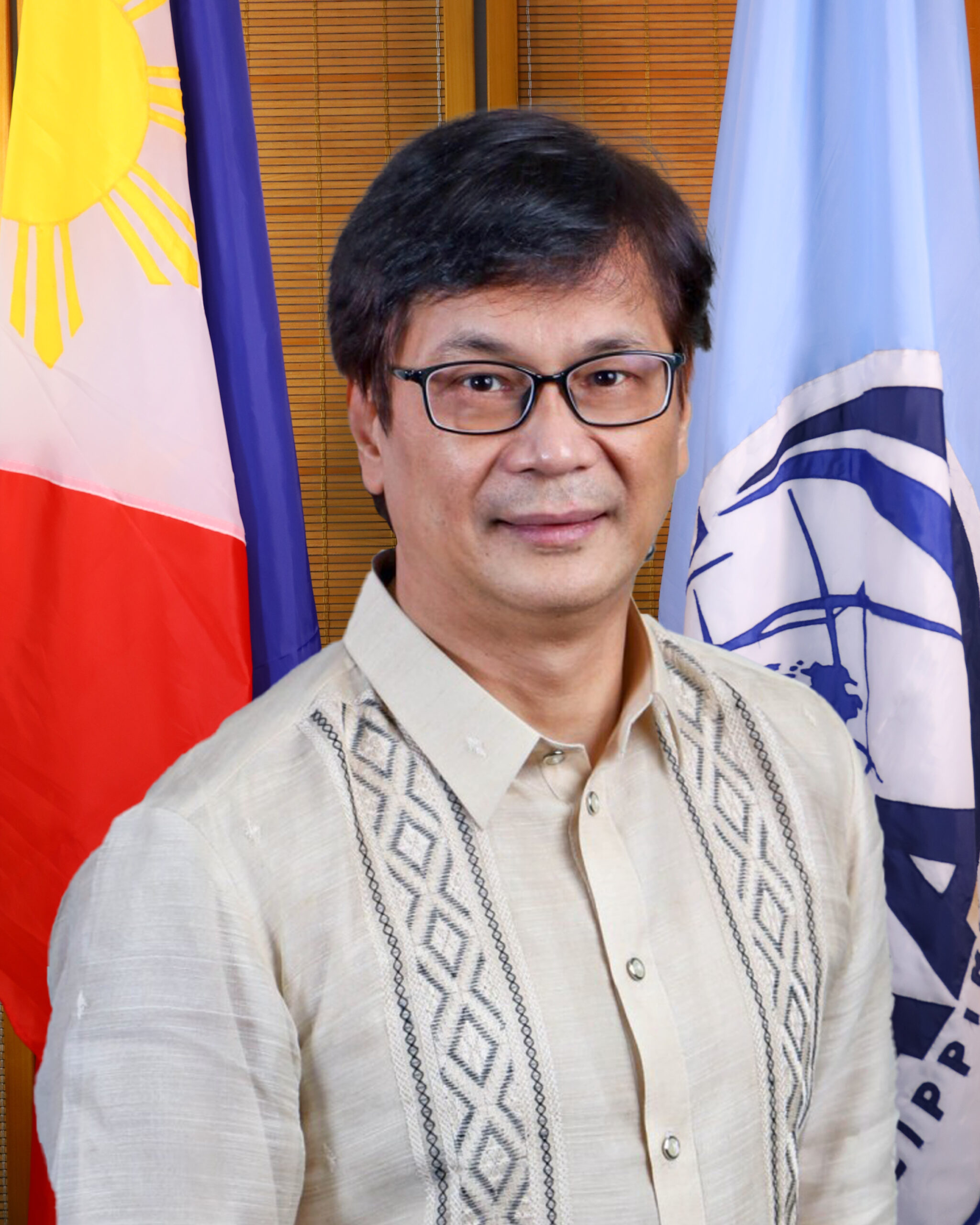
- Official portrait, 2022

Cabinet Secretary of the Philippines
- Incumbent
- Assumed office July 8, 2026
- President: Bongbong Marcos
- Preceded by: Melvin Matibag (acting)

41st Secretary of the Interior and Local Government
- In office June 30, 2022 – October 7, 2024
- President: Bongbong Marcos
- Preceded by: Eduardo Año
- Succeeded by: Jonvic Remulla

Chairman of the Metropolitan Manila Development Authority
- In office January 11, 2021 – February 7, 2022
- President: Rodrigo Duterte
- Preceded by: Danilo Lim
- Succeeded by: Romando Artes

Mayor of Mandaluyong
- In office June 30, 2007 – June 30, 2016
- Vice Mayor: Rene Sta. Maria (2007–2010); Danilo de Guzman (2010–2013); Edward Bartolome (2013–2016)
- Preceded by: Neptali Gonzales II
- Succeeded by: Carmelita Abalos
- In office June 30, 1998 – June 30, 2004
- Vice Mayor: Jesse Cruz
- Preceded by: Benjamin Abalos
- Succeeded by: Neptali Gonzales II

Member of the House of Representatives from Mandaluyong
- In office June 30, 2004 – June 30, 2007
- Preceded by: Neptali Gonzales II
- Succeeded by: Neptali Gonzales II

Member of the Mandaluyong City Council from the 1st district
- In office June 30, 1995 – June 30, 1998

Personal details
- Born: Benjamin de Castro Abalos Jr. July 19, 1962 (age 64) Manila, Philippines
- Party: PFP (2023–present)
- Other political affiliations: Lakas (1995–2017); PDP–Laban (2017–2023)
- Spouse: Carmelita "Menchie" Aguilar (m. 1985)
- Children: 6
- Parents: Benjamin Abalos Sr. (father); Corazon de Castro (mother)
- Education: De La Salle University (BA); Ateneo de Manila University (LL.B)
- Occupation: Politician, broadcaster
- Profession: Lawyer
- Nickname: Benhur
- Horse racing career
- Occupations: Horse breeder and owner
- Sport: Horse racing

Significant horses
- Ibarra; Hagdang Bato; Batang Manda

Benjamin "Benhur" de Castro Abalos Jr. (born July 19, 1962) is a Filipino politician, lawyer and racehorse breeder who is the incumbent Cabinet Secretary of the Philippines since 2026. He served as Secretary of the Interior and Local Government from 2022 to 2024 in the Cabinet of President Bongbong Marcos. He served as chairman of the Metropolitan Manila Development Authority (MMDA) in the Duterte administration from 2021 to 2022. In his hometown of Mandaluyong, he previously served as mayor (1998–2004 and 2007–2016), representative (2004–2007), and councilor (1995–1998). His father and namesake, Benjamin Abalos, is a former Commission on Elections (COMELEC) chairman, and like Benhur, also served as mayor of Mandaluyong and MMDA chairman.

== Early life and education ==
Abalos is the second eldest of the five children of Benjamin Abalos and Corazon de Castro. He was nicknamed by his grandmother after the fictional character Judah Ben-Hur. He attended his elementary and secondary education at Don Bosco Technical College, where he completed the latter in 1979. He obtained his Bachelor of Arts degree in history and political science at De La Salle University in 1982. He then attended Ateneo de Manila University, where he completed Bachelor of Laws degree in 1987. As a law student at Ateneo, he was a representative to the Student Council during his first and fourth years. He was admitted to the bar in 1988.

== Political career ==
=== People's Law Enforcement Board; City Councilor of Mandaluyong (1995–1998) ===
In the early 1990s, Abalos served as a member of the Mandaluyong People's Law Enforcement Board (PLEB) as chaired by councilor Pablito Gahol, which served as a disciplinary authority over local police. Abalos was first elected councilor from the 1st district of Mandaluyong from 1995 to 1998. In that role, he chaired the Committee on Laws, Peace & Order and Public Safety and served on the Committee on Angara Affairs and Livelihood and Cooperatives.

=== Mayor of Mandaluyong (1998–2004) ===
Abalos was first elected mayor in 1998, succeeding his father Benjamin Abalos. His brand of governance was credited with transforming Mandaluyong into the "Tiger City of the Philippines" in just one term of office. He was re-elected in 2001, and served as the local chief executive until 2004.

=== Congressman, Lone District of Mandaluyong (2004–2007) ===
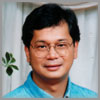
Portrait during his term as Mandaluyong representative in the 13th Congress

In the 2004 elections, he switched positions with a longtime political ally, Rep. Neptali Gonzales II, to become the city's lone representative to the House of Representatives of the Philippine Congress. Abalos served in this capacity until 2007. As a member of the lower house, he authored a total of 25 House bills and co-authored 54 others. He sponsored the biggest budget of the Philippine Sports Commission in its entire history. In addition, Abalos was the principal author of Republic Act No. 9397, otherwise known as the Amended Urban Development Housing Act of 1992.

=== Mayor of Mandaluyong (2007–2016) ===
In 2007, Abalos was elected again as mayor of Mandaluyong, switching once again with Neptali Gonzales II. He was re-elected in 2010 and in 2013.

In his second term as mayor, Abalos set new records after being elected as president of two national organizations. The first organization was the Union of Local Authorities of the Philippines (ULAP), an organization of all 1.2 million elected/appointed local officials in the country and their umbrella organizations (League of Governors, League of Vice Governors, board members, City Mayors, Municipal Mayors, Vice Mayors, Councillors, and Sangguinaang Kabataan, as well as nurses' and midwives' organizations). The second organization was the League of Cities of the Philippines (LCP), an organization of all 122 city mayors of the country. He was the first mayor to hold the presidency of these two prestigious organizations concurrently. His term in ULAP was also the first time a mayor had headed ULAP, which had traditionally been headed by a governor. He served as the local chief executive until 2016.

=== Chairman of the Metropolitan Manila Development Authority (2021–2022) ===
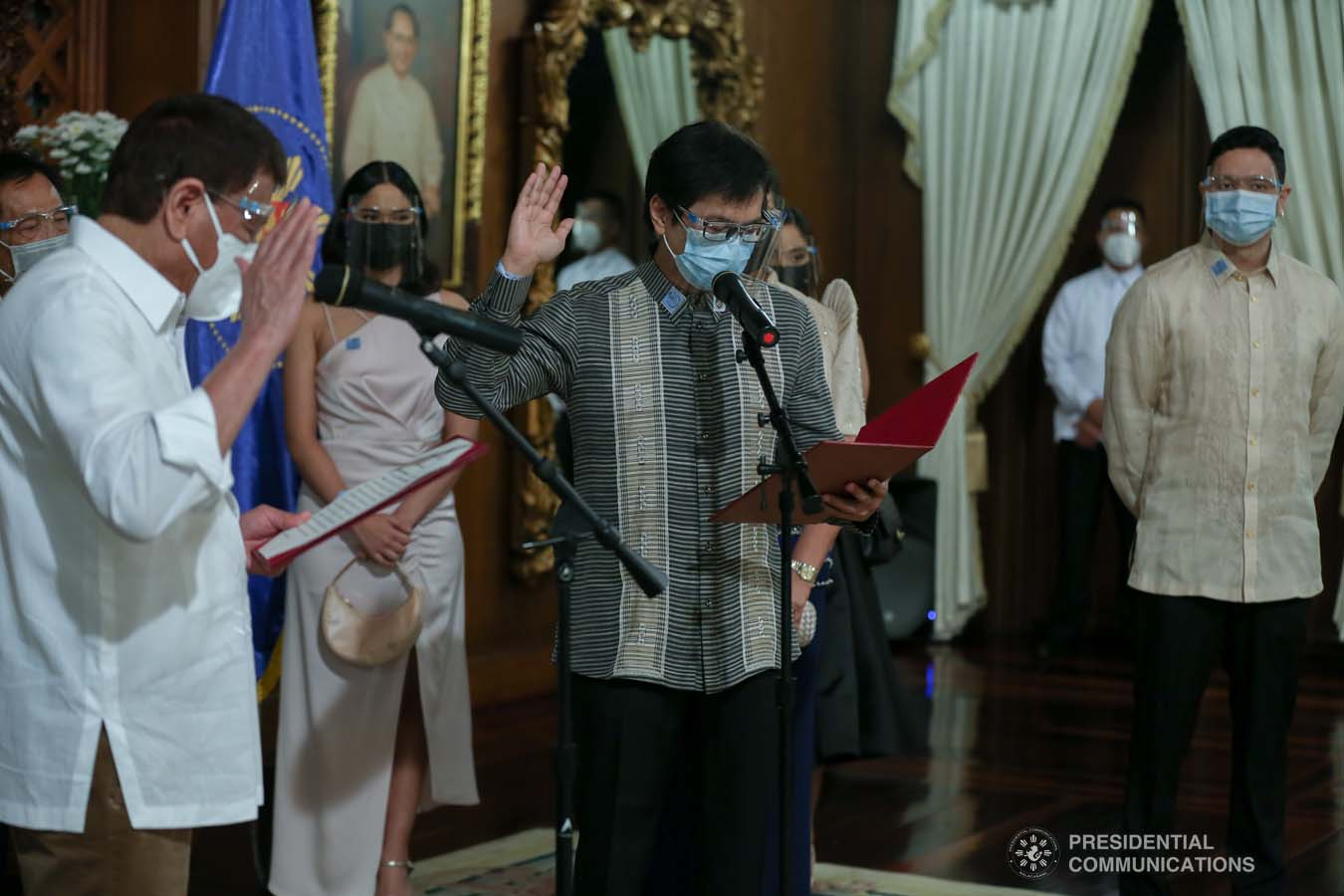
Abalos (center) sworn in by President Rodrigo Duterte as the Metropolitan Manila Development Authority chairman, January 11, 2021

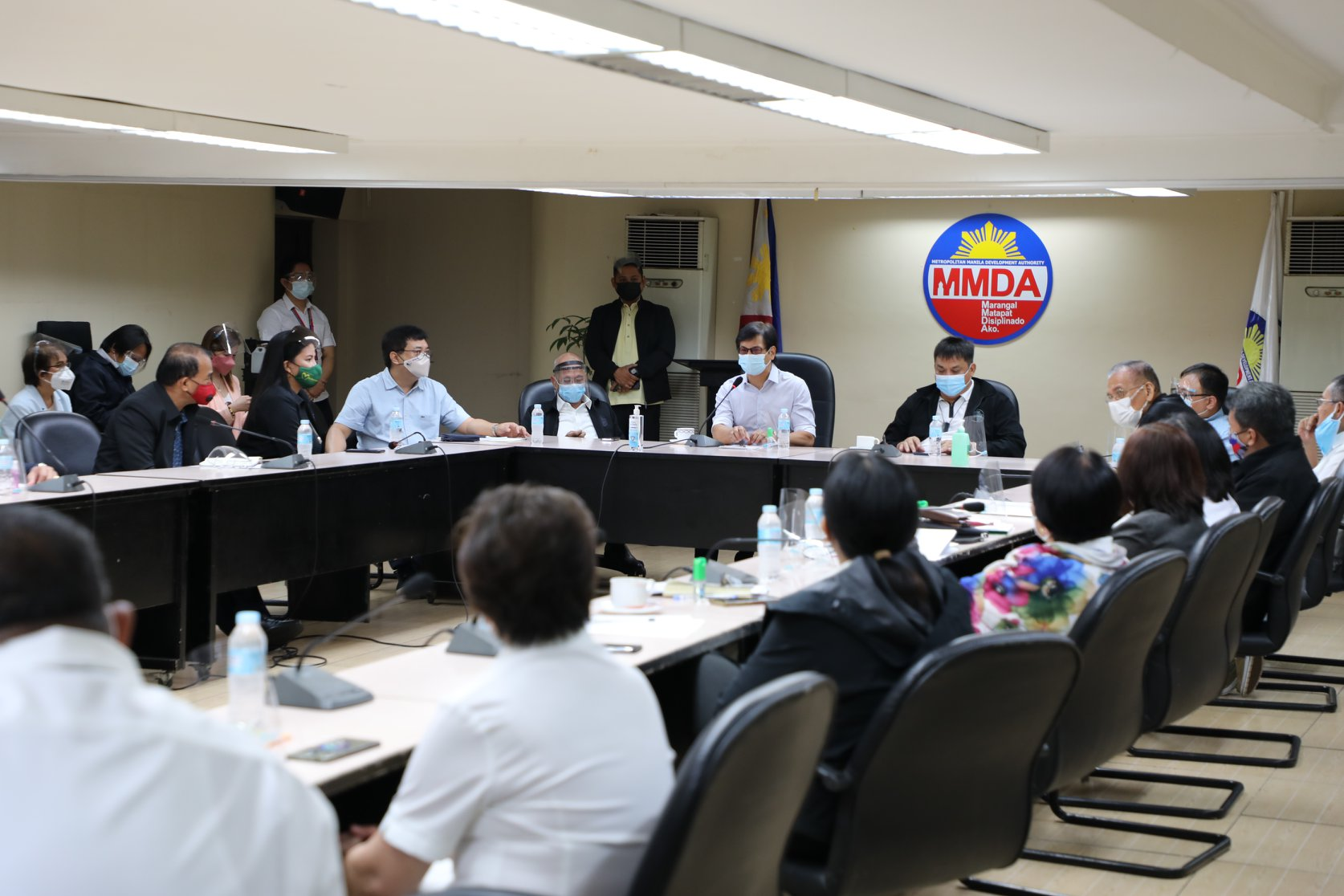
Abalos during a meeting at MMDA

Abalos was appointed by President Rodrigo Duterte as the chairman of the Metropolitan Manila Development Authority (MMDA) on January 11, 2021, replacing Danilo Lim, who died due to complications from COVID-19. Serving during the COVID-19 pandemic, he vowed to abide by the principle of good governance which he championed in Mandaluyong for more than a decade as its local chief executive. As head of the MMDA, Abalos led the agency in responding to the needs of Metro Manila pursuant to the mandates of the MMDA under Republic Act No. 7924. With this task at hand, Abalos enjoined all of the agency employees to continue working well in delivering efficient public service. Aside from being the MMDA Chairman, he is also the Chairman of the Regional Development Council for the National Capital Region and the presiding officer of the Metro Manila Council (the governing board and policy-making body of the MMDA).

Abalos resigned from the post on February 7, 2022, to serve as the national campaign manager of presidential aspirant Bongbong Marcos, one day before the start of the official campaign period for national candidates.

=== Secretary of the Department of Interior and Local Government (2022–2024) ===
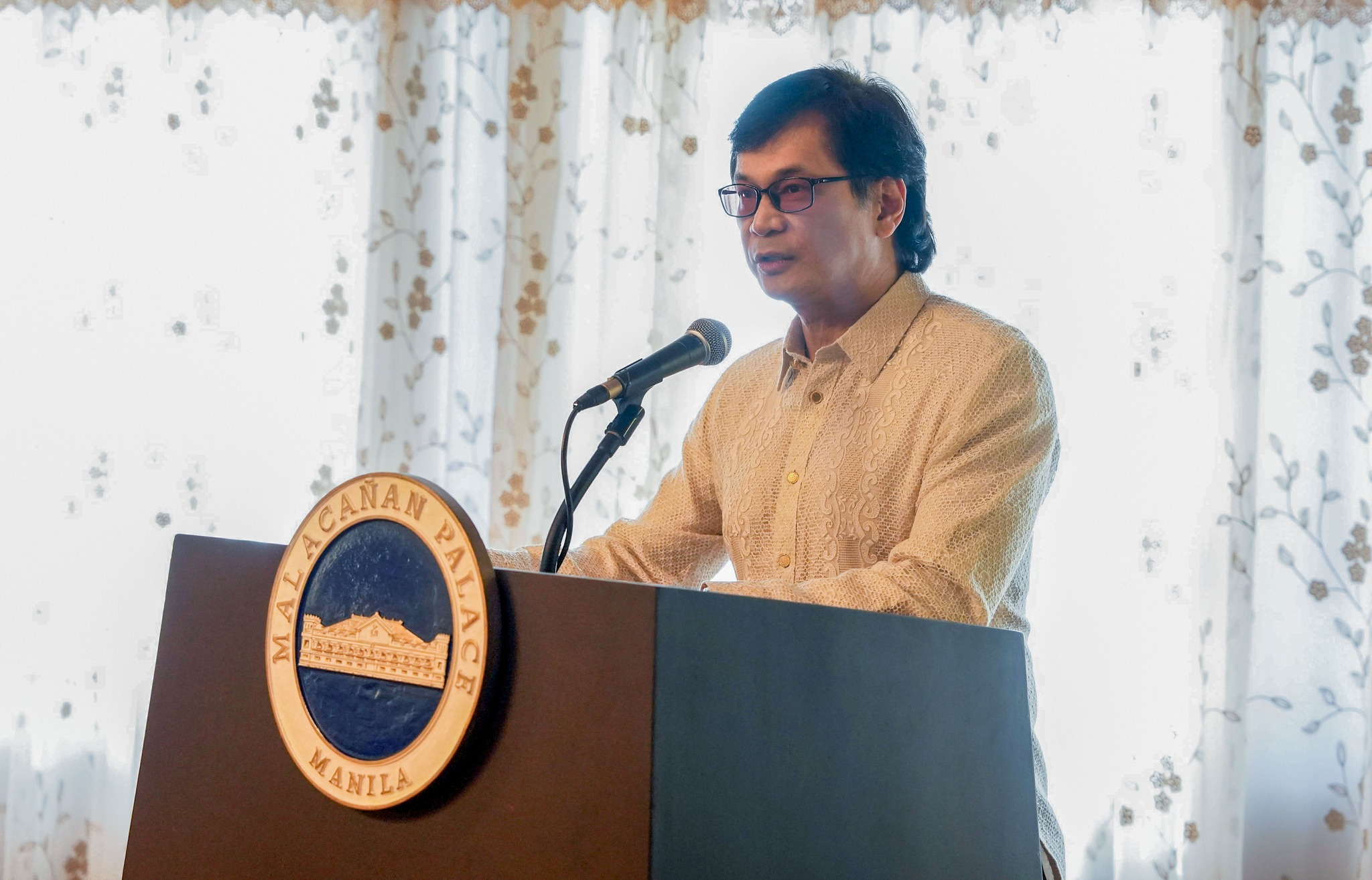
Abalos speaking during the launch of Electronic Local Government Unit (eLGU) and eReport Systems at the Malacañang Palace in July 2023

On May 13, 2022, Victor Rodriguez, the spokesperson of presumptive president Bongbong Marcos, announced that Abalos had accepted Marcos's nomination to become the Secretary of the Interior and Local Government. The announcement came a few days after the 2022 presidential elections while Marcos had a commanding lead in the partial and unofficial tallies.

Abalos said he would bring his extensive political experience when he leads the Department of the Interior and Local Government (DILG) under the administration of Marcos. At this time when there is a strong call for our nation's unity, Abalos said the "DILG will play a paramount role in promoting peace and order and in bringing together our local government units." Notable achievements during his time as DILG Secretary include the recruitment of former Moro rebels into the Philippine National Police and the implementation of the Buhay Ingatan, Droga’y Ayawan (BIDA) program, which significantly increased drug confiscations by seven times compared to the previous administrations.

While a secretary of DILG, Abalos began co-hosting the radio program DILG sa DZRH Breaktime on DZRH and DZRH News Television.

=== 2025 Senate candidacy ===
On September 26, 2024, it was officially announced that Abalos was named to the Alyansa para sa Bagong Pilipinas senatorial slate, confirming his candidacy for the 2025 Senate election. Abalos was officially deemed resigned as DILG Secretary after he filed his candidacy on October 7, with Cavite Governor Jonvic Remulla succeeding him as the DILG Secretary on October 8. Abalos would go on to lose the election, landing at 16th place with 11,580,520 votes.

=== Cabinet Secretary (2026–present) ===
On July 8, 2026, Abalos was appointed by President Bongbong Marcos as Cabinet Secretary of the Philippines, reviving the position four years after it was abolished.

== Horse racing ==
Abalos is a pioneer of horse racing in the Philippines since 2004. He said he mounted his first horse in Baguio. His first race horse was Dandansoy.

In 2005, he became the leader of Metropolitan Association of Race Horse Owners (MARHO) and the 7th top breeder. In the 2007 Triple Crown, his Ibarra, won its two legs.

As of 2012, Abalos won five legs of the Philippine Triple Crown races from his "Fire Down Under", which is just one of 12 Tiger Horse Farm-ranch broodmares in Lipa, Batangas. Hagdang Bato, became the first horse since 1990 to win the highly coveted Crown.

In 2015, Abalos' was named Breeder-Owner of the year, after his horses, including Malaya and Hagdang Bato won 6 trophies and earned almost ₱30 million in prizes. Bienvenido Niles Jr., President of Philippine Thoroughbred Breeders Association (Philtobo) bestowed the awards.

In 2017, Abalos' Kanlaon and Lakan, won Marho Breeders Championship while his Malaya won the MARHO Invitational Race.

In 2019, Abalos and Atty. Narciso O. Morales opened the Metro Manila Turf Club, Inc. (MMTCI).

In 2020, his Heneral Kalentong's win earned a Triple Crown victory, with ₱6 million in prizes.

Abalos Jr. is listed in the top 10 of the 2021 breeders' honor roll, with 46 wins. His top horses include Pinagtipunan, 2016, The Glide, 2017, Parisian Life, 2023, Open Billing-Prime Billing, 2023 and Batang Manda, 2024.

On December 8, 2024, Abalos created horse racing history when his longshot 3-year old bay colt "Batang Manda" (Ultimate Goal-Posseleft, ridden by veteran jockey Patricio Ramos Dilema, under horse trainer Claudio C. Angeles) won, and claimed the ₱7.2 million (of ₱12 million purse, the biggest prize in Philippine horse racing history at the time) in the 2024 Philracom-PCSO 52nd "Presidential Gold Cup Race" 5, 2,000 meters (6,600 ft), half-length in 2:06.8.

== Controversies ==
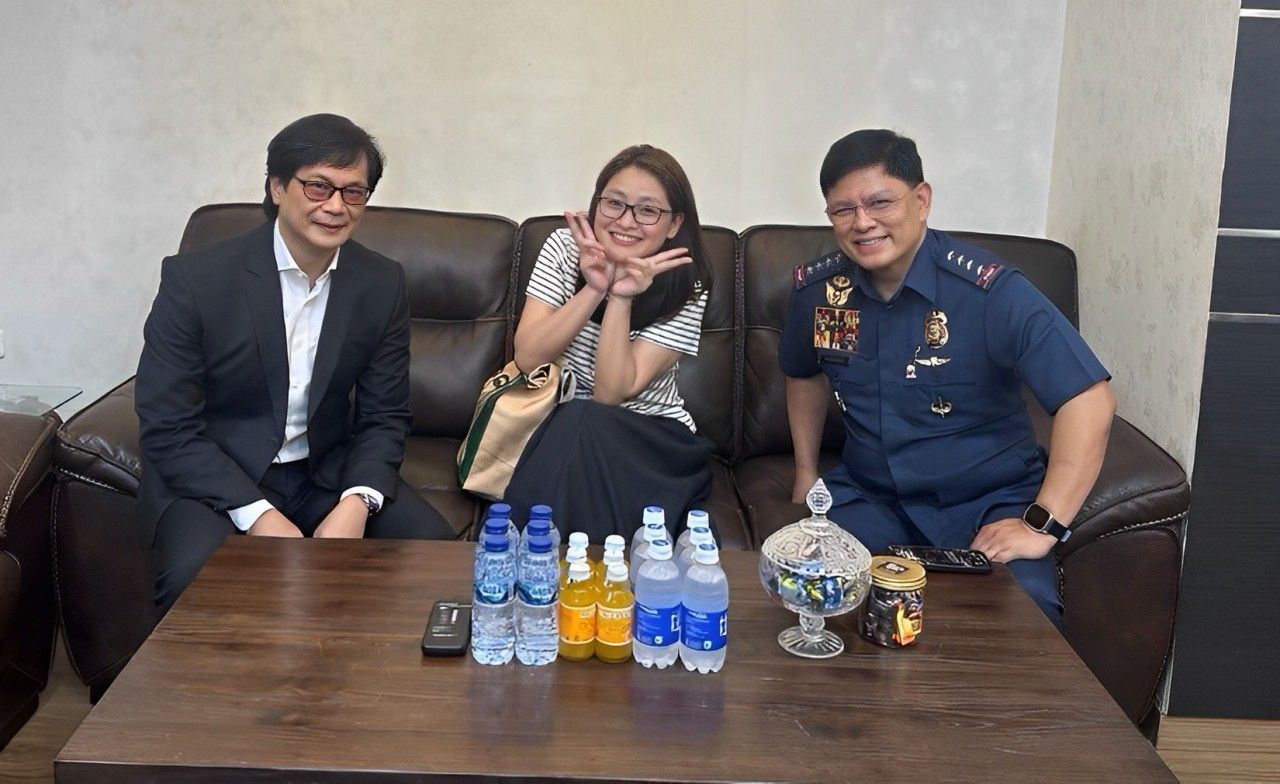
Secretary Abalos and PNP chief Rommel Marbil (right) accompanying Alice Guo (center) during her deportation proceedings in Indonesia. This photo was negatively received due to Guo and the officials' cheerful demeanor in spite of Guo's then-fugitive status.

In 2001, Abalos was sued by the Office of the Ombudsman for graft due to alleged ₱1.8-billion irregularities in Mandaluyong city projects during his mayoralty term. However, Ombudsman Aniano A. Desierto dismissed the case on May 13, 2001, due to lack of evidence, adding that Abalos performed due diligence by establishing a special committee in May 2000 to investigate the alleged missing funds, titles, and assets of the city.

In September 2024, Abalos was criticized for his perceived warmness toward fugitive Alice Guo when he traveled to Indonesia to process her deportation, with a photo of him and PNP chief Rommel Marbil documenting a private meeting with Guo receiving particular attention by critics for its bad optics.

In October 2024, former President Rodrigo Duterte filed a malicious mischief case against Abalos and Philippine National Police officers on the 15-day arrest of Apollo Quiboloy operation in the Kingdom of Jesus Christ Compound in Davao City. In November, Abalos submitted his counter-affidavit with the Department of Justice denying the allegations.

== Personal life ==
=== Family ===
Abalos is married to Carmelita "Menchie" Aguilar (the incumbent mayor of Mandaluyong) since 1985. He met her when she joined Binibining Pilipinas representing Cavite.

They have six children: identical twins Charisse Marie and Ciara Marie, Benjamin III (Benjie), Charlene Marie, Maria Corazon (Corrine), and Celine Marie. Ciara Marie died in 2005 at age 19 due to an Escherichia coli bacterial infection.

Two of his children also entered politics: Charisse has served as a Mandaluyong 1st district councilor since 2025 and previously from 2013 to 2022, while Benjamin III has served as a 2nd district councilor since 2019. Maria Corazon is one of the delegates for Miss Universe Philippines 2021.

Abalos is the uncle of 4Ps Partylist Representative Jonathan Clement Abalos.

=== Health ===
Abalos was diagnosed with dyslexia during his younger days. In an interview with Kara David on GMA's Powerhouse, he also admitted that he was a slow learner.

Abalos was diagnosed with stage 1 colon cancer in the 2010s, which he attributed to the stress caused by the imprisonment of his father Benjamin Abalos from 2011 to 2012 due to allegations of manipulating the 2007 Philippine Senate election in Cotabato. He underwent early cancer treatment and detection. He was declared cancer-free when his father was acquitted of the charges in mid-2010s. Brought about such experience, he later advocated early cancer detection and improved healthcare during his time as DILG Secretary.

On July 25, 2020, Abalos tested positive for COVID-19, after his parents contracted the disease. He later claimed that it had affected him minimally. In an interview on 24 Oras, he admitted to have self-medicated using Lianhua Qingwen, which he received from Bongbong Marcos, who had also contracted the disease, that led to his first recovery. On October 10, 2022, Abalos tested positive for the disease once again, this time as an asymptomatic carrier.

== Filmography ==
Abalos made a cameo appearance in an episode of the GMA drama series Black Rider that aired on May 30, 2024, showing him in his duties as DILG secretary. In June 2024, he played alongside his family on the game show Family Feud. In November 2024, Abalos guest-starred in another GMA drama series called Lilet Matias: Attorney-at-Law, showing him in his duty as a lawyer. In January 2025, ahead of the 2025 Philippine Senate election campaign period, Abalos has hosted Benhur Abalos: Stories of Tomorrow on TV5, as well as another guest appearance in the GMA drama series Mga Batang Riles.

A television drama special Sa Gitna ng Unos, the Benhur Abalos Life Story aired on GMA Network on February 1, 2025. Sid Lucero and Kim de Leon portrayed Abalos as the titular protagonist in the drama.

House of Representatives of the Philippines
Preceded by Neptali Gonzales II	Member of the House of Representatives from Mandaluyong; 2004–2007	Succeeded by Neptali Gonzales II
Political offices
Preceded by Benjamin Abalos	Mayor of Mandaluyong; 1998–2004	Succeeded by Neptali Gonzales II
Preceded by Neptali Gonzales II	Mayor of Mandaluyong; 2007–2016	Succeeded by Carmelita Abalos
Preceded by Danilo Lim	Chairman of the Metropolitan Manila Development Authority; 2021–2022	Succeeded by Romando Artes; Officer-in-charge
Preceded by Eduardo Año	Secretary of the Interior and Local Government; 2022–2024	Succeeded by Jonvic Remulla
Recreated Title last held by Melvin Matibag; Acting	Cabinet Secretary of the Philippines; 2026–present	Incumbent
