= Carmelita Abalos =

Vice Mayor of Mandaluyong

The Honorable Carmelita Abalos
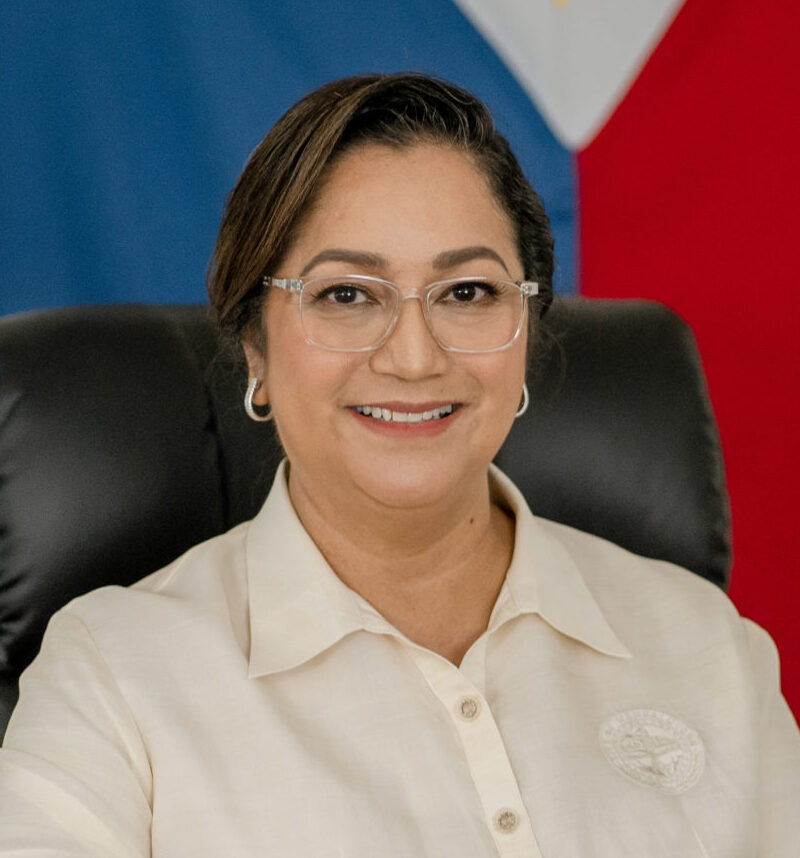
- Official portrait, 2025

Mayor of Mandaluyong
- Incumbent
- Assumed office June 30, 2025
- Vice Mayor: Anthony Suva
- Preceded by: Benjamin Abalos Sr.
- In office June 30, 2016 – June 30, 2022
- Vice Mayor: Anthony Suva
- Preceded by: Benhur Abalos
- Succeeded by: Benjamin Abalos Sr.

Vice Mayor of Mandaluyong
- In office June 30, 2022 – June 30, 2025
- Mayor: Benjamin Abalos Sr.
- Preceded by: Anthony Suva
- Succeeded by: Anthony Suva

Personal details
- Born: Carmelita Escio Aguilar; July 2, 1962 (age 64) Cavite City, Cavite, Philippines
- Party: PFP (2023–present)
- Other political affiliations: PDP–Laban (2017–2023); UNA (2015–2017)
- Spouse: Benhur Abalos (m. 1985)
- Children: 6
- Education: San Sebastian College – Recoletos Cavite
- Website: menchieabalos.ph

Carmelita 'Menchie' Aguilar-Abalos (born July 2, 1962) is a Filipina politician and the incumbent mayor of Mandaluyong since 2025. She previously served in the same position 2016 to 2022, making her the first female to hold the position, and vice mayor of the city from 2022 to 2025. She is the wife of incumbent Cabinet Secretary Benhur Abalos, whom she succeeded as mayor in 2016. She was also a semi-finalist at the Binibining Pilipinas 1981, representing Cavite.

== Early life and education ==
She was born Carmelita Escio Aguilar on July 2, 1962, in Cavite City to Nestor Aguilar and Zita Escio Aguilar. She is the third of the 10 children.

She attended her primary and secondary education at the Cavite National High School. She would later complete her bachelor's degree at the San Sebastian College – Recoletos Cavite.

== First Lady of Mandaluyong ==
During the term of her husband Benhur as mayor of Mandaluyong from 1998 to 2004 and from 2007 to 2016, Abalos served as the City Nutrition Action Officer. In 2010, she was elected as the first national president of the Nutrition Action Officers Association of the Philippines (NAOPA). She also served as the regional president of the Association of Nutrition Action Officers-National Capital Region (ANAO-NCR) from 2012 to 2016.

== Political career ==
When her husband was term-limited as mayor of Mandaluyong, Abalos ran for the mayoralty and won in 2016. She became the city's first female mayor. She was re-elected in 2019. Although she initially declared her intention to seek a third consecutive term in 2022, she instead gave way to her father-in-law, Benjamin Abalos Sr., and instead ran as his vice mayoral running mate. She ran unopposed and served as vice mayor of Mandaluyong from 2022 to 2025.

After the elder Abalos opted not to seek re-election in 2025, she ran for mayor again and was elected unopposed.

== Electoral history ==
Electoral history of Carmelita Abalos
Year	Office	Party	Votes received				Result
Year	Office	Party	Total	%	P.	Swing	Result
2016	Mayor of Mandaluyong	UNA	118,077	81.34%	1st	—N/a	Won
2019	Mayor of Mandaluyong	PDP–Laban	128,661	91.00%	1st	—N/a	Won
2025	Mayor of Mandaluyong	PFP	143,315	100%	1st	—N/a	Unopposed
2022	Vice Mayor of Mandaluyong	PDP–Laban	149,643	100%	1st	—N/a	Unopposed

== Personal life ==
Abalos is married to lawyer and politician Benhur Abalos since 1985. Together, they have six children: identical twins Charisse Marie and Ciara Marie, Benjamin III (Benjie), Charlene Marie, Maria Corazon (Corrine), and Celine Marie. Ciara Marie died in 2005 at age 19 due to an Escherichia coli bacterial infection.

Two of her children also entered politics: Charisse has served as a Mandaluyong 1st district councilor since 2025 and previously from 2013 to 2022, while Benjamin III has served as a Mandaluyong 2nd district councilor since 2019. Corrine is one of the delegates for Miss Universe Philippines 2021.

Political offices
Preceded by Benhur Abalos	Mayor of Mandaluyong; 2016–2022	Succeeded by Benjamin Abalos
Preceded by Antonio Suva	Vice Mayor of Mandaluyong; 2022–2025	Succeeded by Antonio Suva
Preceded by Benjamin Abalos	Mayor of Mandaluyong; 2025–present	Incumbent
