= Mandaluyong's at-large congressional district =

Legislative district of the Philippines

- Constituency for the House of Representatives of the Philippines
- Map of Metro Manila showing the location of Mandaluyong.
- City: Mandaluyong
- Region: Metro Manila
- Population: 425,758 (2020)
- Electorate: 223,624 (2025)
- Major settlements: Mandaluyong
- Area: 21.26 km^{2} (8.21 sq mi)

Current constituency
- Created: 1994
- Representative: Alexandria Gonzales
- Political party: NUP
- Congressional bloc: Majority

Mandaluyong's at-large congressional district is the congressional district of the Philippines in Mandaluyong. It has been represented in the House of Representatives of the Philippines since 1995. Previously included in San Juan–Mandaluyong's at-large congressional district, it includes all barangays of the city. It is currently represented in the 19th Congress by Alexandria Gonzales of the National Unity Party (NUP).

== Representation history ==
#	Image	Member	Term of office		Congress	Party	Electoral history
#	Image	Member	Start	End	Congress	Party	Electoral history
District created February 9, 1994 from San Juan–Mandaluyong district.
1		Neptali Gonzales II	June 30, 1995	June 30, 2004	10th	Lakas	Elected in 1995.
1		Neptali Gonzales II	June 30, 1995	June 30, 2004	11th	Lakas	Re-elected in 1998.
1		Neptali Gonzales II	June 30, 1995	June 30, 2004	12th	Lakas	Re-elected in 2001.
2		Benjamin Abalos Jr.	June 30, 2004	June 30, 2007	13th	Lakas	Elected in 2004.
(1)		Neptali Gonzales II	June 30, 2007	June 30, 2016	14th	Lakas	Elected in 2007.
(1)		Neptali Gonzales II	June 30, 2007	June 30, 2016	15th	Liberal	Re-elected in 2010.
(1)		Neptali Gonzales II	June 30, 2007	June 30, 2016	16th	Liberal	Re-elected in 2013.
3		Alexandria Gonzales	June 30, 2016	June 30, 2019	17th	PDP–Laban	Elected in 2016.
(1)		Neptali Gonzales II	June 30, 2019	June 30, 2025	18th	PDP–Laban	Elected in 2019.
(1)		Neptali Gonzales II	June 30, 2019	June 30, 2025	19th	NUP	Re-elected in 2022.
(3)		Alexandria Gonzales	June 30, 2025	Incumbent	20th	NUP	Elected in 2025.

== Election results ==
=== 2025 ===
Candidate	Party	Votes	%
Alexandria Gonzales	National Unity Party	141,464	100.00
Total		141,464	100.00
Valid votes		141,464	82.61
Invalid/blank votes		29,776	17.39
Total votes		171,240	100.00
Registered voters/turnout		223,624	76.57
National Unity Party hold			
Source: Commission on Elections

=== 2022 ===
2022 Philippine House of Representatives election in Mandaluyong's Lone District
Party	Candidate	Votes	%
NUP	Neptali Gonzales II	132,558	77.78
Aksyon	Boyett Bacar	36,998	21.71
Total votes		169,556	100.00
NUP hold			

=== 2019 ===
2019 Philippine House of Representatives election in Mandaluyong's Lone District
Party	Candidate	Votes	%
PDP–Laban	Neptali Gonzales II	127,268	100.00
Valid ballots		127,268	86.24
Invalid or blank votes		20,308	13.76
Total votes		147,576	100.00
PDP–Laban hold			

=== 2016 ===
2016 Philippine House of Representatives election in Mandaluyong's Lone District
Party	Candidate	Votes	%
Liberal	Alexandria Gonzales	122,792	88.95
Independent	Francisco Reyes	9,543	6.91
PDP–Laban	Jack Ramel	4,147	3.01
Independent	Albert Yap	1,560	1.13
Valid ballots		138,042	88.81
Invalid or blank votes		17,391	11.19
Total votes		155,433	100.00
Liberal hold			

=== 2013 ===
2013 Philippine House of Representatives election in Mandaluyong's Lone District
Party	Candidate	Votes	%
Liberal	Neptali Gonzales II	92,950	89.03
Ang Kapatiran	Frank Reyes	9,522	9.12
Independent	Gerard Castillo	1,511	1.45
Independent	Renato Parem	423	0.41
Total votes		104,406	100.00
Liberal hold			

=== 2010 ===
2010 Philippine House of Representatives election in Mandaluyong's Lone District
Party	Candidate	Votes	%
Liberal	Neptali Gonzales II	114,971	100.00
Valid ballots		114,971	84.26
Invalid or blank votes		21,474	15.74
Total votes		136,445	100.00
Liberal hold			

=== 2007 ===
2007 Philippine House of Representatives election in Mandaluyong's Lone District
Party	Candidate	Votes	%
Lakas	Neptali Gonzales II	88,306	95.98
Independent	Emelito Custodio	3,698	4.02
Total votes		92,004	100.00
Lakas hold			

== See also ==
- Legislative district of Mandaluyong
