= Benjamin Abalos =

Filipino politician (born 1934)

Benjamin Abalos Sr.
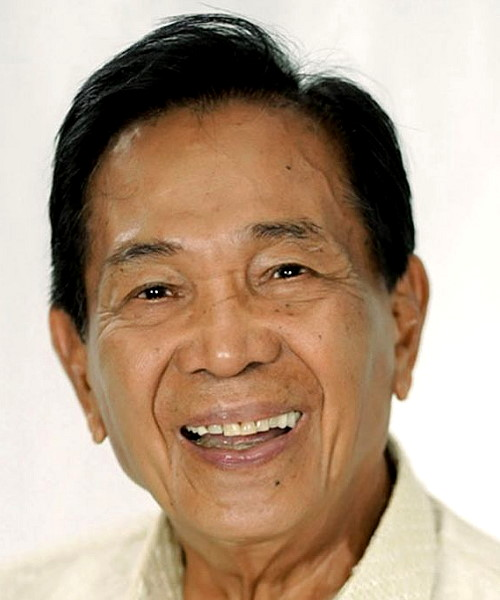
- Abalos, portrait

Mayor of Mandaluyong
- In office June 30, 2022 – June 30, 2025
- Vice Mayor: Carmelita Abalos
- Preceded by: Carmelita Abalos
- Succeeded by: Carmelita Abalos
- In office February 2, 1988 – June 30, 1998
- Vice Mayor: Ramon Guzman (1988–1995); Ernesto Domingo Jr. (1995–1998)
- Preceded by: Roman delos Reyes (OIC)
- Succeeded by: Benjamin Abalos Jr.
- In office February 25, 1986 – December 1, 1987; Officer In Charge
- Appointed by: Corazon Aquino
- Preceded by: Ernesto Domingo
- Succeeded by: Roman delos Reyes (OIC)

Chairman of the Commission on Elections
- In office June 5, 2002 – October 1, 2007
- Appointed by: Gloria Macapagal Arroyo
- Preceded by: Alfredo Benipayo
- Succeeded by: Resurreccion Borra

Chairman of the Metropolitan Manila Development Authority
- In office January 20, 2001 – June 5, 2002
- President: Gloria Macapagal Arroyo
- Preceded by: Jejomar Binay
- Succeeded by: Bayani Fernando

Personal details
- Born: Benjamin Santos Abalos; September 21, 1934 (age 92)
- Party: PFP (2023–present)
- Other political affiliations: PDP–Laban (2017–2023); Lakas (1991–2017); LDP (1988–1991)
- Spouse: Corazon de Castro (m. 1960; died 2021)
- Children: 5 (including Benhur)
- Education: Ateneo de Manila University (A.B.); Manuel L. Quezon University (LL.B)
- Occupation: Judge
- Profession: Lawyer

Benjamin Santos Abalos Sr. (born September 21, 1934) is a Filipino politician who last served as the mayor of Mandaluyong, Metro Manila from 2022 to 2025, a position he also held from 1986 to 1987 and from 1988 to 1998. He also served as a chairman of the Commission on Elections and chairman of the MMDA. As a private citizen, he also serves as the president of the Wack Wack Golf and Country Club and president of the Golfers Association of the Philippines. He is the father of former Mandaluyong mayor and Interior and Local Government Secretary Benhur Abalos. His paternal grandson is politician, Jonathan Clement Abalos.

== Early life and education ==
Abalos was born into a poor family in Pangasinan on September 21, 1934. His parents are Ciriaco Abalos and Eufrocinia Santos. He studied economics at Ateneo de Manila University and graduated from the Manuel L. Quezon University in 1957. Abalos supported himself through college by taking several jobs, working as a janitor, messenger, factory worker, and a caddy at the Wack Wack Golf and Country Club.

== Public Service career ==
=== Legal career ===
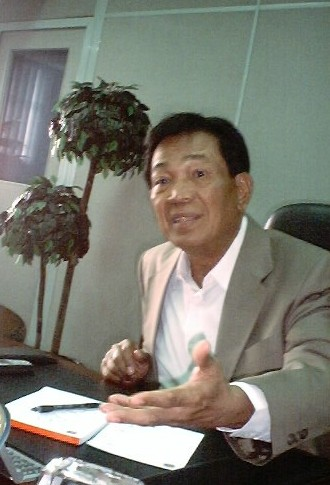
Abalos as COMELEC Chairman under Pres. Gloria Arroyo

Abalos was admitted to the roll of attorneys of the Supreme Court in 1958 and then into the Integrated Bar of the Philippines in 1973. He began his career as a fiscal before being appointed as a judge and later elected as President of the Judges Association of the Philippines. He then served as a Trial Court Judge, earning recognition as the Outstanding Judge of the Philippines for ten consecutive years.

=== Political career ===
In 1963, Abalos ran for vice mayor of Mandaluyong, which was then a municipality of Rizal, and lost to Nacionalista candidate Renato Lopez, the son of the late mayor Isaac Lopez.

He ran for Mandaluyong mayor in 1980, losing to the candidate of former President Ferdinand Marcos. In 1986, shortly after Marcos was ousted through a popular uprising, President Corazon Aquino appointed him as Officer-in-Charge (OIC) of the then municipality of Mandaluyong.

As OIC of the town, he ran for the post of mayor and won in the local elections of 1988, the first local elections under the 1987 Constitution. He was re-elected two times in the elections of 1992 and 1995, making him one of the two Aquino OIC appointees who survived and secured the constitution-mandated three consecutive terms limit for local officials. Abalos made Mandaluyong's cityhood in 1994, also witnessing economic growth brought about by the establishment of new shopping malls and Marketplace, the country's first build-operate-and-transfer and build-transfer (BOT-BT) project. He also initiated Land for the Landless and Home for the Homeless Program housing projects, Metro Manila's first Office for Disabled People, and Mandaluyong Collegiate Scholarship in 1996, as well as seeing the construction of Mandaluyong City Medical Center (the city's first tertiary hospital) and the Mandaluyong Manpower and Technical-Vocational Training Center. Abalos was a former member of the Laban ng Demokratikong Pilipino later joining the then newly formed Lakas NUCD-CMD.

=== Chairman of MMDA ===
On January 20, 2001, Abalos was appointed chairman of the Metropolitan Manila Development Authority, a post he held until the following year.

=== Chairman of COMELEC ===
On June 5, 2002, President Gloria Macapagal Arroyo appointed Abalos to replace Alfredo Benipayo after the latter failed to secure the confirmation of his appointment from the Commission on Appointments. On October 1, 2007, Abalos resigned during a press conference; and Resurreccion Borra would be appointed Acting Chairman.

=== Return as Mayor of Mandaluyong ===
Abalos ran for mayor of Mandaluyong in 2022 under PDP-Laban, with his daughter-in-law, incumbent mayor Menchie Abalos, as his running mate for vice mayor. He said that he would run to fulfill his promise to his deceased wife that he would spend his remaining years serving the people of Mandaluyong. He won the elections in a landslide victory, securing a comeback as mayor after 24 years. However, he chose not to seek reelection in 2025.

== Controversies ==
On September 27, 2007, Iloilo Vice Governor Rolex Suplico filed a 64-page impeachment complaint against Abalos, in his capacity as Commission on Elections Chairman, before the House of Representatives of the Philippines regarding the NBN–ZTE deal corruption scandal. It was endorsed by Representatives Teofisto Guingona III (Bukidnon–2nd), Teodoro Casiño (Bayan Muna), and Representative Ma. Isabelle Climaco (Zamboanga City–1st). Affidavits from Romulo Neri and Jose de Venecia III supported the complaint. He was later acquitted by the Sandiganbayan Fourth Division from graft on May 10, 2016. His acquittal was upheld by the Supreme Court through a 15-page resolution dated June 14, 2021.

On December 13, 2011, Abalos was arrested for electoral sabotage in the 2007 midterm elections for allegedly manipulating the senatorial election results in Cotabato to favor all 12 senatorial candidates under the TEAM Unity administration coalition. He was detained at the Southern Police District headquarters. On June 6, 2012, the Pasay Regional Trial Court (RTC) Branch 117 granted his petition to bail. He was ordered to settle ₱200,000 bond for each the 11 counts of electoral sabotage, totaling to ₱2.2 million. He was later acquitted from 11 counts of electoral sabotage by the Pasay RTC Branch 117 on October 8, 2014, and of the final two counts by the Pasay RTC Branch 112 on February 2, 2015, both due to lack of evidence.

== Personal life ==
Abalos married Corazon de Castro in 1960, with whom he has five children. His sons Benjamin Jr. and Jonathan and daughter Maria Corazon also entered politics. Benjamin Jr. is the incumbent Secretary of the Interior and Local Government, former mayor of Mandaluyong, and former Metropolitan Manila Development Authority chairman, and former councilor of Mandaluyong. Jonathan also served as a three-term city councilor of Mandaluyong. Maria Corazon serves as the barangay captain of Highway Hills, Mandaluyong. His wife died on January 25, 2021, due to severe sepsis, secondary to pneumonia caused by COVID-19.

Political offices
Preceded by Ernesto Domingo	Officer-in-Charge Mayor of Mandaluyong; 1986–1987	Succeeded by Roman delos Reyes (Officer In-Charge)
Preceded by Roman delos Reyes (Officer In-Charge)	Mayor of Mandaluyong; 1988–1998	Succeeded by Benjamin Abalos, Jr.
Preceded by Jejomar Binay	Chairman of the Metropolitan Manila Development Authority; 2001–2002	Succeeded by Bayani Fernando
Preceded by Alfredo Benipayo	COMELEC Chairman; 2002–2007	Succeeded by Resurreccion Borra (Acting)
Preceded by Carmelita Abalos	Mayor of Mandaluyong; 2022–2025	Succeeded by Carmelita Abalos
