= Plainview, Mandaluyong =

Barangay in Mandaluyong City, Metro Manila, Philippines

Plainview
- Barangay
- Mandaluyong City Hall Executive Building

- Location within Metro Manila
- Coordinates: 14°34′39.57″N 121°2′1.25″E
- Country: Philippines
- Region: Metro Manila
- City: Mandaluyong

Government
  - Type: Barangay
  - Barangay captain: Michael C. Garcia

Area
  - Total: 1.088 km^{2} (0.420 sq mi)

Population (2015)
  - Total: 26,557
- Time zone: UTC+8 (PST)
- Postal Code: 1550
- Website: Facebook

Plainview is an urban barangay in Mandaluyong, Metro Manila, Philippines. It is home to the city's seat of government and was originally the site of the Plainview residential subdivision.

The area is named after the area's history as a plain where rice and corn were cultivated. It was originally developed as a private residential subdivision by real estate developer Ortigas, Madrigal and Company (now Ortigas and Company). The residential development was converted into a barangay, retaining its name.

== History ==
The area that would become known as Plainview was part of the original barrio of Hulo in the 1900s that also comprised the present-day barangays of Mauway and Malamig. Plainview was named after the area's vast plains, where alongside the barangays of Namayan and Zaniga, was where rice and corn were cultivated. The area was also abundant in trees and was a popular spot for bird-hunting. Additionally, the streets of the Plainview subdivision were named after patron saints.

During the term of Mandaluyong mayor Pedro P. Cruz, the Plainview subdivision was donated by Ortigas and Company Limited to the Mandaluyong municipal government. The area was then classified as the barangay of Plainview. Its central junction, Maysilo Circle, was then developed as the Mandaluyong City Government Complex, which broke ground in 1959 to replace the original Mandaluyong municipal hall along Boni Avenue in present-day Barangay Poblacion.

=== Flooding issues ===
Plainview's central area at Maysilo Circle is often plagued with flooding problems during the rainy season due to its location as a catch-basin for the surrounding areas, as well as the exceeded capacity of the original 1980s flood control system underneath, which was only rated at 6 cubic meters (6,000 L) per second.

In January 2015, the Department of Public Works and Highways (DPWH) initiated the ₱400 million (US$7.6 million) Maysilo Circle Flood Control Project to upgrade the flood control system's capacity to 36 cubic meters (36,000 L) per second. The project became infamous for closing off San Francisco Street to traffic and for causing severe flooding even without the rains. Allegations of corruption were also raised due to the slow progress of the project, which was still not yet finished after two years of construction. The DPWH in February 2016 stated that the project was on schedule to be finished by May 2016. The street was reopened to the public on October 25, 2016, after the completion of the project.

== Maysilo Circle ==
The focal point of Plainview is Maysilo Circle, a 3-lane roundabout which serves as a junction point between the northern and southern sections of Boni Avenue, F. Martinez Avenue, San Francisco Street, and Sgt. Bumatay Street in the southern part of the city. It is also located a few kilometers from the city's border with Makati across the Pasig River.

Inside the circle are important government buildings, such as the old and new buildings of the Mandaluyong city hall complex, the main office of the Mandaluyong City Fire Department, the Mandaluyong Postal Office, the Mandaluyong Hall of Justice, the Barangay Plainview Operations Center, as well as recreational and religious places such as the Amado T. Reyes Park and the Archdiocesan Shrine of Divine Mercy.

== Education ==
- St. Therese Educational Private School
- Plainview Elementary School
- Holistic Educational Montessori Center
- Curun Christian School, Inc.
- Angel's Institute of Learning (Pre-school to Grade 6)
- Rainbow Room Learning Center (Pre-school)
- Future Mind's Academy (Pre-school to Grade 6)
- H.E. Montessori Center (Pre-school)

== Landmarks ==
- Dambana ng Ala-ala
- Archdiocesan Shrine of the Divine Mercy Church, Edsa Mandaluyong
- Mandaluyong City Hall

== Government ==
The seat of government of Plainview is located at 40 Malaya Street, near the Mandaluyong City Medical Center. The Mandaluyong City Government Complex is also within Plainview, housing the city's departments, the local office of the Commission on Elections, and the main offices of the Mandaluyong City Fire Department, Mandaluyong Postal Office, and the Mandaluyong Hall of Justice.

== See also ==
- Administrative divisions of Metro Manila
