= Alexandria Gonzales =

Filipino politician

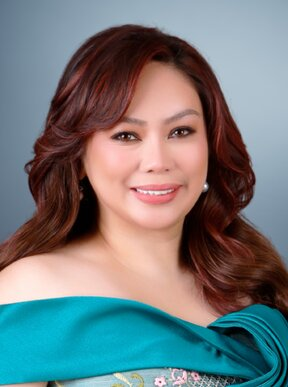
- Official portrait, 2026

Member of the Philippine House of Representatives from Mandaluyong's at-large congressional district
- Incumbent
- Assumed office June 30, 2025
- Preceded by: Neptali Gonzales II
- In office June 30, 2016 – June 30, 2019
- Preceded by: Neptali Gonzales II
- Succeeded by: Neptali Gonzales II

Personal details
- Born: Alexandria Pahati; November 13, 1977 (age 48) Quezon City, Philippines
- Party: NUP (2024–present)
- Other political affiliations: PDP (2016–2022); Liberal (2015–2016)
- Spouse: Neptali Gonzales II (m. 2002)
- Children: 2

Alexandria "Queenie" Pahati-Gonzales (born November 13, 1977) is a Filipino businesswoman, television reporter, and politician who currently serves in the House of Representatives of the Philippines for the at-large District of Mandaluyong since 2025 and previously from 2016 to 2019.

== Political career ==
Gonzales was elected as a representative of Mandaluyong's at-large congressional district at the House of Representatives in the 2016 House of Representatives elections. She succeeded her husband Neptali Gonzales II, who was term-limited. She served for only one term until 2019 and was succeeded by her husband.

Gonzales was re-elected in Mandaluyong's at-large congressional district in 2025, succeeding her husband who chose not to seek re-election.

== Personal life ==
Since 2002, Alexandria Gonzales is married to Neptali Gonzales II, with whom she has twins, Neptali III and Isabel Candida.

== See also ==
- List of female members of the House of Representatives of the Philippines
