= Neptali Gonzales II =

Filipino lawyer and politician (born 1954)

Neptali "Boyet" Gonzales II
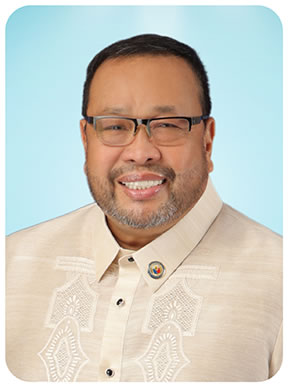
- Official portrait, 2022

Deputy Speaker of the House of Representatives of the Philippines
- In office July 22, 2019 – June 1, 2022
- House Speaker: Alan Peter Cayetano; Lord Allan Velasco

House Majority Leader
- In office July 26, 2010 – June 6, 2016
- Preceded by: Arthur Defensor Sr.
- Succeeded by: Rodolfo Fariñas
- In office July 23, 2001 – June 4, 2004
- Preceded by: Sergio Apostol
- Succeeded by: Prospero Nograles

Member of the Philippine House of Representatives from Mandaluyong
- In office June 30, 2019 – June 30, 2025
- Preceded by: Alexandria Gonzales
- Succeeded by: Alexandria Gonzales
- In office June 30, 2007 – June 30, 2016
- Preceded by: Benjamin Abalos Jr.
- Succeeded by: Alexandria Gonzales
- In office June 30, 1995 – June 30, 2004
- Preceded by: District created
- Succeeded by: Benjamin Abalos Jr.

26th Mayor of Mandaluyong
- In office June 30, 2004 – June 30, 2007
- Vice Mayor: Jesse Cruz
- Preceded by: Benjamin Abalos Jr.
- Succeeded by: Benjamin Abalos Jr.

Personal details
- Born: Neptali Medina Gonzales II; August 29, 1954 (age 72) Mandaluyong, Rizal, Philippines
- Party: NUP (2020–present)
- Other political affiliations: PDP–Laban (2018–2020); Liberal (2009–2018); Lakas–CMD (2001–2009); LDP (1995–2001)
- Spouses: Josephine Olivia Francisco (died 2001) Alexandria Pahati (m. 2002)
- Children: 3
- Parents: Neptali A. Gonzales (father); Candida Medina-Gonzales (mother)
- Education: Far Eastern University (BA); Ateneo de Manila University (LL.B)
- Occupation: Lawyer
- Nickname(s): Boyet, NGJ

Neptali "Boyet" Medina Gonzales II (born August 29, 1954) is a Filipino lawyer and politician who previously served as the Representative of Mandaluyong's Lone District for 24 non-consecutive years, from 1995 to 2004, 2007 to 2016, and 2019 to 2025. He also served as mayor of Mandaluyong from 2004 to 2007. He was one of the House Deputy Speakers during the 18th Congress and has been the House Majority Leader from 2001 to 2004 and 2010 to 2016.

Gonzales is the son of lawyer and politician Neptali Gonzales, author of the Freedom Constitution in 1986 that served as a transitional charter prior to the current 1987 Constitution.

== Early life and education ==
Gonzales was born on August 29, 1954, in Mandaluyong, Rizal to lawyer and politician Neptali Gonzales Sr., who would eventually become Senate President, and Candida Medina-Gonzales. He is their youngest child and only son. He has three older sisters, Myrna, Sorohayda, and Rhodora.

He attended the Mandaluyong Elementary School and received his secondary and college education at the Union High School of Manila of the Philippine Christian College (now the Philippine Christian University). He finished his degree in political science at the Far Eastern University (FEU) in 1975 and took up law at the Ateneo de Manila University, where he graduated in 1979.

== Career ==
Before entering public service, Gonzales was a senior partner of the law firm Gonzales, Batiller, Bilog, and Associates from 1980 to 1995. He also served briefly as a bar reviewer and professor in criminal law and constitutional law at the FEU Institute of Law.

=== Political career ===
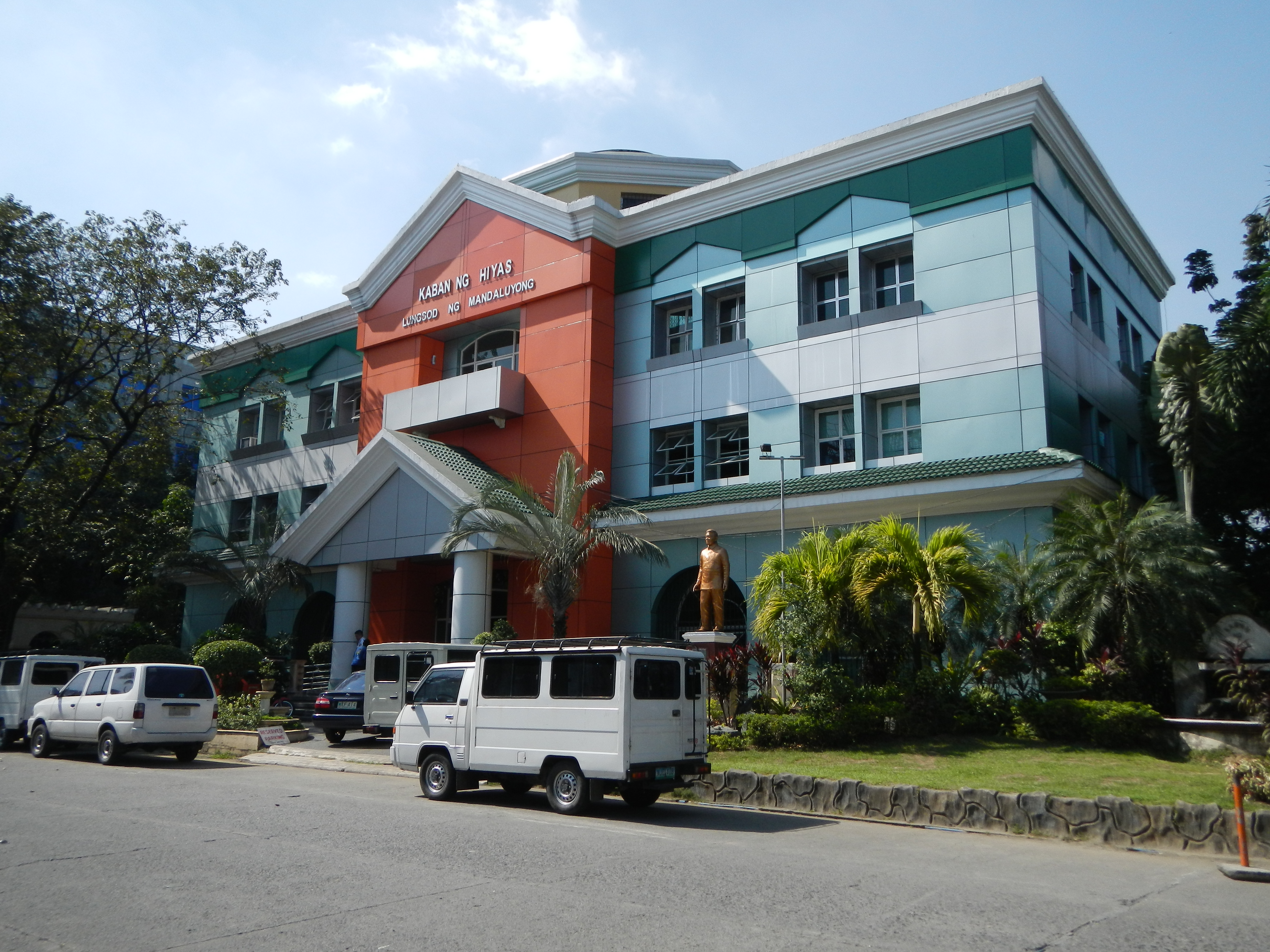
"Kaban ng Hiyas" - Office of Cong. Neptali Gonzales II, Mandaluyong City Hall Compound

Gonzales was the first congressman of Mandaluyong when it was converted into a city in 1995 and separated from what used to be the San Juan-Mandaluyong congressional district. He later served as mayor of Mandaluyong from 2004 to 2007 and returned as the city's representative from 2007 to 2016.

In the 10th Congress, he served on eight congressional committees, including the Committee on Rules. In the opening session of the 11th Congress, he was selected as one of the two vice–chairmen of the Committee on Rules, which was then chaired by Majority Leader Mar Roxas (Capiz–1st). Gonzales became Majority Leader toward the end of the 11th Congress and held the position into the 12th Congress. From 1995 to 2004, he authored 33 bills and was co-author of 92 bills. He was one of two newly elected members of Congress to have the greatest number of bills passed into law.

During his first 9-year period in Congress, Gonzales passed a bill allowing the construction of the City of Mandaluyong Science High School and leading the conversion of the Rizal Technological Colleges into Rizal Technological University. In recognition, the RTU awarded him a PhD in Public Administration (Honoris Causa) in October 2003.

During his three-year term as Mayor of Mandaluyong, Gonzales supported the implementation of improved physical and social infrastructure in Mandaluyong. He also initiated innovations in computerization, social infrastructure and urban renewal. He pushed for improvement in health care in the city by strengthening its only public hospital and empowering all health centers for preventive health care. He instigated fresh initiatives in local fiscal reforms and tax collection. He urged private bodies to support the program of housing for the poor. His administration's partnership with the Gawad Kalinga and the Pasig River Rehabilitation Commission provided adequate housing for more than a thousand families in the city.

Gonzales was Senior Deputy Majority Leader of the 14th Philippine Congress. As such, he was an ex officio member of all House Committees. He was also Senior Vice-chairman of the Committee on Rules, and headed the caucus of NCR Congressmen. In the 15th and 16th Congress, he was the Majority Floor Leader of the House.

In the 18th Congress, Gonzales was elected to be one of the Deputy Speakers of the House.

== Personal life ==
Gonzales' first wife was Josephine Olivia Francisco, who died in May 2001. They had one daughter, Kristine Olivia. In December 2002, Gonzales married Alexandria Pahati, a television reporter, with whom he had twins, Neptali III and Isabel Candida.

House of Representatives of the Philippines
New district	Member of the House of Representatives from Mandaluyong's at-large district 1995–2004	Succeeded by Benhur Abalos
Preceded by Benhur Abalos	Member of the House of Representatives from Mandaluyong's at-large district 2007–2016	Succeeded by Alexandria Gonzales
Preceded by Alexandria Gonzales	Member of the House of Representatives from Mandaluyong's at-large district 2019–2025	Succeeded by Alexandria Gonzales
Preceded by Sergio Apostol	House Majority Leader; 2001–2004	Succeeded by Prospero Nograles
Preceded by Arthur Defensor Sr.	House Majority Leader; 2010–2016	Succeeded by Rodolfo Fariñas
Political offices
Preceded by Benhur Abalos	Mayor of Mandaluyong; 2004–2007	Succeeded by Benhur Abalos
