= Legislative districts of Mandaluyong =

Legislative district of the Philippines

The legislative districts of Mandaluyong are the representations of the highly urbanized city of Mandaluyong in the Congress of the Philippines. The city is currently represented in the lower house of the Congress through its lone congressional district.

== History ==
Mandaluyong, then known as San Felipe Neri, was originally represented as part of the at-large district of the province of Manila in the Malolos Congress from 1898 to 1899. The then-town was later incorporated to the province of Rizal, established in 1901, and was represented as part of the first district of Rizal from 1907 to 1941 and from 1945 to 1972. When Mandaluyong was merged to form the City of Greater Manila during World War II, it was represented as part of the at-large district of Manila in the National Assembly of the Second Philippine Republic from 1943 to 1944. It was part of the representation of Region IV in the Interim Batasang Pambansa from 1978 to 1984, and was grouped with San Juan as the Legislative district of San Juan–Mandaluyong for representation in the Regular Batasang Pambansa from 1984 to 1986 as well as in the restored House of Representatives from 1987 to 1995. Mandaluyong and San Juan were separated and granted their own representations in Congress by virtue of section 49 of Mandaluyong's city charter (Republic Act No. 7675) which was approved on February 9, 1994 and ratified on April 10, 1994.

== Lone District ==
NUP (1)

Legislative Districts and Congressional Representatives of Mandaluyong City
District	Current Representative	Barangays	Population (2020)
Lone	Alexandria P. Gonzales (since 2025); Wack-Wack Greenhils	List: Addition Hills; Bagong Silang; Barangka Drive; Barangka Ibaba; Barangka Ilaya; Barangka Itaas; Buayang Bato; Burol; Daang Bakal; Hagdang Bato Itaas; Hagdang Bato Libis; Harapin Ang Bukas; Highway Hills; Hulo; Mabini-J. Rizal; Malamig; Mauway; Namayan; New Zañiga; Old Zañiga; Pag-asa; Plainview; Pleasant Hills; Poblacion; San Jose; Vergara; Wack-Wack Greenhills	425,758
