= 2025 Philippine local elections in Metro Manila =

- May 12, 2025
- Mayoral elections
- 16 city mayors and 1 municipal mayor
Party	Seats	+/–
PFP	4	+4
Nacionalista	3	0
NPC	2	+1
1Munti	1	0
Aksyon	1	−1
Lakas	1	0
Navoteño	1	0
NUP	1	+1
SBP	1	0
UNA	1	0
Independent	1	+1
This lists parties that won seats. See the complete results below.
- Vice mayoral elections
- 16 city vice mayors and 1 municipal vice mayor
Party	Seats	+/–
Lakas	3	+3
Nacionalista	3	−1
NPC	3	+2
PFP	3	+3
Aksyon	1	0
Navoteño	1	0
SBP	1	0
Independent	2	+2
This lists parties that won seats. See the complete results below.
- City Council elections
- 274 city councilors and 12 municipal councilors
Party	Seats	+/–
Nacionalista	54	+8
PFP	35	+33
SBP	28	+3
Lakas	27	+18
Aksyon	25	+9
NPC	24	+2
1Munti	16	0
NUP	14	+11
Asenso	12	−22
Navoteño	12	0
MKTZNU	9	−6
UNA	8	−7
PDP–Laban	3	−42
PMP	3	+3
Liberal	2	−2
TAPAT	2	New
AKAY	1	New
Akbayan	1	New
KANP	1	+1
Independent	9	+1
This lists parties that won seats. See the complete results below.

The 2025 Philippine local elections in Metro Manila were held on May 12, 2025.

== Summary ==
=== Mayors ===
City/municipality	Incumbent	Incumbent's party	Winner	Winner's party	Winning margin
Caloocan	Along Malapitan	Nacionalista	Along Malapitan	Nacionalista	20.28%
Las Piñas	Imelda Aguilar	NPC	April Aguilar	NPC	15.22%
Makati	Abigail Binay	NPC	Nancy Binay	UNA	14.33%
Malabon	Jeannie Sandoval	Nacionalista	Jeannie Sandoval	Nacionalista	29.52%
Mandaluyong	Benjamin Abalos	PFP	Carmelita Abalos	PFP	Unopposed
Manila	Honey Lacuna	Asenso Manileño	Isko Moreno	Aksyon	37.83%
Marikina	Marcelino Teodoro	NUP	Maan Teodoro	NUP	12.34%
Muntinlupa	Ruffy Biazon	One Muntinlupa	Ruffy Biazon	One Muntinlupa	Unopposed
Navotas	John Rey Tiangco	Navoteño	John Rey Tiangco	Navoteño	Unopposed
Parañaque	Eric Olivarez	Lakas	Edwin Olivarez	Lakas	29.75%
Pasay	Emi Rubiano	PFP	Emi Rubiano	PFP	20.28%
Pasig	Vico Sotto	Independent	Vico Sotto	Independent	84.34%
Pateros (municipality)	Ike Ponce	Aksyon	Gerald German	PFP	11.74%
Quezon City	Joy Belmonte	SBP	Joy Belmonte	SBP	93.59%
San Juan	Francis Zamora	PFP	Francis Zamora	PFP	74.86%
Taguig	Lani Cayetano	Nacionalista	Lani Cayetano	Nacionalista	59.06%
Valenzuela	Wes Gatchalian	NPC	Wes Gatchalian	NPC	Unopposed

=== Vice mayors ===
City/municipality	Incumbent	Incumbent's party	Winner	Winner's party	Winning margin
Caloocan	Karina Teh	Nacionalista	Karina Teh	Nacionalista	27.37%
Las Piñas	April Aguilar	NPC	Imelda Aguilar	NPC	23.36%
Makati	Monique Lagdameo	MKTZNU	Kid Peña	NPC	46.00%
Malabon	Bernard dela Cruz	PDP–Laban	Edward Nolasco	Lakas	10.19%
Mandaluyong	Carmelita Abalos	PFP	Anthony Suva	PFP	Unopposed
Manila	Yul Servo	Asenso Manileño	Chi Atienza	Aksyon	38.16%
Marikina	Marion Andres	NUP	Del de Guzman	Lakas	3.05%
Muntinlupa	Artemio Simundac	PFP	Phanie Teves	Independent	16.07%
Navotas	Tito Sanchez	Navoteño	Tito Sanchez	Navoteño	Unopposed
Parañaque	Joan Villafuerte	Lakas	Benjo Bernabe	PFP	2.80%
Pasay	Ding del Rosario	Lakas	Mark Calixto	Lakas	18.98%
Pasig	Robert Jaworski Jr.	Independent	Robert Jaworski Jr.	Independent	59.22%
Pateros (municipality)	Carlo Santos	Nacionalista	Carlo Santos	Nacionalista	21.62%
Quezon City	Gian Sotto	SBP	Gian Sotto	SBP	90.78%
San Juan	Angelo Agcaoili	PFP	Angelo Agcaoili	PFP	54.90%
Taguig	Arvin Ian Alit	Nacionalista	Arvin Ian Alit	Nacionalista	41.80%
Valenzuela	Lorie Natividad-Borja	NPC	Marlon Alejandrino	NPC	63.34%

=== City councils ===
City/municipality	Seats	Party control		Composition
City/municipality	Seats	Previous	Result	Composition
Caloocan	18 elected 2 ex-officio	No majority	Nacionalista	Nacionalista (13); Liberal (2); Aksyon (1); NUP (1); Lakas (1)
Las Piñas	12 elected 2 ex-officio	Nacionalista	No majority	Nacionalista (6); NPC (6)
Makati	16 elected 2 ex-officio	MKTZNU	No majority	MKTZNU (9); UNA (7)
Malabon	12 elected 2 ex-officio	No majority	No majority	Nacionalista (3); PFP (2); PMP (2); NPC (1); UNA (1); NUP (1); PDP–Laban (1); Lakas (1)
Mandaluyong	12 elected 2 ex-officio	PDP–Laban	PFP	PFP (11); PDP–Laban (1)
Manila	36 elected 2 ex-officio	Asenso Manileño	Aksyon	Aksyon (23); Asenso Manileño (12); Independent (1)
Marikina	16 elected 2 ex-officio	UNA	NUP	NUP (10); Lakas (5); Independent (1)
Muntinlupa	16 elected 2 ex-officio	One Muntinlupa	One Muntinlupa	One Muntinlupa (16)
Navotas	12 elected 2 ex-officio	Navoteño	Navoteño	Navoteño (12)
Parañaque	16 elected 2 ex-officio	PDP–Laban	Lakas	Lakas (11); PFP (2); NPC (1); Independent (2)
Pasay	12 elected 2 ex-officio	PDP–Laban	No majority	Lakas (5); PFP (5); Tapat Kayong Pinaglilingkuran (2)
Pasig	12 elected 2 ex-officio	NPC	No majority	NPC (6); PDP–Laban (1); AKAY (1); Akbayan (1); Independent (3)
Pateros (municipality)	12 elected 2 ex-officio	No majority	No majority	Nacionalista (7); PFP (3); NUP (1); KNP (1)
Quezon City	36 elected 2 ex-officio	SBP	SBP	SBP (28); Lakas (3); Aksyon (1); PFP (1); Nacionalista (1); Independent (2)
San Juan	12 elected 2 ex-officio	PDP–Laban	PFP	PFP (11); PMP (1)
Taguig	24 elected 2 ex-officio	Nacionalista	Nacionalista	Nacionalista (24)
Valenzuela	12 elected 2 ex-officio	NPC	NPC	NPC (10); NUP (1); Lakas (1)

== Caloocan ==
=== Mayor ===
Incumbent Mayor Along Malapitan of the Nacionalista Party ran for a second term. He was previously affiliated with the PDP–Laban.

Malapitan won re-election against former Senator Antonio Trillanes (Aksyon Demokratiko) and three other candidates.

Candidate	Party	Votes	%
Along Malapitan (incumbent)	Nacionalista Party	348,592	59.50
Antonio Trillanes	Aksyon Demokratiko	229,774	39.22
Danny Villanueva	Independent	3,128	0.53
Richard Cañete	Independent	2,324	0.40
Ronnie Malunes	Independent	2,017	0.34
Total		585,835	100.00
Valid votes		585,835	96.64
Invalid/blank votes		20,378	3.36
Total votes		606,213	100.00
Registered voters/turnout		765,249	79.22
Nacionalista hold			
Source: Commission on Elections

=== Vice Mayor ===
Incumbent Vice Mayor Karina Teh of the Nacionalista Party ran for a second term.

Teh won re-election against former city councilor PJ Malonzo (Aksyon Demokratiko) and three other candidates.

Candidate	Party	Votes	%
Karina Teh (incumbent)	Nacionalista Party	351,299	62.31
PJ Malonzo	Aksyon Demokratiko	196,957	34.94
Dante Lustre	Independent	5,782	1.03
Joseph Timbol	Independent	5,283	0.94
Rolando Tobias	Independent	4,428	0.79
Total		563,749	100.00
Valid votes		563,749	93.00
Invalid/blank votes		42,464	7.00
Total votes		606,213	100.00
Registered voters/turnout		765,249	79.22
Nacionalista hold			
Source: Commission on Elections

=== City Council ===
The Caloocan City Council is composed of 20 councilors, 18 of whom are elected.

The Nacionalista Party won 13 seats, maintaining its majority in the city council.

Party	Votes	%	Seats	+/–
Nacionalista Party	1,584,426	55.72	13	+3
Aksyon Demokratiko	528,109	18.57	1	–2
Liberal Party	218,648	7.69	2	New
National Unity Party	88,965	3.13	1	0
Lakas–CMD	82,876	2.91	1	–1
People's Reform Party	25,370	0.89	0	New
Makabayan	23,593	0.83	0	New
Independent	291,341	10.25	0	0
Total	2,843,328	100.00	18	0
Total votes	606,213	–		
Registered voters/turnout	765,249	79.22		
Source: Commission on Elections

==== 1st district ====
Caloocan's 1st councilor district consists of the same area as Caloocan's 1st legislative district. Six councilors are elected from this councilor district.

19 candidates were included in the ballot.

Candidate	Party	Votes	%
Enteng Malapitan (incumbent)	Nacionalista Party	177,817	12.94
Topet Adalem (incumbent)	Nacionalista Party	159,198	11.58
Leah Bacolod (incumbent)	Nacionalista Party	157,984	11.49
Vince Hernandez (incumbent)	Nacionalista Party	135,614	9.87
Alex Caralde (incumbent)	Nacionalista Party	135,213	9.84
Kaye Nubla (incumbent)	Aksyon Demokratiko	129,845	9.45
Marjorie Barretto	Nacionalista Party	112,624	8.19
Mining Faustino	Aksyon Demokratiko	74,113	5.39
Mickey Bunag	Aksyon Demokratiko	66,338	4.83
Angie Leonardo	Aksyon Demokratiko	60,445	4.40
Edsan Pineda	Independent	33,928	2.47
Tyrone de Leon Sr.	Independent	24,892	1.81
Ricardo Margallo	Makabayan	23,593	1.72
Jericho Sy	Independent	20,824	1.52
Roman Domasig Jr.	Independent	16,132	1.17
Buddy Lipata	Independent	12,157	0.88
Anser Tomas	Independent	11,753	0.86
George Miran	Independent	11,170	0.81
Patricio Tapiengco III	Independent	10,732	0.78
Total		1,374,372	100.00
Total votes		297,493	–
Registered voters/turnout		377,294	78.85
Source: Commission on Elections

==== 2nd district ====
Caloocan's 2nd councilor district consists of the same area as Caloocan's 2nd legislative district. Six councilors are elected from this councilor district.

19 candidates were included in the ballot.

Candidate	Party	Votes	%
Lanz Almeda (incumbent)	National Unity Party	88,965	9.85
Ken Aruelo	Lakas–CMD	82,876	9.17
Alexander Mangasar	Liberal Party	82,504	9.13
Cons Asistio	Nacionalista Party	81,079	8.98
Charm Quimpo	Liberal Party	80,462	8.91
Carol Cunanan (incumbent)	Nacionalista Party	73,575	8.14
Arnold Divina (incumbent)	Nacionalista Party	70,083	7.76
James Abel	Nacionalista Party	59,805	6.62
Wewel de Leon (incumbent)	Aksyon Demokratiko	59,166	6.55
Lem Simpauco	Liberal Party	55,682	6.16
Hari Cudiamat	Independent	44,292	4.90
Mayen Mercado	Aksyon Demokratiko	38,874	4.30
Rene Celis	People's Reform Party	25,370	2.81
Ferdie del Rosario	Independent	21,143	2.34
Jefferson Paspie	Aksyon Demokratiko	17,261	1.91
Dennis Padilla	Independent	9,346	1.03
Joseph Tenorio	Independent	5,290	0.59
Jennet Tam	Independent	4,459	0.49
Joe Palicte	Independent	3,150	0.35
Total		903,382	100.00
Total votes		188,617	–
Registered voters/turnout		237,712	79.35
Source: Commission on Elections

==== 3rd district ====
Caloocan's 3rd councilor district consists of the same area as Caloocan's 3rd legislative district. Six councilors are elected from this councilor district.

15 candidates were included in the ballot.

Candidate	Party	Votes	%
King Echiverri (incumbent)	Nacionalista Party	82,483	14.58
Win Abel (incumbent)	Nacionalista Party	76,880	13.59
Onet Henson (incumbent)	Nacionalista Party	68,489	12.11
Bullet Prado (incumbent)	Nacionalista Party	67,873	12.00
May Africa (incumbent)	Nacionalista Party	65,193	11.53
Tess Ceralde (incumbent)	Nacionalista Party	60,516	10.70
Walastik Domingo	Independent	35,550	6.29
Alou Nubla	Aksyon Demokratiko	34,501	6.10
Rowel Brin	Aksyon Demokratiko	24,897	4.40
Rose Mercado	Aksyon Demokratiko	22,669	4.01
Merly Padilla	Independent	6,597	1.17
Carina Sacatropes	Independent	5,205	0.92
Julita Omit	Independent	5,149	0.91
Jesus Teritorio	Independent	4,821	0.85
Albert Gabuay	Independent	4,751	0.84
Total		565,574	100.00
Total votes		120,103	–
Registered voters/turnout		150,243	79.94
Source: Commission on Elections

== Las Piñas ==
=== Mayor ===
Term-limited incumbent Mayor Imelda Aguilar of the Nationalist People's Coalition (NPC) ran for vice mayor of Las Piñas. She was previously affiliated with the Nacionalista Party.

The NPC nominated Aguilar's daughter, Las Piñas vice mayor April Aguilar, who won the election against her cousin, former city councilor Carlo Aguilar (Nacionalista Party) and five other candidates.

Candidate	Party	Votes	%
April Aguilar	Nationalist People's Coalition	117,800	48.55
Carlo Aguilar	Nacionalista Party	80,880	33.33
Rey Rivera	Independent	25,205	10.39
Armando Ducat Jr.	Independent	10,548	4.35
Antonio Abellar Jr.	Partido Maharlika	3,725	1.54
Conrado Miranda	Independent	2,827	1.17
Rolando Barredo Jr.	Independent	1,673	0.69
Total		242,658	100.00
Valid votes		242,658	94.99
Invalid/blank votes		12,797	5.01
Total votes		255,455	100.00
Registered voters/turnout		318,542	80.20
NPC hold			
Source: Commission on Elections

=== Vice Mayor ===
Incumbent April Aguilar of the Nationalist People's Coalition (NPC) ran for mayor of Las Piñas. She was previously affiliated with the Nacionalista Party.

The NPC nominated Aguilar's mother, Las Piñas mayor Imelda Aguilar, who won the election against city councilor Louie Bustamante (Nacionalista Party), former Las Piñas vice mayor Louie Casimiro (Independent) and five other candidates.

Candidate	Party	Votes	%
Imelda Aguilar	Nationalist People's Coalition	123,622	51.98
Louie Bustamante	Nacionalista Party	68,058	28.62
Louie Casimiro	Independent	24,907	10.47
Ed Angeles	Independent	11,305	4.75
Ben Chavez	Independent	4,327	1.82
Cyril David	Independent	2,252	0.95
Ping Arteta	Independent	2,027	0.85
Dong Batalan	Independent	1,321	0.56
Total		237,819	100.00
Valid votes		237,819	93.10
Invalid/blank votes		17,636	6.90
Total votes		255,455	100.00
Registered voters/turnout		318,542	80.20
NPC hold			
Source: Commission on Elections

=== City Council ===
The Las Piñas City Council is composed of 14 councilors, 12 of whom are elected.

The Nacionalista Party tied with the Nationalist People's Coalition at six seats each, losing its majority in the city council.

Party	Votes	%	Seats	+/–
Nacionalista Party	465,669	38.56	6	–2
Nationalist People's Coalition	452,558	37.47	6	New
PDP–Laban	14,817	1.23	0	New
Makabayan	12,093	1.00	0	New
Partido Maharlika	2,390	0.20	0	0
Independent	260,263	21.55	0	–3
Total	1,207,790	100.00	12	0
Total votes	255,455	–		
Registered voters/turnout	318,542	80.20		
Source: Commission on Elections

==== 1st district ====
Las Piñas's 1st city district is composed of the barangays of BF International Village, Daniel Fajardo, Elias Aldana, Ilaya, Manuyo Uno, Manuyo Dos, Pamplona Uno, Pamplona Tres, Pulang Lupa Uno, Pulang Lupa Dos, Talon Uno and Zapote. Six councilors are elected from this councilor district.

28 candidates were included in the ballot.

Candidate	Party	Votes	%
Alelee Aguilar	Nationalist People's Coalition	71,492	11.41
Albie Aguilar	Nacionalista Party	54,800	8.74
Jess Bustamante (incumbent)	Nacionalista Party	45,730	7.30
Eric de Leon	Nacionalista Party	42,337	6.76
Mac-mac Santos	Nationalist People's Coalition	41,287	6.59
Robert Cristobal	Nationalist People's Coalition	40,946	6.53
Brian Bayog	Nationalist People's Coalition	40,004	6.38
Rex Riguera (incumbent)	Nacionalista Party	39,366	6.28
Oscar Peña (incumbent)	Nacionalista Party	37,749	6.02
Rey Balanag	Nacionalista Party	31,721	5.06
Zardi Abellera	Nationalist People's Coalition	27,700	4.42
Marlon Rosales	Nationalist People's Coalition	25,032	3.99
Davey Medidas	PDP–Laban	14,817	2.36
Pearl Tolentino	Independent	14,373	2.29
Mar Chavez	Independent	12,425	1.98
Combat Someros	Independent	12,255	1.96
Jinsei Castillo	Makabayan	12,093	1.93
Michael Castillo	Independent	11,089	1.77
Larry Eusebio	Independent	9,814	1.57
Mimi Santamaria	Independent	6,941	1.11
Larry Perez	Independent	5,726	0.91
Ame Gallano	Independent	5,507	0.88
Larry Esmeña	Independent	5,272	0.84
Jeric Antoni Ver Clave	Independent	4,793	0.76
Lauro Matundan III	Independent	3,904	0.62
Angelita Suñer	Independent	3,232	0.52
Angelito Jamco Jr.	Independent	3,188	0.51
Rodolfo Llupar	Independent	3,085	0.49
Total		626,678	100.00
Total votes		130,981	–
Registered voters/turnout		162,126	80.79
Source: Commission on Elections

==== 2nd district ====
Las Piñas's 2nd councilor district is composed of the barangays of Almanza Uno, Almanza Dos, Pamplona Dos, Pilar, Talon Dos, Talon Tres, Talon Kuatro and Talon Singko. Six councilors are elected from this councilor district.

32 candidates were included in the ballot.

Candidate	Party	Votes	%
Lord Aguilar (incumbent)	Nacionalista Party	58,631	10.09
Henry Medina (incumbent)	Nationalist People's Coalition	54,456	9.37
Ruben Ramos (incumbent)	Nacionalista Party	50,090	8.62
Emmanuel Luis Casimiro (incumbent)	Nationalist People's Coalition	37,868	6.52
Danok Hernandez	Nacionalista Party	31,437	5.41
Macky Saito	Nationalist People's Coalition	29,897	5.14
Gywyn Gonzales	Nacionalista Party	29,758	5.12
Euan Toralballa	Nationalist People's Coalition	29,381	5.06
Tito Martinez	Nationalist People's Coalition	28,304	4.87
Lester Aranda	Nationalist People's Coalition	26,191	4.51
Yolly Tan	Nacionalista Party	24,376	4.19
Bonifacio Riguera	Nacionalista Party	19,674	3.39
Tony Garcia	Independent	19,574	3.37
Bok Tugano	Independent	17,776	3.06
Berlin dela Cruz	Independent	18,266	3.14
Carlson Pascual	Independent	10,655	1.83
Edgardo Parungao	Independent	8,313	1.43
Adelia Rosales	Independent	8,233	1.42
Avelino Andal	Independent	7,875	1.36
Abet Goco	Independent	7,587	1.31
Jeff Boyo	Independent	7,461	1.28
Michaela Irish Alvarado	Independent	6,811	1.17
Elmer Gregorio	Independent	6,802	1.17
VJ Valle	Independent	6,117	1.05
Marlon Dayao	Independent	5,806	1.00
Lily Ventura	Independent	5,662	0.97
Alex Tato	Independent	5,110	0.88
Adoracion Bustillo	Independent	4,964	0.85
Irene Deciembre	Independent	4,961	0.85
Noli Fiesta	Independent	3,883	0.67
Simnar Gran	Independent	2,803	0.48
Danilo Calitizen	Partido Maharlika	2,390	0.41
Total		581,112	100.00
Total votes		124,474	–
Registered voters/turnout		156,416	79.58
Source: Commission on Elections

== Makati ==
=== Mayor ===
Term-limited incumbent Mayor Abigail Binay of the Nationalist People's Coalition (NPC) ran for the Senate. She was previously affiliated with the Makatizens United Party.

The NPC nominated Binay's husband, representative Luis Campos, who was defeated by his sister-in-law, Senator Nancy Binay of the United Nationalist Alliance. Actor Victor Neri (Independent) and Orlando Stephen Solidum (Independent) also ran for mayor.

Candidate	Party	Votes	%
Nancy Binay	United Nationalist Alliance	114,898	56.30
Luis Campos	Nationalist People's Coalition	85,664	41.97
Victor Neri	Independent	2,172	1.06
Orlando Stephen Solidum	Independent	1,352	0.66
Total		204,086	100.00
Valid votes		204,086	97.16
Invalid/blank votes		5,966	2.84
Total votes		210,052	100.00
Registered voters/turnout		270,240	77.73
UNA gain from NPC			
Source: Commission on Elections

=== Vice Mayor ===
Term-limited incumbent Vice Mayor Monique Lagdameo of the Makatizens United Party ran for the House of Representatives in Makati's 1st legislative district.

Lagdameo endorsed representative Kid Peña (Nationalist People's Coalition), who won the election against former representative Monsour del Rosario (United Nationalist Alliance).

Candidate	Party	Votes	%
Kid Peña	Nationalist People's Coalition	146,771	73.00
Monsour del Rosario	United Nationalist Alliance	54,290	27.00
Total		201,061	100.00
Valid votes		201,061	95.72
Invalid/blank votes		8,991	4.28
Total votes		210,052	100.00
Registered voters/turnout		270,240	77.73
NPC gain from MKTZNU			
Source: Commission on Elections

=== City Council ===
The Makati City Council is composed of 18 councilors, 16 of whom are elected.

The Makatizens United Party remained as the largest party in the city council with nine seats, but lost its majority.

Party	Votes	%	Seats	+/–
Makatizens United Party	709,889	56.20	9	–6
United Nationalist Alliance	478,882	37.91	7	New
Independent	74,287	5.88	0	0
Total	1,263,058	100.00	16	0
Total votes	210,052	–		
Registered voters/turnout	270,240	77.73		
Source: Commission on Elections

==== 1st district ====
Makati's 1st councilor district consists of the same area as Makati's 1st legislative district. Eight councilors are elected from this councilor district.

20 candidates were included in the ballot.

Candidate	Party	Votes	%
Virgilio Hilario Sr.	Makatizens United Party	96,429	9.41
Alcine Yabut (incumbent)	Makatizens United Party	85,688	8.36
Martin Arenas (incumbent)	Makatizens United Party	73,694	7.19
Mayeth Casal-Uy	United Nationalist Alliance	71,820	7.01
Arlene Ortega	United Nationalist Alliance	68,815	6.71
Ferdie Eusebio	United Nationalist Alliance	66,729	6.51
Armando Padilla (incumbent)	Makatizens United Party	64,531	6.29
Dino Imperial	United Nationalist Alliance	64,326	6.27
Rene Andrei Saguisag (incumbent)	Makatizens United Party	64,298	6.27
Duka Alvarez	Makatizens United Party	63,677	6.21
Joey Villena (incumbent)	Makatizens United Party	62,742	6.12
Carmina Ortega (incumbent)	Makatizens United Party	60,029	5.86
Romeo Medina	United Nationalist Alliance	59,505	5.80
Lennie Cosing	United Nationalist Alliance	51,146	4.99
Jessy Trinidad	Independent	20,961	2.04
Manny Dizon	Independent	14,317	1.40
Vic Calinawan	Independent	9,892	0.96
Dan Jason Cuaresma	Independent	9,503	0.93
JCL Lingad	Independent	8,930	0.87
Herman Marco Garcia	Independent	8,132	0.79
Total		1,025,164	100.00
Total votes		170,882	–
Registered voters/turnout		216,152	79.06
Source: Commission on Elections

==== 2nd district ====
Makati's 2nd councilor district consists of the same area as Makati's 2nd legislative district. The barangays of Cembo, Comembo, East Rembo, Pitogo, Post Proper Northside, Post Proper Southside, Rizal, South Cembo and West Rembo used to be a part of this councilor district until 2023, when they became part of Taguig. Eight councilors are elected from this councilor district.

15 candidates were included in the ballot.

Candidate	Party	Votes	%
Kristina Sarosa (incumbent)	Makatizens United Party	21,787	9.16
Doris Arayon (incumbent)	Makatizens United Party	19,632	8.25
Hein Angeles	Makatizens United Party	18,367	7.72
Badet Sese	United Nationalist Alliance	18,295	7.69
Bong Ariones (incumbent)	Makatizens United Party	17,386	7.31
Levy Ramboyong	United Nationalist Alliance	17,123	7.20
King Yabut	United Nationalist Alliance	16,619	6.99
Bel Vitales	Makatizens United Party	15,874	6.67
Bodik Baniqued (incumbent)	Makatizens United Party	15,630	6.57
Ruth Tolentino	United Nationalist Alliance	15,599	6.56
Jeff Baluyut	United Nationalist Alliance	15,579	6.55
Edralyn Marquez (incumbent)	Makatizens United Party	15,459	6.50
Maffy Soler Calimbahin	Makatizens United Party	14,666	6.16
Mario Hechanova	United Nationalist Alliance	13,326	5.60
Reynante Saludo	Independent	2,552	1.07
Total		237,894	100.00
Total votes		39,170	–
Registered voters/turnout		54,088	72.42
Source: Commission on Elections

== Malabon ==
=== Mayor ===
Incumbent Mayor Jeannie Sandoval of the Nacionalista Party ran for a second term.

Sandoval won re-election against representative Josephine Lacson-Noel (Nationalist People's Coalition).

Candidate	Party	Votes	%
Jeannie Sandoval (incumbent)	Nacionalista Party	120,757	64.76
Josephine Lacson-Noel	Nationalist People's Coalition	65,710	35.24
Total		186,467	100.00
Valid votes		186,467	96.04
Invalid/blank votes		7,685	3.96
Total votes		194,152	100.00
Registered voters/turnout		233,868	83.02
Nacionalista hold			
Source: Commission on Elections

=== Vice Mayor ===
Incumbent Vice Mayor Bernard dela Cruz of the PDP–Laban (PDP) ran for the House of Representatives in Malabon's lone legislative district.

The PDP nominated city councilor Dado Cunanan, who was defeated by city councilor Edward Nolasco of Lakas–CMD. City councilor Jap Garcia (National Unity Party) and Barangay Longos chairwoman Angelika Dela Cruz (Nationalist People's Coalition) also ran for vice mayor.

Candidate	Party	Votes	%
Edward Nolasco	Lakas–CMD	73,302	40.05
Angelika dela Cruz	Nationalist People's Coalition	54,658	29.86
Jap Garcia	National Unity Party	39,146	21.39
Dado Cunanan	PDP–Laban	15,912	8.69
Total		183,018	100.00
Valid votes		183,018	94.27
Invalid/blank votes		11,134	5.73
Total votes		194,152	100.00
Registered voters/turnout		233,868	83.02
Lakas gain from PDP–Laban			
Source: Commission on Elections

=== City Council ===
The Malabon City Council is composed of 14 councilors, 12 of whom are elected.

The Nacionalista Party remained as the largest party in the city council with 3 seats.

Party	Votes	%	Seats	+/–
Nationalist People's Coalition	239,320	27.14	1	–1
Nacionalista Party	168,599	19.12	3	0
Partido Federal ng Pilipinas	131,091	14.86	2	New
Pwersa ng Masang Pilipino	93,228	10.57	2	New
United Nationalist Alliance	50,207	5.69	1	0
National Unity Party	47,830	5.42	1	–1
PDP–Laban	44,437	5.04	1	New
Lakas–CMD	42,990	4.87	1	New
Liberal Party	28,221	3.20	0	–2
Independent	36,026	4.08	0	0
Total	881,949	100.00	12	0
Total votes	194,152	–		
Registered voters/turnout	233,868	83.02		
Source: Commission on Elections

==== 1st district ====
Malabon's 1st councilor district consists of the barangays of Baritan, Bayan-bayanan, Catmon, Concepcion, Dampalit, Flores, Hulong Duhat, Ibaba, Maysilo, Muzon, Niugan, Panghulo, San Agustin, Santulan and Tañong. Six councilors are elected from this councilor district.

12 candidates were included in the ballot.

Candidate	Party	Votes	%
Maricar Torres (incumbent)	Nacionalista Party	55,525	11.94
Ian Emmanuel Borja	Nacionalista Party	51,989	11.18
Leslie Yambao (incumbent)	United Nationalist Alliance	50,207	10.80
Paulo Oreta (incumbent)	Pwersa ng Masang Pilipino	48,579	10.45
Gerry Bernardo (incumbent)	Partido Federal ng Pilipinas	45,994	9.89
Payapa Ona	Nacionalista Party	43,734	9.40
Nino Lacson Noel (incumbent)	Nationalist People's Coalition	43,148	9.28
Edwin Lacson Dimagiba	Nationalist People's Coalition	35,018	7.53
Joey Sabaricos	Liberal Party	28,221	6.07
Concon San Juan	Nationalist People's Coalition	25,059	5.39
Al Caste Castillo	Nationalist People's Coalition	23,006	4.95
Tok Hio (withdrew)	Independent	14,613	3.14
Total		465,093	100.00
Total votes		103,591	–
Registered voters/turnout		124,335	83.32
Source: Commission on Elections

==== 2nd district ====
Malabon's 2nd councilor district consists of the barangays of Acacia, Longos, Potrero, Tinajeros, Tonsuya and Tugatog. Six councilors are elected from this councilor district.

16 candidates were included in the ballot.

Candidate	Party	Votes	%
Enzo Oreta	National Unity Party	47,830	11.47
Nadja Marie Vicencio (incumbent)	Pwersa ng Masang Pilipino	44,649	10.71
Jasper Cruz (incumbent)	Lakas–CMD	42,990	10.31
Len Yanga (incumbent)	Partido Federal ng Pilipinas	37,781	9.06
Sonia Lim	Nationalist People's Coalition	32,769	7.86
Rom Cunanan	PDP–Laban	31,942	7.66
Mark Roque	Nationalist People's Coalition	27,322	6.55
Monay Mañalac	Partido Federal ng Pilipinas	25,592	6.14
Alvin Mañalac	Nationalist People's Coalition	22,342	5.36
Al Niño Galauran	Partido Federal ng Pilipinas	21,724	5.21
Erika Dusaran	Nationalist People's Coalition	18,359	4.40
Star Dizon	Nacionalista Party	17,351	4.16
James Ronald Macasero	PDP–Laban	12,495	3.00
Archie Jade Añora	Independent	12,492	3.00
Ading Manzon	Nationalist People's Coalition	12,297	2.95
Paul Cabrera Jr.	Independent	8,921	2.14
Total		416,856	100.00
Total votes		90,561	–
Registered voters/turnout		109,533	82.68
Source: Commission on Elections

== Mandaluyong ==
=== Mayor ===
Incumbent Mayor Benjamin Abalos of the Partido Federal ng Pilipinas (PFP) retired. He was previously affiliated with PDP–Laban.

The PFP nominated Abalos' daughter-in-law, Mandaluyong vice mayor Carmelita Abalos, who won the election unopposed.

Candidate	Party	Votes	%
Carmelita Abalos	Partido Federal ng Pilipinas	143,315	100.00
Total		143,315	100.00
Valid votes		143,315	83.69
Invalid/blank votes		27,925	16.31
Total votes		171,240	100.00
Registered voters/turnout		223,624	76.57
PFP hold			
Source: Commission on Elections

=== Vice Mayor ===
Incumbent Vice Mayor Carmelita Abalos of the Partido Federal ng Pilipinas (PFP) ran for mayor of Mandaluyong. She was previously affiliated with PDP–Laban.

The PFP nominated city councilor Anthony Suva, who won the election unopposed.

Candidate	Party	Votes	%
Anthony Suva	Partido Federal ng Pilipinas	134,572	100.00
Total		134,572	100.00
Valid votes		134,572	78.59
Invalid/blank votes		36,668	21.41
Total votes		171,240	100.00
Registered voters/turnout		223,624	76.57
PFP hold			
Source: Commission on Elections

=== City Council ===
The Mandaluyong City Council is composed of 14 councilors, 12 of whom are elected.

The Partido Federal ng Pilipinas won 11 seats, gaining a majority in the city council.

Party	Votes	%	Seats	+/–
Partido Federal ng Pilipinas	576,355	78.82	11	+11
PDP–Laban	51,984	7.11	1	–7
Aksyon Demokratiko	32,037	4.38	0	–1
Independent	70,847	9.69	0	–2
Total	731,223	100.00	12	0
Total votes	171,240	–		
Registered voters/turnout	223,624	76.57		

==== 1st district ====
Mandaluyong's 1st councilor district consists of the barangays of Addition Hills, Bagong Silang, Burol, Daang Bakal, Hagdan Bato Itaas, Hagdan Bato Libis, Harapin Ang Bukas, Highway Hills, Mauway, New Zañiga, Pag-Asa, Pleasant Hills, Poblacion and Wack-Wack Greenhills. Six councilors are elected from this councilor district.

Ten candidates were included in the ballot.

Candidate	Party	Votes	%
Charisse Abalos	Partido Federal ng Pilipinas	78,830	17.81
Elton Yap (incumbent)	Partido Federal ng Pilipinas	71,520	16.16
Danny de Guzman (incumbent)	Partido Federal ng Pilipinas	65,250	14.74
Mariz Manalo (incumbent)	Partido Federal ng Pilipinas	58,994	13.33
Grace Antonio	Partido Federal ng Pilipinas	58,802	13.29
Junis Alim (incumbent)	Partido Federal ng Pilipinas	50,992	11.52
Chris Tan	Independent	26,130	5.90
Rolando Cristobal	Independent	11,356	2.57
Florencio Solomon	Independent	10,466	2.36
Delmer del Rosario	Independent	10,268	2.32
Total		442,608	100.00
Total votes		101,894	–
Registered voters/turnout		134,543	75.73
Source: Commission on Elections

==== 2nd district ====
Mandaluyong's 2nd councilor district consists of the barangays of Barangka Drive, Barangka Ibaba, Barangka Ilaya, Barangka Itaas, Buayang Bato, Hulo, Mabini–J.Rizal, Malamig, Namayan, Old Zañiga, Plainview, San Jose and Vergara. Six councilors are elected from this councilor district.

Nine candidates were included in the ballot.

Candidate	Party	Votes	%
Benjie Abalos (incumbent)	Partido Federal ng Pilipinas	45,959	15.92
Alex Santa Maria (incumbent)	Partido Federal ng Pilipinas	42,626	14.77
Botong Gonzales Cuejilo (incumbent)	Partido Federal ng Pilipinas	35,788	12.40
Dong Ocampo	PDP–Laban	34,818	12.06
Regie Antiojo (incumbent)	Partido Federal ng Pilipinas	34,186	11.84
Leslie Cruz (incumbent)	Partido Federal ng Pilipinas	33,408	11.58
Boyett Bacar	Aksyon Demokratiko	32,037	11.10
Boy de Quinto	PDP–Laban	17,166	5.95
Darius Apacionado	Independent	12,627	4.38
Total		288,615	100.00
Total votes		69,346	–
Registered voters/turnout		89,081	77.85
Source: Commission on Elections

== Manila ==
=== Mayor ===
Incumbent Mayor Honey Lacuna of Asenso Manileño ran for a second term.

Lacuna was defeated by former Manila mayor Isko Moreno of Aksyon Demokratiko. Tutok To Win representative Sam Verzosa (Independent), actor Raymond Bagatsing (Independent) and seven other candidates also ran for mayor.

Candidate	Party	Votes	%
Isko Moreno	Aksyon Demokratiko	530,825	59.02
Honey Lacuna (incumbent)	Asenso Manileño	190,617	21.19
Sam Verzosa	Independent	164,434	18.28
Raymond Bagatsing	Independent	6,242	0.69
Michael Say	Ilocano Defenders	2,325	0.26
Mahra Tamondong	Kilusang Bagong Lipunan	1,853	0.21
Ervin Tan	Independent	822	0.09
Enrico Reyes	Independent	702	0.08
Jerry Garcia	Independent	597	0.07
Alvin Karingal	Independent	508	0.06
Jopoy Ocampo	Independent	428	0.05
Total		899,353	100.00
Valid votes		899,353	96.81
Invalid/blank votes		29,643	3.19
Total votes		928,996	100.00
Registered voters/turnout		1,142,174	81.34
Aksyon gain from Asenso Manileño			
Source: Commission on Elections

=== Vice Mayor ===
Incumbent Vice Mayor Yul Servo of Asenso Manileño ran for a second term.

Servo was defeated by TV host Chi Atienza of Aksyon Demokratiko. Former city councilor Pablo Ocampo (Partido Federal ng Pilipinas), Barangay 283 chairman Niño Anthony Magno (Independent) and three other candidates also ran in the election.

Candidate	Party	Votes	%
Chi Atienza	Aksyon Demokratiko	584,145	66.65
Yul Servo (incumbent)	Asenso Manileño	249,691	28.49
Niño Anthony Magno	Independent	16,479	1.88
Pablo Ocampo	Partido Federal ng Pilipinas	9,120	1.04
Arvin Reyes	Independent	7,921	0.90
Solomon Say	Ilocano Defenders	6,966	0.79
Remy Oyales	Kilusang Bagong Lipunan	2,073	0.24
Total		876,395	100.00
Valid votes		876,395	94.34
Invalid/blank votes		52,601	5.66
Total votes		928,996	100.00
Registered voters/turnout		1,142,174	81.34
Aksyon gain from Asenso Manileño			
Source: Commission on Elections

=== City Council ===
The Manila City Council is composed of 38 councilors, 36 of whom are elected.

Aksyon Demokratiko won 23 seats, gaining a majority in the city council.

Party	Votes	%	Seats	+/–
Aksyon Demokratiko	2,246,546	50.12	23	New
Asenso Manileño	1,581,449	35.28	12	–22
Partido Federal ng Pilipinas	58,430	1.30	0	0
Filipino Rights Protection Advocates of Manila Movement	53,089	1.18	0	New
Kilusang Bagong Lipunan	19,010	0.42	0	New
PROMDI	13,082	0.29	0	0
PDP–Laban	9,007	0.20	0	0
Makabayan	6,577	0.15	0	New
Partido Maharlika	3,498	0.08	0	0
Independent	491,957	10.97	1	–1
Total	4,482,645	100.00	36	0
Total votes	928,996	–		
Registered voters/turnout	1,142,174	81.34		
Source: Commission on Elections

==== 1st district ====
Manila's 1st councilor district consists of the same area as Manila's 1st legislative district. Six councilors are elected from this councilor district.

26 candidates were included in the ballot.

Candidate	Party	Votes	%
Joaquin Domagoso	Aksyon Demokratiko	114,593	10.54
Jesus Fajardo (incumbent)	Aksyon Demokratiko	108,710	10.00
Banzai Nieva (incumbent)	Aksyon Demokratiko	105,063	9.66
Irma Alfonso (incumbent)	Aksyon Demokratiko	88,902	8.17
Jhun Ibay	Aksyon Demokratiko	85,561	7.87
MC Limyuen	Asenso Manileño	73,426	6.75
Niño dela Cruz (incumbent)	Asenso Manileño	70,699	6.50
Marjun Isidro (incumbent)	Asenso Manileño	69,328	6.37
Peter Ong	Asenso Manileño	63,276	5.82
Ian Alban	Filipino Rights Protection Advocates of Manila Movement	53,089	4.88
Bobby Hernane	Aksyon Demokratiko	37,832	3.48
Eugene Santiago	Asenso Manileño	36,453	3.35
Alex Dionisio	Independent	33,704	3.10
Marcelino Pedrozo Jr.	Asenso Manileño	32,921	3.03
Ferdie Sandoval	Independent	28,031	2.58
Jay Ching Pineda	Independent	19,109	1.76
Eduardo Solis	Independent	18,970	1.74
Michael John Pornilos	Independent	11,749	1.08
Mike de Leon	Independent	6,816	0.63
Eduardo Gado	Makabayan	6,577	0.60
Ian Halili	Independent	5,621	0.52
Monte Tabios	Independent	4,976	0.46
Sylvia Felisa Manansala	Kilusang Bagong Lipunan	3,728	0.34
Paolo Crisanto Nuguid	Independent	2,935	0.27
Rosmar Pamulaklakin (withdrew)	Independent	2,883	0.27
Art Flora	Partido Maharlika	2,631	0.24
Total		1,087,583	100.00
Total votes		224,005	–
Registered voters/turnout		267,797	83.65
Source: Commission on Elections

==== 2nd district ====
Manila's 2nd councilor district consists of the same area as Manila's 2nd legislative district. Six councilors are elected from this councilor district.

12 candidates were included in the ballot.

Candidate	Party	Votes	%
Awi Sia (incumbent)	Aksyon Demokratiko	72,745	12.18
Uno Lim (incumbent)	Asenso Manileño	62,564	10.47
Ruben Buenaventura (incumbent)	Asenso Manileño	60,500	10.13
Edward Tan	Aksyon Demokratiko	56,628	9.48
Rod Lacsamana (incumbent)	Asenso Manileño	53,645	8.98
Bolong Sy	Aksyon Demokratiko	49,599	8.30
Roma Robles (incumbent)	Asenso Manileño	46,939	7.86
Robbie Bautista-Ong	Aksyon Demokratiko	43,609	7.30
Marc Lacson	Asenso Manileño	42,785	7.16
Nico Evangelista	Aksyon Demokratiko	40,950	6.86
David Chua	Asenso Manileño	34,811	5.83
Rommel Miranda	Aksyon Demokratiko	32,518	5.44
Total		597,293	100.00
Total votes		122,409	–
Registered voters/turnout		149,095	82.10
Source: Commission on Elections

==== 3rd district ====
Manila's 3rd councilor district consists of the same area as Manila's 3rd legislative district. Six councilors are elected from this councilor district.

18 candidates were included in the ballot.

Candidate	Party	Votes	%
Jong Isip (incumbent)	Asenso Manileño	74,536	12.57
Pamela Fugoso (incumbent)	Asenso Manileño	73,379	12.37
Maile Atienza (incumbent)	Asenso Manileño	70,075	11.82
Tol Zarcal (incumbent)	Aksyon Demokratiko	67,747	11.42
Karen Chua Alibarbar	Asenso Manileño	58,280	9.83
Jeff Lau	Asenso Manileño	42,295	7.13
Johnny dela Cruz	Aksyon Demokratiko	37,177	6.27
Chris Tagle	Aksyon Demokratiko	32,989	5.56
Paul Alvarez	Aksyon Demokratiko	32,420	5.47
Mocha Uson	Aksyon Demokratiko	31,103	5.24
Joey Uy Jamisola	Independent	23,538	3.97
Nelson Ty	Independent	11,041	1.86
Henrick Cigres	Independent	10,788	1.82
Antonio Cua Lee	PDP–Laban	9,007	1.52
Albert Alvin Ang Go	Independent	8,449	1.42
Nomer David	Independent	3,919	0.66
Rodelito Jurilla	Independent	3,277	0.55
Eleazar de Pereira	Independent	2,994	0.50
Total		593,014	100.00
Total votes		123,029	–
Registered voters/turnout		156,053	78.84
Source: Commission on Elections

==== 4th district ====
Manila's 4th councilor district consists of the same area as Manila's 4th legislative district. Six councilors are elected from this councilor district.

31 candidates were included in the ballot.

Candidate	Party	Votes	%
Lady Quintos (incumbent)	Aksyon Demokratiko	64,266	9.46
Don Juan Bagatsing (incumbent)	Aksyon Demokratiko	59,639	8.78
Science Reyes (incumbent)	Asenso Manileño	57,127	8.41
Francis Michael Almiron	Aksyon Demokratiko	51,706	7.61
Ryan Ponce	Independent	49,850	7.34
Eunice Castro	Aksyon Demokratiko	46,776	6.88
Anton Capistrano	Independent	46,655	6.87
Dianne Nieto	Asenso Manileño	43,840	6.45
Christian Floirendo	Asenso Manileño	37,330	5.49
Freddie Bucad	Asenso Manileño	32,350	4.76
Roy Bacani	Asenso Manileño	28,354	4.17
Bimbo Eduardo Quintos	Partido Federal ng Pilipinas	23,395	3.44
Romeo Bagay	Aksyon Demokratiko	21,775	3.20
Bong Marzan	Asenso Manileño	20,775	3.06
Rino Tolentino	Aksyon Demokratiko	18,786	2.76
Gerardo Gamez	PROMDI	13,082	1.93
Jerrick Rotap	Independent	12,156	1.79
Rom Acio	Independent	10,078	1.48
Carlo dela Cruz	Independent	9,296	1.37
Edwin Cayetano	Kilusang Bagong Lipunan	5,579	0.82
Wendell Ramos (withdrew)	Independent	5,272	0.78
Francisco Ramos	Independent	4,771	0.70
Clark Ferrer	Independent	4,273	0.63
Andrew Lopez	Partido Federal ng Pilipinas	2,579	0.38
Reymon Cortez	Independent	1,907	0.28
Philip Jerico Sy	Independent	1,837	0.27
Al Tan	Partido Federal ng Pilipinas	1,622	0.24
Christopher Gabriel	Independent	1,522	0.22
Mojtaba Habibi	Independent	1,192	0.18
Ricardo Mariño	Partido Maharlika	867	0.13
Napoleon Tenay	Independent	843	0.12
Total		679,500	100.00
Total votes		139,619	–
Registered voters/turnout		172,679	80.85
Source: Commission on Elections

==== 5th district ====
Manila's 5th councilor district consists of the same area as Manila's 5th legislative district. Six councilors are elected from this councilor district.

31 candidates were included in the ballot.

Candidate	Party	Votes	%
Che Borromeo	Aksyon Demokratiko	110,023	12.84
Jaybee Hizon (incumbent)	Aksyon Demokratiko	108,022	12.61
Bobby Espiritu (incumbent)	Aksyon Demokratiko	105,441	12.31
Mon Yupangco (incumbent)	Aksyon Demokratiko	103,475	12.08
Charry Ortega (incumbent)	Asenso Manileño	82,383	9.62
Mac Ignacio	Aksyon Demokratiko	77,781	9.08
Bel Isip	Asenso Manileño	76,305	8.91
Zeb Laureano Lao	Aksyon Demokratiko	58,363	6.81
Felix Tobillo Jr.	Independent	19,481	2.27
Rubee Cagasca	Independent	17,816	2.08
Sonia Tamondong	Independent	16,652	1.94
Ariel Dakis	Independent	10,081	1.18
Drew Ocampo	Independent	9,267	1.08
Pau Ejercito	Partido Federal ng Pilipinas	8,553	1.00
Diana Dayao	Independent	7,868	0.92
Roderick Valbuena	Independent	5,870	0.69
Harry Huecas	Kilusang Bagong Lipunan	3,957	0.46
Anjun Luarca	Independent	3,830	0.45
Gladina Villar	Partido Federal ng Pilipinas	3,545	0.41
Rut Remegio	Independent	3,442	0.40
Jett Magno	Kilusang Bagong Lipunan	3,252	0.38
John Cyruz Villanueva	Independent	3,191	0.37
Malou Ocsan	Partido Federal ng Pilipinas	2,585	0.30
Strauss Tugnao	Kilusang Bagong Lipunan	2,494	0.29
Jona Kuizon	Independent	2,303	0.27
Shaun Olarte	Independent	1,969	0.23
Gloria Enriquez	Partido Federal ng Pilipinas	1,943	0.23
Vincent Dinglasa	Independent	1,887	0.22
Injim Bunayog	Independent	1,877	0.22
Wenifredo Limit	Independent	1,507	0.18
Jun Poligratis	Independent	1,472	0.17
Total		856,635	100.00
Total votes		181,596	–
Registered voters/turnout		227,051	79.98
Source: Commission on Elections

==== 6th district ====
Manila's 6th councilor district consists of the same area as Manila's 6th legislative district. Six councilors are elected from this councilor district.

18 candidates were included in the ballot.

Candidate	Party	Votes	%
Lou Veloso (incumbent)	Aksyon Demokratiko	72,502	10.84
Joel Par (incumbent)	Aksyon Demokratiko	72,185	10.80
Christian Paul Uy	Aksyon Demokratiko	71,181	10.65
Caloy Volt Castañeda	Aksyon Demokratiko	67,628	10.11
Fog Abante (incumbent)	Asenso Manileño	62,329	9.32
Fernando Mercado	Aksyon Demokratiko	61,912	9.26
Philip Lacuna (incumbent)	Asenso Manileño	55,548	8.31
Francis Olaso	Asenso Manileño	50,426	7.54
Martin Ignacio Romualdez	Asenso Manileño	42,203	6.31
Kid Marasigan	Aksyon Demokratiko	36,939	5.52
Lito Linis	Asenso Manileño	26,567	3.97
James Lagasca	Independent	12,444	1.86
Raffy Jimenez Crespo	Partido Federal ng Pilipinas	9,692	1.45
Emilet Quirante	Independent	7,121	1.07
Michael Valderama	Independent	6,398	0.96
Fernando Vergel	Independent	6,227	0.93
Romualdo Billanes	Partido Federal ng Pilipinas	4,516	0.68
Edwin Salve	Independent	2,802	0.42
Total		668,620	100.00
Total votes		138,338	–
Registered voters/turnout		169,499	81.62
Source: Commission on Elections

== Marikina ==
=== Mayor ===
Term-limited incumbent Mayor Marcelino Teodoro of the National Unity Party (NUP) ran for the House of Representatives in Marikina's 1st legislative district. He was previously affiliated with the United Nationalist Alliance.

On March 25, 2025, Teodoro was suspended by the Office of the Ombudsman for six months over alleged misuse of public funds.

The NUP nominated Teodoro's wife, representative Maan Teodoro, who won the election against representative Stella Quimbo (Lakas–CMD).

Candidate	Party	Votes	%
Maan Teodoro	National Unity Party	142,814	56.17
Stella Quimbo	Lakas–CMD	111,420	43.83
Total		254,234	100.00
Valid votes		254,234	98.36
Invalid/blank votes		4,232	1.64
Total votes		258,466	100.00
Registered voters/turnout		315,980	81.80
NUP hold			
Source: Commission on Elections

=== Vice Mayor ===
Incumbent Vice Mayor Marion Andres of the National Unity Party ran for a third term. He was previously affiliated with the United Nationalist Alliance.

On March 25, 2025, Andres was suspended by the Office of the Ombudsman for six months over alleged misuse of public funds.

Andres was defeated by former Marikina mayor Del de Guzman of the Lakas–CMD. Tribal lawyer Annie Retes (Independent) also ran for vice mayor.

Candidate	Party	Votes	%
Del de Guzman	Lakas–CMD	125,573	50.86
Marion Andres (incumbent)	National Unity Party	118,038	47.81
Annie Retes	Independent	3,297	1.34
Total		246,908	100.00
Valid votes		246,908	95.53
Invalid/blank votes		11,558	4.47
Total votes		258,466	100.00
Registered voters/turnout		315,980	81.80
Lakas gain from NUP			
Source: Commission on Elections

=== City Council ===
The Marikina City Council is composed of 18 councilors, 16 of whom are elected.

The National Unity Party won 10 seats, gaining a majority in the city council.

Party	Votes	%	Seats	+/–
National Unity Party	819,371	47.93	10	New
Lakas–CMD	685,641	40.11	5	New
Makabayan	6,729	0.39	0	New
Independent	197,736	11.57	1	+1
Total	1,709,477	100.00	16	0
Total votes	258,466	–		
Registered voters/turnout	315,980	81.80		
Source: Commission on Elections

==== 1st district ====
Marikina's 1st councilor district consists of the same area as Marikina's 1st legislative district. Eight councilors are elected from this councilor district.

21 candidates were included in the ballot.

Candidate	Party	Votes	%
Kate de Guzman (incumbent)	National Unity Party	62,268	8.77
Ces Reyes	Lakas–CMD	56,990	8.03
Pat Sicat	National Unity Party	55,341	7.80
Sam Ferriol (incumbent)	Independent	49,811	7.02
Cloyd Casimiro (incumbent)	National Unity Party	48,115	6.78
Jojo Banzon (incumbent)	National Unity Party	46,673	6.57
Regina Marie Pioquinto	National Unity Party	43,113	6.07
Carl Africa (incumbent)	Lakas–CMD	40,745	5.74
Jasper So	Lakas–CMD	35,951	5.06
Hazel Golangco	National Unity Party	35,795	5.04
Rommel Acuña (incumbent)	Lakas–CMD	35,138	4.95
Roset Sarmiento	Independent	34,985	4.93
Adams Bernardino	National Unity Party	34,725	4.89
Medick Ferrer	Lakas–CMD	31,571	4.45
Bruce Fortuno	Lakas–CMD	30,970	4.36
VJ Sabiniano	Lakas–CMD	22,428	3.16
Tope Ilagan	Independent	16,504	2.32
Imee Mascariña	Independent	16,342	2.30
Rosie Aquino	Independent	5,194	0.73
Benedicto dela Cruz	Independent	3,711	0.52
Jahn Alejaga	Independent	3,585	0.50
Total		709,955	100.00
Total votes		107,054	–
Registered voters/turnout		127,290	84.10
Source: Commission on Elections

==== 2nd district ====
Marikina's 2nd councilor district consists of the same area as Marikina's 2nd legislative district. Eight councilors are elected from this councilor district.

32 candidates were included in the ballot.

Candidate	Party	Votes	%
Jaren Feliciano	National Unity Party	83,382	8.34
Angel Nuñez (incumbent)	National Unity Party	74,334	7.44
Zif Ancheta	Lakas–CMD	67,753	6.78
Ronnie Acuña (incumbent)	Lakas–CMD	64,328	6.44
Marife Dayao (incumbent)	National Unity Party	64,101	6.41
Elvis Tolentino (incumbent)	National Unity Party	63,440	6.35
Rene Magtubo (incumbent)	Lakas–CMD	59,854	5.99
Larry Punzalan (incumbent)	National Unity Party	59,768	5.98
Migz de Guzman	Lakas–CMD	58,975	5.90
Michael Mojica	National Unity Party	54,463	5.45
Riza Teope	Lakas–CMD	54,157	5.42
Ruben Reyes	National Unity Party	48,582	4.86
Indigo Valentin	Lakas–CMD	47,393	4.74
Letlet Makiramdam	National Unity Party	45,271	4.53
Vincent Calanoga	Lakas–CMD	42,775	4.28
Yuri Edullan	Lakas–CMD	36,613	3.66
Susan Romero	Independent	7,587	0.76
Jimsen Jison	Independent	7,345	0.73
Rene Mira	Makabayan	6,729	0.67
Jep Ordoñez	Independent	5,470	0.55
Greg Teves	Independent	5,201	0.52
Cris Vitangcol	Independent	5,043	0.50
Ram Haveria	Independent	4,120	0.41
Ed Gillera	Independent	4,026	0.40
Nico Shahin Moghaddam	Independent	3,927	0.39
Marvis Madrigal	Independent	3,829	0.38
Beny Madrigal	Independent	3,825	0.38
George Villanueva	Independent	3,682	0.37
Patricia Serenata	Independent	3,698	0.37
Josephine Sandiego	Independent	3,313	0.33
Dindo Rosales	Independent	3,284	0.33
Jenilyn Retes	Independent	3,254	0.33
Total		999,522	100.00
Total votes		151,412	–
Registered voters/turnout		188,690	80.24
Source: Commission on Elections

== Muntinlupa ==
=== Mayor ===
Incumbent Mayor Ruffy Biazon of One Muntinlupa won re-election for a second term unopposed.

Candidate	Party	Votes	%
Ruffy Biazon (incumbent)	One Muntinlupa	209,498	100.00
Total		209,498	100.00
Valid votes		209,498	83.57
Invalid/blank votes		41,174	16.43
Total votes		250,672	100.00
Registered voters/turnout		314,934	79.60
1Munti hold			
Source: Commission on Elections

=== Vice Mayor ===
Incumbent Vice Mayor Artemio Simundac of the Partido Federal ng Pilipinas ran for a third term. He was previously affiliated with One Muntinlupa.

Simundac was defeated by former city councilor Phanie Teves, who ran as an independent. Muntinlupa Liga ng mga Barangay president Allen Ampaya (One Muntinlupa) also ran for vice mayor.

Candidate	Party	Votes	%
Phanie Teves	Independent	127,079	52.84
Allen Ampaya	One Muntinlupa	88,435	36.77
Artemio Simundac (incumbent)	Partido Federal ng Pilipinas	25,003	10.40
Total		240,517	100.00
Valid votes		240,517	95.95
Invalid/blank votes		10,155	4.05
Total votes		250,672	100.00
Registered voters/turnout		314,934	79.60
Independent gain from PFP			
Source: Commission on Elections

=== City Council ===
The Muntinlupa City Council is composed of 18 councilors, 16 of whom are elected.

One Muntinlupa won 16 seats, maintaining its majority in the city council.

Party	Votes	%	Seats	+/–
One Muntinlupa	1,270,345	80.12	16	0
Partido Federal ng Pilipinas	162,521	10.25	0	New
Makabayan	14,861	0.94	0	New
Independent	137,846	8.69	0	0
Total	1,585,573	100.00	16	0
Total votes	250,672	–		
Registered voters/turnout	314,934	79.60		
Source: Commission on Elections

==== 1st district ====
Muntinlupa's 1st councilor district consists of the barangays of Bayanan, Poblacion, Putatan and Tunasan. Eight councilors are elected from this councilor district.

23 candidates were included in the ballot.

Candidate	Party	Votes	%
Alexson Diaz (incumbent)	One Muntinlupa	119,086	11.72
Raul Corro (incumbent)	One Muntinlupa	117,219	11.53
Rachel Arciaga (incumbent)	One Muntinlupa	115,378	11.35
Paty Katy Boncayao (incumbent)	One Muntinlupa	111,329	10.95
Jedi Presnedi (incumbent)	One Muntinlupa	95,235	9.37
Walter Arcilla	One Muntinlupa	89,305	8.79
Ting Niefes (incumbent)	One Muntinlupa	89,000	8.76
Amanda Camilon	One Muntinlupa	81,406	8.01
Thata Teves	Partido Federal ng Pilipinas	72,116	7.09
Santi Mariñas	Independent	45,863	4.51
Rolly Estupin	Independent	18,130	1.78
Eli Anaya	Makabayan	8,934	0.88
Oby Tensuan	Partido Federal ng Pilipinas	7,180	0.71
Myrna dela Concepcion	Makabayan	5,927	0.58
Rafael Burgos	Partido Federal ng Pilipinas	5,466	0.54
Eduardo Villarin	Partido Federal ng Pilipinas	5,316	0.52
Renato Santos	Independent	4,795	0.47
Ian dela Cruz	Partido Federal ng Pilipinas	4,757	0.47
Bongbong Virtudazo	Partido Federal ng Pilipinas	4,542	0.45
Rene Valencia	Independent	4,225	0.42
Ed Castalone	Partido Federal ng Pilipinas	4,223	0.42
Emmy Escriba	Partido Federal ng Pilipinas	4,143	0.41
Girome Silpao	Independent	2,889	0.28
Total		1,016,464	100.00
Total votes		157,188	–
Registered voters/turnout		197,371	79.64
Source: Commission on Elections

==== 2nd district ====
Muntinlupa's 2nd councilor district consists of the barangays of Alabang, Ayala Alabang, Buli, Cupang and Sucat. Eight councilors are elected from this councilor district.

17 candidates were included in the ballot.

Candidate	Party	Votes	%
Reggie Landrito	One Muntinlupa	61,464	10.80
Jun Metong Sevilla (incumbent)	One Muntinlupa	60,105	10.56
Kaye Anne Rongavilla	One Muntinlupa	57,343	10.08
Ryan Bagatsing (incumbent)	One Muntinlupa	56,451	9.92
Arlene Hilapo (incumbent)	One Muntinlupa	55,917	9.83
Sha Sha Baes	One Muntinlupa	55,826	9.81
Dado Moldez (incumbent)	One Muntinlupa	53,912	9.47
Cornelio Martinez (incumbent)	One Muntinlupa	51,369	9.03
Dhes Arevalo	Independent	50,784	8.92
Elmer Espeleta	Partido Federal ng Pilipinas	25,086	4.41
Bert Lizardo	Partido Federal ng Pilipinas	7,926	1.39
Amy Aquino	Partido Federal ng Pilipinas	7,550	1.33
Tony Mabini	Independent	6,290	1.11
Francia Samson	Partido Federal ng Pilipinas	5,196	0.91
Kenneth Macaylas	Partido Federal ng Pilipinas	4,953	0.87
Suma Pacoma	Independent	4,870	0.86
Lolito Pantaleon	Partido Federal ng Pilipinas	4,067	0.71
Total		569,109	100.00
Total votes		93,484	–
Registered voters/turnout		117,563	79.52
Source: Commission on Elections

== Navotas ==
=== Mayor ===
Incumbent Mayor John Rey Tiangco of Partido Navoteño won re-election for a second term unopposed.

Candidate	Party	Votes	%
John Rey Tiangco (incumbent)	Partido Navoteño	120,283	100.00
Total		120,283	100.00
Valid votes		120,283	93.05
Invalid/blank votes		8,991	6.95
Total votes		129,274	100.00
Registered voters/turnout		157,065	82.31
Navoteño hold			
Source: Commission on Elections

=== Vice Mayor ===
Incumbent Vice Mayor Tito Sanchez of Partido Navoteño won re-election for a second term unopposed.

Candidate	Party	Votes	%
Tito Sanchez (incumbent)	Partido Navoteño	110,981	100.00
Total		110,981	100.00
Valid votes		110,981	85.85
Invalid/blank votes		18,293	14.15
Total votes		129,274	100.00
Registered voters/turnout		157,065	82.31
Navoteño hold			
Source: Commission on Elections

=== City Council ===
The Navotas City Council is composed of 14 councilors, 12 of whom are elected.

The Partido Navoteño won 12 seats, maintaining its majority in the city council.

Party	Votes	%	Seats	+/–
Partido Navoteño	522,972	92.79	12	0
PDP–Laban	13,168	2.34	0	New
Independent	27,463	4.87	0	0
Total	563,603	100.00	12	0
Total votes	129,274	–		
Registered voters/turnout	157,065	82.31		
Source: Commission on Elections

==== 1st district ====
Navotas's 1st councilor district consists of the barangays of Bagumbayan North, Bagumbayan South, Bangculasi, Navotas East, Navotas West, NBBS Dagat-dagatan, NBBS Kaunlaran, NBBS Proper, North Bay Boulevard North, San Rafael Village and Sipac Almacen. Six councilors are elected from this councilor district.

Seven candidates were included in the ballot.

Candidate	Party	Votes	%
Rey Monroy (incumbent)	Partido Navoteño	47,281	17.45
Lance Santiago (incumbent)	Partido Navoteño	42,914	15.84
Mylene Sanchez	Partido Navoteño	41,018	15.14
Anna Nazal	Partido Navoteño	40,725	15.03
RV Vicencio (incumbent)	Partido Navoteño	39,911	14.73
Tarok Maño (incumbent)	Partido Navoteño	37,183	13.72
Dennis Iledan	Independent	21,890	8.08
Total		270,922	100.00
Total votes		62,770	–
Registered voters/turnout		77,977	80.50
Source: Commission on Elections

==== 2nd district ====
Navotas's 2nd councilor district consists of the barangays of Daanghari, San Jose, San Roque, Tangos North, Tangos South, Tanza 1 and Tanza 2. Six councilors are elected from this councilor district.

Eight candidates were included in the ballot.

Candidate	Party	Votes	%
Clint Geronimo (incumbent)	Partido Navoteño	51,188	17.49
Migi Naval (incumbent)	Partido Navoteño	49,162	16.80
Abu Gino-gino (incumbent)	Partido Navoteño	45,813	15.65
CJ Santos (incumbent)	Partido Navoteño	45,332	15.49
Liz Lupisan (incumbent)	Partido Navoteño	42,579	14.55
Rochelle Vicencio	Partido Navoteño	39,866	13.62
Richard Carlos	PDP–Laban	13,168	4.50
Lida Ibong	Independent	5,573	1.90
Total		292,681	100.00
Total votes		66,504	–
Registered voters/turnout		79,088	84.09
Source: Commission on Elections

== Parañaque ==
=== Mayor ===
Incumbent Mayor Eric Olivarez of Lakas–CMD ran for the House of Representatives in Parañaque's 1st legislative district. He was previously affiliated with the PDP–Laban.

Lakas–CMD nominated Olivarez' brother, representative Edwin Olivarez, who won the election against Drew Uy (Independent), Barangay Baclaran chairman Jun Zaide (Aksyon Demokratiko), his sister-in-law Aileen Olivarez (Independent) and three other candidates.

Candidate	Party	Votes	%
Edwin Olivarez	Lakas–CMD	142,561	53.69
Drew Uy	Independent	63,556	23.94
Jun Zaide	Aksyon Demokratiko	49,386	18.60
Aileen Olivarez	Independent	6,127	2.31
Nene Mendoza	Independent	2,204	0.83
Nathan Pineda	Workers' and Peasants' Party	964	0.36
Anabel Pantila	Independent	737	0.28
Total		265,535	100.00
Valid votes		265,535	95.40
Invalid/blank votes		12,806	4.60
Total votes		278,341	100.00
Registered voters/turnout		353,274	78.79
Lakas hold			
Source: Commission on Elections

=== Vice Mayor ===
Incumbent Vice Mayor Joan Villafuerte of Lakas–CMD ran for a second term. She was previously affiliated with the Liberal Party.

Villafuerte was defeated by former city councilor Benjo Bernabe of the Partido Federal ng Pilipinas.

Candidate	Party	Votes	%
Benjo Bernabe	Partido Federal ng Pilipinas	130,291	51.40
Joan Villafuerte (incumbent)	Lakas–CMD	123,193	48.60
Total		253,484	100.00
Valid votes		253,484	91.07
Invalid/blank votes		24,857	8.93
Total votes		278,341	100.00
Registered voters/turnout		353,274	78.79
PFP gain from Lakas			
Source: Commission on Elections

=== City Council ===
The Parañaque City Council is composed of 18 councilors, 16 of whom are elected.

Lakas–CMD won 11 seats, gaining a majority in the city council.

Party	Votes	%	Seats	+/–
Lakas–CMD	964,715	59.35	11	+10
Partido Federal ng Pilipinas	186,770	11.49	2	New
Nationalist People's Coalition	93,739	5.77	1	0
Kilusang Bagong Lipunan	10,403	0.64	0	0
PDP–Laban	6,574	0.40	0	–11
Independent	363,200	22.35	2	+1
Total	1,625,401	100.00	16	0
Total votes	278,341	–		
Registered voters/turnout	353,274	78.79		
Source: Commission on Elections

==== 1st district ====
Parañaque's 1st councilor district consists of the same area as Parañaque's 1st legislative district. Eight councilors are elected from this councilor district.

19 candidates were included in the ballot.

Candidate	Party	Votes	%
Raquel Gabriel	Independent	59,299	9.59
Paolo Olivarez (incumbent)	Lakas–CMD	58,614	9.48
Daniel Baes (incumbent)	Lakas–CMD	56,319	9.11
Allen Tan (incumbent)	Lakas–CMD	53,219	8.61
Yeoj Marquez	Lakas–CMD	47,743	7.73
Brillante Inciong (incumbent)	Lakas–CMD	47,617	7.70
Rina Gabriel	Lakas–CMD	45,639	7.38
Shannin Olivarez	Partido Federal ng Pilipinas	42,446	6.87
Guada Golez	Lakas–CMD	41,912	6.78
Tootz Vasquez	Independent	41,858	6.77
Joey delos Santos	Partido Federal ng Pilipinas	26,490	4.29
Maria Isabel Viduya	Lakas–CMD	25,213	4.08
Christian Eric Martinez	Independent	18,376	2.97
Smiling Santos	Independent	16,697	2.70
Ariel Fernandez	Independent	9,265	1.50
Boy Lagman	Independent	8,443	1.37
Tupe Rivera	Independent	7,300	1.18
Julius Disamburun	PDP–Laban	6,574	1.06
Ron Catunao	Partido Federal ng Pilipinas	5,006	0.81
Total		618,030	100.00
Total votes		105,462	–
Registered voters/turnout		139,653	75.52
Source: Commission on Elections

==== 2nd district ====
Parañaque's 2nd councilor district consists of the same area as Parañaque's 2nd legislative district. Eight councilors are elected from this councilor district.

16 candidates were included in the ballot.

Candidate	Party	Votes	%
Rico Golez (incumbent)	Lakas–CMD	120,222	11.93
Tess de Asis	Partido Federal ng Pilipinas	112,828	11.20
Binky Favis	Independent	104,712	10.39
Jet Frias (incumbent)	Lakas–CMD	103,389	10.26
Wahoo Sotto	Nationalist People's Coalition	93,739	9.31
Tin Esplana (incumbent)	Lakas–CMD	90,177	8.95
Shiella Benzon	Lakas–CMD	76,250	7.57
Ryan Yllana (incumbent)	Lakas–CMD	74,658	7.41
Beng Amurao (incumbent)	Lakas–CMD	74,300	7.38
Apiong dela Peña (incumbent)	Lakas–CMD	49,443	4.91
Nicolai Felix	Independent	25,543	2.54
Popoy Molina	Independent	22,616	2.25
Glenn Manio	Independent	18,210	1.81
Alamat Resuello	Independent	17,115	1.70
Gary Hachuela	Independent	13,766	1.37
Jepoy Peolino	Kilusang Bagong Lipunan	10,403	1.03
Total		1,007,371	100.00
Total votes		172,879	–
Registered voters/turnout		213,621	80.93
Source: Commission on Elections

== Pasay ==
=== Mayor ===
Incumbent Mayor Emi Rubiano of the Partido Federal ng Pilipinas ran for a third term. She was previously affiliated with the PDP–Laban.

Rubiano won re-election against city councilor Wowee Manguerra (Aksyon Demokratiko).

Candidate	Party	Votes	%
Emi Rubiano (incumbent)	Partido Federal ng Pilipinas	132,928	60.14
Wowee Manguerra	Aksyon Demokratiko	88,110	39.86
Total		221,038	100.00
Valid votes		221,038	96.88
Invalid/blank votes		7,112	3.12
Total votes		228,150	100.00
Registered voters/turnout		292,695	77.95
PFP hold			
Source: Commission on Elections

=== Vice Mayor ===
Incumbent Vice Mayor Ding del Rosario of Lakas–CMD ran for the Pasay City Council in the first district. She was previously affiliated with Laban ng Demokratikong Pilipino.

Lakas–CMD nominated city councilor Mark Calixto, who won the election against former city councilor Bong Tolentino (Independent).

Candidate	Party	Votes	%
Mark Calixto	Lakas–CMD	124,002	59.49
Bong Tolentino	Independent	84,446	40.51
Total		208,448	100.00
Valid votes		208,448	91.36
Invalid/blank votes		19,702	8.64
Total votes		228,150	100.00
Registered voters/turnout		292,695	77.95
Lakas hold			
Source: Commission on Elections

=== City Council ===
The Pasay City Council is composed of 14 councilors, 12 of whom are elected.

Lakas–CMD tied with Partido Federal ng Pilipinas at five seats each.

Party	Votes	%	Seats	+/–
Lakas–CMD	345,121	32.50	5	New
Partido Federal ng Pilipinas	309,443	29.14	5	+4
Tapat Kayong Pinaglilingkuran	126,515	11.91	2	New
PDP–Laban	77,973	7.34	0	–11
Aksyon Demokratiko	35,102	3.31	0	New
Liberal Party	19,454	1.83	0	New
Kilusang Bagong Lipunan	4,856	0.46	0	New
Independent	143,521	13.51	0	0
Total	1,061,985	100.00	12	0
Total votes	228,150	–		
Registered voters/turnout	292,695	77.95		
Source: Commission on Elections

==== 1st district ====
Pasay's 1st councilor district consists of Barangays 1 to 40, 68 to 92, 145 to 157, 183, and 187 to 201. Six councilors are elected from this councilor district.

14 candidates were included in the ballot.

Candidate	Party	Votes	%
Tonyo Cuneta	Lakas–CMD	67,139	12.44
Marlon Pesebre	Lakas–CMD	62,953	11.66
Grace Santos (incumbent)	Lakas–CMD	60,707	11.25
Ding del Rosario	Lakas–CMD	59,441	11.01
Ambet Alvina (incumbent)	Lakas–CMD	56,927	10.55
Jhaz Advincula	Partido Federal ng Pilipinas	47,827	8.86
Tino Claudio Santos	Independent	44,371	8.22
Puchet Santos	Lakas–CMD	37,954	7.03
Ronjay Advincula	Independent	37,509	6.95
Richard Anderson	Independent	29,214	5.41
Tiger Gabriel	PDP–Laban	14,074	2.61
Jocelyn Sato	PDP–Laban	10,094	1.87
Ace Calubayan	Independent	6,696	1.24
Ramon Santa Maria	Kilusang Bagong Lipunan	4,856	0.90
Total		539,762	100.00
Total votes		114,755	–
Registered voters/turnout		145,563	78.84
Source: Commission on Elections

==== 2nd district ====
Pasay's 2nd councilor district consists of Barangays 41 to 67, 93 to 144, 158 to 182, and 184 to 186. Six councilors are elected from this councilor district.

13 candidates were included in the ballot.

Candidate	Party	Votes	%
Khen Magat (incumbent)	Partido Federal ng Pilipinas	70,796	13.56
Yuyu del Rosario	Tapat Kayong Pinaglilingkuran	65,913	12.62
Allo Arceo (incumbent)	Partido Federal ng Pilipinas	65,084	12.46
Ian Vendivel	Partido Federal ng Pilipinas	63,008	12.07
Allan Panaligan	Partido Federal ng Pilipinas	62,728	12.01
Luigi Rubiano	Tapat Kayong Pinaglilingkuran	60,602	11.60
Jovita Baliao	PDP–Laban	35,949	6.88
Baby So	Aksyon Demokratiko	35,102	6.72
Ramon Yabut	Liberal Party	19,454	3.73
Hector Bongat	PDP–Laban	17,856	3.42
Danny Pantia	Independent	11,069	2.12
Manuel Jimenez	Independent	7,701	1.47
Ronelo Caducoy	Independent	6,961	1.33
Total		522,223	100.00
Total votes		113,395	–
Registered voters/turnout		147,132	77.07
Source: Commission on Elections

== Pasig ==
=== Mayor ===
Incumbent Mayor Vico Sotto ran for a third term as an independent. He was previously affiliated with Aksyon Demokratiko.

Sotto won re-election against Sarah Discaya (Unyon ng mga Gabay ng Bayan) and two other candidates.

Candidate	Party	Votes	%
Vico Sotto (incumbent)	Independent	351,392	92.09
Sarah Discaya	Unyon ng mga Gabay ng Bayan	29,591	7.75
Cory Palma	Independent	308	0.08
Eagle Ayaon	Independent	296	0.08
Total		381,587	100.00
Valid votes		381,587	98.84
Invalid/blank votes		4,470	1.16
Total votes		386,057	100.00
Registered voters/turnout		463,885	83.22
Independent hold			
Source: Commission on Elections

=== Vice Mayor ===
Incumbent Vice Mayor Robert Jaworski Jr. ran for a second term as an independent. He was previously affiliated with Aksyon Demokratiko.

Jaworski won re-election against former Pasig vice mayor Iyo Caruncho Bernardo (Independent) and Marc dela Cruz (Independent).

Candidate	Party	Votes	%
Robert Jaworski Jr. (incumbent)	Independent	290,237	78.84
Iyo Caruncho Bernardo	Independent	72,227	19.62
Marc dela Cruz	Independent	5,658	1.54
Total		368,122	100.00
Valid votes		368,122	95.35
Invalid/blank votes		17,935	4.65
Total votes		386,057	100.00
Registered voters/turnout		463,885	83.22
Independent hold			
Source: Commission on Elections

=== City Council ===
The Pasig City Council is composed of 14 councilors, 12 of whom are elected.

The Nationalist People's Coalition remained as the largest party in the city council with six seats, but lost its majority.

Party	Votes	%	Seats	+/–
Nationalist People's Coalition	621,939	32.50	6	–2
Nacionalista Party	209,279	10.94	0	–1
Pwersa ng Masang Pilipino	113,076	5.91	0	New
PDP–Laban	97,707	5.11	1	+1
Akay National Political Party	85,941	4.49	1	New
Akbayan	71,146	3.72	1	New
Lakas–CMD	50,066	2.62	0	New
Reform PH Party	11,317	0.59	0	New
Liberal Party	9,359	0.49	0	New
Independent	643,851	33.64	3	+3
Total	1,913,681	100.00	12	0
Total votes	386,057	–		
Registered voters/turnout	463,885	83.22		
Source: Commission on Elections

==== 1st district ====
Pasig's 1st councilor district is composed of the barangays of Bagong Ilog, Bagong Katipunan, Bambang, Buting, Caniogan, Kalawaan, Kapasigan, Kapitolyo, Malinao, Oranbo, Palatiw, Pineda, Sagad, San Antonio, San Joaquin, San Jose, San Nicolas, Santa Rosa, Santo Tomas, Sumilang and Ugong. Six councilors are elected from this councilor district.

15 candidates were included in the ballot.

Candidate	Party	Votes	%
Simon Romulo Tantoco (incumbent)	Nationalist People's Coalition	105,593	14.28
Kiko Rustia (incumbent)	Nationalist People's Coalition	101,607	13.74
Pao Santiago (incumbent)	Nationalist People's Coalition	89,666	12.12
Volta delos Santos (incumbent)	Akay National Political Party	85,941	11.62
Eric Gonzales (incumbent)	Nationalist People's Coalition	73,638	9.96
Paul Senogat	Akbayan	71,146	9.62
Shamcey Supsup-Lee	Independent	40,288	5.45
Rex Balderama	Nacionalista Party	35,792	4.84
Richie Pua	Pwersa ng Masang Pilipino	26,284	3.55
Jess Gaviola	Nacionalista Party	25,575	3.46
Ron Angeles	Pwersa ng Masang Pilipino	24,686	3.34
Tantan Reyes	Independent	21,407	2.89
JR Samson	Independent	17,265	2.33
JP Pascual	Reform PH Party	11,317	1.53
Ram Alan Cruz	Liberal Party	9,359	1.27
Total		739,564	100.00
Total votes		150,207	–
Registered voters/turnout		181,637	82.70
Source: Commission on Elections

==== 2nd district ====
Pasig's 2nd councilor district is composed of the barangays of Dela Paz, Manggahan, Maybunga, Pinagbuhatan, Rosario, San Miguel, Santa Lucia and Santolan. Six councilors are elected from this councilor district.

16 candidates were included in the ballot.

Candidate	Party	Votes	%
Angelu de Leon (incumbent)	Independent	174,041	14.82
Maro Martires (incumbent)	Independent	139,582	11.89
Buboy Agustin (incumbent)	Nationalist People's Coalition	129,313	11.01
Warren Inocencio	Independent	127,112	10.83
Boyie Raymundo	Nationalist People's Coalition	122,122	10.40
Ryan Enriquez	PDP–Laban	97,707	8.32
Syvel Asilo (incumbent)	Nacionalista Party	73,692	6.28
Junjun Concepcion	Pwersa ng Masang Pilipino	62,106	5.29
Kaye dela Cruz	Independent	57,344	4.88
Ara Mina	Lakas–CMD	50,066	4.26
Willy Sityar	Nacionalista Party	41,181	3.51
Steve de Asis	Nacionalista Party	33,039	2.81
Bobby Hapin	Independent	20,964	1.79
Ed Gavino	Independent	18,060	1.54
JRB Balingit	Independent	16,190	1.38
Mer Añon	Independent	11,598	0.99
Total		1,174,117	100.00
Total votes		235,850	–
Registered voters/turnout		282,248	83.56
Source: Commission on Elections

== Pateros ==
=== Mayor ===
Term-limited incumbent Mayor Ike Ponce of Aksyon Demokratiko ran for the House of Representatives as a nominee of the Ahon Mahirap party-list.

Ponce endorsed Pateros administrator Gerald German (Partido Federal ng Pilipinas), who won the election against city councilor RSM Miranda (National Unity Party). Dominador Rosales Jr. (Independent) was initially a candidate before withdrawing on October 11, 2024, and endorsing German.

Candidate	Party	Votes	%
Gerald German	Partido Federal ng Pilipinas	16,459	55.87
RSM Miranda	National Unity Party	13,001	44.13
Total		29,460	100.00
Valid votes		29,460	96.40
Invalid/blank votes		1,100	3.60
Total votes		30,560	100.00
Registered voters/turnout		37,830	80.78
PFP gain from Aksyon			
Source: Commission on Elections

=== Vice Mayor ===
Incumbent Vice Mayor Carlo Santos of the Nacionalista Party ran for a second term.

Santos won re-election against former Pateros Liga ng mga Barangay president Peter Marzan (National Unity Party) and John Cerafica (Partido Federal ng Pilipinas).

Candidate	Party	Votes	%
Carlo Santos (Incumbent)	Nacionalista Party	15,678	53.94
Peter Marzan	National Unity Party	9,393	32.32
John Cerafica	Partido Federal ng Pilipinas	3,992	13.74
Total		29,063	100.00
Valid votes		29,063	95.10
Invalid/blank votes		1,497	4.90
Total votes		30,560	100.00
Registered voters/turnout		37,830	80.78
Nacionalista hold			
Source: Commission on Elections

=== Municipal Council ===
The Pateros Municipal Council is composed of 14 councilors, 12 of whom are elected.

The Nacionalista Party won seven seats, gaining a majority in the municipal council.

Party	Votes	%	Seats	+/–
Partido Federal ng Pilipinas	46,248	31.34	3	+3
Nacionalista Party	42,263	28.64	7	+3
National Unity Party	37,442	25.37	1	New
Katipunan ng Nagkakaisang Pilipino	4,617	3.13	1	New
Independent	16,990	11.51	0	0
Total	147,560	100.00	12	0
Total votes	30,560	–		
Registered voters/turnout	37,830	80.78		
Source: Commission on Elections

==== 1st district ====
Pateros' 1st councilor district consists of the barangays of Martires del 96, San Roque and Santa Ana. Six councilors are elected from this councilor district.

25 candidates were included in the ballot.

Candidate	Party	Votes	%
Allan dela Cruz (incumbent)	Partido Federal ng Pilipinas	7,428	8.91
Don Ponce	Partido Federal ng Pilipinas	6,516	7.82
Jay Mabanglo (incumbent)	National Unity Party	6,108	7.33
Edwin Acosta	Partido Federal ng Pilipinas	6,032	7.24
Mil Villegas (incumbent)	Nacionalista Party	5,582	6.70
Ryan Panis	Nacionalista Party	4,988	5.98
Adonis Bigas	Independent	4,740	5.69
Eric Mabazza	Nacionalista Party	4,716	5.66
Hapon Abiño (incumbent)	National Unity Party	4,301	5.16
Jojo Nicdao	Independent	3,709	4.45
Nene Bermejo	Partido Federal ng Pilipinas	3,423	4.11
Monay Manzon	National Unity Party	3,204	3.84
Luigi Marcelo	Partido Federal ng Pilipinas	3,170	3.80
Ramir Ramirez	National Unity Party	3,109	3.73
Jonjon Ongmanchi	Partido Federal ng Pilipinas	3,020	3.62
Fernando Datu	National Unity Party	2,824	3.39
Ruel Gatpayat	Partido Federal ng Pilipinas	2,696	3.23
Lando Dolon	Independent	2,584	3.10
Cesar Llagas	Independent	1,289	1.55
Moner Luna	National Unity Party	1,196	1.43
Alfie Apan	Independent	1,010	1.21
Romy Quiñones	Independent	652	0.78
Aldy Reyes	Independent	410	0.49
Dante Legaspi	Independent	369	0.44
Jun Cerada	Independent	276	0.33
Total		83,352	100.00
Total votes		17,361	–
Registered voters/turnout		21,540	80.60
Source: Commission on Elections

==== 2nd district ====
Pateros' 2nd councilor district consists of the barangays of Aguho, Magtanggol, Poblacion, San Pedro, Santo Rosario-Kanluran, Santo Rosario-Silangan and Tabacalera. Six councilors are elected from this councilor district.

18 candidates were included in the ballot.

Candidate	Party	Votes	%
Atoy Cortez	Nacionalista Party	6,081	9.47
Omar Alcantara	Nacionalista Party	5,724	8.91
Alden Mangoba (incumbent)	Nacionalista Party	5,625	8.76
Emman Tañga	Nacionalista Party	4,852	7.56
Jojo Sanchez	Nacionalista Party	4,695	7.31
Paul Cruz	Katipunan ng Nagkakaisang Pilipino	4,617	7.19
Rommel Lambino	National Unity Party	4,461	6.95
Ayie Ampe (Incumbent)	Partido Federal ng Pilipinas	4,268	6.65
Richard Palican	National Unity Party	3,795	5.91
Ian Ponce	Partido Federal ng Pilipinas	3,086	4.81
Jun Ling	National Unity Party	2,708	4.22
Joey De Lara	National Unity Party	2,607	4.06
Jonell Raymundo	Partido Federal ng Pilipinas	2,387	3.72
Teng Joson	Partido Federal ng Pilipinas	2,338	3.64
Marvin Ponce	Independent	1,951	3.04
Ryan Millares	Partido Federal ng Pilipinas	1,884	2.93
Roderick Roxas	National Unity Party	1,884	2.93
Chito Lorenzo	National Unity Party	1,245	1.94
Total		64,208	100.00
Total votes		13,199	–
Registered voters/turnout		16,290	81.03
Source: Commission on Elections

== Quezon City ==
=== Mayor ===
Incumbent Mayor Joy Belmonte of the Serbisyo sa Bayan Party ran for a third term.

Belmonte won re-election against four other candidates.

Candidate	Party	Votes	%
Joy Belmonte (incumbent)	Serbisyo sa Bayan Party	1,030,730	95.56
Diosdado Velasco	Independent	21,195	1.97
Jonathan Cabalo	Independent	13,809	1.28
Rolando Jota	Independent	8,586	0.80
Noli Navat	Independent	4,253	0.39
Total		1,078,573	100.00
Valid votes		1,078,573	93.74
Invalid/blank votes		72,013	6.26
Total votes		1,150,586	100.00
Registered voters/turnout		1,454,411	79.11
SBP hold			
Source: Commission on Elections

=== Vice Mayor ===
Incumbent Vice Mayor Gian Sotto of the Serbisyo sa Bayan Party ran for a third term.

Sotto won re-election against three other candidates.

Candidate	Party	Votes	%
Gian Sotto (incumbent)	Serbisyo sa Bayan Party	938,686	93.48
Dante Villarta	Independent	27,077	2.70
Jose Ingles	Independent	19,821	1.97
June Faelangco	Independent	18,598	1.85
Total		1,004,182	100.00
Valid votes		1,004,182	87.28
Invalid/blank votes		146,404	12.72
Total votes		1,150,586	100.00
Registered voters/turnout		1,454,411	79.11
SBP hold			
Source: Commission on Elections

=== City Council ===
The Quezon City Council is composed of 38 councilors, 36 of whom are elected.

The Serbisyo sa Bayan Party won 28 seats, maintaining its majority in the city council.

Party	Votes	%	Seats	+/–
Serbisyo sa Bayan Party	3,836,122	72.61	28	+3
Lakas–CMD	283,072	5.36	3	–2
Aksyon Demokratiko	133,048	2.52	1	+1
Partido Federal ng Pilipinas	91,753	1.74	1	+1
Nacionalista Party	77,201	1.46	1	–2
Nationalist People's Coalition	65,350	1.24	0	–1
Akay National Political Party	54,617	1.03	0	New
Makabayan	11,243	0.21	0	New
Independent	731,078	13.84	2	+2
Total	5,283,484	100.00	36	0
Total votes	1,150,586	–		
Registered voters/turnout	1,454,411	79.11		
Source: Commission on Elections

==== 1st district ====
Quezon City's 1st councilor district consists of the same area as Quezon City's 1st legislative district. Six councilors are elected from this councilor district.

12 candidates were included in the ballot.

Candidate	Party	Votes	%
TJ Calalay (incumbent)	Serbisyo sa Bayan Party	111,194	14.33
Bernard Herrera (incumbent)	Serbisyo sa Bayan Party	108,265	13.95
Doray Delarmente (incumbent)	Serbisyo sa Bayan Party	108,159	13.94
Sep Juico (incumbent)	Serbisyo sa Bayan Party	98,036	12.63
Charm Ferrer (incumbent)	Serbisyo sa Bayan Party	90,727	11.69
Nikki Crisologo (incumbent)	Partido Federal ng Pilipinas	83,257	10.73
Gab Atayde	Serbisyo sa Bayan Party	81,261	10.47
Doland Castro	Akay National Political Party	54,617	7.04
Casa Honasan	Independent	13,755	1.77
Roland Manansala	Independent	9,173	1.18
Melodino Villanueva	Independent	8,832	1.14
Benjamin Aromin Jr.	Independent	8,749	1.13
Total		776,025	100.00
Total votes		168,049	–
Registered voters/turnout		217,676	77.20
Source: Commission on Elections

==== 2nd district ====
Quezon City's 2nd councilor district consists of the same area as Quezon City's 2nd legislative district. Six councilors are elected from this councilor district.

11 candidates were included in the ballot.

Candidate	Party	Votes	%
Mikey Belmonte (incumbent)	Serbisyo sa Bayan Party	198,502	16.74
Candy Medina (incumbent)	Serbisyo sa Bayan Party	190,790	16.09
Bong Liban (incumbent)	Serbisyo sa Bayan Party	184,273	15.54
Aly Medalla (incumbent)	Serbisyo sa Bayan Party	179,818	15.17
Dave Valmocina (incumbent)	Serbisyo sa Bayan Party	172,663	14.56
Rannie Ludovica (incumbent)	Serbisyo sa Bayan Party	151,307	12.76
Nido Perez	Independent	26,943	2.27
Manuel Tenorio	Independent	26,110	2.20
Noel Navat	Independent	20,584	1.74
Josie Fresnillo	Independent	18,316	1.55
Leonardo Taoingan	Independent	16,193	1.37
Total		1,185,499	100.00
Total votes		257,836	–
Registered voters/turnout		328,316	78.53
Source: Commission on Elections

==== 3rd district ====
Quezon City's 3rd councilor district consists of the same area as Quezon City's 3rd legislative district. Six councilors are elected from this councilor district.

10 candidates were included in the ballot.

Candidate	Party	Votes	%
Geleen Lumbad (incumbent)	Serbisyo sa Bayan Party	93,422	14.75
Tope Liquigan	Independent	82,857	13.08
Chuckie Antonio (incumbent)	Serbisyo sa Bayan Party	78,409	12.38
Wency Lagumbay (incumbent)	Nacionalista Party	77,201	12.19
Don de Leon (incumbent)	Serbisyo sa Bayan Party	75,672	11.94
Luigi Pumaren	Serbisyo sa Bayan Party	72,733	11.48
Julian Coseteng	Serbisyo sa Bayan Party	71,457	11.28
Anton Reyes (incumbent)	Nationalist People's Coalition	65,350	10.32
Pau Planas	Partido Federal ng Pilipinas	8,496	1.34
Norma Rufo	Independent	7,942	1.25
Total		633,539	100.00
Total votes		139,339	–
Registered voters/turnout		172,497	80.78
Source: Commission on Elections

==== 4th district ====
Quezon City's 4th councilor district consists of the same area as Quezon City's 4th legislative district. Six councilors are elected from this councilor district.

15 candidates were included in the ballot.

Candidate	Party	Votes	%
Vincent Belmonte	Serbisyo sa Bayan Party	125,388	13.96
Egay Yap (incumbent)	Serbisyo sa Bayan Party	111,887	12.46
Nanette Daza (incumbent)	Lakas–CMD	101,988	11.36
Imee Rillo (incumbent)	Lakas–CMD	96,062	10.70
Migs Suntay	Independent	94,426	10.51
Raquel Malañgen (incumbent)	Lakas–CMD	85,022	9.47
Kiko del Mundo	Independent	83,712	9.32
Ivy Lim	Serbisyo sa Bayan Party	79,653	8.87
Ali Forbes	Independent	48,523	5.40
Bayani Hipol	Independent	29,876	3.33
Lorevie Caalaman	Makabayan	11,243	1.25
Awin Aquino	Independent	9,697	1.08
James Ibañez	Independent	8,219	0.92
Nestor Andal	Independent	7,902	0.88
Flocerfida Sernias	Independent	4,531	0.50
Total		898,129	100.00
Total votes		193,458	–
Registered voters/turnout		234,450	82.52
Source: Commission on Elections

==== 5th district ====
Quezon City's 5th councilor district consists of the same area as Quezon City's 5th legislative district. Six councilors are elected from this councilor district.

11 candidates were included in the ballot.

Candidate	Party	Votes	%
Joseph Visaya (incumbent)	Serbisyo sa Bayan Party	157,534	15.17
Aiko Melendez (incumbent)	Serbisyo sa Bayan Party	144,700	13.93
Alfred Vargas (incumbent)	Serbisyo sa Bayan Party	135,104	13.01
Karl Castelo	Aksyon Demokratiko	133,048	12.81
Shay Liban (incumbent)	Serbisyo sa Bayan Party	124,572	12.00
Ram Medalla (incumbent)	Serbisyo sa Bayan Party	120,696	11.62
Enzo Pineda	Serbisyo sa Bayan Party	102,722	9.89
Jonel Quebal	Independent	81,930	7.89
Angel Ortigas	Independent	17,755	1.71
Arpee Sabe	Independent	10,799	1.04
Johnny Gadong	Independent	9,619	0.93
Total		1,038,479	100.00
Total votes		221,705	–
Registered voters/turnout		281,197	78.84
Source: Commission on Elections

==== 6th district ====
Quezon City's 6th councilor district consists of the same area as Quezon City's 6th legislative district. Six councilors are elected from this councilor district.

Nine candidates were included in the ballot.

Candidate	Party	Votes	%
Ellie Juan (incumbent)	Serbisyo sa Bayan Party	120,687	16.05
Banjo Pilar (incumbent)	Serbisyo sa Bayan Party	119,831	15.94
Kristine Matias (incumbent)	Serbisyo sa Bayan Party	118,362	15.74
Vic Bernardo (incumbent)	Serbisyo sa Bayan Party	107,295	14.27
Vito Sotto Generoso (incumbent)	Serbisyo sa Bayan Party	106,186	14.12
Cocoy Medina	Serbisyo sa Bayan Party	94,817	12.61
Louie Saludes	Independent	49,166	6.54
Helen Francisco	Independent	20,094	2.67
Oscar Gomez Jr.	Independent	15,375	2.05
Total		751,813	100.00
Total votes		170,199	–
Registered voters/turnout		220,275	77.27
Source: Commission on Elections

== San Juan ==
=== Mayor ===
Incumbent Mayor Francis Zamora of the Partido Federal ng Pilipinas ran for a third term. He was previously affiliated with the PDP–Laban.

Zamora won re-election against former San Juan vice mayor Philip Cezar (Pwersa ng Masang Pilipino).

Candidate	Party	Votes	%
Francis Zamora (incumbent)	Partido Federal ng Pilipinas	57,998	87.43
Philip Cezar	Pwersa ng Masang Pilipino	8,340	12.57
Total		66,338	100.00
Valid votes		66,338	93.69
Invalid/blank votes		4,471	6.31
Total votes		70,809	100.00
Registered voters/turnout		100,639	70.36
PFP hold			
Source: Commission on Elections

=== Vice Mayor ===
Incumbent Vice Mayor Angelo Agcaoili (Partido Federal ng Pilipinas) is running for a full term. Previously affiliated with the PDP–Laban, he became vice mayor on June 26, 2023, after Warren Villa died.

Agcaolili won the election against Candy Crisologo (Independent).

Candidate	Party	Votes	%
Angelo Agcaoili (incumbent)	Partido Federal ng Pilipinas	48,600	77.45
Candy Crisologo	Independent	14,147	22.55
Total		62,747	100.00
Valid votes		62,747	88.61
Invalid/blank votes		8,062	11.39
Total votes		70,809	100.00
Registered voters/turnout		100,639	70.36
PFP hold			
Source: Commission on Elections

=== City Council ===
The San Juan City Council is composed of 14 councilors, 12 of whom are elected.

The Partido Federal ng Pilipinas won 11 seats, gaining a majority in the city council.

Party	Votes	%	Seats	+/–
Partido Federal ng Pilipinas	241,465	76.44	11	New
Pwersa ng Masang Pilipino	63,212	20.01	1	+1
Independent	11,195	3.54	0	0
Total	315,872	100.00	12	0
Total votes	70,809	–		
Registered voters/turnout	100,639	70.36		
Source: Commission on Elections

==== 1st district ====
San Juan's 1st councilor district consists of the barangays of Balong-Bato, Batis, Corazon de Jesus, Ermitaño, Pasadeña, Pedro Cruz, Progreso, Rivera, Salapan and San Perfecto. Six councilors are elected from this councilor district.

Ten candidates were included in the ballot.

Candidate	Party	Votes	%
Ryan Llanos Dee (incumbent)	Partido Federal ng Pilipinas	19,627	12.48
James Yap (incumbent)	Partido Federal ng Pilipinas	18,394	11.70
Boyet Tolentino	Partido Federal ng Pilipinas	17,936	11.41
Ervic Vijandre (incumbent)	Partido Federal ng Pilipinas	17,372	11.05
Dennis Pardinez	Partido Federal ng Pilipinas	17,337	11.03
Vic Reyes	Pwersa ng Masang Pilipino	16,359	10.41
Renren Ritualo	Partido Federal ng Pilipinas	13,539	8.61
Chesco Velasco	Pwersa ng Masang Pilipino	13,326	8.48
Triccia Dacer	Pwersa ng Masang Pilipino	12,339	7.85
Anton Santiago	Pwersa ng Masang Pilipino	10,985	6.99
Total		157,214	100.00
Total votes		34,185	–
Registered voters/turnout		47,987	71.24
Source: Commission on Elections

==== 2nd district ====
San Juan's 2nd councilor district consists of the barangays of Addition Hills, Greenhills, Isabelita, Kabayanan, Litte Baguio, Maytunas, Onse, Saint Joseph, Santa Lucia, Tibagan and West Crame. Six councilors are elected from this councilor district.

Nine candidates were included in the ballot.

Candidate	Party	Votes	%
Franco Tañada-Yam (incumbent)	Partido Federal ng Pilipinas	24,659	15.54
Kit Peralta (incumbent)	Partido Federal ng Pilipinas	24,461	15.42
Bea de Guzman (incumbent)	Partido Federal ng Pilipinas	23,754	14.97
Totoy Bernardo (incumbent)	Partido Federal ng Pilipinas	22,932	14.45
Macky Mathay (incumbent)	Partido Federal ng Pilipinas	22,694	14.30
Don Allado (incumbent)	Partido Federal ng Pilipinas	18,760	11.82
Earvin John Villasper	Pwersa ng Masang Pilipino	10,203	6.43
Marvin dela Cruz	Independent	5,940	3.74
Juanito Violeta III	Independent	5,255	3.31
Total		158,658	100.00
Total votes		36,624	–
Registered voters/turnout		52,652	69.56
Source: Commission on Elections

== Taguig ==
=== Mayor ===
Incumbent Mayor Lani Cayetano of the Nacionalista Party ran for a second term.

Cayetano won re-election against former representative Arnel Cerafica (Partido Federal ng Pilipinas) and Brigido Licudine (Independent).

Candidate	Party	Votes	%
Lani Cayetano (incumbent)	Nacionalista Party	410,706	78.92
Arnel Cerafica	Partido Federal ng Pilipinas	103,334	19.86
Brigido Licudine	Independent	6,394	1.23
Total		520,434	100.00
Valid votes		520,434	96.90
Invalid/blank votes		16,659	3.10
Total votes		537,093	100.00
Registered voters/turnout		680,554	78.92
Nacionalista hold			
Source: Commission on Elections

=== Vice Mayor ===
Incumbent Vice Mayor Arvin Alit of the Nacionalista Party ran for a second term.

Alit won re-election against Janelle Cerafica (Partido Federal ng Pilipinas) and Nelly Tanglao (Independent).

Candidate	Party	Votes	%
Arvin Ian Alit (incumbent)	Nacionalista Party	337,360	69.29
Janelle Cerafica	Partido Federal ng Pilipinas	133,855	27.49
Nelly Tanglao	Independent	15,657	3.22
Total		486,872	100.00
Valid votes		486,872	90.65
Invalid/blank votes		50,221	9.35
Total votes		537,093	100.00
Registered voters/turnout		680,554	78.92
Nacionalista hold			
Source: Commission on Elections

=== City Council ===
Since Taguig's redistricting in 2024, the Taguig City Council is composed of 26 councilors, 24 of whom are elected.

The Nacionalista Party won 24 seats, maintaining its majority in the city council.

Party	Votes	%	Seats	+/–
Nacionalista Party	3,171,095	68.74	24	+8
Partido Federal ng Pilipinas	883,949	19.16	0	New
Makabayan	25,436	0.55	0	New
Partido Lakas ng Masa	16,482	0.36	0	0
Independent	516,369	11.19	0	0
Total	4,613,331	100.00	24	+8
Total votes	537,093	–		
Registered voters/turnout	680,554	78.92		
Source: Commission on Elections

==== 1st district ====
Taguig's 1st councilor district consists of the barangays of Taguig in Taguig–Pateros's lone legislative district. The councilor district was expanded in 2024, to include the barangays of Comembo, Pembo and Rizal from Makati. Twelve councilors are elected from this councilor district.

31 candidates were included in the ballot.

Candidate	Party	Votes	%
Darwin Icay	Nacionalista Party	146,059	6.81
Allan Paul Cruz	Nacionalista Party	140,415	6.55
Jimmy Labampa (incumbent)	Nacionalista Party	136,631	6.37
Sammy Cruz	Nacionalista Party	135,293	6.31
Joy Panga-Cruz (incumbent)	Nacionalista Party	130,231	6.07
Tikboy Marcelino (incumbent)	Nacionalista Party	122,699	5.72
Gamie San Pedro (incumbent)	Nacionalista Party	121,457	5.66
Kim Manzo Abbang	Nacionalista Party	121,298	5.66
Carlito Ogalinola (incumbent)	Nacionalista Party	116,729	5.44
Raul Aquino (incumbent)	Nacionalista Party	115,607	5.39
Ferdie Santos	Nacionalista Party	114,261	5.33
Totong Mañosca (incumbent)	Nacionalista Party	103,358	4.82
Jannah Cruz	Partido Federal ng Pilipinas	59,540	2.78
Paul Lontoc	Independent	48,771	2.27
Mark Bryan Beran	Independent	44,822	2.09
Jonjon Bautista	Partido Federal ng Pilipinas	41,533	1.94
Mark Bacsain	Partido Federal ng Pilipinas	40,017	1.87
Warren delos Santos	Partido Federal ng Pilipinas	37,866	1.77
Rico Palma	Independent	37,063	1.73
Maria Ana Santos	Partido Federal ng Pilipinas	36,087	1.68
Elvie Madrid	Partido Federal ng Pilipinas	34,017	1.59
RJ Bernal	Partido Federal ng Pilipinas	32,946	1.54
Mogs Gonzales	Partido Federal ng Pilipinas	30,999	1.45
Joshua Sanga	Partido Federal ng Pilipinas	30,913	1.44
Tan-Tan Inan	Partido Federal ng Pilipinas	28,801	1.34
Henry Vera	Independent	28,471	1.33
Romeo Edgar Abaigar	Independent	26,691	1.24
Jing delos Santos	Makabayan	25,436	1.19
Gerard Sumagpao	Partido Federal ng Pilipinas	24,139	1.13
Reinante dela Paz	Independent	16,834	0.78
Johnny Alvarida	Independent	15,771	0.74
Total		2,144,755	100.00
Total votes		247,124	–
Registered voters/turnout		307,232	80.44
Source: Commission on Elections

==== 2nd district ====
Taguig's 2nd councilor district consists of the same area as Taguig's lone legislative district. The councilor district was expanded in 2024, to include the barangays of Cembo, East Rembo, Pitogo, Post Proper Northside, Post Proper Southside, South Cembo and West Rembo from Makati. Twelve councilors are elected from this councilor district.

37 candidates were included in the ballot.

Candidate	Party	Votes	%
Gigi Bermas	Nacionalista Party	153,345	6.21
Nicky Supan (incumbent)	Nacionalista Party	152,644	6.18
Ivie Dizon	Nacionalista Party	147,600	5.98
Danny Castro	Nacionalista Party	144,531	5.85
Jomil Serna (incumbent)	Nacionalista Party	138,933	5.63
Alex Penolio (incumbent)	Nacionalista Party	137,447	5.57
Bing Villamor	Nacionalista Party	136,530	5.53
Gen Pau-Tin	Nacionalista Party	135,542	5.49
Ed Prado (incumbent)	Nacionalista Party	135,149	5.47
Edgar Baptista (incumbent)	Nacionalista Party	129,420	5.24
Iony de Lara-Bes	Nacionalista Party	128,061	5.19
Marisse Balina-Eron (incumbent)	Nacionalista Party	127,855	5.18
Gary Lester Valdez	Partido Federal ng Pilipinas	48,308	1.96
Salvador Zamora III	Independent	47,846	1.94
Joel Advincula	Partido Federal ng Pilipinas	46,821	1.90
Benny Abatay	Partido Federal ng Pilipinas	44,854	1.82
Basilio Pooten	Partido Federal ng Pilipinas	44,467	1.80
Dudong San Pedro	Independent	41,305	1.67
Arthur Flores	Partido Federal ng Pilipinas	40,860	1.66
Lot Bandejas-Dilla	Partido Federal ng Pilipinas	40,802	1.65
Angie Bombase	Partido Federal ng Pilipinas	40,083	1.62
Jun Rivera	Partido Federal ng Pilipinas	39,863	1.61
Glenn Sacay	Partido Federal ng Pilipinas	38,838	1.57
Jude Acepcion	Partido Federal ng Pilipinas	35,180	1.43
Arman Ercillo	Partido Federal ng Pilipinas	34,135	1.38
Paolo Cabrera	Independent	33,435	1.35
Lani Calvadores	Partido Federal ng Pilipinas	32,880	1.33
Cosme de Asis	Independent	28,946	1.17
Sonny Daria	Independent	23,396	0.95
Ram Aggalut	Independent	21,392	0.87
Arthur Clavo	Independent	21,319	0.86
Abraham Anunciacion	Independent	17,990	0.73
Sid Capurcos	Independent	17,068	0.69
Jerry Tan	Partido Lakas ng Masa	16,482	0.67
Perlisita Magallano	Independent	16,477	0.67
Caleb Tibio	Independent	14,841	0.60
Cupid Demafiles	Independent	13,931	0.56
Total		2,468,576	100.00
Total votes		289,969	–
Registered voters/turnout		373,322	77.67
Source: Commission on Elections

== Valenzuela ==
=== Mayor ===
Incumbent Mayor Wes Gatchalian of the Nationalist People's Coalition won re-election for a second term unopposed.

Candidate	Party	Votes	%
Wes Gatchalian (incumbent)	Nationalist People's Coalition	295,876	100.00
Total		295,876	100.00
Valid votes		295,876	83.60
Invalid/blank votes		58,061	16.40
Total votes		353,937	100.00
Registered voters/turnout		438,556	80.71
NPC hold			
Source: Commission on Elections

=== Vice Mayor ===
Term-limited incumbent Vice Mayor Lorie Natividad-Borja of the Nationalist People's Coalition (NPC) ran for the Valenzuela City Council in the 2nd councilor district.

The NPC nominated city councilor Marlon Alejandrino, who won the election against Gilbert Gamas (Independent).

Candidate	Party	Votes	%
Marlon Alejandrino	Nationalist People's Coalition	244,708	81.67
Gilbert Gamas	Independent	54,931	18.33
Total		299,639	100.00
Valid votes		299,639	84.66
Invalid/blank votes		54,298	15.34
Total votes		353,937	100.00
Registered voters/turnout		438,556	80.71
NPC hold			
Source: Commission on Elections

=== City Council ===
The Valenzuela City Council is composed of 14 councilors, 12 of whom are elected.

The Nationalist People's Coalition won 10 seats, maintaining its majority in the city council.

Party	Votes	%	Seats	+/–
Nationalist People's Coalition	1,080,866	76.04	10	0
National Unity Party	109,719	7.72	1	New
Lakas–CMD	97,119	6.83	1	0
Aksyon Demokratiko	27,283	1.92	0	New
Makabayan	26,325	1.85	0	New
Democratic Party of the Philippines	17,422	1.23	0	New
Independent	62,651	4.41	0	0
Total	1,421,385	100.00	12	0
Total votes	353,937	–		
Registered voters/turnout	438,556	80.71		
Source: Commission on Elections

==== 1st district ====
Valenzuela's 1st councilor district consists of the same area as Valenzuela's 1st legislative district. Six councilors are elected from this councilor district.

Six candidates were included in the ballot.

Candidate	Party	Votes	%
Cris Feliciano (incumbent)	National Unity Party	109,719	19.07
Ghogo Lee (incumbent)	Nationalist People's Coalition	99,735	17.33
Richard Enriquez	Lakas–CMD	97,119	16.88
Bimbo dela Cruz (incumbent)	Nationalist People's Coalition	97,089	16.87
Kisha Ancheta	Nationalist People's Coalition	87,436	15.19
Goyong Serrano	Nationalist People's Coalition	84,395	14.66
Total		575,493	100.00
Total votes		171,409	–
Registered voters/turnout		210,330	81.50
Source: Commission on Elections

==== 2nd district ====
Valenzuela's 2nd councilor district consists of the same area as Valenzuela's 2nd legislative district. Six councilors are elected from this councilor district.

11 candidates were included in the ballot.

Candidate	Party	Votes	%
Lorie Natividad-Borja	Nationalist People's Coalition	134,245	15.87
Niña Lopez (incumbent)	Nationalist People's Coalition	122,571	14.49
Sel Sabino-Sy (incumbent)	Nationalist People's Coalition	117,693	13.91
Chiqui Carreon (incumbent)	Nationalist People's Coalition	113,943	13.47
Mickey Pineda (incumbent)	Nationalist People's Coalition	112,955	13.35
Louie Nolasco (incumbent)	Nationalist People's Coalition	110,804	13.10
Marvin Canengneng	Independent	43,425	5.13
JV Barcelona	Aksyon Demokratiko	27,283	3.23
Leticia Castillo	Makabayan	26,325	3.11
Danilo Cueto	Independent	19,226	2.27
Rommel Ortega	Democratic Party of the Philippines	17,422	2.06
Total		845,892	100.00
Total votes		182,528	–
Registered voters/turnout		228,226	79.98
Source: Commission on Elections
