= 2010 Parañaque local elections =

Philippine election

2010 Parañaque mayoral election
- May 10, 2010
Nominee	Florencio "Jun" Bernabe Jr.	Eduardo "Ed" Zialcita	Joselito "Joey" Marquez
Party	Lakas	Nacionalista	Independent
Running mate	Gustavo "Gus" Tambunting	Andres Jose "Anjo" Yllana (PMP)
Popular vote	87,127	70,372	39,459
Percentage	44.24%	35.73%	20.03%
Mayor before election
Florencio Bernabe Jr.
Lakas
Elected mayor
Florencio Bernabe Jr.
Lakas

Local elections were held in Parañaque City on May 10, 2010 within the Philippine general election. The voters elected for the elective local posts in the city: the mayor, vice mayor, the congressman, and the councilors, eight of them in the two districts of the city.

== Background ==
Mayor Florencio "Jun" Bernabe Jr. ran for re-election for third and final term. He was challenged by former Mayor Joselito "Joey" Marquez and Rep. Eduardo "Ed" Zialcita.

Vice Mayor Gustavo "Gus" Tambunting ran for re-election. He was challenged by former Vice Mayor Andres Jose "Anjo" Yllana for the second time.

First District Rep. Eduardo "Ed" Zialcita was term-limited, and he ran for mayor. His place was contested by former Laguna Vice Governor Edwin Olivarez, son of former Mayor Pablo Olivarez; Rolando Bernabe, brother of Mayor Florencio "Jun" Bernabe Jr., Epimaco "Junjun" Densing III, Edison "Ed"Javier, Fortunata "Naty" Magsombol, and Delfin "Ding" Wenceslao Jr.

Second District Rep. Roilo Golez ran for third and final term. He was challenged by Pedro "Pete" Montano.

== Results ==
Names written in bold-Italic were the re-elected incumbents while in italic were incumbents lost in elections.

=== For District Representative ===
==== First District ====
Former Laguna Vice Governor Edwin Olivarez defeated Rolando Bernabe.

Congressional Elections for Parañaque's First District
Party	Candidate	Votes	%
**Liberal**	**Edwin Olivarez**	**43,005**	**53.30**
Lakas–Kampi	Rolando Bernabe	25,295	31.35
KKK	Delfin Wenceslao, Jr.	6,813	8.44
NPC	Epimaco "Junjun" Densing III	2,897	3.59
Independent	Edison Javier	2,581	3.20
Independent	Fortunata "Naty" Magsombol	101	0.13
Valid ballots		80,692	92.67
Invalid or blank votes		6,381	7.33
Total votes		**87,073**	**100.00**
Liberal **gain** from Nacionalista			

==== Second District ====
Rep. Roilo Golez won the election.

Congressional Elections for Parañaque's Second District
Party	Candidate	Votes	%
**Liberal**	**Roilo Golez**	**98,940**	**95.99**
PMP	Pedro Cartajena Montaño	4,135	4.01
Valid ballots		103,075	87.88
Invalid or blank votes		14,209	12.12
Total votes		**117,284**	**100.00**
Liberal **hold**			

=== For Mayor ===
Mayor Florencio "Jun" Bernabe Jr. won in a tight election between Former Mayor Joselito "Joey" Marquez and First District Rep. Eduardo "Ed" Zialcita.

Parañaque Mayoralty Election
Party	Candidate	Votes	%
**Lakas**	**Florencio "Jun" Bernabe Jr.**	**87,127**	**44.24**
Nacionalista	Eduardo "Ed" Zialcita	70,372	35.73
Independent	Joselito "Joey" Marquez	39,459	20.03
Total votes		**196,958**	**100.00%**
Lakas **hold**			

=== For Vice Mayor ===
Vice Mayor Gustavo "Gus" Tambunting defeated Former Vice Mayor Andres Jose "Anjo" Yllana for the second time.

Parañaque Vice Mayoralty Elections
Party	Candidate	Votes	%
**Lakas**	**Gustavo "Gus" Tambunting**	**101,407**	**54.43**
PMP	Andres Jose "Anjo" Yllana	84,897	45.57
Total votes		**186,304**	**100.00%**
Lakas **hold**			

=== For Councilors ===
==== First District ====
City Council Elections for Parañaque's First District
Party	Candidate	Votes	%
**Liberal**	**Eric Olivarez**	**51,527**	59.18
**Nacionalista**	**Roselle Nava**	**46,464**	53.36
**Lakas**	**Jason Webb**	**41,955**	48.18
**Lakas**	**Raquel Gabriel**	**41,329**	47.47
**Nacionalista**	**Brillante "Bok" Inciong**	**37,275**	42.81
**Lakas**	**Rufino "Rufing" Allanigue**	**31,718**	36.43
**Lakas**	**Venesa "Alma Moreno" Lacsamana-Salic**	**30,060**	34.52
**Lakas**	**Ricardo "Eric" Baes Jr.**	**29,929**	34.37
Lakas	Joy "Kalinga" Delos Santos	27,194	
Liberal	Lorna "Baby" Campano	24,574	
Lakas	Florante "Jun" Romey Jr.	24,002	
Liberal	Jaime "Jimmy" Nery Jr.	23,700	
NPC	Joan Villafuerte-Densing	23,655	
Nacionalista	Dong Percival Brigola	20,838	
Liberal	Benito "Bining" Aragon	16,188	
Liberal	Abundio "Jim" Ferrer	14,763	
Independent	Dino "Guevarra" Ross	12,758	
Independent	Audie Daddy "Odi" De Leon	10,961	
Lakas	Jon "Bodjie" Salvador	10,318	
NPC	Jerry Lucas Biboso	8,364	
Independent	Gaspar "Sonny" Bobadilla	7,267	
NPC	Romeo "John" Arcilla	5,521	
NPC	Antonio "Marc" Duñgo	5,112	
Independent	Eulalio "Junior" Unizan	3,934	
Independent	Fortunato "Forting" Yabut	2,699	
Independent	Julio "Julie" Estrera	2,642	
Independent	Axel Gonzalez	1,838	
Independent	Andre Roy San Juan	1,375	
Independent	Tito "Toti" Isunza	770	
Total votes			100.00%

==== Second District ====
City Council Elections for Parañaque's Second District
Party	Candidate	Votes	%
**Lakas**	**Jose Enrico "Rico" Golez**	**78,548**	
**Lakas**	**Valmar "Val" Sotto**	**58,956**	
**Lakas**	**Edwin "Bong" Benzon**	**55,142**	
**Lakas**	**Florencio "Benjo" Bernabe III**	**54,570**	
**Lakas**	**Florencia "Beng" Amurao**	**51,006**	
**Lakas**	**Conchita "Baby' Bustamante**	**49,072**	
**PMP**	**John Ryan "Ryan" Yllana**	**47,838**	
**Lakas**	**Carlito "Doods" Antipuesto**	**45,800**	
Liberal	Vincent "Binky" Favis	40,067	
Lakas	Hilario "Larry" Bonsol	39,799	
PMP	Generoso "Gene" Puzon	35,885	
Nacionalista	Maritess "Tess" De Asis	33,238	
Nacionalista	Karlo Davila	25,713	
PMP	Felix "Alamat" Resuello	17,354	
Independent	Arnold Castillo	16,695	
Nacionalista	Maria Severina "Rina" Cadano	15,345	
PMP	Ramon "Monlapis" Panaligan	12,913	
Independent	Roberto "Butch" Serrano Jr.	11,840	
Independent	Albert "Allan" Visitacion Jr.	9,017	
Independent	Chito "Chit" Serrano	7,073	
Independent	Ronald Macaraig	4,556	
Total votes			**100.00%**
