= 2013 Parañaque local elections =

Part of Philippine general election

2013 Parañaque mayoral election
- May 13, 2013
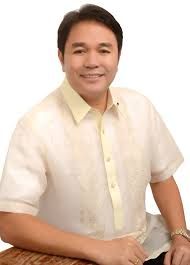
Nominee	Edwin Olivarez	Florencio "Benjo" Bernabe III
Party	Liberal	UNA
Running mate	Edwin "Bong" Benzon	Jose Enrico "Rico" Golez
Popular vote	115,851	82,551
Percentage	58.39	41.61
Mayor before election
Florencio Bernabe Jr.
Lakas
Elected mayor
Edwin Olivarez
Liberal

Local elections were held in Parañaque City on May 13, 2013, within the Philippine general election. The voters elected for the elective local posts in the city: the mayor, vice mayor, the congressman, and the councilors, eight of them in the two districts of the city.

== Background ==
Mayor Florencio M. Bernabe Jr. was term-limited. His son, Second District Councilor Florencio "Benjo" Bernabe III ran for his place. Bernabe was challenged by First District Representative Edwin Olivarez.

Vice Mayor Gustavo Tambunting was on his second term. He did not run for third and final term, instead, he ran as representative of Second District. Second District Councilor Jose Enrico "Rico" Golez, son of Rep. Jose Roilo Golez ran for his place. Golez was challenged by his fellow councilor, Edwin "Bong" Benzon of the same district.

First District Representative Edwin Olivarez was on his first term. He did not run for second term, instead he ran as Mayor. His brother, Councilor Eric Olivarez ran for his place. Olivarez was challenged by former Representative Eduardo Zialcita and former Councilor Florante "Jun" Romey Jr.

Second District Representative Roilo Golez was term-limited. Vice Mayor Gustavo "Gus" Tambunting ran for his place. Tambunting was challenged by former Mayor and actor Joselito "Joey" Marquez and Pacifico Rosal.

== Results ==
Names written in bold-Italic are the re-elected incumbents while in italic are incumbents lost in elections.

=== For Mayor ===
First District Representative Edwin Olivarez defeated Second District Councilor Florencio "Benjo" Bernabe.

Parañaque Mayoralty Election
Party	Candidate	Votes	%
**Liberal**	**Edwin Olivarez**	**115,851**	**58.39**
UNA	Florencio "Benjo" Bernabe III	82,551	41.61
Total votes		**198,402**	**100.00**
Liberal **hold**			

Mayoral Elections
**Olivarez**	58.39%
Bernabe	41.61%

=== For Vice Mayor ===
Second District Councilor Jose Enrico Golez defeated his fellow councilor, Edwin Benzon of the same district.

Parañaque Vice Mayoralty Election
Party	Candidate	Votes	%
**UNA**	**Jose Enrico “Rico” Golez**	**118,217**	**62.08**
Liberal	Edwin Benzon	72,206	37.92
Total votes		**190,423**	**100.00**
UNA **hold**			

Vice Mayoral Elections
**Golez**	62.08%
Benzon	37.92%

=== For Representatives ===
==== First District ====
Councilor Eric Olivarez won over Former Representative Eduardo "Ed" Zialcita and Former Councilor Florante "Jun" Romey Jr.

Congressional Election for Parañaque's First District
Party	Candidate	Votes	%
**Liberal**	**Eric Olivarez**	**50,981**	**62.81**
Nacionalista	Eduardo "Ed" Zialcita	28,651	35.30
Independent	Florante "Jun" Romey Jr.	1,533	1.89
Total votes		**81,165**	**100.00**
Liberal **hold**			

First District Congressional Elections
**Olivarez**	62.81%
Zialcita	35.30%
Romey	1.89%

==== Second District ====
Vice Mayor Gustavo Tambunting defeated former Mayor and actor Joselito "Joey" Marquez and Pacifico Rosal.

Congressional Election for Parañaque's Second District
Party	Candidate	Votes	%
**UNA**	**Gustavo “Gus” Tambunting**	**57,471**	**53.03**
Independent	Joselito "Joey" Marquez	47,912	44.21
Independent	Pacifico Rosal	2,992	2.76
Total votes		**108,375**	**100.00**
UNA **hold**			

Second District Congressional Elections
**Tambunting**	53.03%
Marquez	44.21%
Rosal	2.76%

=== For Councilors ===
==== First District ====
Member, City Council of Parañaque's First District
Party	Candidate	Votes	%
**UNA**	**Jason Webb**	**53,898**	
**UNA**	**Roselle Nava**	**51,566**	
**UNA**	**Racquel Gabriel**	**48,409**	
**Liberal**	**Joan Villafuerte-Densing**	**44,331**	
**Liberal**	**Venesa "Alma Moreno" Lacsamana-Salic**	**44,237**	
**UNA**	**Brillante "Bok" Inciong**	**42,108**	
**UNA**	**Ricardo "Eric" Baes**	**42,096**	
**Liberal**	**Rufino "Rufing" Allanigue**	**37,015**	
Liberal	Dindo "Delfin" Wenceslao	35,484	
UNA	Marilyn Burgos	29,837	
Liberal	Dulio "Dondon" Cailles	28,414	
Liberal	Marvin Santos	23,644	
UNA	Tukmol Rodriguez	23,364	
Liberal	Johnny Co	22,874	
UNA	Mel De Leon	21,532	
Liberal	Joey Rogacion	21,109	
Independent	Jimmy Diamante	4,610	
Total votes			**100.00**

==== Second District ====
Member, City Council of Parañaque's Second District
Party	Candidate	Votes	%
**UNA**	**Viktor Eriko "Wahoo" Sotto**	**55,137**	
**PMP**	**John Ryan Yllana**	**55,081**	
**UNA**	**Vincent Kenneth "Binky" Favis**	**53,835**	
**Liberal**	**Florencia "Beng" Amurao**	**49,335**	
**UNA**	**Merlie "Miles" Antipuesto**	**48,824**	
**UNA**	**Giovanni "Juvan" Esplana**	**48,727**	
**UNA**	**Jacqueline "Jackie" Bustamante**	**45,072**	
**Liberal**	**Maritess "Tess" De Asis**	**43,040**	
UNA	Jun Virata	42,095	
Liberal	Oliviere Belmonte	38,119	
Liberal	Bert Bonsol	37,114	
UNA	Mithor Singson	36,672	
Independent	Gene Puzon	35,816	
UNA	Pol Casale	32,920	
Independent	Richard Padilla Scheerer	30,271	
Liberal	Fely Manahan	28,724	
Liberal	Alamat Resuello	20,830	
Independent	Arnold Castillo	15,542	
Independent	Jobelle Salvador	5,445	
Independent	Franco Facundo Roco	4,058	
Independent	Ronald Macaraig	3,450	
Independent	Zandro Mate	1,853	
Total votes			**100.00**
