= Eduardo Zialcita =

Filipino public servant, politician and businessman

The Honorable Eduardo Zialcita

Member of the Philippine House of Representatives from Parañaque
- In office June 30, 2004 – June 30, 2010
- Preceded by: Post created
- Succeeded by: Edwin Olivarez
- Constituency: 1st District
- In office June 30, 2001 – June 30, 2004
- Preceded by: Roilo Golez
- Succeeded by: Post dissolved
- Constituency: Lone District

Personal details
- Born: December 15, 1950 (age 75) Manila, Philippines
- Party: Nacionalista (2009–present)
- Other political affiliations: Lakas (1997–2009)
- Spouse: Claudine de Castro-Zialcita
- Children: 4
- Education: San Sebastian College – Recoletos; Georgetown University
- Alma mater: University of the Philippines Diliman; University of Asia and the Pacific (MBA); International Academy of Management and Economics
- Occupation: Professor, Politician
- Profession: Businessman
- Nickname: EDZA

Eduardo Castro Zialcita is a Filipino public servant, businessman, and academic who currently serves as the Dean of the Graduate School of Business at University of Perpetual Help System. He is also a professor on the Master of Business Administration and Doctor of Philosophy programs at the same university and Pamantasan ng Lungsod ng Maynila. As a politician, he served as Representative of Parañaque for its Lone District from 2001 to 2004 and its 1st District from 2004 to 2010.

== Education ==
Zialcita completed his elementary education at San Sebastian College – Recoletos in 1962 as a valedictorian and his secondary education at the same college in 1967 as a salutatorian. He took up mass communication at the University of the Philippines Diliman. He then finished his masters in business administration at the University of Asia and the Pacific and became a government scholar at Georgetown University. He completed his doctorate at the International Academy of Management and Economics.

== Political career ==
Zialcita was elected Representative of Parañaque for its Lone District in 2001 until the district was divided into two in 2004. During his first term, he was voted the Outstanding Neophyte Legislator in August 2002. He was re-elected in 2004 as the first representative of the 1st District of Parañaque. He was re-elected to his third consecutive term in 2007 and served until 2010.

Being term-limited as representative, he ran for Mayor of Parañaque in 2010 with former Vice Mayor and celebrity Anjo Yllana as his running mate, but lost to incumbent Florencio Bernabe, Jr. He later sought a comeback to the Congress by running for the 1st district in 2013 but lost to councilor Eric Olivarez.
