= Eric Jed Olivarez =

Filipino tennis player (born 1998)

- Full name: Eric L. Olivarez, Jr.
- Country (sports): Philippines
- Born: April 18, 1998 (age 28)
- Plays: Right-handed (double-handed backhand)

Singles
- Career record: 4–1
- Career titles: 0

Doubles
- Career record: 0–0
- Career titles: 0

Team competitions
- Davis Cup: 4–1

Eric Olivarez Jr. (born April 18, 1998), commonly known as Eric Jed Olivarez is a Filipino professional tennis player.

== Background ==
Olivarez played for the Western Michigan Broncos men's tennis team from 2015 to 2019.

In the Philippines, Olivarez bagged the Mayor Eric Olivarez National Open in August 2024, ending Johnny Arcilla's streak and the Rep. Edwin National Open Championship titles in October 2024.

Olivarez debuted for the Philippine Davis Cup team in the 2021. He was named part of the team in 2020 for the tournament later postponed by a year due to the COVID-19 pandemic. However the Philippine Tennis Association was suspended from 2021 to 2023.

When the team returned for the 2024 edition, they started over in the Group V Asia/Oceania division. Olivarez was once again part of the team which earned a promotion to Group IV.

== Personal life ==
His father, Eric Olivarez, is the incumbent representative for Parañaque's 1st congressional district. He came from a tennis family with his father, his uncle Edwin, and grandfather Pablo, all held the position of Philippine Tennis Association at some point of the federation's history.
