= Parañaque's at-large congressional district =

Election district in Parañaque, Philippines

Parañaque's at-large congressional district may refer to three occasions when a city-wide or provincewide at-large Congressional district was used for elections to the Philippine House of Representatives from Parañaque in the Philippines.

Parañaque was initially represented as part of the at-large district of the province of Manila in the Malolos Congress from 1898 to 1899. The then-town was later incorporated to the province of Rizal, established in 1901, and was represented as part of the first district of Rizal from 1907 to 1941 and from 1945 to 1972. It was incorporated to the City of Greater Manila and was represented as part of the at-large district of Manila from 1943 to 1944. Parañaque was separated from Rizal on November 7, 1975 by virtue of Presidential Decree No. 824, and was represented in the Interim Batasang Pambansa along with other Metropolitan Manila municipalities and cities as part of Region IV from 1978 to 1984.

Parañaque was grouped with Las Piñas in the Regular Batasang Pambansa from 1984 to 1986, as the Legislative district of Las Piñas–Parañaque. It was granted its own representation in the restored House of Representatives in 1987, and was divided into two districts after its city charter (Republic Act No. 8507) was amended by Republic Act No. 9229, approved on December 17, 2003.

== Representation history ==
#	Image	Member	Term of office		Congress	Party	Electoral history
#	Image	Member	Start	End	Congress	Party	Electoral history
=== Parañaque's at-large district for the House of Representatives of the Philippines ===
District created February 2, 1987.
1		Freddie Webb	June 30, 1987	June 30, 1992	8th	Lakas ng Bansa	Elected in 1987.
1		Freddie Webb	June 30, 1987	June 30, 1992	8th	LDP	Elected in 1987.
2		Jose Roilo Golez	June 30, 1992	January 20, 2001	9th	LDP	Elected in 1992.
2		Jose Roilo Golez	June 30, 1992	January 20, 2001	10th	Lakas	Re-elected in 1995.
2		Jose Roilo Golez	June 30, 1992	January 20, 2001	11th	LAMMP	Re-elected in 1998. Resigned on appointment as National Security Adviser.
2		Jose Roilo Golez	June 30, 1992	January 20, 2001	11th	Lakas	Re-elected in 1998. Resigned on appointment as National Security Adviser.
3		Eduardo Zialcita	June 30, 2001	June 30, 2004	12th	Lakas	Elected in 2001. Redistricted to the 1st district.
District dissolved into Parañaque's 1st and 2nd districts.
