= Roilo Golez =

Filipino politician (1947–2018)

The Honorable Jose Roilo S. Golez
- Official portrait, 2010

Member of the Philippine House of Representatives from Parañaque
- In office June 30, 2004 – June 30, 2013
- Preceded by: District created
- Succeeded by: Gustavo Tambunting
- Constituency: 2nd district
- In office June 30, 1992 – January 20, 2001
- Preceded by: Freddie Webb
- Succeeded by: Eduardo Zialcita
- Constituency: Lone district

National Security Adviser
- In office January 20, 2001 – December 31, 2003
- Preceded by: Alexander Aguirre
- Succeeded by: Victor Mayo

Personal details
- Born: José Roilo Solís Gólez; January 9, 1947 Looc, Romblon, Philippines
- Died: June 11, 2018 (aged 71) Parañaque, Metro Manila, Philippines
- Resting place: The Heritage Park, Taguig, Philippines
- Party: Independent (2009; 2015–2018)
- Other political affiliations: KAMPI (2004–2008); Lakas (1991–2004; 2008–2009); Liberal (2009–2015)
- Spouse: Natalia Gólez
- Children: 2, inc. Jose Enrico

Military service
- Allegiance: Philippines
- Branch/service: Philippine Navy
- Rank: Captain

José Roilo Solís Gólez (January 9, 1947 – June 11, 2018) was a Filipino politician who last served his sixth term as Member of the Philippine House of Representatives representing the Second District of Parañaque, one of the most industrialized districts of the Philippines. A veteran legislator, he was elected in 1992, 1995, 1998, 2004, 2007, and 2010 all by landslide victories and had served as Congressman for six terms: in the 9th, 10th, 11th, 13th, 14th, and 15th Congress of the Philippines. He has also was the National Security Adviser during the presidency of Gloria Macapagal Arroyo from 2001 to 2003.

== Early life and education ==
Gólez was born on January 9, 1947, in the small town of Looc, Romblon in the Philippines. His father was a Philippine Naval Captain. He grew up in a low cost government housing project and was a product of public schools. Coming from a rural area, Gólez rose to success in academics, sports, government, business, civic organizations and politics.

Gólez went to the Philippine Military Academy and US Naval Academy at Annapolis, Maryland, where he graduated with a Bachelor of Science degree, major in mathematics and operations analysis in the Class of 1970. While at Annapolis, he distinguished himself in academics, leadership and sports. He was consistently in the Superintendent's Honor List. He was selected company commander, a high position in the Brigade of Midshipmen and was a brigade boxing champion for four straight years, establishing a record as the first to achieve this feat since the Academy was established in 1845. So far, only fourteen midshipmen have won four brigade boxing championships in the academy's history.

After Annapolis, Gólez took up Master in Business Administration (MBA) in the University of the Philippines where he graduated valedictorian of his class.

== Political career ==
Gólez served five years as Postmaster General of the Philippines from 1981 to 1986, where he received the prestigious Ten Outstanding Young Men Award (TOYM) for public service excellence. He later served three years as a member of the Philippine Cabinet from 2001 to 2004, as National Security Adviser and thus overseeing the country's counterterrorism and national security program.

=== House of Representatives (1992–2001; 2004–2013) ===
Gólez served eighteen years as congressman of the Republic of the Philippines. He had consistently received the award for One of the Most Outstanding Congressmen of the Philippines, had a perfect 100% attendance record, no absence, in all the sessions of Congress since he became a congressman in 1992. He served his sixth term as Congressman and won all his election victories by landslide, thus earning the title "Landslide King of Paranaque." He had served as chairman of the Committee on Public Order & Security, chairman of the Committee on National Defense and as Deputy Minority Leader. Gólez was also credited for concreting the most number of roads and constructing the most number of school buildings in the history of Parañaque.

Among the members of Gólez's staff was Maria Lourdes "Malou" Tiquia, who was his legislative chief of staff from 1992 to 1999.

=== Other ventures ===
- Twenty years as governor of the Philippine National Red Cross, where he received the Bayani Red Cross Gold Medal Award for heroism and bravery in the face of gunfire while leading a Red Cross rescue team to rescue wounded soldiers during the December 1989 coup attempt.
- One year as national president of the Boy Scouts of the Philippines.
- Two years as fund campaign chairman of the Philippine Cancer Society.
- Four years as division fund campaign chairman of the Philippine Tuberculosis Society.
- Two years as chairman of the Elks Cerebral Palsy Project.
- Four years as governor of the Management Association of the Philippines.
- Twenty-eight years as a Rotarian of the Rotary Club of Manila.
- Two years as national president of the Amateur Boxing Association of the Philippines.
- Two years as president of the Philippine Olympic Academy.
- Five years as a member of the board of trustees of the St. Luke's Medical Center.
- Fourteen years as a Philippine Navy officer, reaching the rank of navy captain (full colonel in the army).
- Four years as professor in the Master in Business Administration Program of the University of the Philippines.
- Four years as professor of management in the Asian Institute of Management.

Gólez had extensive experience in corporate affairs, having been chief executive officer, chief operating officer, or board member in several major corporations in the field of shipbuilding, health products, fast foods, real estate, marketing, security equipment, telecommunications, banking, oil exploration and insurance.

== Personal life ==
Golez was married to Natalia Golez. Together, they had two children: Jose Enrico ("Rico") and Maria Guadalupe ("Guada"). Both children have also entered local politics, as Rico is a councilor from the 2nd district of Parañaque and previously vice mayor from 2013 and 2022, while Guada unsuccessfully ran for 1st district councilor in 2025.

== Death ==
Golez died on June 11, 2018, after suffering a heart attack. His funeral was held at The Heritage Park in Taguig, where he would be laid to rest.

== See also ==
- Congress of the Philippines
- House of Representatives of the Philippines

House of Representatives of the Philippines
Preceded by Freddie Webb	Representative, Lone District of Parañaque; 1992–2001	Succeeded by Eduardo Zialcita
New district	Representative, 2nd District of Parañaque; 2004 – 2013	Succeeded by Gustavo Tambunting
Political offices
Preceded by Alexander Aguirre	National Security Adviser; 2001–2003	Succeeded by Victor Mayo
