= Parañaque's 1st congressional district =

House of Representatives of the Philippines legislative district

- Constituency for the House of Representatives of the Philippines
- Map
- Location of Parañaque within Metro Manila
- City: Parañaque
- Region: Metro Manila
- Population: 265,839 (2020)
- Electorate: 139,653 (2025)
- Major settlements: 8 barangays: Baclaran; Don Galo; La Huerta; San Dionisio; San Isidro; Santo Niño; Tambo; Vitalez
- Area: 17.06 km^{2} (6.59 sq mi)

Current constituency
- Created: 2003
- Representative: Eric Olivarez
- Political party: Lakas
- Congressional bloc: Majority

Parañaque's 1st congressional district is one of the two congressional districts of the Philippines in the city of Parañaque. It has been represented in the House of Representatives of the Philippines since 2004. The districts consists of the western Parañaque barangays of Baclaran, Don Galo, La Huerta, San Dionisio, San Isidro, Santo Niño, Tambo, and Vitalez bordering Las Piñas and Pasay. It is currently represented in the 20th Congress by Eric Olivarez of the Lakas–CMD.

== Representation history ==
#	Image	Member	Term of office		Congress	Party	Electoral history	Constituent LGUs
#	Image	Member	Start	End	Congress	Party	Electoral history	Constituent LGUs
=== Parañaque's 1st district for the House of Representatives of the Philippines ===
District created December 17, 2003.
1		Eduardo Zialcita	June 30, 2004	June 30, 2010	13th	Lakas	Redistricted from the at-large district and re-elected in 2004.	2004–present Baclaran, Don Galo, La Huerta, San Dionisio, San Isidro, Santo Niño, Tambo, Vitalez
1		Eduardo Zialcita	June 30, 2004	June 30, 2010	14th	Nacionalista	Re-elected in 2007.	2004–present Baclaran, Don Galo, La Huerta, San Dionisio, San Isidro, Santo Niño, Tambo, Vitalez
2		Edwin Olivarez	June 30, 2010	June 30, 2013	15th	Liberal	Elected in 2010.	2004–present Baclaran, Don Galo, La Huerta, San Dionisio, San Isidro, Santo Niño, Tambo, Vitalez
3		Eric Olivarez	June 30, 2013	June 30, 2022	16th	Liberal	Elected in 2013.	2004–present Baclaran, Don Galo, La Huerta, San Dionisio, San Isidro, Santo Niño, Tambo, Vitalez
3		Eric Olivarez	June 30, 2013	June 30, 2022	17th	PDP–Laban	Re-elected in 2016.	2004–present Baclaran, Don Galo, La Huerta, San Dionisio, San Isidro, Santo Niño, Tambo, Vitalez
3		Eric Olivarez	June 30, 2013	June 30, 2022	18th	PDP–Laban	Re-elected in 2019.	2004–present Baclaran, Don Galo, La Huerta, San Dionisio, San Isidro, Santo Niño, Tambo, Vitalez
(2)		Edwin Olivarez	June 30, 2022	June 30, 2025	19th	PDP–Laban	Elected in 2022.	2004–present Baclaran, Don Galo, La Huerta, San Dionisio, San Isidro, Santo Niño, Tambo, Vitalez
(2)		Edwin Olivarez	June 30, 2022	June 30, 2025	19th	Lakas	Elected in 2022.	2004–present Baclaran, Don Galo, La Huerta, San Dionisio, San Isidro, Santo Niño, Tambo, Vitalez
(3)		Eric Olivarez	June 30, 2025	Incumbent	20th	Lakas	Elected in 2025.	2004–present Baclaran, Don Galo, La Huerta, San Dionisio, San Isidro, Santo Niño, Tambo, Vitalez

== Election results ==
=== 2025 ===
2025 Philippine House of Representatives election in the 1st District of Parañaque
Party	Candidate	Votes	%
Lakas	Eric Olivarez	73,351	100.00%
Total votes		73,351	100.00%
Lakas hold			

=== 2022 ===
2022 Philippine House of Representatives election in the 1st District of Parañaque
Party	Candidate	Votes	%
PDP–Laban	Edwin Olivarez	91,241	90.16
Aksyon	Jayson Moral	5,662	5.60
Independent	Pedro Montaño	4,292	4.24
Total votes		101,195	100.00
PDP–Laban hold			

=== 2019 ===
2019 Philippine House of Representatives election in the 1st District of Parañaque
Party	Candidate	Votes	%
PDP–Laban	Eric Olivarez (Incumbent)	74,692	84.45%
Lakas	Jimmy delos Santos	13,743	15.54%
Total votes		88,435	100.00%
PDP–Laban hold			

=== 2016 ===
2016 Philippine House of Representatives election in 1st District of Parañaque
Party	Candidate	Votes	%
Liberal	Eric Olivarez (Incumbent)	79,760	97.26%
UNA	Vic Celeridad	2,243	2.73%
Total votes		82,003	100.00%
Liberal hold			

=== 2013 ===
2013 Philippine House of Representatives election in 1st District of Parañaque
Party	Candidate	Votes	%
Liberal	Eric Olivarez	42,618	
Nacionalista	Eduardo Zialcita	23,870	
Independent	Florante "Jun" Romey Jr.	1,225	
Total votes			
Liberal hold			

=== 2010 ===
2010 Philippine House of Representatives election in 1st District of Parañaque
Party	Candidate	Votes	%
Liberal	Edwin Olivarez	43,005	53.30
Lakas–Kampi	Rolando Bernabe	25,295	31.35
KKK	Delfin Wenceslao, Jr.	6,813	8.44
NPC	Epimaco Densing III	2,897	3.59
Independent	Edison Javier	2,581	3.20
Independent	Fortunata Magsombol	101	0.13
Valid ballots		80,692	92.67
Invalid or blank votes		6,381	7.33
Total votes		87,073	100.00
Liberal gain from Nacionalista			

== See also ==
- Legislative districts of Parañaque
