= Edwin Olivarez =

Filipino politician (born 1963)

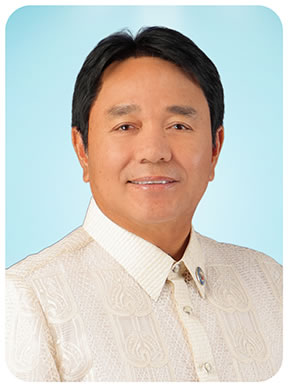
- Official portrait, 2022

25th & 27th Mayor of Parañaque
- Incumbent
- Assumed office June 30, 2025
- Vice Mayor: Benjo Bernabe
- Preceded by: Eric Olivarez
- In office June 30, 2013 – June 30, 2022
- Vice Mayor: Rico Golez
- Preceded by: Florencio Bernabe Jr.
- Succeeded by: Eric Olivarez

Member of the House of Representatives from Parañaque's 1st district
- In office June 30, 2022 – June 30, 2025
- Preceded by: Eric Olivarez
- Succeeded by: Eric Olivarez
- In office June 30, 2010 – June 30, 2013
- Preceded by: Eduardo Zialcita
- Succeeded by: Eric Olivarez

Chair of the House Government Enterprises and Privatization Committee
- In office July 25, 2022 – June 30, 2025
- Preceded by: Eric Olivarez

Chairman of Regional Peace and Order Council – National Capital Region
- In office November 2019 – June 30, 2022

10th Vice Governor of Laguna
- In office June 30, 2004 – June 30, 2007
- Governor: Teresita Lazaro
- Preceded by: Danilo Fernandez
- Succeeded by: Ramil Hernandez

Member of the Laguna Provincial Board from the 1st district
- In office June 30, 2001 – June 30, 2004

Personal details
- Born: Edwin de Leon Olivarez; August 14, 1963 (age 63) Manila, Philippines
- Party: Lakas (until 2007; 2023–present)
- Other political affiliations: PDP–Laban (2018–2023); Liberal (2009–2018); UNO (2007–2009)
- Spouse: Janet Angeles-Olivarez
- Children: 3
- Parent(s): Pablo R. Olivarez; Rosario de Leon-Olivarez
- Relatives: Eric (brother); Eric Jed (nephew)
- Education: De La Salle University (BS); Olivarez College (MBA)
- Occupation: Politician
- Profession: Businessman

Edwin de Leon Olivarez (born August 14, 1963) is a Filipino politician, athlete, and businessman who served as a Member of the Philippine House of Representatives from Parañaque's 1st District from 2022 to 2025 and previously from 2010 to 2013. He previously served as Mayor of Parañaque from 2013 to 2022, as well as the Metro Manila Council Chair and head of the Regional Peace and Order Council – National Capital Region in concurrent capacity. He also served as board member of Laguna before serving as Vice Governor of Laguna from 2004 to 2007. He unsuccessfully ran for Governor of Laguna in 2007.

Olivarez played on the national tennis team, and was NCAA Junior and Senior Tennis Champion.

== Early life ==
Born in Manila, Olivarez is the son of former mayor Pablo Olivarez and older brother of incumbent Parañaque 1st district representative Eric Olivarez.

== Political career ==
Olivarez served one term each as Laguna Provincial Board member from the 1st district from 2001 to 2004 and as Vice Governor of Laguna under Governor Teresita Lazaro from 2004 to 2007. He ran for Governor of Laguna under United Opposition in 2007, but lost to Lazaro. He later transferred to Parañaque, where he was elected representative of the city's 1st district in 2010, serving until 2013.

=== Mayor of Parañaque (2013–2022) ===
The logo of the tagline Bagong Parañaque, 'New Parañaque', Olivarez' series of political campaigns.

Olivarez was elected to three terms as Mayor of Parañaque, serving from 2013 to 2022.

In the 2013 Parañaque local elections, he ran under the tagline Ang Bagong Parañaque, 'the new Parañaque', receiving criticism from netizens for his "badly written graduation message" March of that year.

During his third term, he concurrently served as the Metro Manila Council Chair and head of the Regional Peace and Order Council – National Capital Region.

=== House of Representatives (2022–2025) ===
Upon being term-limited, Olivarez was once again elected representative of the 1st district in 2022, switching places with his brother Eric Olivarez.

In November 2023, Olivarez left PDP-Laban to join the Lakas–CMD party.

On February 5, 2025, Olivarez was among the 95 Lakas–CMD members who voted to impeach vice president Sara Duterte.

=== Mayor of Parañaque (2025-Present) ===
Olivarez was elected Mayor of Parañaque in 2025, switching places with his brother Eric once again.

== Personal life ==
Olivarez is married to Janet Angeles and they have three children. His eldest son, Pablo II, is an incumbent councilor of Parañaque from the 1st district since 2022.
