= Eric Olivarez =

Filipino politician

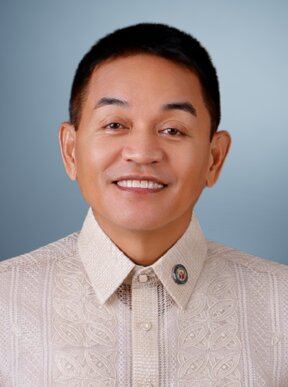
- Official portrait, 2025

Member of the Philippine House of Representatives from Parañaque's 1st district
- Incumbent
- Assumed office June 30, 2025
- Preceded by: Edwin Olivarez
- In office June 30, 2013 – June 30, 2022
- Preceded by: Edwin Olivarez
- Succeeded by: Edwin Olivarez

26th Mayor of Parañaque
- In office June 30, 2022 – June 30, 2025
- Vice Mayor: Joan Villafuerte-Densing
- Preceded by: Edwin Olivarez
- Succeeded by: Edwin Olivarez

Member of Parañaque City Council from the 1st district
- In office June 30, 2007 – June 30, 2013

Personal details
- Born: Eric de Leon Olivarez Malate, Manila, Philippines
- Party: Lakas (2024–present)
- Other political affiliations: PDP (2018–2024); Liberal (2009–2018); PMP (2007–2009)
- Relations: Edwin Olivarez (brother)
- Children: 2, including Eric Jed
- Parents: Pablo Olivarez (father); Rosario de Leon-Olivarez (mother)
- Education: California State University, Los Angeles (BS); De La Salle University (BA, MS, EdD)
- Occupation: Professor, politician
- Profession: Nurse, educator

Eric de Leon Olivarez is a Filipino politician who has served as the representative for Parañaque's first district since 2025, a seat he previously held from 2013 to 2022. Between his terms, he served as the 26th mayor of Parañaque, switching positions with his brother Edwin Olivarez.

== Academic career ==
Eric Olivarez earned his undergraduate degree for Bachelor of Arts major in History & Political Science at De La Salle University, Manila. He later earned his degree for Bachelor of Science in nursing at the California State University and passed the National Council Licensure Examination (NCLEx) in Los Angeles, California, USA.

Upon returning to the Philippines to manage their family-owned school, he also finished his Masteral and Doctoral Degrees in Educational Management at De La Salle University, Manila.

Olivarez became a Commissioner and Accreditor at the Philippine Association of Colleges and Universities – Commission on Accreditation (PACUCOA, Inc.) and a Member of the Regional Quality Assessment Team - Teacher Education Program of the Commission on Higher Education in the National Capital Region. He also served as Vice President for Academics and Services at Olivarez College in Parañaque and as a graduate school assistant professor lecturer at the Br. Andrew Gonzalez College of Education of De La Salle University.

== Politics ==
Olivarez entered politics in 2007 when he ran for a seat on the Parañaque City Council, where he served for six years. In 2013, he ran for the city's first district congressional seat and won, succeeding his older brother, Edwin Olivarez, who was elected mayor. He served as congressman for three consecutive terms until 2022, when he and his brother effectively switched positions. Eric ran and won the mayoralty, while Edwin stepped down.

In the 2025 National and Local Election, Olivarez once again ran for the congressional seat of the first district and successfully reclaimed the position. In a parallel move, his brother Edwin ran for mayor and was also re-elected, marking another switch in their political roles.

== Awards and Recognitions ==
During his term as City Mayor, Eric L. Olivarez has received numerous accolades from various organizations, including Outstanding Public Servant of the Year 2023 from the RP-Mission and Development Foundation, Inc. and recognition as a Circle of Excellence Honoree at the 7th Philippine Empowered Men and Women Awards 2024.

Mayor Olivarez achieved another milestone after being recognized as one of the Top Performing Mayors in the National Capital Region in the 2024 “Boses ng Bayan” survey. According to data from the HKPH Public Opinion and Research Center, Mayor Olivarez earned a remarkable 92.9% job approval rating, placing him among the highest-rated local chief executives in the National Capital Region.

His public service has also been consistently acknowledged, having been named one of the top-performing mayors both in the National Capital Region and across the Philippines by the RP-Mission and Development Foundation, Inc. and the Hong Kong Philippines Opinion and Research Center.

== Personal life ==
Eric Olivarez has two sons, including Eric Jed, a professional tennis player. and Pablo “Thirdy” Olivarez III.
