= 2025 Parañaque local elections =

Part of the 2025 Philippine general election

| ← 2022 | May 12, 2025 | 2028 → |
- Mayoral election
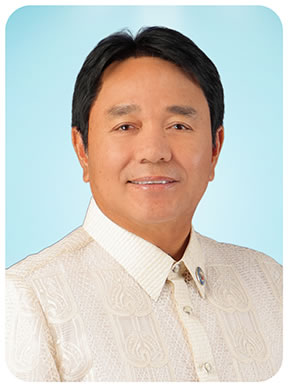

| Candidate | Edwin Olivarez | John Andrew Uy |
| Party | Lakas | Independent |
| Running mate | Joan Villafuerte | — |
| Popular vote | 142,561 | 63,556 |
| Percentage | 53.69% | 23.94% |
| Candidate | Julius Anthony Zaide |
| Party | Aksyon |
| Running mate | — |
| Popular vote | 49,386 |
| Percentage | 18.60% |
Mayor before election
Eric Olivarez
PDP–Laban
Elected mayor
Edwin Olivarez
Lakas-CMD
- Vice mayoral election

| Candidate | Benjo Bernabe | Joan Villafuerte |
| Party | PFP | Lakas |
| Popular vote | 130,291 | 123,193 |
| Percentage | 51.40% | 48.60% |
Vice Mayor before election
Joan Villafuerte
Liberal
Elected Vice Mayor
Benjo Bernabe
PFP

Local elections were held in Parañaque on May 12, 2025, as part of the 2025 Philippine general election. The electorate will elect a mayor, a vice mayor, sixteen members of the Parañaque City Council, and two district representatives to the House of Representatives of the Philippines.

== Background ==
Team Bagong Parañaque, led by brothers incumbent Mayor Eric Olivarez and incumbent first district representative Edwin Olivarez, dominated the 2022 Parañaque local elections. However, rumors started to circulate that similar to some of the other ruling political families in Metro Manila, the Olivarez family were also on the verge of splitting up over who should run for mayor between the two. While the brothers eventually resolved their differences to run together under a reformed Team Bagong Parañaque ticket, some of their relatives chose to break away from the family by either running directly against them, or joining rival political factions.

Meanwhile, a mix of old and new political rivals are also independently vying unseat the incumbent Olivarezes and their allies.

== Candidates ==
Candidates in italics indicate incumbents seeking reelection.

=== Administration coalition ===
Team Bagong Parañaque
| Position | # | Name | Party |
|---|---|---|---|
| Mayor | 3. | Edwin Olivarez | Lakas |
| Vice mayor | 2. | Joan Villafuerte | Lakas |
| 1st district House representative | 1. | Eric Olivarez | Lakas |
| 2nd district House representative | 4. | Gustavo Tambunting | NUP |
| 1st district councilor | 1. | Daniel Eric Baes | Lakas |
| 1st district councilor | 7. | Rina Gabriel | Lakas |
| 1st district councilor | 8. | Guada Golez | Lakas |
| 1st district councilor | 9. | Brillante Inciong | Lakas |
| 1st district councilor | 11. | Yeoj Marquez | Lakas |
| 1st district councilor | 13. | Paolo Olivarez | Lakas |
| 1st district councilor | 17. | Allen Ford Tan | Lakas |
| 1st district councilor | 19. | Abby Viduya | Lakas |
| 2nd district councilor | 1. | Florencia Amurao | Lakas |
| 2nd district councilor | 2. | Sheilla Benzon | Lakas |
| 2nd district councilor | 4. | Rafael Lito Dela Peña | Lakas |
| 2nd district councilor | 5. | Maria Kristine Esplana | Lakas |
| 2nd district councilor | 8. | Jerome Bart Frias | Lakas |
| 2nd district councilor | 9. | Rico Golez | Lakas |
| 2nd district councilor | 15. | Wahoo Sotto | NPC |
| 2nd district councilor | 16. | John Ryan Yllana | Lakas |

=== Other coalitions ===
Team At Your SerVice
| Position | # | Candidate | Party |
|---|---|---|---|
| Vice mayor | 1. | Benjo Bernabe | PFP |
| 2nd district House representative | 5. | Brian Yamsuan | Independent |
| 1st district councilor | 2. | Ron Catunao | PFP |
| 1st district councilor | 3. | Joey Delos Santos | PFP |
| 1st district councilor | 14 | Shannin Mae Olivarez-Bernardo | PFP |
| 1st district councilor | 18. | Roberto Vazquez | Independent |
| 2nd district councilor | 3. | Tess De Asis | PFP |
| 2nd district councilor | 6. | Binky Favis | Independent |

Team Drew Uy 2025
| Position | # | Candidate | Party |
|---|---|---|---|
| Mayor | 6. | John Andrew Uy | Independent |
| 1st district councilor | 12. | Christian Eric Martinez | Independent |

Labor Party Philippines
| Position | # | Candidate | Party |
|---|---|---|---|
| Mayor | 5. | Nathan Pineda | WPP |
| 2nd district Representative | 3. | Rodel Espinola | WPP |

=== Other parties ===
Partido Demokratiko Pilipino
| Position | # | Name | Party |
|---|---|---|---|
| 1st district councilor | 4. | Julius Disamburun | PDP |

Aksyon Demokratiko
| Position | # | Name | Party |
|---|---|---|---|
| Mayor | 7. | Jun Zaide | Aksyon |

Kilusang Bagong Lipunan
| Position | # | Name | Party |
|---|---|---|---|
| 2nd district councilor | 13. | Dante B. Peolino Jr. | KBL |

Independents
| Position | # | Name | Party |
|---|---|---|---|
| Mayor | 1. | Rhodora Mendoza | Independent |
| Mayor | 2. | Aileen Claire Olivarez | Independent |
| Mayor | 4. | Anabel Pantila | Independent |
| 2nd District Representative | 1. | Rolando Aguilar | Independent |
| 2nd District Representative | 2. | Florentino Baguio | Independent |
| 1st District Councilor | 5. | Ariel G. Fernandez | Independent |
| 1st District Councilor | 6. | Raquel Gabriel-Velasco | Independent |
| 1st District Councilor | 10. | Razel C. Lagman | Independent |
| 1st District Councilor | 15. | Christopher H. Rivera | Independent |
| 1st District Councilor | 16. | Melencio R. Santos | Independent |
| 2nd District Councilor | 7. | Nicolai B. Felix | Independent |
| 2nd District Councilor | 10. | Gaspar A. Hachuela | Independent |
| 2nd District Councilor | 11. | Glenn J. Manio | Independent |
| 2nd District Councilor | 12. | Menandro D. Molina | Independent |
| 2nd District Councilor | 14. | Felix G. Resuello | Independent |

== Mayoral election ==
The incumbent mayor is Eric Olivarez, who has served since 2022 after being elected with 64.3% of the vote. He was eligible for reelection for a second consecutive term, but instead chose to run for representative. His party nominated his brother and former mayor Edwin Olivarez to run for the position.

The main opponents for the position are the incumbent's wife Aileen Claire Olivarez and the 2022 mayoral candidates, the incumbent Barangay Baclaran Chairman Jun Zaide running under Aksyon Demokratiko, and John Andrew Uy also known as "Drew Uy" running as an independent candidate, who gained strong support from the youth and emerged as a relatively fresh challenger for the mayoral seat.

=== Results ===
2025 Parañaque mayoral election
| Candidate | Party | Votes | % |
|---|---|---|---|
| Edwin Olivarez | Lakas–CMD | 142,561 | 53.69 |
| John Andrew Uy | Independent | 63,556 | 23.94 |
| Jun Zaide | Aksyon Demokratiko | 49,386 | 18.60 |
| Aileen Claire Olivarez | Independent | 6,127 | 2.31 |
| Rhodora Mendoza | Independent | 2,204 | 0.83 |
| Nathan Pineda | Labor Party Philippines | 964 | 0.36 |
| Anabel Pantila | Independent | 737 | 0.28 |
| Total | | 265,535 | 100.00 |

== Vice mayoral election ==
The incumbent vice mayor is Joan Villafuerte, who has served since 2022 after being elected in a close election with 39.14% of the vote. She is eligible to run for a second consecutive term.

Her opponent is Benjo Bernabe, a former city councilor and son of former mayor Jun Bernabe.

=== Results ===
2025 Parañaque vice mayoral election
| Candidate | Party | Votes | % |
|---|---|---|---|
| Benjo Bernabe | Partido Federal ng Pilipinas | 130,291 | 51.40 |
| Joan Villafuerte (incumbent) | Lakas–CMD | 123,193 | 48.60 |
| Total | | 253,484 | 100.00 |

== City Council election ==
The Parañaque City Council is composed of 18 members, 16 of which are elected through plurality block voting to serve three-year terms. The councilors represent the city's two legislative districts.

| Party | Votes | % | Seats |
|---|---|---|---|
| Lakas–CMD | 956,708 | 59.10 | 11 |
| Partido Federal ng Pilipinas | 185,221 | 11.44 | 2 |
| Nationalist People's Coalition | 92,854 | 5.74 | 1 |
| Kilusang Bagong Lipunan | 10,323 | 0.64 | 0 |
| Partido Demokratiko Pilipino | 6,511 | 0.40 | 0 |
| Independent | 367,047 | 22.68 | 2 |
| Ex officio seats | | | 2 |
| Total | 1,618,664 | 100.00 | 18 |

=== First district ===
The first city council district is composed of the city's western barangays, namely Baclaran, Don Galo, La Huerta, San Dionisio, San Isidro, Santo Niño, Tambo and Vitalez.

The last election saw the administration coalition win a supermajority in the district, winning seven out of eight seats.

==== Term-limited ====
- Pablo Gabriel Jr.
  - Term-limited. His wife, Rina Gabriel, is running for the position
- Marvin Santos
- Vandolph Quizon
  - Term-limited.
- Jomari Yllana
  - Term-limited. His wife, actress Maria Isabel "Abby" Viduya, more commonly known as "Priscilla Almeda", is running for the position

===== Results =====
2025 Parañaque City Council election - District 1
| Candidate | Party or alliance | | Votes | % |
|---|---|---|---|---|
| Raquel Gabriel-Velasco | Independent | | 59,299 | 56.23 |
| Pablo A. Olivarez II | Team Bagong Parañaque | Lakas–CMD | 58,614 | 55.58 |
| Daniel Eric M. Baes | Team Bagong Parañaque | Lakas–CMD | 56,319 | 53.40 |
| Allen Ford L. Tan | Team Bagong Parañaque | Lakas–CMD | 53,219 | 50.46 |
| Charles Yeoj L. Marquez | Team Bagong Parañaque | Lakas–CMD | 47,743 | 45.27 |
| Brillante V. Inciong | Team Bagong Parañaque | Lakas–CMD | 47,617 | 45.15 |
| Carina S. Gabriel | Team Bagong Parañaque | Lakas–CMD | 45,639 | 43.28 |
| Shannin Mae M. Olivarez-Bernardo | Team At Your SerVice | Partido Federal ng Pilipinas | 42,446 | 40.25 |
| Maria Guadalupe T. Golez | Team Bagong Parañaque | Lakas–CMD | 41,912 | 39.74 |
| Roberto C. Vasquez | Team At Your SerVice | Independent | 41,858 | 39.69 |
| Joey Delos Santos | Team At Your SerVice | Partido Federal ng Pilipinas | 26,490 | 25.12 |
| Maria Isabel R. Viduya | Team Bagong Parañaque | Lakas–CMD | 25,213 | 23.91 |
| Christian Eric P. Martinez | Team Drew Uy | Independent | 18,376 | 17.42 |
| Melencio R. Santos | Independent | | 16,697 | 15.83 |
| Ariel G. Fernandez | Independent | | 9,265 | 8.79 |
| Razel C. Lagman | Independent | | 8,443 | 8.01 |
| Christopher H. Rivera | Independent | | 7,300 | 6.92 |
| Julius C. Disamburun | Partido Demokratiko Pilipino | | 6,574 | 6.23 |
| Ronald Joseph Catunao | Team At Your SerVice | Partido Federal ng Pilipinas | 5,006 | 4.75 |
| Total | | | 618,030 | 100.00 |

=== Second district ===
The second city council district is composed of the city's eastern barangays, namely BF Homes, Don Bosco, Marcelo Green, Merville, Moonwalk, San Antonio, San Martin de Porres, and Sun Valley.

The last election saw the administration coalition win a supermajority in the district, winning seven out of eight seats.

==== Term-limited ====
- Edwin Benzon
  - His wife, Sheilla Benzon, is running for the position
- Nina Sotto
  - Her husband, Wahoo Sotto, is running for the position

===== Results =====
2025 Parañaque City Council election - District 2
| Candidate | Party or alliance | | Votes | % |
|---|---|---|---|---|
| Jose Enrico T. Golez | Team Bagong Parañaque | Lakas–CMD | 120,222 | 69.54 |
| Maritess B. De Asis | Team At Your SerVice | Partido Federal ng Pilipinas | 112,828 | 65.26 |
| Vincent Kenneth M. Favis | Team At Your SerVice | Independent | 104,712 | 60.57 |
| Jerome Bart M. Frias | Team Bagong Parañaque | Lakas–CMD | 103,389 | 59.80 |
| Viktor Eriko M. Sotto | Team Bagong Parañaque | Nationalist People's Coalition | 93,739 | 54.22 |
| Maria Kristine G. Esplana | Team Bagong Parañaque | Lakas–CMD | 90,177 | 52.16 |
| Shiella G. Benzon | Team Bagong Parañaque | Lakas–CMD | 76,250 | 44.11 |
| John Ryan G. Yllana | Team Bagong Parañaque | Lakas–CMD | 74,658 | 43.19 |
| Florencia N. Amurao | Team Bagong Parañaque | Lakas–CMD | 74,300 | 42.98 |
| Rafael Lito V. Dela Peña | Team Bagong Parañaque | Lakas–CMD | 49,443 | 28.60 |
| Nicolai B. Felix | Independent | | 25,543 | 14.78 |
| Menandro D. Molina | Independent | | 22,616 | 13.08 |
| Glenn J. Manio | Independent | | 18,210 | 10.53 |
| Felix G. Resuello | Independent | | 17,115 | 9.90 |
| Gaspar A. Hachuela | Independent | | 13,766 | 7.96 |
| Dante B. Peolino Jr. | Kilusang Bagong Lipunan | | 10,403 | 6.02 |
| Total | | | 1,007,371 | 100.00 |

== House of Representatives elections ==
Coinciding with the local elections, two representatives will be elected to represent the city in the House of Representatives in the 20th Congress.

=== First district ===
The incumbent representative is Edwin Olivarez, who was elected in 2022 with 90.16% of the vote. He was eligible to run for a second term, but chose to run for mayor instead.

His party chose his brother, incumbent mayor Eric Olivarez to run for the post. He is running unopposed.

==== Results ====
2025 Philippine House of Representatives election in Parañaque's 1st district
| Candidate | Party | Votes | % |
|---|---|---|---|
| Eric Olivarez | Lakas–CMD | 73,351 | 100.00 |
| Total | | 73,351 | 100.00 |
| TBD | | | |

=== Second district ===
The incumbent representative is Gustavo Tambunting, who was elected in 2022 with 52.89% of the vote. He is eligible to run for a second consecutive term.

His main opponent is incumbent Bicol Saro partylist representative Brian Yamsuan.

==== Results ====
2025 Philippine House of Representatives election in Parañaque's 2nd district
| Candidate | Party | Votes | % |
|---|---|---|---|
| Brian Yamsuan | Independent | 82,700 | 50.98 |
| Gustavo Tambunting | National Unity Party | 72,765 | 44.85 |
| Rolando Aguilar | Independent | 3,190 | 1.97 |
| Florentino Baguio | Independent | 1,896 | 1.17 |
| Rodel Espinola | Labor Party Philippines | 1,680 | 1.04 |
| Total | | 162,231 | 100.00 |
| TBD | | | |
