= 2002 Philippines Asian Games basketball team =

- Head coach: Jong Uichico
- 2002 Asian Games: 4th Place

The 2002 Philippines men's Asian Games basketball team, was a Filipino Asian Games team assembled for the basketball competition on 2002 Asian Games.

== Forming the team ==
The formation of the team was started after FIBA lifted suspension on the Philippine basketball on 2001.

Ron Jacobs was re-hired as head coach. His first task was to form a blueprint of a team that can win the gold medal. He form two pool teams coached by his assistants (RP-Selecta, coached by Jong Uichico; and RP-Hapee, coached Allan Caidic). Unfortunately, Jacobs suffered stroke in December 22, 2001. But due to slow recovery, and inability to coach, lead assistant Uichico was tasked to coach the team.

== Roster ==
=== 2002 Asian Games ===
Pos	No.	Player	Height	PBA Team
PG	4	Noy Castillo	6ft 0in	Purefoods Hotdogs
PG	5	Olsen Racela	6ft 0in	San Miguel Beermen
SG/SF	6	Dondon Hontiveros	6ft 2in	San Miguel Beermen
PF	7	Dennis Espino	6ft 6in	Sta. Lucia Realtors
C/PF	8	Mick Pennisi	6ft 9in	Red Bull Barako
PF	9	Eric Menk	6ft 6in	Barangay Ginebra Kings
PF	10	Danny Ildefonso	6ft 6in	San Miguel Beermen
C	11	Andy Seigle	6ft 9in	Purefoods Hotdogs
SF/SG	12	Jeffrey Cariaso	6ft 2in	Coca-Cola Tigers
SF/PF	13	Rudy Hatfield	6ft 3in	Coca-Cola Tigers
C	14	Asi Taulava	6ft 9in	Talk 'N Text Phone Pals
SG/SF	15	Kenneth Duremdes	6ft 3in	Alaska Aces

Head coach: Jong Uichico

Assistant coach(es): Allan Caidic, Eric Altamirano, Binky Favis, Boycie Zamar, Beaujing Acot, Nash Racela, Juno Sauler, JP Pacheco

== Asian Games results ==
All times are Korea Standard Time (UTC+09:00)

=== Preliminary round ===
==== Group C ====
Pos	Team	Pld	W	L	PF	PA	PD	Pts	Qualification
1	Philippines	2	2	0	170	119	+51	4	Quarterfinals
2	North Korea	2	1	1	148	153	−5	3	Quarterfinals
3	United Arab Emirates	2	0	2	120	166	−46	2	9~12 placing

Source: Results

28 September
15:00

Philippines	81–56	United Arab Emirates
Scoring by quarter: 19–19, 28–9, 16–13, 18–15
Pts: Castillo 14; Rebs: Taulava 14; Asts: Hontiveros, Cariaso 2		Pts: I. Mohamed 12; Rebs: Ahmed 6 Asts: J. Salem 2

Geumjeong Gymnasium, Busan

30 September
17:00

North Korea	63–89	Philippines
Scoring by quarter: 15–19, 16–30, 15–13, 17–27
Pts: Pak C.J. 20; Rebs: Ri M.H. 9 Asts: Pak C.J. 3		Pts: Duremdes 21; Rebs: Taulava 15; Asts: Racela 5

Geumjeong Gymnasium, Busan

=== Quarterfinals ===
==== Group I ====
Pos	Team	Pld	W	L	PF	PA	PD	Pts	Qualification
1	China	3	3	0	309	160	+149	6	Semifinals
2	Philippines	3	2	1	213	235	−22	5	Semifinals
3	Japan	3	1	2	220	260	−40	4	5/6 placing
4	Chinese Taipei	3	0	3	196	283	−87	3	7/8 placing

Source: Results

2 October
17:00

Philippines	79–74	Japan
Scoring by quarter: 17–13, 17–27, 18–18, 27–16
Pts: Taulava 27; Rebs: Taulava 12; Asts: Ildefonso, Cariaso 1		Pts: Orimo 33; Rebs: Takahashi 9 Asts: Setsumasa, Orimo 2

Geumjeong Gymnasium, Busan

4 October
13:00

Chinese Taipei	69–83	Philippines
Scoring by quarter: 15–21, 19–22, 8–19, 27–21
Pts: Chiu C.Y. 19; Rebs: Tien L. 11; Asts: four players 1		Pts: Taulava 18; Rebs: Menk 11; Asts: Duremdes 3

Geumjeong Gymnasium, Busan

8 October
19:00

China	92–51	Philippines
Scoring by quarter: 19–10, 19–11, 33–12, 21–18
Pts: Hu W.D. 20; Rebs: Gong X.B., Liu Y.D., Mengke B. 6 Asts: Liu W., Hu W.D. 2		Pts: Espino 7 Rebs: Ildefonso 5 Asts: Hatfield 2

Geumjeong Gymnasium, Busan

=== Final round ===
Semifinals
12 October
South Korea	69
Philippines	68
12 October
China	131
Kazakhstan	62

Final
14 October
South Korea (OT)	102
China	100
3/4 placing
13 October
Philippines	66
Kazakhstan	68

==== Semifinals ====
Due to a Lee Sang-min three point-shot, the Philippines lost the chance to enter Gold Medal game/Finals.

12 October
15:00

South Korea	69–68	Philippines
Scoring by quarter: 15–23, 21–11, 22–18, 11–16
Pts: Moon K.E. 18; Rebs: Seo J.H. 8 Asts: Lee S.M. 4		Pts: Racela 14; Rebs: Menk 12; Asts: Hontiveros 2

Sajik Arena, Busan

==== Bronze Medal game ====
13 October
17:00

Philippines	66–68	Kazakhstan
Scoring by quarter: 22–16, 15–21, 15–17, 14–14
Pts: Cariaso 18; Rebs: Taulava 17; Asts: Racela 3		Pts: Strebkov 30; Rebs: Vdovin 10; Asts: Issakov, Vdovin 1

Sajik Arena, Busan

== Aftermath ==
The team was considered as the worst sports disappointment in the history of the Philippine sports, as the team didn't won any medal. The Philippines suffered another suspension from 2005 to 2007, so the result was the team unable to field player for 2006 Doha Asian Games.

The Philippines only won again a basketball medal in 2022 Asian Games (which is a gold).
