= 1999 Letran Knights men's basketball team =

Basketball team in the Philippines

1999 Letran Knights men's basketball

NCAA Season 75 champions

Record
- Elims rank: #4
- Final rank: #1
- 1999 record: 12-5 (9-5 elims)
- Head coach: Binky Favis (1st season)
- Captain: Kerby Raymundo (3rd season)

The 1999 Letran Knights men's basketball team represented Colegio de San Juan de Letran in the 75th season of the National Collegiate Athletic Association in the Philippines. The men's basketball tournament for the school year 1999-2000 began on July 17, 1999, and the host school for the season is José Rizal College.

The Knights, the NCAA Season 74 champions, finished the elimination round at fourth place with 9 wins and 5 losses. In the Final Four, the Knights forced a rubber match by beating the top-seeded San Sebastian Stags in the first game. They won again in the second game to enter the Finals and face the hosts, the JRC Heavy Bombers.

In Game 1, Kerby Raymundo forced Ariel Capus to throw up an airball, which led to Aldin Ayo scoring on a lay-up and gave the Knights the victory.

On the next game, Letran again started well, erecting a 13–2 lead early in the first half. JRC cut the lead down to four at 13–9, but the Knights then had another 27–11 run; Letran eventually had a 44–26 lead at halftime. At halftime, fracas ensued when Letran supporters rained debris on JRC cheerleaders, causing the game to be delayed by an hour. JRC never got close in the second half. With 3 minutes remaining, and with Letran leading 83–60, Letran's John Prior elbowed John Dale Valeña in the face, in front of the JRC bench. Valeña then threw a punch on Prior at the nape, then the JRC supporters rained debris on the court, causing the game to be delayed again. JRC coach Boy de Vera wanted to finish the game, but was overruled by JRC officials, conceding the game to Letran. Kerby Raymundo was named Season Most Valuable Player and Finals Most Valuable Player, while Orlan Tama bagged the Most Improved Player award.

== Coaching changes ==
After winning the championship in Season 74, Louie Alas left the team to coach the Philippines men's national basketball team in the 1999 SEA Games in Brunei and the Manila Metrostars in the Metropolitan Basketball Association. He was replaced by Binky Favis.

== Roster changes ==
Both Erwin Velez and Chris Calaguio used up their eligibility and graduated in college. Chis Calaguio, the Season 74 MVP, then signed with the San Juan Knights in the Metropolitan Basketball Association.

=== Departures ===
Pos.	Nat.	Name	Notes
G	(Philippines)	Chris Calaguio	Graduated
F	(Philippines)	Erwin Velez	Graduated

== Roster ==
Letran Knights roster
Players
Coaches

Pos.	No.	Nat.	Name	Height	Year	High School
G		(Philippines)	Ayo, Aldin V.	–	–	Our Lady of Peñafrancia Seminary
		(Philippines)	Bernal, Marlon	–	–	–
		(Philippines)	Lee, Edgar Joseph	–	–	–
		(Philippines)	Lim, Anthony	–	–	Colegio de San Juan de Letran
		(Philippines)	Misolas, Jason	–	–	–
		(Philippines)	Moody, William	–	–	Tondo High School
G		(Philippines)	Pacheco, Jose Nicholas	–	–	Colegio de San Juan de Letran
		(Philippines)	Prior, John Paul	–	–	–
		(Philippines)	Salangsang, Joseph Allan	–	–	–
		(Philippines)	Soriano, Marcelino	–	–	–
C		(Philippines)	Tama, Orlan K.	–	–	Remedios National High School Lubao
F		(Philippines)	Reyes, Kristoffer Alriches	–	–	–
C		(Philippines)	Raymundo, Kerby M. (C)	–	–	Jose Rizal Institute Orion

Head coach

- Vincent Kenneth Favis

Team manager

- Ramon Oben

Legend

- (C) Team captain
- Injured
