= Mayor of Parañaque =

Head of local government of Parañaque, Metro Manila, Philippines

- Punong Lungsod ng Parañaque
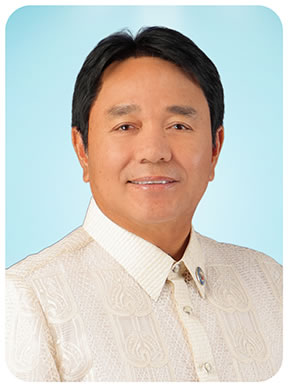
- Incumbent; Edwin L. Olivarez since June 30, 2025
- Seat: Parañaque City Hall
- Appointer: Elected via popular vote
- Term length: 3 years
- Inaugural holder: Santiago Garcia
- Formation: 1897

The Mayor of Parañaque (Filipino: Punong Lungsod ng Parañaque) is the chief executive of the government of Parañaque in Metro Manila, Philippines. The mayor leads the city's departments in executing ordinances and delivering public services. The mayorship is a three-year term and each mayor is restricted to three consecutive terms, totaling nine years, although a mayor can be elected again after an interruption of one term.

The current mayor of Parañaque is Edwin Olivarez.

== List ==
No.	Portrait	Name	Term	Party	Deputy (Vice Mayor)
Municipal President of Parañaque
1		Santiago Garcia	1897–1898	Unknown	
2		Timoteo Bernabe	1898–1899	Unknown	
3		Maximo Rodriguez	1900–1901	Unknown	
4		Patricio Bernabe	1902–1903	Unknown	
5		Valentino de Leon	1904–1908	Unknown	
6		Flaviano Rodriguez	1908–1912	Federalista	
7		Nicanor Mayuga	1912–1915	Nacionalista	
*		Bernabe Lorenzo	1915^{[a]}	Unknown	
8		Francisco A. Cruz	1916	Unknown	
9		Andres Buenaventura	1916–1922	Unknown	
10		Victor Medina	1922–1925	Unknown	
11		Juan Gabriel	1925–1928	Unknown	
12		Olympic Peña	1931	Unknown	
13		Sabas de Guzman	1931–1934	Nacionalista	Jose Loya
14		Francis Gabriel	1934–1937	Unknown	Nicanor Cruz
Mayor of the City of Greater Manila which included Parañaque
*		Jorge B. Vargas	1941–1942	KALIBAPI	
*		León Guinto	1942–1944	KALIBAPI	
Municipal Mayor of Parañaque
15		Lucio Francisco	1945	Unknown	
16		Sixto Clemente	1945	Unknown	
17		Laureano Capistrano	1945	Unknown	
18		Nicanor F. Cruz	1946–1955	Unknown	
19		Eleuterio de Leon	1956–1964	Unknown	
20		Florencio Bernabe Sr.	1964–1986	Nacionalista	Servillano Salazar (1964–1967); Bienvenido A. Galang (1968–1971)
20		Florencio Bernabe Sr.	1964–1986	KBL	Servillano Salazar (1964–1967); Bienvenido A. Galang (1968–1971)
*		Rodolfo Buenavista	1986–December 4, 1987^{[a]}	Unknown	
*		Rodolfo Punzalan	December 5, 1987 – February 2, 1988^{[a]}	Unknown	
21		Walfrido N. Ferrer	February 2, 1988 – June 30, 1992	PDP–Laban	
22		Pablo Olivarez	June 30, 1992 – June 30, 1995	Liberal	Joselito "Joey" Marquez
23		Joselito "Joey" Marquez	June 30, 1995 – February 15, 1998	Lakas	Tomas "Jun" Banaga Jr.
City Mayor of Parañaque
(23)		Joselito "Joey" Marquez	February 15, 1998 – June 30, 2004	Lakas	Tomas "Jun" Banaga Jr. (1998); Florencio "Jun" Bernabe Jr. (1998–2004)
24		Florencio "Jun" Bernabe Jr.	June 30, 2004 – June 30, 2013	Lakas	Andres Jose "Anjo" Yllana (2004–2007); Gustavo "Gus" Tambunting (2007–2013)
25		Edwin Olivarez	June 30, 2013 – June 30, 2022	Liberal	Jose Enrico "Rico" Golez
25		Edwin Olivarez	June 30, 2013 – June 30, 2022	PDP–Laban	Jose Enrico "Rico" Golez
26		Eric Olivarez	June 30, 2022 – June 30, 2025	PDP–Laban	Joan Villafuerte
26		Eric Olivarez	June 30, 2022 – June 30, 2025	Lakas	Joan Villafuerte
27		Edwin Olivarez	June 30, 2025 – Present	Lakas	Florencio "Benjo" C. Bernabe III

^{a} Served in acting capacity.
