= 2022 Parañaque local elections =

Philippine election

2022 Parañaque mayoral elections
- May 9, 2022
| Nominee | Eric Olivarez | Julius Anthony "Jun" Zaide | Gherardo "Bishop Jherie" Mores |
| Party | PDP–Laban | KBL | PDDS |
| Running mate | Vincent Kenneth "Binky" Favis | N/A | Maritess "Tess" De Asis |
| Popular vote | 174,816 | 64,263 | 1,300 |
| Percentage | 64.30% | 23.64% | 0.48% |
| Nominee | N/A |
| Party | Liberal |
| Running mate | Joan Villafuerte-Densing |
Mayor before election
Edwin Olivarez
PDP–Laban
Elected mayor
Eric Olivarez
PDP–Laban

Local elections took place in Parañaque on May 9, 2022, within the 2022 Philippine general election. Voters will elect for the elective local posts in the city: the mayor, vice mayor, two congressmen, and the 16 councilors, eight each in the two local legislative districts of Parañaque.

== Background ==
Mayor Edwin Olivarez was on third and final term. He ran as representative of city's first district, switched places with his brother, First District Representative Eric Olivarez, was also on third and final term. Olivarez was challenged by Baclaran Barangay Captain Julius Anthony "Jun" Zaide, who broke the long time rule of the Cailles family (Olivarez's allies) in Barangay Baclaran, as well as Kainos Breed Fellowship International founder Gerardo "Bishop Jherie" Mores and independents Rolando Aguilar and John Andrew Uy.

Vice Mayor Jose Enrico "Rico" Golez was on third and final term. He ran as councilor of the second district. His sister Guada Golez was initially named to run in his place, but his party later nominated Second District Councilor Vincent Kenneth "Binky" Favis. Favis faced his fellow councilors, Joan Villafuerte-Densing and Maritess "Tess" de Asis from first and second district respectively.

First District Representative Eric Olivarez was term-limited and instead ran for mayor. His brother, Mayor Edwin Olivarez, switched places with him and was nominated by his party. Olivarez was challenged by Jayson Moral and Pedro "Pete" Montaño.

Second District Representative Myra Joy Tambunting chose not to run for re-election. Her husband, former Representative Gustavo "Gus" Tambunting, ran in her place. Tambunting was challenged by Josef Maganduga.

== Candidates ==
=== Administration coalition ===
Team Bagong Parañaque
| # | Name | Party |
For Mayor
| 3. | Eric Olivarez | PDP–Laban |
For Vice Mayor
| 2. | Binky Favis | PDP–Laban |
For House Of Representatives (1st District)
| 3. | Edwin Olivarez | PDP–Laban |
For House Of Representatives (2nd District)
| 3. | Gustavo Tambunting | NUP |
For Councilor (1st District)
| 1. | Daniel Eric Baes | PDP–Laban |
| 5. | Pablo Gabriel Jr. | PDP–Laban |
| 11. | Paolo Olivarez | PDP–Laban |
| 12. | Vandolph Quizon | PDP–Laban |
| 15. | Marvin Santos | Lakas |
| 16. | Allen Ford Tan | PDP–Laban |
| 17. | Rene Velarde | PDP–Laban |
| 18. | Jomari Yllana | PDP–Laban |
For Councilor (2nd District)
| 1. | Florencia Amurao | PDP–Laban |
| 9. | Edwin Benzon | PDP–Laban |
| 17. | Maria Kristine Esplana | PDP–Laban |
| 18. | Jerome Bart Frias | PDP–Laban |
| 20. | Rico Golez | LDP |
| 22. | Rolando Mendoza | PDP–Laban |
| 24. | Nina Celine Sotto | NPC |
| 27. | John Ryan Yllana | PDP–Laban |

=== Other coalitions ===
Team Blessed Parañaque
| # | Name | Party |
For Mayor
| 2. | Gherardo Mores | PDDS |
For Vice Mayor
| 1. | Maritess De Asis | PDDS |
For Councilor (1st District)
| 7. | Edelyn Ison | PDDS |
For Councilor (2nd District)
| 12. | Jerome De Asis | PDDS |
| 23. | Menandro Molina | PDDS |

Team Bagong Pag-asa
| # | Name | Party |
For Vice Mayor
| 3. | Joan Villafuerte-Densing | Liberal |
For House Of Representatives (2nd District)
| 1. | Josef Maganduga | Samahang Kaagapay ng Agilang Pilipino |
For Councilor (1st District)
| 6. | Bok Inciong | Aksyon |
For Councilor (2nd District)
| 6. | Rudy Avila | Independent |
| 7. | JB Balicanta | PRP |
| 15. | Jaymee Dela Rosa | Aksyon |
| 16. | Bai Elorde | PROMDI |

Kilusang Bagong Lipunan coalition
| # | Name | Party |
For Mayor
| 5. | Jun Zaide | KBL |
For Councilor (2nd District)
| 11. | Reynaldo Casanova | KBL |
| 13. | Steve Jon Dela Cruz | KBL |

Lakas-CMD coalition
| # | Name | Party |
For Councilor (2nd District)
| 2. | Carlito Antipuesto Jr. | Lakas |
| 4. | Ireneo Aquino | Lakas |

=== Other parties ===
Aksyon Demokratiko
| # | Name | Party |
For House Of Representatives (1st District)
| 2. | Jayson Moral | Aksyon |

Progressive Movement for the Devolution of Initiatives
| # | Name | Party |
For Councilor (1st District)
| 3. | Ramon Clint Calinisan Jr. | PROMDI |

Bigkis Pinoy
| # | Name | Party |
For Councilor (2nd District)
| 5. | Yolanda Arandia | Bigkis |

=== Independents ===
Independent
| # | Name | Party |
For House Of Representatives (1st District)
| 1. | Pete Montaño | Independent |
For Mayor
| 1. | Rolando Aguilar | Independent |
| 4. | John Andrew Uy | Independent |
For Councilor (1st District)
| 2. | Arlene Besa | Independent |
| 4. | Francisco Dela Cruz | Independent |
| 8. | Razel Lagman | Independent |
| 9. | Felix Lazaro Jr. | Independent |
| 10. | Jaime Nery Jr. | Independent |
| 14. | Manuel Narciso Raymundo | Independent |
| 15. | Sean Anthony Sanciego | Independent |
For Councilor (2nd District)
| 3. | Lucresio Apostol | Independent |
| 8. | Marlon Batoon | Independent |
| 10. | Maria Severina Cadano | Independent |
| 14. | Rafael Lito Dela Peña | Independent |
| 19. | Anthony Gabriel | Independent |
| 21. | Gaspar Hachuela | Independent |
| 25. | Maria Eliza Sumaribus | Independent |
| 26. | Anthony Viviero | Independent |

== Results ==
Names written in bold-Italic are the re-elected incumbents while in italic are incumbents lost in elections.

=== For Mayor ===
First District Rep. Eric Olivarez defeated his closest rival, Barangay Baclaran Chairman Julius Anthony "Jun" Zaide.

Parañaque Mayoralty Election
| Party | Candidate | Votes | % |
|---|---|---|---|
| **PDP–Laban** | **Eric Olivarez** | **174,816** | **64.30** |
| KBL | Julius Anthony "Jun" Zaide | 64,263 | 23.64 |
| Independent | John Andrew Uy | 27,055 | 9.95 |
| Independent | Rolando Aguilar | 4,448 | 1.64 |
| PDDS | Gherardo "Bishop Jherie" Mores | 1,300 | 0.48 |
| **Total votes** | | **271,882** | **100.00** |
| PDP–Laban **hold** | | | |

Popular vote percentage
| **Olivarez** | 64.30% |
| Zaide | 23.64% |
| Uy | 9.95% |
| Aguilar | 1.64% |
| Mores | 0.48% |

=== For Vice Mayor ===
First District Councilor Joan Villafuerte-Densing defeated her fellow councilors Vincent Kenneth "Coach Binky" Favis and Maritess "Tess" De Asis.

Parañaque Vice Mayoralty Election
| Party | Candidate | Votes | % |
|---|---|---|---|
| **Liberal** | **Joan Villafuerte-Densing** | **102,760** | **39.14** |
| PDP–Laban | Vincent Kenneth "Coach Binky" Favis | 89,131 | 33.95 |
| PDDS | Maritess "Tess" De Asis | 70,661 | 26.91 |
| **Total votes** | | **262,552** | **100.00** |
| Liberal **gain** from LDP | | | |

Popular vote percentage
| **Villafuerte-Densing** | 39.14% |
| Favis | 33.95% |
| De Asis | 26.91% |

=== For Representative ===
==== First District ====
Mayor Edwin Olivarez defeated his opponents Jayson Moral and Pedro Montaño.

Congressional Elections in Parañaque's First District
| Party | Candidate | Votes | % |
|---|---|---|---|
| **PDP–Laban** | **Edwin Olivarez** | **91,241** | **90.16** |
| Aksyon | Jayson Moral | 5,662 | 5.60 |
| Independent | Pedro Montaño | 4,292 | 4.24 |
| **Total votes** | | **101,195** | **100.00** |
| PDP–Laban **hold** | | | |

Popular vote percentage
| **Olivarez** | 90.16% |
| Moral | 5.60% |
| Montaño | 4.24% |

==== Second District ====
Former Representative Gustavo "Gus" Tambunting, defeated his closest rival Atty. Josef Maganduga by a thin margin.

Congressional Elections in Parañaque's Second District
| Party | Candidate | Votes | % |
|---|---|---|---|
| **NUP** | **Gustavo "Gus" Tambunting** | **82,357** | **52.89** |
| Samahang Kaagapay ng Agilang Pilipino | Josef Maganduga | 73,346 | 47.11 |
| **Total votes** | | **155,703** | **100.00** |
| NUP **gain** from AGILA | | | |

Popular vote percentage
| **Tambunting** | 52.89% |
| Maganduga | 47.11% |

=== City Council Elections ===
| Party or alliance | | Votes | % | Seats |
|---|---|---|---|---|
| Team Bagong Paranaque | PDP-Laban | 809,558 | 45.76 | 11 |
| Team Bagong Paranaque | Lakas | 139,881 | 7.91 | 1 |
| Team Bagong Paranaque | LDP | 104,798 | 5.92 | 1 |
| Team Bagong Paranaque | NPC | 84,019 | 4.75 | 1 |
| Team Bagong Paranaque | Total | 1,138,256 | 64.34 | 14 |
| Team Bagong Pag-asa | Aksyon | 94,796 | 5.36 | 1 |
| Team Bagong Pag-asa | PROMDI | 46,774 | 2.64 | – |
| Team Bagong Pag-asa | PRP | 18,363 | 1.04 | – |
| Team Bagong Pag-asa | Independent | 39,322 | 2.22 | – |
| Team Bagong Pag-asa | Total | 199,255 | 11.26 | 1 |
| PDDS | | 53,626 | 3.03 | – |
| KBL | | 34,410 | 1.94 | – |
| PROMDI | | 20,880 | 1.18 | – |
| Bigkis | | 17,383 | 0.98 | – |
| Independent | | 305,361 | 17.26 | 1 |
| Ex officio seats | | | | 2 |
| **Total** | | **1,769,171** | **100.00** | **18** |

==== First District ====
City Council Elections in Parañaque's First District
| Party | Candidate | Votes | % |
|---|---|---|---|
| **PDP–Laban** | **Pablo "Paolo" Olivarez II** | **76,138** | **67.06** |
| **PDP–Laban** | **Allen Ford Tan** | **68,286** | **60.14** |
| **PDP–Laban** | **Pablo Gabriel Jr.** | **67,511** | **59.46** |
| **PDP–Laban** | **Daniel Eric Baes** | **65,748** | **57.91** |
| **Lakas** | **Marvin Santos** | **64,048** | **56.41** |
| **PDP–Laban** | **Vandolph Quizon** | **62,437** | **54.99** |
| **Aksyon** | **Brillante "Bok" Inciong** | **54,137** | **47.68** |
| **PDP–Laban** | **Jose Maria "Jomari" Yllana** | **52,265** | **46.03** |
| Independent | Francisco Dela Cruz | 31,732 | 27.95 |
| PDP–Laban | Rene Velarde | 29,744 | 26.20 |
| Independent | Jaime Nery Jr. | 23,131 | 20.37 |
| PROMDI | Ramon Clint Calinisan Jr. | 20,880 | 18.39 |
| Independent | Arlene Besa | 16,881 | 14.87 |
| Independent | Sean Anthony Sanciego | 15,917 | 14.02 |
| Independent | Manuel Narciso Raymundo | 10,976 | 9.67 |
| Independent | Razel Lagman | 10,534 | 9.28 |
| PDDS | Edelyn Ison | 10,387 | 9.15 |
| Independent | Felix Lazaro Jr. | 10,309 | 9.08 |
| **Total votes** | | **691,061** | **100.00** |

| Party or alliance | | Votes | % | Seats |
|---|---|---|---|---|
| Team Bagong Paranaque | Partido Demokratiko Pilipino-Lakas ng Bayan | 422,129 | 61.08 | 6 |
| Team Bagong Paranaque | Lakas-CMD | 64,048 | 9.27 | 1 |
| Team Bagong Paranaque | Total | 486,177 | 70.35 | 7 |
| Aksyon Demokratiko | | 54,137 | 7.83 | 1 |
| Progressive Movement for the Devolution of Initiatives | | 20,880 | 3.02 | – |
| Pederalismo ng Dugong Dakilang Samahan | | 10,387 | 1.50 | – |
| Independent | | 119,480 | 17.29 | – |
| **Total** | | **691,061** | **100.00** | **8** |

==== Second District ====
City Council Elections in Parañaque's Second District
| Party | Candidate | Votes | % |
|---|---|---|---|
| **LDP** | **Jose Enrico "Rico" Golez** | **104,798** | **60.96** |
| **NPC** | **Nina Celine Sotto** | **84,019** | **48.88** |
| **PDP–Laban** | **Maria Kristine Esplana** | **75,739** | **44.06** |
| **PDP–Laban** | **Edwin "Bong" Benzon** | **75,387** | **43.86** |
| **PDP–Laban** | **John Ryan Yllana** | **69,530** | **40.45** |
| **PDP–Laban** | **Jerome Bart Frias** | **62,429** | **36.32** |
| **PDP–Laban** | **Florencia "Beng" Amurao** | **61,329** | **35.68** |
| **Independent** | **Rafael Lito Dela Peña** | **60,817** | **35.38** |
| Lakas | Carlito Antipuesto Jr. | 54,907 | 31.94 |
| PROMDI | Bai Elorde | 46,774 | 27.21 |
| PDP–Laban | Rolando Joaquin Mendoza | 43,015 | 25.02 |
| Aksyon | Jaymee Dela Rosa | 40,659 | 23.65 |
| Independent | Rudy Avila | 39,322 | 22.88 |
| PDDS | Jerome De Asis | 36,077 | 20.99 |
| Independent | Maria Severina Cadano | 32,145 | 18.70 |
| KBL | Reynaldo Casanova | 29,836 | 17.36 |
| Lakas | Ireneo Aquino | 20,926 | 12.17 |
| PRP | Jose Mari Balicanta | 18,363 | 10.68 |
| Bigkis | Yolanda Arandia | 17,383 | 10.11 |
| Independent | Marlon Batoon | 13,346 | 7.76 |
| Independent | Anthony Viviero | 12,342 | 7.18 |
| Independent | Lucresio Apostol | 8,668 | 5.04 |
| Independent | Anthony Gabriel | 7,565 | 4.40 |
| PDDS | Menandro Molina | 7,162 | 4.17 |
| Independent | Gaspar Hachuela | 6,473 | 3.77 |
| Independent | Maria Eliza Sumaribus | 5,203 | 3.03 |
| KBL | Steve Jon Dela Cruz | 4,574 | 2.66 |
| **Total votes** | | **1,038,788** | **100.00** |

| Party or alliance | | Votes | % | Seats |
|---|---|---|---|---|
| Team Bagong Paranaque | Partido Demokratiko Pilipino-Lakas ng Bayan | 387,429 | 37.30 | 5 |
| Team Bagong Paranaque | Laban ng Demokratikong Pilipino | 104,798 | 10.09 | 1 |
| Team Bagong Paranaque | Nationalist People's Coalition | 84,019 | 8.09 | 1 |
| Team Bagong Paranaque | Total | 576,246 | 55.47 | 7 |
| Team Bagong Pag-asa | Progressive Movement for the Devolution of Initiatives | 46,774 | 4.50 | – |
| Team Bagong Pag-asa | Aksyon Demokratiko | 40,659 | 3.91 | – |
| Team Bagong Pag-asa | People's Reform Party | 18,363 | 1.77 | – |
| Team Bagong Pag-asa | Independent | 39,322 | 3.79 | – |
| Team Bagong Pag-asa | Total | 145,118 | 13.97 | – |
| Lakas–CMD | | 75,833 | 7.30 | – |
| Pederalismo ng Dugong Dakilang Samahan | | 43,239 | 4.16 | – |
| Kilusang Bagong Lipunan | | 34,410 | 3.31 | – |
| Bigkis Pinoy | | 17,383 | 1.67 | – |
| Independent | | 146,559 | 14.11 | 1 |
| **Total** | | **1,038,788** | **100.00** | **8** |
