= Basketball at the 2002 Asian Games – Men's tournament =

Men at the 2002 Asian Games
- Venue: Geumjeong Gymnasium; Sajik Arena
- Date: 28 September – 14 October 2002
- Competitors: 141 from 12 nations

Medalists
gold medal	South Korea
silver medal	China
bronze medal	Kazakhstan

Men's basketball at the 2002 Asian Games was held in Geumjeong Gymnasium and Sajik Arena, Busan from September 28 to October 14, 2002.

== Squads ==
China	Chinese Taipei	Hong Kong	Japan
Guo Shiqiang; Liu Wei; Gong Xiaobin; Zhang Cheng; Hu Weidong; Chen Ke; Li Nan; Liu Yudong; Zhu Fangyu; Yao Ming; Mengke Bateer; Du Feng	Lee Chih-ming; Chen Chih-chung; Yang Yu-ming; Wu Tai-hao; Chou Hung-yu; Chiu Chi-yi; Ho Shou-cheng; Lee Chi-yi; Chou Shih-yuan; Tien Lei; Wu Chih-wei; Tseng Wen-ting	Siu Kim Wing; Yung Man Tak; Chung Ming Tat; Yung Kam Wah; Li Wai Lun; Lui Chor Wai; Wu Kwok Fung; Poon Chi Ho; Ng Wah Fung; Mike Heung; Yu Hing Hoi; Tam Wai Yeung	Shunsuke Ito; Takashi Shinohara; Hidekazu Ishizaka; Takuya Kita; Takahiro Setsumasa; Takehiko Orimo; Atsushi Ono; Yuichi Kan; Takuma Watanabe; Satoru Furuta; Keishi Handa; Maikeru Takahashi
Kazakhstan	Kuwait	Mongolia	North Korea
Roman Muravyov; Fedor Zakharchenko; Alexey Yeropkin; Vitaliy Lopatin; Alexandr Yemelyanov; Mikhail Dedov; Yevgeniy Issakov; Sergey Vdovin; Vitaliy Strebkov; Yevgeniy Ovsyannikov; Alexandr Derbush; Boris Tikhonenko	Fahad Al-Mutairi; Saqer Abdulredha; Sulaiman Al-Tabakh; Abdullah Al-Sarraf; Haitham Baroun; Yahya Al-Bahar; Ahmad Al-Mutairi; Khaled Salem; Abdullah Al-Ruwayeh; Hamad Al-Shammari; Mohammad Baqer; Osamah Farhan	Magnaidorjiin Otgonbayar; Dorjgotovyn Pürevdorj; Jamsranjavyn Otgondari; Shiinengiin Sedbazar; Davakhüügiin Erkhembayar; Erdenebilegiin Ganbayar; Choijamtsyn Mönkh-Od; Mönkhbatyn Tsogtbaatar; Undarmaagiin Orgil	Kim Kwang-il; O Myong-ho; Pak Kyong-nam; Ri Jun-hyok; Pak In-chol; Pyo Hyon-chol; Mun Kwang-il; Jang Myong-jin; Pak Chon-jong; Jo Chol-yon; Kim Myong-bom; Ri Myung-hun
Philippines	Qatar	South Korea	United Arab Emirates
Noy Castillo; Olsen Racela; Dondon Hontiveros; Dennis Espino; Mick Pennisi; Eric Menk; Danny Ildefonso; Andy Seigle; Jeffrey Cariaso; Rudy Hatfield; Asi Taulava; Kenneth Duremdes	Khalid Masoud; Baker Abdulla; Ahmed Ghanim; Daoud Musa; Baker Ahmad; Ahmed Mahmoud; Yasseen Ismail; Mohammed Orabi; Hussam Omer; Abubaker Mohammed; Hashim Zaidan; Mohammed Saleem	Choo Seung-gyun; Shin Ki-sung; Kim Seung-hyun; Cho Sang-hyun; Lee Kyu-sup; Hyun Joo-yup; Moon Kyung-eun; Seo Jang-hoon; Bang Sung-yoon; Chun Hee-chul; Lee Sang-min; Kim Joo-sung	Saeed Salem; Salem Mubarak; Nasser Saeed; Ibrahim Mohamed; Ibrahim Khalfan; Ayoub Ahmed; Khalifa Katoot; Qasem Mohamed; Salem Obaid; Jassem Salem; Hisham Salem; Abdullateef Abdulla

== Results ==
All times are Korea Standard Time (UTC+09:00)

=== Preliminary round ===
==== Group A ====
Pos	Team	Pld	W	L	PF	PA	PD	Pts	Qualification
1	China	2	2	0	190	83	+107	4	Quarterfinals
2	Hong Kong	2	1	1	115	169	−54	3	Quarterfinals
3	Kuwait	2	0	2	102	155	−53	2	9~12 placing

Source: Results

28 September
13:00

China	78–45	Kuwait
Scoring by quarter: 18–11, 24–6, 19–7, 17–21
Pts: Yao 15; Rebs: Yao 13; Asts: Hu 4		Pts: Baroun 8 Rebs: Salem 8 Asts: Farhan 2

Geumjeong Gymnasium, Busan

29 September
13:00

Kuwait	57–77	Hong Kong
Scoring by quarter: 13–20, 13–19, 16–13, 15–25
Pts: Al-Shammari 13; Rebs: Al-Tabakh 9 Asts: Farhan 2		Pts: Poon 21; Rebs: Tam 9 Asts: Poon 4

Geumjeong Gymnasium, Busan

30 September
19:00

Hong Kong	38–112	China
Scoring by quarter: 9–28, 9–19, 14–26, 6–39
Pts: Li 7 Rebs: Tam 7 Asts: Li 2		Pts: Zhu 24; Rebs: Yao 8 Asts: Gong 2

Geumjeong Gymnasium, Busan

==== Group B ====
Pos	Team	Pld	W	L	PF	PA	PD	Pts	Qualification
1	South Korea	2	2	0	224	127	+97	4	Quarterfinals
2	Japan	2	1	1	187	154	+33	3	Quarterfinals
3	Mongolia	2	0	2	140	270	−130	2	9~12 placing

Source: Results

28 September
19:00

South Korea	145–65	Mongolia
Scoring by quarter: 44–13, 32–14, 29–23, 40–15
Pts: Moon 24; Rebs: Hyun 10; Asts: Lee S. 7		Pts: Erkhembayar 17; Rebs: Erkhembayar 11; Asts: Otgonbayar, Orgil 1

Geumjeong Gymnasium, Busan

29 September
19:00

Mongolia	75–125	Japan
Scoring by quarter: 18–33, 10–29, 26–31, 21–32
Pts: Otgonbayar 28; Rebs: Erkhembayar 8 Asts: Otgonbayar 2		Pts: Ito 20; Rebs: Furuta 9 Asts: Watanabe, Handa 5

Geumjeong Gymnasium, Busan

30 September
15:00

Japan	62–79	South Korea
Scoring by quarter: 23–20, 14–15, 14–21, 11–23
Pts: Kita 19; Rebs: Furuta 8 Asts: Furuta 2		Pts: Moon 26; Rebs: Chun 6 Asts: Lee S. 9

Geumjeong Gymnasium, Busan

==== Group C ====
Pos	Team	Pld	W	L	PF	PA	PD	Pts	Qualification
1	Philippines	2	2	0	170	119	+51	4	Quarterfinals
2	North Korea	2	1	1	148	153	−5	3	Quarterfinals
3	United Arab Emirates	2	0	2	120	166	−46	2	9~12 placing

Source: Results

28 September
15:00

Philippines	81–56	United Arab Emirates
Scoring by quarter: 19–19, 28–9, 16–13, 18–15
Pts: Castillo 14; Rebs: Taulava 14; Asts: Hontiveros, Cariaso 2		Pts: I. Mohamed 12; Rebs: Ahmed 6 Asts: J. Salem 2

Geumjeong Gymnasium, Busan

29 September
17:00

United Arab Emirates	64–85	North Korea
Scoring by quarter: 14–28, 19–21, 22–16, 9–20
Pts: Mubarak, Khalfan 14; Rebs: Mubarak 7 Asts: S. Salem 9		Pts: Pak C. 30; Rebs: Ri M. 17; Asts: Pak C. 5

Geumjeong Gymnasium, Busan

30 September
17:00

North Korea	63–89	Philippines
Scoring by quarter: 15–19, 16–30, 15–13, 17–27
Pts: Pak C. 20; Rebs: Ri M. 9 Asts: Pak C. 3		Pts: Duremdes 21; Rebs: Taulava 15; Asts: Racela 5

Geumjeong Gymnasium, Busan

==== Group D ====
Pos	Team	Pld	W	L	PF	PA	PD	Pts	Qualification
1	Kazakhstan	2	1	1	143	133	+10	3 (Note: Tied on head-to-head wins (1). Head-to-head game points average: KAZ 1.075, TPE 0.993, QAT 0.930.)	Quarterfinals
2	Chinese Taipei	2	1	1	146	147	−1	3	Quarterfinals
3	Qatar	2	1	1	119	128	−9	3	9~12 placing

Source: Results
Notes:

28 September
17:00

Kazakhstan	57–58	Qatar
Scoring by quarter: 14–15, 19–15, 7–12, 17–16
Pts: Strebkov 15; Rebs: Tikhonenko 13; Asts: Tikhonenko 4		Pts: Ismail 29; Rebs: Musa 13; Asts: Musa 4

Geumjeong Gymnasium, Busan

29 September
15:00

Qatar	61–71	Chinese Taipei
Scoring by quarter: 14–16, 18–18, 14–21, 15–16
Pts: Orabi 15; Rebs: Zaidan 16; Asts: Masoud 2		Pts: Yang 19; Rebs: Tien 12; Asts: Yang 5

Geumjeong Gymnasium, Busan

30 September
13:00

Chinese Taipei	75–86	Kazakhstan
Scoring by quarter: 19–32, 24–18, 12–22, 20–14
Pts: Tien 18; Rebs: Tien 8 Asts: Chou H. 3		Pts: Issakov 26; Rebs: Tikhonenko 17; Asts: Ovsyannikov 4

Geumjeong Gymnasium, Busan

=== 9~12 placing ===
Pos	Team	Pld	W	L	PF	PA	PD	Pts
1	Qatar	3	3	0	266	173	+93	6
2	Kuwait	3	2	1	231	228	+3	5
3	United Arab Emirates	3	1	2	224	230	−6	4
4	Mongolia	3	0	3	233	323	−90	3

Source: Results

2 October
13:00

Kuwait	77–74	United Arab Emirates
Scoring by quarter: 23–21, 19–14, 11–19, 24–20
Pts: Al-Sarraf 23; Rebs: Al-Shammari 11; Asts: Al-Bahar, A. Al-Mutairi 2		Pts: S. Salem, Ahmed 20; Rebs: Abdulla 7 Asts: S. Salem 9

Geumjeong Gymnasium, Busan

4 October
19:00

Mongolia	77–115	Qatar
Scoring by quarter: 17–34, 15–25, 28–29, 17–27
Pts: Otgonbayar 19; Rebs: Sedbazar 13; Asts: Erkhembayar 2		Pts: Ismail 26; Rebs: Zaidan 12; Asts: Musa 6

Geumjeong Gymnasium, Busan

6 October
19:00

United Arab Emirates	109–84	Mongolia
Scoring by quarter: 29–23, 28–18, 25–26, 27–17
Pts: J. Salem 24; Rebs: J. Salem 12; Asts: Obaid 5		Pts: Sedbazar, Tsogtbaatar 18; Rebs: Erkhembayar 11; Asts: Sedbazar 2

Geumjeong Gymnasium, Busan

7 October
19:00

Qatar	82–55	Kuwait
Scoring by quarter: 23–17, 18–12, 24–14, 17–12
Pts: Zaidan 18; Rebs: Zaidan 18; Asts: four players 2		Pts: Al-Shammari 15; Rebs: Al-Tabakh 7 Asts: Abdulredha, Al-Tabakh 3

Geumjeong Gymnasium, Busan

9 October
19:00

Kuwait	99–72	Mongolia
Scoring by quarter: 36–21, 32–15, 15–16, 16–20
Pts: Farhan 20; Rebs: Baqer 8 Asts: Farhan 4		Pts: Erkhembayar 16; Rebs: Sedbazar 14; Asts: four players 1

Geumjeong Gymnasium, Busan

10 October
13:00

United Arab Emirates	41–69	Qatar
Scoring by quarter: 11–15, 5–12, 14–13, 11–29
Pts: Mubarak 13; Rebs: Abdulla 10; Asts: Ahmed, Abdulla 1		Pts: Omer 22; Rebs: Ismail 11; Asts: Masoud, Musa 2

Geumjeong Gymnasium, Busan

=== Quarterfinals ===
==== Group I ====
Pos	Team	Pld	W	L	PF	PA	PD	Pts	Qualification
1	China	3	3	0	309	160	+149	6	Semifinals
2	Philippines	3	2	1	213	235	−22	5	Semifinals
3	Japan	3	1	2	220	260	−40	4	5/6 placing
4	Chinese Taipei	3	0	3	196	283	−87	3	7/8 placing

Source: Results

2 October
15:00

China	113–50	Chinese Taipei
Scoring by quarter: 32–14, 23–16, 23–7, 35–13
Pts: Yao 22; Rebs: Yao 13; Asts: Hu 5		Pts: Yang 19; Rebs: Ho 8 Asts: four players 1

Geumjeong Gymnasium, Busan

2 October
17:00

Philippines	79–74	Japan
Scoring by quarter: 17–13, 17–27, 18–18, 27–16
Pts: Taulava 27; Rebs: Taulava 12; Asts: Ildefonso, Cariaso 1		Pts: Orimo 33; Rebs: Takahashi 9 Asts: Setsumasa, Orimo 2

Geumjeong Gymnasium, Busan

4 October
13:00

Chinese Taipei	69–83	Philippines
Scoring by quarter: 15–21, 19–22, 8–19, 27–21
Pts: Chiu 19; Rebs: Tien 11; Asts: four players 1		Pts: Taulava 18; Rebs: Menk 11; Asts: Duremdes 3

Geumjeong Gymnasium, Busan

5 October
13:00

Japan	59–104	China
Scoring by quarter: 10–33, 14–26, 16–18, 19–27
Pts: Orimo 24; Rebs: Ishizaka 6 Asts: Ono, Watanabe 3		Pts: Yao 19; Rebs: Yao 14; Asts: Yao 5

Geumjeong Gymnasium, Busan

7 October
13:00

Chinese Taipei	77–87	Japan
Scoring by quarter: 28–34, 18–19, 14–19, 17–15
Pts: Chiu 30; Rebs: Tien 8 Asts: Lee C.M., Yang, Chiu 1		Pts: Orimo 22; Rebs: Takahashi 16; Asts: Furuta 3

Geumjeong Gymnasium, Busan

8 October
19:00

China	92–51	Philippines
Scoring by quarter: 19–10, 19–11, 33–12, 21–18
Pts: Hu 20; Rebs: Gong, Liu Y., Mengke 6 Asts: Liu W., Hu 2		Pts: Espino 7 Rebs: Ildefonso 5 Asts: Hatfield 2

Geumjeong Gymnasium, Busan

==== Group II ====
Pos	Team	Pld	W	L	PF	PA	PD	Pts	Qualification
1	South Korea	3	3	0	316	241	+75	6	Semifinals
2	Kazakhstan	3	2	1	269	272	−3	5	Semifinals
3	North Korea	3	1	2	240	254	−14	4	5/6 placing
4	Hong Kong	3	0	3	199	257	−58	3	7/8 placing

Source: Results

3 October
15:00

South Korea	101–85	North Korea
Scoring by quarter: 27–20, 21–26, 30–14, 23–25
Pts: Moon 28; Rebs: Seo 14; Asts: Lee S. 7		Pts: Pak C. 30; Rebs: Jo 7 Asts: Pak C., Jo 2

Geumjeong Gymnasium, Busan

3 October
19:00

Kazakhstan	82–77	Hong Kong
Scoring by quarter: 25–20, 15–25, 22–9, 20–23
Pts: Issakov 25; Rebs: Tikhonenko 12; Asts: Lopatin, Issakov, Ovsyannikov 2		Pts: Yung K. 30; Rebs: Tam 14; Asts: Poon 3

Geumjeong Gymnasium, Busan

6 October
19:00

North Korea	81–89	Kazakhstan
Scoring by quarter: 27–15, 17–25, 22–30, 15–19
Pts: Pak C. 30; Rebs: Ri M. 17; Asts: Pak C. 3		Pts: Issakov 30; Rebs: Tikhonenko 18; Asts: Dedov 4

Geumjeong Gymnasium, Busan

6 October
15:00

Hong Kong	58–101	South Korea
Scoring by quarter: 14–29, 13–25, 14–20, 17–27
Pts: Li 17; Rebs: Tam 10; Asts: Li 4		Pts: Hyun, Moon, Seo 14; Rebs: Hyun, Chun 8 Asts: Hyun, Chun 4

Geumjeong Gymnasium, Busan

8 October
15:00

North Korea	74–64	Hong Kong
Scoring by quarter: 17–25, 21–11, 16–20, 20–8
Pts: Ri M. 22; Rebs: Ri M. 18; Asts: Pak I. 4		Pts: Lui 15; Rebs: Tam 9 Asts: Yung K. 2

Geumjeong Gymnasium, Busan

9 October
15:00

South Korea	114–98	Kazakhstan
Scoring by quarter: 25–25, 38–20, 22–21, 29–32
Pts: Moon 22; Rebs: Kim J. 9 Asts: Kim S., Lee S. 4		Pts: Dedov 25; Rebs: Vdovin 11; Asts: Strebkov, Ovsyannikov 3

Geumjeong Gymnasium, Busan

=== 5~8 placing ===
==== 7/8 placing ====
10 October
17:00

Chinese Taipei	85–71	Hong Kong
Scoring by quarter: 23–27, 24–12, 22–16, 16–16
Pts: Tseng 23; Rebs: Yang, Tseng 7 Asts: Wu C. 4		Pts: Lui 23; Rebs: Tam 13; Asts: Lui, Heung, Tam 1

Geumjeong Gymnasium, Busan

==== 5/6 placing ====
13 October
13:00

Japan	65–74	North Korea
Scoring by quarter: 15–22, 15–21, 17–18, 18–13
Pts: Takahashi 22; Rebs: Shinohara 9 Asts: Orimo 5		Pts: Pak C. 22; Rebs: Pak K., Ri M. 8 Asts: Pak C. 6

Geumjeong Gymnasium, Busan

=== Final round ===
Semifinals
12 October
South Korea	69
Philippines	68
12 October
China	131
Kazakhstan	62

Final
14 October
South Korea (OT)	102
China	100
3/4 placing
13 October
Philippines	66
Kazakhstan	68

==== Semifinals ====
12 October
15:00

South Korea	69–68	Philippines
Scoring by quarter: 15–23, 21–11, 22–18, 11–16
Pts: Moon 18; Rebs: Seo 8 Asts: Lee S. 4		Pts: Racela 14; Rebs: Menk 12; Asts: Hontiveros 2

Sajik Arena, Busan

12 October
19:00

China	131–62	Kazakhstan
Scoring by quarter: 34–23, 30–16, 36–11, 31–12
Pts: Li 24; Rebs: Mengke 9 Asts: Guo, Liu W. 3		Pts: Issakov 16; Rebs: Vdovin 8 Asts: Ovsyannikov 4

Sajik Arena, Busan

==== 3/4 placing ====
13 October
17:00

Philippines	66–68	Kazakhstan
Scoring by quarter: 22–16, 15–21, 15–17, 14–14
Pts: Cariaso 18; Rebs: Taulava 17; Asts: Racela 3		Pts: Strebkov 30; Rebs: Vdovin 10; Asts: Issakov, Vdovin 1

Sajik Arena, Busan

==== Final ====
14 October
15:30

South Korea	102–100 (OT)	China
Scoring by quarter: 18–25, 18–24, 26–18, 28–23, Overtime: 12–10
Pts: Kim J. 21; Rebs: Seo 6 Asts: Kim S. 9		Pts: Yao 23; Rebs: Yao 22; Asts: Liu W., Liu Y. 2

Sajik Arena, Busan

== Final standing ==
Rank	Team	Pld	W	L
1st place, gold medalist(s)	South Korea	7	7	0
2nd place, silver medalist(s)	China	7	6	1
3rd place, bronze medalist(s)	Kazakhstan	7	4	3
4	Philippines	7	4	3
5	North Korea	6	3	3
6	Japan	6	2	4
7	Chinese Taipei	6	2	4
8	Hong Kong	6	1	5
9	Qatar	5	4	1
10	Kuwait	5	2	3
11	United Arab Emirates	5	1	4
12	Mongolia	5	0	5
