= Brian Yamsuan =

Filipino politician

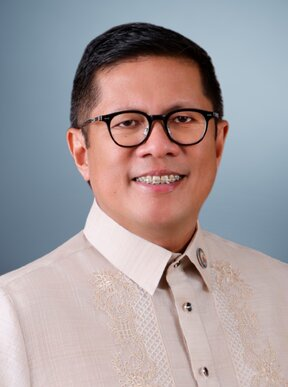
- Official portrait, 2025

Member of the House of Representatives from Parañaque's 2nd district
- Incumbent
- Assumed office June 30, 2025
- Preceded by: Gus Tambunting

Member of the House of Representatives for Bicol Saro
- In office February 22, 2023 – June 30, 2025
- Preceded by: Nicolas Enciso VIII
- Succeeded by: Terry Ridon

Personal details
- Born: Brian Raymund Sandoval Yamsuan; October 19, 1973 (age 52) Sampaloc, Manila, Philippines
- Party: NUP (2025–present)
- Other party: Independent (2024–2025); Bicol Saro (partylist; 2023–2025); Lunas (partylist; 2021–2023)
- Occupation: Politician

Brian Raymund Sandoval Yamsuan (born October 19, 1973) is a Filipino politician and former government consultant who has serving as representative of the 2nd District of Parañaque since 2025. He served as the representative for Bicol Saro Partylist from 2023 to 2025.

== Early life and education ==
Brian Raymund Sandoval Yamsuan was born on October 19, 1973. He attended the National University for his secondary studies. Yamsuan pursued an undergraduate degree in political science at the Far Eastern University.

== Legislative Accomplishments ==
As a member of the House of Representatives of the Philippines, Yamsuan has advanced legislative measures centered on social protection, digital governance, economic development, and national security. His legislative agenda has been framed around what describes as improving access to health care, education, employment, and public services.

Bills filed in the 20th Congress

As Principal Author of Bills Related to Health

- House Bill No. 02239 - An Act Providing For Free Annual Medical Check-up For Filipinos And Appropriating Funds Therefor (Filed on July 23, 2025)
- House Bill No. 06307 - An Act Converting The Dr. Eva Macaraeg-macapagal National Center For Geriatric Health Under The Jose R. Reyes Memorial Medical Center As The National Center For Geriatric Health And Research Institute, Defining Its Powers And Functions, And Appropriating Funds Therefor (Filed on November 24, 2025)
- House Bill No. 06310 - An Act Expanding The Philhealth Outpatient Coverage On Dialysis And Renal Replacement Therapy, And For Other Purposes (Filed on November 24, 2025)

As Principal Author of Bills Related to Labor and Employment

- House Bill No. 02240 - An Act Granting Maternity Benefits To Women Workers In The Informal Economy, Amending For This Purpose Republic Act No 11210, Appropriating Funds Therefor, And For Other Purposes (Filed on July 23, 2025)
- House Bill No. 03216 - An Act Providing Protection And Incentives To Freelance Workers (Filed on August 6, 2025)
- House Bill No. 03217 - An Act Providing Livelihood Assistance For Disadvantaged Workers And Institutionalizing The Department Of Labor And Employment´s Integrated Livelihood Program (Filed on August 6, 2025)
- House Bill No. 03218 - An Act Providing For Financial Literacy And Fraud Prevention Programs For Filipino Workers (Filed on August 6, 2025)
- House Bill No. 06602 - An Act Increasing The Service Incentive Leave Of Employees, Amending For The Purpose Article 95 Of Presidential Decree No. 442, As Amended, Otherwise Known As The Labor Code Of The Philippines (Filed on December 3, 2025)

As Principal Author of Bills Related to Persons with Disabilities

- House Bill No. 02241 - An Act Institutionalizing A National Employment Facilitation Service Network For Persons With Disability (Pwds) And Senior Citizens Through The Establishment Of A Local Center For Inclusive Employment In Every Province, Key City And Other Strategic Areas Throughout The Country (Filed on July 23, 2025)
- House Bill No. 06306 - An Act Further Amending Republic Act No. 7277, Otherwise Known As The “Magna Carta For Persons With Disability,” As Amended, To Provide For The Lifetime Validity Of Identification Cards Issued To Persons With Permanent Disability (Filed on November 24, 2025)

As Principal Author of Bills Related to Higher and Technical Education

- House Bill No. 02242 - An Act Granting Free Tuition For Government Employees Enrolled In Graduate Education Master's Program At State Universities And Colleges (Filed on July 23, 2025)
- House Bill No. 04037 - An Act Expanding The Courses Offered By The Technical Education And Skills Development Authority To Cover Emerging Technologies And Digital Skills, And For Other Purposes (Filed on August 26, 2025)
- House Bill No. 05242 - An Act Establishing A Legal Scholarship And Return Service Program For Deserving Students, And Appropriating Funds Therefor (Filed on October 7, 2025)

As Principal Author of Bills Related to Public Order and Safety

- House Bill No. 02243 - An Act Requiring Business Establishments To Install Closed Circuit Television (Cctv) Cameras In Their Place Of Business As A Means To Deter Crime (Filed on July 23, 2025)
- House Bill No. 02244 - An Act Modernizing The Crime Investigation Techniques Of Law Enforcement Agencies And For Other Purposes (Filed on July 23, 2025)

As Principal Author of Bills Related to Basic Education and Culture

- House Bill No. 02579 - An Act Institutionalizing The Provision Of A Health Maintenance Organization (Hmo) System For Public School Teachers And Other Non-teaching Personnel Of The Department Of Education, And Appropriating Funds Therefor (Filed on July 30, 2025)
- House Bill No. 02657 - An Act Granting An Annual Stipend For All Students In Public And Private Schools (Filed on July 30, 2025)
- House Bill No. 04033 - An Act Providing School Supplies For Students In Public Schools (Filed on August 26, 2025)
- House Bill No. 05240 - An Act Establishing The Creation Of A Telecounseling Program For Public Schools, Providing For Teleconsultation Services By Guidance Counselors And Mental Health Professionals, And Appropriating Funds Therefor (Filed on October 7, 2025)
- House Bill No. 05243 - An Act Institutionalizing The Grant Of Vacation Service Credits To Public School Teachers, And For Other Purposes (Filed on October 7, 2025)
- House Bill No. 05574 - An Act Enhancing The Welfare And Professional Development Of Special Needs Education Teachers By Upgrading Their Salary Grade And For Other Purposes (Filed on October 15, 2025)
- House Bill No. 06311 - An Act Strengthening The National Feeding Program, Amending For The Purpose Republic Act No. 11037, Otherwise Known As The “Masustansyang Pagkain Para Sa Batang Pilipino Act,” Appropriating Funds Therefor, And For Other Purposes (Filed on November 24, 2025)

As Principal Author of Bills Related to Social Services

- House Bill No. 02580 - An Act Institutionalizing The Sustainable Livelihood Program (Filed on July 30, 2025)

As Principal Author of Bills Related to Transportation

- House Bill No. 02581 - An Act Establishing A Magna Carta For Commuters (Filed on July 30, 2025)

As Principal Author of Bills Related to Housing and Urban Development

- House Bill No. 02582 - An Act Amending Section 18 Of Republic Act No. 9904, Otherwise Known As The "Magna Carta For Homeowners And Homeowners' Associations" By Mandating Local Government Units To Hold Bi-annual Public Consultations With Members Of Homeowners Associations (Filed on July 30, 2025)
- House Bill No. 05575 - An Act Establishing An On-site, In-city Or Near City, Or Off-city Government Resettlement Program For Informal Settler Families In Accordance With A People´s Plan And Mandating The Implementing Local Government Unit, Jointly With The Department Of Human Settlements And Urban Development, In Cases Of Near-city Or Off-city Resettlement, To Provide Other Basic Services And Livelihood Components In Favor Of The Recipient Local Government Unit, Amending For The Purpose Republic Act No. 7279, As Amended, Otherwise Known As The “Urban Development And Housing Act Of 1992” (Filed on October 15, 2025)

As Principal Author of Bills Related to Information and Technology

- House Bill No. 03214 - An Act Establishing Protection Against Deepfakes, Recognizing The Right To ONE´s Face, Body, And Voice, Providing Trademark Protection, And For Other Purposes (Filed on August 6, 2025)

As Principal Author of Bills Related to Local Government

- House Bill No. 03215 - An Act Establishing A Magna Carta For Barangay Health Workers (Filed on August 6, 2025)
- House Bill No. 06308 - An Act To Strengthen Youth Leadership And Governance By Improving The Mandatory And Continuing Training Programs For Sangguniang Kabataan Officials, Amending Sections 28 And 29 Of Republic Act No. 10742, Ðžtherwise Known As The "Sangguniang Kð�bð�taan Reform Act Of 2015,” As Amended By Republic Act No. 11768 (Filed on November 24, 2025)

As Principal Author of Bills Related to Revision of Laws

- House Bill No. 04034 - An Act Providing For Online Registration And Renewal Of The Solo Parent Identification Card And Mandating Coordination With Government Agencies For Ease Of Registration, Amending For This Purpose Republic Act No. 8972, As Amended (Filed on August 26, 2025)

As Principal Author of Bills Related to Disaster Resilience

- House Bill No. 04035 - An Act Requiring The Creation And Consistent Updating Of Multi-hazard Maps For All Cities And Municipalities In The Country (Filed on August 26, 2025)
- House Bill No. 05239 - An Act Providing For The Magna Carta For Public Disaster Risk Reduction And Management Workers (Filed on October 7, 2025)

As Principal Author of Bills Related to Senior Citizens

- House Bill No. 04036 - An Act Establishing And Institutionalizing Long-term Care For Senior Citizens, Providing Funds Therefor And For Other Purposes (Filed on August 26, 2025)

As Principal Author of Bills Related to Tourism

- House Bill No. 04793 - An Act Abolishing The Travel Tax On Filipinos And On Nationals Of Association Of Southeast Asian Nations (ASEAN) Member States Travelling To Other ASEAN Member States (Filed on September 23, 2025)

As Principal Author of Bills Related to Public Information

- House Bill No. 04794 - An Act Requiring The Use Of Plain Language In Government Advisories And Other Related Documents For Public Distribution (Filed on September 23, 2025)
- House Bill No. 05241 - An Act Penalizing The Malicious And Deliberate Dissemination Of False Information That Undermines Public Order Or National Security, Strengthening Regulations On Fake News Through Digital Platforms, And For Other Purposes (Filed on October 7, 2025)

As Principal Author of Bills Related to Welfare on Children

- House Bill No. 04795 - An Act Granting Benefits To Child Development And Day Care Workers And Appropriating Funds Therefor (Filed on September 23, 2025)
- House Bill No. 06309 - An Act Providing A Comprehensive And Affordable Framework For Early Detection And Intervention Services For Children With Special Needs And Instituting Scholarship Grants To Establish A Special Needs-related Medical Workforce (Filed on November 24, 2025)

As Principal Author of Bills Related to National Defense and Security

- House Bill No. 04796 - An Act Granting Benefits To Child Development And Day Care Workers And Appropriating Funds Therefor (Filed on September 23, 2025)

As Principal Author of Bills Related to Justice

- House Bill No. 04797 - An Act Prohibiting The Operation Of Drones Within A 100-meter Radius From Jail Facilities, Providing Penalties For Violations Thereof, And For Other Purposes (Filed on September 23, 2025)

== Committee Membership - 20th Congress ==
Committee Membership of Brian Yamsuan
	Committee	Position
20th Congress	Games and Amusement	Vice Chairperson
20th Congress	Labor and Employment	Member for the Majority
20th Congress	Public Information	Vice Chairperson
20th Congress	Public Order and Safety	Member for the Majority
20th Congress	Transportation	Vice Chairperson
20th Congress	Youth and Sports Development	Member for the Majority

== Career ==
Brian Raymund Yamsuan began his career in public service and media relations in 1996 as a media and political affairs officer in the office of then Senator Edgardo Angara. During the administration of President Joseph Estrada, he served as chief of staff and head of the Media Relations and Accreditation Division in the Office of the Press Secretary under Rod Reyes and Dong Puno. He later became chief of staff in the office of then Senator Teresita Aquino-Oreta.

In 2004, Yamsuan served as deputy media director of the FPJ Media Bureau, overseeing its day-to-day media operations during the presidential campaign of Fernando Poe Jr.. In 2006, he was appointed Assistant Secretary for Public Affairs at the Department of the Interior and Local Government under Secretary Ronaldo Puno.

He also served as a consultant in the Office of the Executive Secretary during the administration of President Benigno Aquino III. In 2019, he was designated Deputy Secretary General of the House of Representatives of the Philippines by then Speaker Alan Peter Cayetano. He was also secretary general for the National Unity Party.

=== House of Representatives ===
==== Lunas ====
Yamsuan was the first nominee for the Lunas Partylist in the 2022 elections. Lunas did not win a seat, placing 102nd out of 176 partylist groups.

==== Bicol Saro ====
Bicol Saro won a seat for the 19th Congress via the 2022 elections. Yamsuan took oath as representative for the party-list group on February 22, 2023. He filled the vacancy caused by the expulsion of Nicolas Enciso VIII from Bicol Saro on February 6.

==== Parañaque 2nd district ====
A resident of Parañaque for around 20 years, Yamsuan ran in the 2025 election to become representative of the city's 2nd congressional district while simultaneously fulfilling his duties as Bicol Saro representative. Running as an independent, he defeated incumbent congressman Gus Tambunting in the local election.

== Television ==
Yamsuan is the titular host of the musical show Sessions with Brian Yamsuan on Bilyonaryo News Channel and Mellow 94.7.

== Electoral history ==
Electoral history of Brian Yamsuan
Year	Office	Party	Votes received				Result
Year	Office	Party	Total	%	P.	Swing	Result
2025	Representative (Parañaque–2nd)	Independent	61,378	51.19%	1st	—N/a	Won
