= Binky Favis =

Filipino basketball player, coach and politician

The Honorable Binky Favis
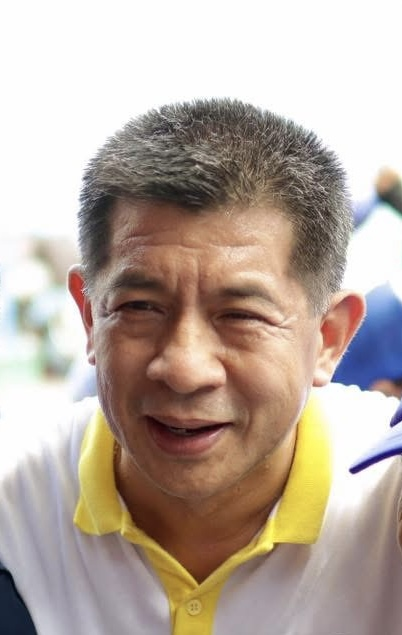
- Favis in 2025

Member of the Parañaque City Council from the 2nd district
- Incumbent
- Assumed office June 30, 2025
- In office June 30, 2013 – June 30, 2022

Personal details
- Born: Vincent Kenneth Marasigan Favis; November 22, 1969 (age 56) Pasay, Rizal, Philippines
- Party: Independent (2024–present)
- Other political affiliations: PDP–Laban (2018–2024); Liberal (2009–2010; 2015–2018); UNA (2012–2015)
- Spouse: Ella Aldeguer
- Children: 3
- Relatives: Cristina Aldeguer-Roque (sister-in-law); Dino Aldeguer (brother-in-law)
- Basketball career

UP Fighting Maroons
- Position: Assistant coach
- League: UAAP

Personal information
- Listed height: 5 ft 11 in (1.80 m)

Career information
- High school: La Salle Green Hills (Mandaluyong)
- College: UST
- Coaching career: 1993–2008

Career history

Coaching
- 1993–1997: UST (assistant)
- 1995–1999: UST HS
- 1998: Batangas Blades
- 1999–2001: Letran
- 2000–2001: Pop Cola Panthers (assistant)
- 2002–2003: Coca–Cola Tigers (assistant)
- 2002: Philippines (assistant)
- 2003–2005: Barangay Ginebra Kings (assistant)
- 2005–2008: Coca-Cola Tigers
- 2005–2007: Philippines (assistant)
- 2026–present: UP (assistant)

Career highlights
- As head coach: NCAA Philippines champion (1999); As assistant coach: 4x UAAP Champion (1993, 1994, 1995, 1996); 4x PBA Champion (2002 All-Filipino, 2003 Reinforced, 2004 Fiesta, 2004–05 Philippine)
Medals
Men's basketball
Assistant coach for Philippines
William Jones Cup
Bronze medal – third place	2005 Taipei	Team
Bronze medal – third place	2007 Taipei	Team

Vincent Kenneth "Binky" Marasigan Favis (born November 22, 1969) is a Filipino professional basketball coach, former basketball plater, businessman, and politician. He currently serves as the assistant coach for the UP Fighting Maroons men's basketball since 2026, as well as a councilor of Parañaque from the 2nd district since 2025 and previously from 2013 to 2022.

== Coaching career ==
Favis was also a former player of the UST Growling Tigers and was an assistant coach of the 1993 squad, which swept the University Athletic Association of the Philippines men's basketball tournament, he also stayed until 1997. In 1995, he coached the Tiger Cubs, until 1999.

Favis is a former coach of the Letran Knights in the NCAA leading them to a title in 1999. He also coached in Philippine Basketball League for several teams.

In 2000, he was hired by Chot Reyes as an assistant coach for Pop Cola Panthers. When Pop Cola was sold to Coke Philippines in 2001, he stayed to be an assistant coach for Coke Tigers and won two PBA championships.

He became the assistant coach of Jong Uichico for the Philippine national basketball team in the 2002 Asian Games.

He later joined Barangay Ginebra in 2003 and won another two championship.

He later returned to national team, this time as Reyes' coaching staff.

Before the 2005–06 season, he was named as the head coach of Coca-Cola Tigers and had several lackluster seasons with the team. In 2008, he was relieved as head coach of the Tigers.

== Coaching record ==
=== Collegiate record ===
Season	Team	Elimination round					Playoffs				
Season	Team	GP	W	L	PCT	Finish	GP	W	L	PCT	Results
1999	CSJL	14	9	5	.643	4th	3	3	0	1.000	Champions
2000	CSJL	14	4	10	.286	7th	—	—	—	—	Eliminated
2001	CSJL	14	6	8	.429	6th	—	—	—	—	Eliminated
Totals			19	23	.452		3	3	0	1.000	1 championship

=== Professional record ===
Season	Conference	Team	Elimination/classification round					Playoffs				
Season	Conference	Team	GP	W	L	PCT	Finish	PG	W	L	PCT	Results
2005–06	Fiesta	Coke	16	6	10	.375	9th	1	0	1	.000	Survivor playoffs
2005–06	Philippine Cup	Coke	16	7	9	.438	5th	4	1	3	.250	Quaerterfinals
2006–07	Philippine Cup	Coke	18	5	13	.278	9th	3	1	2	.333	Wildcard phase
2006–07	Fiesta	Coke	18	7	11	.389	7th	2	1	1	.500	Wildcard phase
2007–08	Philippine Cup	Coke	18	7	11	.389	9th	5	2	3	.400	Quarterfinals
2007–08	Fiesta	Coke	18	10	8	.556	4th	3	1	2	.333	Quarterfinals
Career total			104	42	62	.403	Playoff Total	18	6	12	.333	0 championships

== Political career ==
Favis initially ran for councilor of Parañaque City from the 2nd district in 2010 but lost. He was later successfully elected in 2013, serving for three consecutive terms until 2022. Upon being term-limited, he ran for vice mayor of Parañaque in 2022 as the running mate of mayoralty candidate Eric Olivarez, but lost; Olivarez, however, was elected. He sought a comeback to the city council in 2025, this time as an independent candidate. He won a seat after placing third.

== Personal life ==
Favis is married to Ella Aldeguer, an industrial engineering graduate from De La Salle University who is the sister of incumbent Philippine trade secretary Cristina Aldeguer-Roque and former PBA player Dino Aldeguer. They have three children.

Sporting positions
Preceded by Louie Alas	Letran Knights men's basketball head coach 1999 -2001	Succeeded by Louie Alas
Preceded by Eric Altamirano	Coca-Cola Tigers head coach 2005-2008	Succeeded by Kenneth Duremdes
