= NCAA Season 75 basketball tournaments =

75th NCAA season
- Host school: Jose Rizal College
Men's Finals	G1	G2 (Note: Match abandoned with 3:01 left in the second half; JRC conceded the game and the NCAA awarded Letran the game by default.)	Wins
JRC Heavy Bombers	74	60	0
Letran Knights	75	83	2
- Duration: October 4–8, 1999
- Arena(s): Ninoy Aquino Stadium; PhilSports Arena
- Winning coach: Binky Favis (1st title)
- Semifinalists: San Sebastian Stags; Perpetual Altas
- TV network(s): VTV (IBC)
Juniors' Finals	G1	G2	Wins
San Beda Red Cubs	65	79	1+1
Mapua Red Robins	79	64	1
- Duration: October 4–8, 1999
- Arena(s): Ninoy Aquino Stadium; PhilSports Arena
- Winning coach: Ato Badolato (12th title)

The NCAA Season 75 basketball tournaments are the Philippines' National Collegiate Athletic Association tournaments for basketball in its 1999–2000 season. Jose Rizal College hosted the season, starting with an opening ceremony held at the Araneta Coliseum on July 18, 1999, followed by a quadruple-header. Vintage Television aired the games for the third consecutive season via the Intercontinental Broadcasting Corporation.

== Men's tournament ==
=== Elimination round ===
Pos	Team	W	L	PCT	GB	Qualification
1	San Sebastian Stags	9	5	.643	—	Twice-to-beat in the semifinals
2	JRC Heavy Bombers (H)	9	5	.643	—	Twice-to-beat in the semifinals
3	Perpetual Altas	8	6	.571	1	Twice-to-win in the semifinals
4	Letran Knights	8	6	.571	1	Twice-to-win in the semifinals
5	San Beda Red Lions	6	8	.429	3	
6	Mapúa Cardinals	6	8	.429	3	
7	Benilde Blazers (X)	5	9	.357	4	
8	PCU Dolphins	5	9	.357	4	

Rules for classification: 1) winning percentage; 2) if tied for #2 and #4, one-game playoff; 3) head-to-head record; 4) head-to-head point differential; 5) overall point differential
(H) Hosts; (X) Under probation

=== Bracket ===
Semifinals (Top 2 twice-to-beat)
1	San Sebastian	63	L
4	Letran	65	W
2	JRC	84
3	UPHR	63

Finals (Best-of-three playoff)
4	Letran	75	83
2	JRC	74	60

=== Semifinals ===
The top 2 teams had the twice-to-beat advantage, where the top 2 teams have to be beaten twice, while their opponents just once, to progress.

==== (1) San Sebastian vs. (4) Letran ====
September 27

San Sebastian Stags	63–65	Letran Knights

Ninoy Aquino Stadium, Manila

September 30

San Sebastian Stags	L–W	Letran Knights
Letran wins series in two games

Ninoy Aquino Stadium, Manila

The Knights forced a rubber match by winning the first game. Letran led by 14 early in the second half. However, San Sebastian converted seven three-point field-goals to tie the game at 61-all. Letran then closed on the Stags' shooters and allowed them just one basket moving forward to force a Game 2. Letran then won Game 2.

==== (2) JRC vs. (3) UPHR ====
September 27

JRC Heavy Bombers	84–63	UPHR Altas
JRC wins series in one game

Ninoy Aquino Stadium, Manila

UPHR was leading early in the second half when JRC had a 20–5 run that blew the game wide open for good. The Heavy Bombers' win marked their first finals appearance since 1972.

=== Finals ===
October 4

JRC Heavy Bombers	74–75	Letran Knights

Ninoy Aquino Stadium, Manila

October 8

JRC Heavy Bombers	60–83	Letran Knights
Letran wins series 2–0

PhilSports Arena, Pasig

In Game 1, Letran ran to a 15–5 start, only to have JRC mount their own 13–4 run. The Knights kept the lead at halftime, 46–43. With five minutes left in the second half, Letran guard John Prior fouled out, setting John Dale Valeña to score 10 points to put JRC up. With 2:08 left in the game and with the Heavy Bombers up 74–72, Letran's defense caused JRC to miss shots. A free-throw from Kerby Raymundo, named Most Valuable Player prior to the game, cut the JRC lead to one. Raymundo then forced Ariel Capus to throw up an airball, which led to Aldin Ayo scoring on a lay-up to put the Knights in the lead. Both teams then failed to score in the ensuing possessions, setting up a final possession for JRC, where Valeña missed a lay-up to give the Knights the Game 1 victory.

On the next game, Letran again started well, erecting a 13–2 lead early in the first half. JRC cut the lead down to four at 13–9, but the Knights then had another 27–11 run; Letran eventually had a 44–26 lead at halftime. At halftime, fracas ensued when Letran supporters rained debris on JRC cheerleaders, causing the game to be delayed by an hour. JRC never got close in the second half. With 3 minutes remaining, and with Letran leading 83–60, Letran's John Prior elbowed John Dale Valeña in the face, in front of the JRC bench. Valeña then threw a punch on Prior at the nape, then the JRC supporters rained debris on the court, causing the game to be delayed again. JRC coach Boy de Vera wanted to finish the game, but was overruled by JRC officials, conceding the game to Letran. Knights coach Binky Favis later said "It would have been a sweeter victory if the game finished, but a championship is a championship."

== Juniors' tournament ==
=== Finals ===
October 4

San Beda Red Cubs	65–79	Mapua Red Robins

Ninoy Aquino Stadium, Manila

October 8

San Beda Red Cubs	72–64	Mapua Red Robins
San Beda wins series in two games

PhilSports Arena, Pasig

Armed with the twice-to-beat advantage after winning all 14 elimination round games, San Beda was beaten for the first time in the season by Mapua, extending the series. In the deciding Game 2, Magnum Membrere led the Red Cubs to the juniors' championship.

== Notes ==
Preceded by Season 74 (1998)	NCAA basketball seasons Season 75 (1999)	Succeeded by Season 76 (2000)
