= Philippine House Committee on Banks and Financial Intermediaries =

Standing committee of the House of Representatives of the Philippines

Committee on Banks and Financial Intermediaries
- 20th Congress

History
- New session started: July 28, 2025

Leadership
- Chair: Irwin Tieng, Lakas since July 30, 2025
- Minority Leader: Vacant since June 30, 2025

Website
- Committee on Banks and Financial Intermediaries

The Philippine House Committee on Banks and Financial Intermediaries, or House Banks and Financial Intermediaries Committee is a standing committee of the Philippine House of Representatives.

== Jurisdiction ==
As prescribed by House Rules, the committee's jurisdiction includes the following:

- Banking and currency
- Government-owned or controlled banks and financial institutions
- Insurance
- Non-government banks and financial institutions
- Securities and securities exchange

== Members, 20th Congress ==
Position	Member	Constituency	Party
Chairperson	Irwin Tieng	Manila–5th	Lakas
Vice Chairpersons	Vacant		
Members for the Majority	Vacant		
Members for the Minority	Vacant		

== Historical membership rosters ==
=== 18th Congress ===
Position	Members	Party	Province/City	District
Chairperson	Junie Cua	PDP–Laban	Quirino	Lone
Vice Chairpersons	Sharon Garin	AAMBIS-OWA	Party-list	
Vice Chairpersons	Ramon Nolasco Jr.	NUP	Cagayan	1st
Vice Chairpersons	John Reynald Tiangco	Partido Navoteño	Navotas	Lone
Vice Chairpersons	Jose Gay Padiernos	GP	Party-list	
Vice Chairpersons	Virgilio Lacson	MANILA TEACHERS	Party-list	
Members for the Majority	Jose Ong Jr.	NUP	Northern Samar	2nd
Members for the Majority	Vincent Franco Frasco	Lakas	Cebu	5th
Members for the Majority	Juliette Uy	NUP	Misamis Oriental	2nd
Members for the Majority	Alyssa Sheena Tan	PFP	Isabela	4th
Members for the Majority	Anthony Peter Crisologo	NUP	Quezon City	1st
Members for the Majority	Juliet Marie Ferrer	NUP	Negros Occidental	4th
Members for the Majority	Eric Yap	ACT-CIS	Party-list	
Members for the Majority	Raymond Democrito Mendoza	TUCP	Party-list	
Members for the Majority	Victor Yap	NPC	Tarlac	2nd
Members for the Majority	Michael John Duavit	NPC	Rizal	1st
Members for the Majority	Weslie Gatchalian	NPC	Valenzuela	1st
Members for the Majority	Gil Acosta	PPP	Palawan	3rd
Members for the Majority	Luis Campos Jr.	NPC	Makati	2nd
Members for the Majority	Allan Benedict Reyes	PFP	Quezon City	3rd
Members for the Majority	Edward Maceda	PMP	Manila	4th
Members for the Majority	Precious Castelo	NPC	Quezon City	2nd
Members for the Majority	Enrico Pineda	1PACMAN	Party-list	
Members for the Majority	Henry Villarica	PDP–Laban	Bulacan	4th
Members for the Majority	Marisol Panotes	PDP–Laban	Camarines Norte	2nd
Members for the Majority	Josefina Tallado	PDP–Laban	Camarines Norte	1st
Members for the Majority	Alan 1 Ecleo	PDP–Laban	Dinagat Islands	Lone
Members for the Majority	Gerardo Espina Jr.	Lakas	Biliran	Lone
Members for the Majority	Jumel Anthony Espino	PDP–Laban	Pangasinan	2nd
Members for the Majority	Jonathan Keith Flores	PDP–Laban	Bukidnon	2nd
Members for the Majority	Wilton Kho	PDP–Laban	Masbate	3rd
Members for the Majority	Jake Vincent Villa	NPC	Siquijor	Lone
Members for the Majority	Elizalde Co	AKO BICOL	Party-list	
Members for the Majority	Macnell Lusotan	MARINO	Party-list	
Members for the Majority	Allan Ty	LPGMA	Party-list	
Members for the Majority	Sabiniano Canama	COOP-NATCCO	Party-list	
Members for the Minority	Stella Luz Quimbo	Liberal	Marikina	2nd
Members for the Minority	Ferdinand Gaite	Bayan Muna	Party-list	
Members for the Minority	Sarah Jane Elago	Kabataan	Party-list	
Members for the Minority	Lawrence Lemuel Fortun	Nacionalista	Agusan del Norte	1st

==== Member for the Majority ====
- Nestor Fongwan (Note: Died on December 18, 2019.) (Benguet–Lone, PDP–Laban)

== See also ==
- House of Representatives of the Philippines
- List of Philippine House of Representatives committees
- Securities and Exchange Commission
- Philippine Stock Exchange
