= Gustavo Tambunting =

Filipino politician

Gustavo S. Tambunting
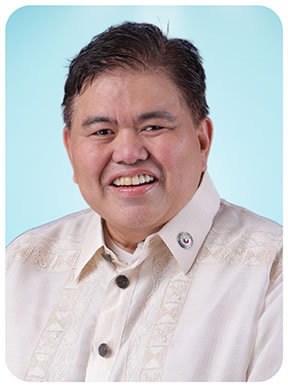
- Official portrait, 2022

Member of the Philippine House of Representatives from Parañaque's 2nd District
- In office June 30, 2022 – June 30, 2025
- Preceded by: Joy Tambunting
- Succeeded by: Brian Yamsuan
- In office June 30, 2013 – June 30, 2019
- Preceded by: Roilo Golez
- Succeeded by: Joy Tambunting

7th Vice Mayor of Parañaque
- In office June 30, 2007 – June 30, 2013
- Mayor: Florencio Bernabe Jr.
- Preceded by: Anjo Yllana
- Succeeded by: Rico Golez

Member of the Parañaque City Council
- In office June 30, 2001 – June 30, 2007
- In office February 2, 1988 – June 30, 1995

Personal details
- Born: Gustavo Alonzo Suarez Tambunting; April 24, 1964 (age 62) Sampaloc, Manila, Philippines
- Party: NUP (2021–present)
- Other political affiliations: PDP–Laban (1988–2007; 2016–2021); UNA (2012–2016); Lakas (2009-2012); Aksyon (2007– 2009)
- Spouse: Joy Myra Salvador
- Children: 3
- Education: Colegio de San Juan de Letran (BS)
- Profession: Businessman
- Website: gustambunting.com

Gustavo Alonzo Suarez Tambunting (born April 24, 1964) is a Filipino politician and businessman who served as the representative for 2nd District of Parañaque from 2022 to 2025. He also previously served in the same position from 2013 to 2019. He was also a councilor of the same city from 1988 to 1995 and again from 2001 to 2007. He was Vice Mayor of Parañaque from 2007 to 2013.

== Early life and education ==
Gus Tambunting was born on April 24, 1964. He is the eldest child of Jesús Tambunting and Teresita Suárez de Tambunting, who is from Zamboanga City. He is also the eldest grandchild of Mila del Sol, the queen of Philippine cinema during the 1930s and 1940s. He is also the nephew of television host Jeanne Young and a cousin of actor Onemig Bondoc and guitarist Ira Cruz.

Gus studied in Colegio de San Juan de Letran, graduating from elementary in 1976, high school in 1980, and college in 1984, completing a bachelor's degree in Marketing Management. With showbiz being part of the family's life, Gus' first job after college was as Associate Producer and Sales Manager of the popular television show Spin-A-Win.

== Political career ==
=== Councilor (1988–1995, 2001–2007) ===
In the 1988 local elections, the first local elections after People Power Revolution, Tambunting, at the young age of 23, ran for a seat in the then Municipal Council of Parañaque. In one of the campaign rallies before the elections, he was shot along with then Mayoral candidate Wally Ferrer and some others. Four bullets entered his body. He survived the incident and he considered as his second life, which he would dedicate to the service of Parañaque. he then won that election. Subsequently, he served four terms as Councilor – 1988 to 1992, 1992 to 1995, 2001 to 2004, and 2004 to 2007. In the 1992 and 2004 elections, he topped the elections for Councilor with a record number of votes.

At the time he was first elected, Tambunting was the youngest councilor in the Philippines. The initial years of Gus’ political career were focused on youth empowerment and development, which he pursued through collaboration with the Sangguniang Kabataan. He is the only person to serve as a councilor under the four post-martial law Parañaque administrations – Ferrer, Pablo Olivarez, Marquez, and Bernabe. He participated actively in the discussions and debates of the Sangguniang Panlungsod. He was awarded Most Outstanding Councilor for three consecutive years before taking a break from politics in 1995. He returned to government service as a Councilor in 2001 until 2007.

=== Vice Mayor (2007–2013) ===
In the 2007 local elections, Tambunting ran for Vice Mayor against a much more popular candidate. Tambunting won by a landslide victory, besting the incumbent in 15 out of 16 barangays and a winning margin of close to 20,000 votes. As Vice Mayor, he focused on programs which would support the family, as he believes a strong family leads to a strong society.

In the 2010 elections, Tambunting was re-elected as Vice Mayor for a second term. In the same year, his fellow Vice Mayors elected him as a Vice President of the Vice Mayors’ League of the Philippines. In his six years as Vice Mayor, he maintained a 100% attendance record as Presiding Officer of the City Council. He is the first Vice Mayor of Parañaque to have a 100% attendance record.

=== Member of the House of Representatives (2013–2025) ===
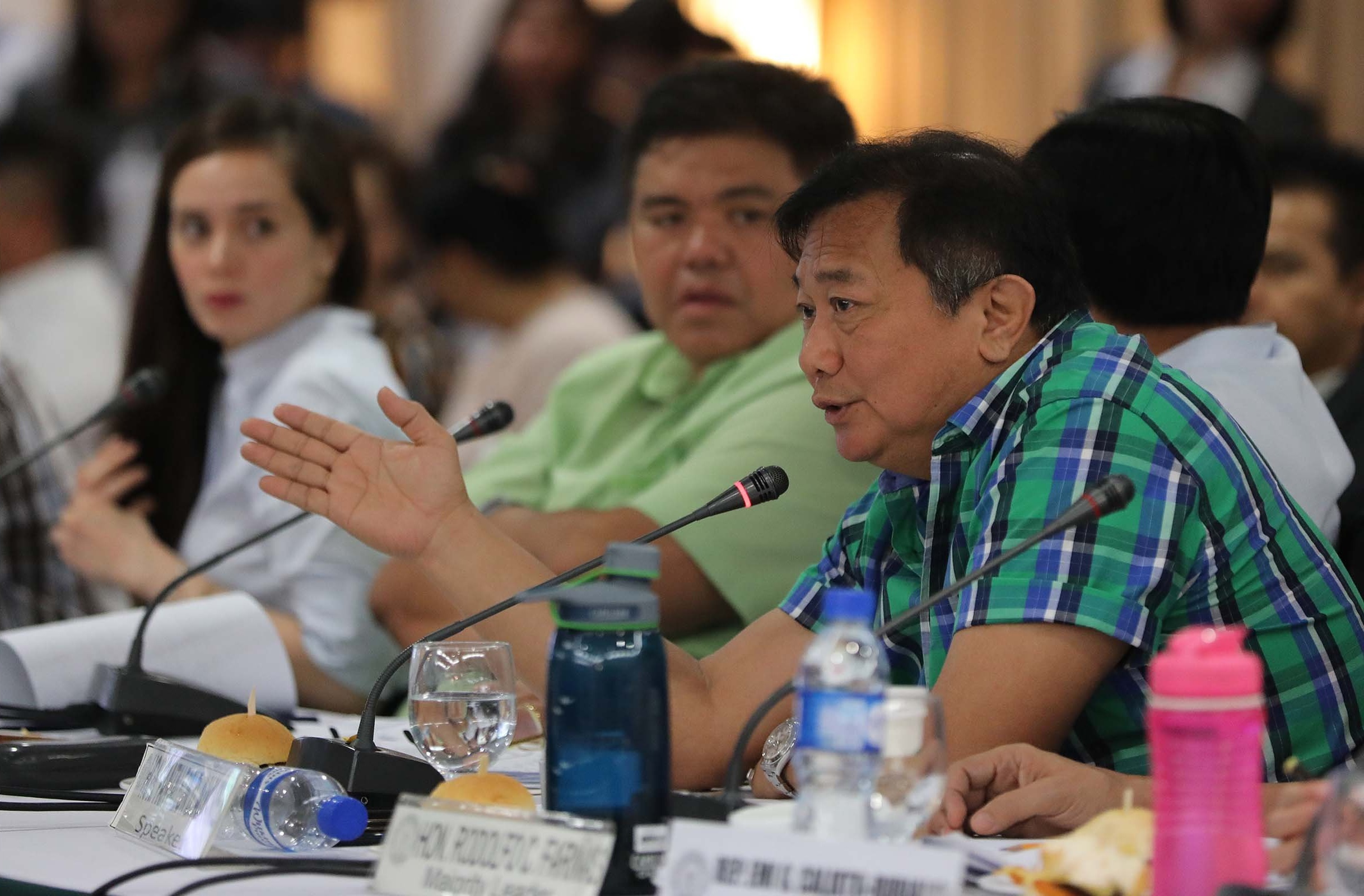
Tambunting (center) during the congressional hearing on the Resorts World Manila attack in 2017

In the 2013 local elections, Tambunting was elected Congressman of Parañaque's 2nd congressional district. He worked with the administration of Mayor Edwin Olivarez, having the distinction of being the only person to work as an elected official with all Parañaque administrations after Martial Law.

In Congress, Tambunting was a Vice-Chairperson of the Committee of Trade and Industry and a Member of the Committees of Appropriations, Banks and Financial Intermediaries, Civil Service and Professional Regulation, Ethics and Privileges, Human Rights, Labor and Employment, Legislative Franchises, Metro Manila Development, National Defense and Security, Natural Resources, and Ways and Means.

Tambunting is one of the most active members of the House of Representatives, maintaining his 100% attendance record. As of December 2015, he has authored 77 bills and resolutions and has co-authored 265 other measures. Gus is one of the main proponents of the Freedom of Information Bill in the House. As a member of the Committee of Appropriations, he actively took part in the deliberations of the annual General Appropriations Act. Gus also has shown his support for the Bank Liberalization Law, the Salary Standardization Bill, the Magna Carta for the Poor, the Income Tax Reform Bill, among many others. Gus has used his place in Congress to express opinions on various issues, such as the chronic traffic situation, the proposed Bangsamoro Basic Law, the spread of HIV-AIDS in the Philippines, among others.

In the 2016 elections, Tambunting was re-elected Congressman of the 2nd District of Parañaque under the United Nationalist Alliance. After the 2016 elections, he returned to PDP–Laban.

In the 17th Congress, Tambunting served as the Chairperson of the House Committee on Games and Amusements. It was during his tenure as Chairperson of the House Committee on Games and Amusements that the Philippine gaming industry experienced substantial growth and contributed to the development of the Philippine economy. He also served as a Vice-Chairperson of the House Committee on Banks and Financial Intermediaries and the House Committee on Ways and Means, and a member of the House Committees on Accounts, Constitutional Amendments, Dangerous Drugs, Labor and Employment, Metro Manila Development, National Defense and Security, Public Information, Public Order and Safety, and Trade and Industry. Known as one who collaborates effectively with his colleagues in working for meaningful legislation, Gus was the author or co-author of 1,167 proposed measures during the 17th Congress. He continued to fight for his advocacies, such as the Freedom of Information bill, rights for homeless and underprivileged citizens, benefits for senior citizens and SSS pensioners, among others.

Tambunting chose not to seek reelection in 2019 and was succeeded by his wife Joy. In 2022, after Joy chose not to run again, she supported his bid for a comeback, which he won, this time as a member of the National Unity Party. During the 19th Congress, Tambunting serves as the chairperson of the House Committee on Legislative Franchises, wherein he oversaw the investigation into Sonshine Media Network International's (SMNI) compliance with broadcasting laws amidst allegations of misconduct. SMNI's franchise was later revoked by a majority vote by the House in March 2024. He is also the vice chairperson of the House Committee on Labor and Employment and of House Committee on Transportation and a member of the House Committees on Accounts, Banks and Financial Intermediaries, Games and Amusements, Government Reorganization, Metro Manila Development, Nuclear Energy, Senior Citizens, and Ways and Means.

Tambunting ran for reelection in 2025 but lost to Bicol Saro Representative Brian Yamsuan.

== Business career and civic involvement ==
In 1995, Tambunting took a break from politics. During his life as a private citizen, he excelled as a businessman and continued serving his community where he concentrated on the family-run business, Superior Maintenance Services, which was expanding to Visayas and Mindanao. In 1999, the Parañaque Chamber of Commerce and Industry gave him the Salambao Award for being the city's Most Outstanding Businessman. At the age of 35, Gus was elected as the youngest president of the Rotary Club of Palanyag. During his term, he implemented the Rolling Snack Bar project for the handicapped. He also spearheaded medical missions, the distribution of rice and groceries to the needy during the Christmas season, and the distribution of bicycles with sidecars in key mission areas around the city.

== Personal life ==
Tambunting is married to Joy Myra Salvador Tambunting of Barangay San Martin de Porres, Parañaque and they have three children.

Political offices
Preceded by Anjo Yllana	Vice Mayor of Parañaque; 2007–2013	Succeeded by Rico Golez
House of Representatives of the Philippines
Preceded by Roilo Golez	Representative, Parañaque's 2nd District; 2013–2019	Succeeded by Joy Tambunting
Preceded by Joy Tambunting	Representative, Parañaque's 2nd District; 2022–2025	Succeeded by Brian Yamsuan
