= Ri Myung-hun =

North Korean basketball player

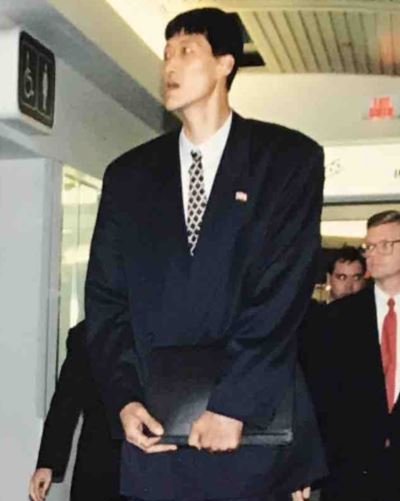
- Ri at Ottawa Macdonald–Cartier International Airport in May 1997

Personal information
- Born: 14 September 1967 (age 58) North Korea
- Listed height: 235 cm (7 ft 9 in)
- Listed weight: 128 kg (282 lb)
- Position: Center

- Korean name
- Hangul: 리명훈
- Hanja: 李明勲
- RR: Ri Myeonghun
- MR: Ri Myŏnghun

Ri Myung-hun (Korean: 리명훈; born 14 September 1967), also known as Michael Ri after his favorite basketball player Michael Jordan, is a North Korean former basketball player. At a height of 235 cm (7 ft 8 1/2 in) and a weight of 128 kg (282 lb), he is believed to be the tallest person in North Korea.

== Basketball career ==
Ri played center for the North Korea national basketball team, appearing at two Asian Games in 1990 and 2002. Once proclaimed to be the tallest living human being in the world, he stands 236 cm (7 ft 9 in) tall and once planned to play in the National Basketball Association (NBA) in the 1990s. According to the Associated Press, he was "the world's tallest basketball player."

In anticipation of joining the NBA, Ri worked out in Canada, where he was scouted by numerous teams. But he was unable to play in the league because of a U.S. ban on trade set forth in a piece of legislation called the Trading with the Enemy Act of 1917. The U.S. Department of State permitted Ri to compete in the country in 2000, on the main condition that none of Ri's salary could be repatriated to North Korea. North Korean officials responded by refusing to let Ri leave. Kim Jong-il told NBA scout Tony Ronzone he would allow Ri to leave North Korea and play professional basketball if the team paid Kim's government in wheat. Ri was permitted to conduct an interview with CNN's Mike Chinoy in which he was quoted as saying, "I'm a big man. I want to test my ability. I am not interested in money or politics. As a sportsman, I just want to try." Eventually, Ri said he was content to remain playing basketball in the "bosom" of North Korean supreme leader Kim Jong-il. In a game between mixed teams of players from North Korea and South Korea, Ri scored 26 points in 21 minutes, though his "dankyol" (solidarity) side lost 141–138.

== Personal life ==
On 28 December 2011, North Korean television showed footage from the funeral of Kim Jong Il in which an unusually tall person was seen in the crowd. The person was speculated to have been Ri Myung-hun.
